= 2008 Caribbean Cup squads =

== Group I ==
=== Antigua and Barbuda ===
Head coach: (Antigua and Barbuda) Rowan Benjamin

No.	Pos.	Player	Date of birth (age)	Caps	Goals	Club
	GK	Molvin James	23 May 1981 (aged 27)	3	0	(Antigua and Barbuda Football Association) Villa Lions
	GK	Keita de Castro	23 May 1981 (aged 27)	4	0	(Antigua and Barbuda Football Association) All Saints United
	DF	George Dublin	11 February 1977 (aged 31)	26	2	(Antigua and Barbuda Football Association) Hoppers
	DF	Kyle Matthews	1 March 1988 (aged 20)	0	0	(Antigua and Barbuda Football Association) Empire
	DF	Roy Gregory	6 March 1990 (aged 18)	6	1	(Antigua and Barbuda Football Association) Freemansville FC
	DF	Garfield Gonsalves	2 September 1972 (aged 36)	23	5	(Antigua and Barbuda Football Association) Villa Lions
	DF	Ranjae Christian	18 December 1977 (aged 30)	22	4	(Antigua and Barbuda Football Association) Bassa
	DF	Kevin Roberts		2	0	(Antigua and Barbuda Football Association) Parham
	DF	Brian Samuel	3 July 1983 (aged 25)	5	0	(Antigua and Barbuda Football Association) SAP
	DF	Akeem Thomas	5 January 1990 (aged 18)	1	0	(Antigua and Barbuda Football Association) Bassa
	MF	Winston Roberts	28 January 1976 (aged 32)	7	2	(Antigua and Barbuda Football Association) Parham
	MF	Teran Williams	20 November 1984 (aged 24)	15	2	(Antigua and Barbuda Football Association) SAP
	MF	Jamie Thomas	21 October 1985 (aged 23)	12	7	(Antigua and Barbuda Football Association) Bassa
	MF	Quentin Clarke	8 April 1969 (aged 39)	15	3	(Antigua and Barbuda Football Association) Bassa
	MF	Ken Pennyfeather	6 June 1986 (aged 22)	9	0	(Antigua and Barbuda Football Association) Hoppers
	MF	Randolph Burton	14 January 1987 (aged 21)	11	5	(Antigua and Barbuda Football Association) Bassa
	MF	Tash Harris	28 October 1983 (aged 25)	0	0	(Antigua and Barbuda Football Association) Old Road
	FW	Gayson Gregory	5 April 1982 (aged 26)	25	4	(Antigua and Barbuda Football Association) Freemansville FC
	FW	Peter Byers	20 October 1984 (aged 24)	22	17	(Canadian Soccer Association) Montreal Impact
	FW	Kerry Skepple	25 November 1980 (aged 28)	14	6	(Football Association of Finland) Atlantis

=== Cuba ===
Head coach: (Cuba) Raul Gonzalez Triana

No.	Pos.	Player	Date of birth (age)	Caps	Goals	Club
	GK	Odelín Molina	3 August 1974 (aged 34)	88	0	(Football Association of Cuba) Villa Clara
	GK	Dany Luis Quintero	10 December 1984 (aged 23)	4	0	(Football Association of Cuba) Cienfuegos
	DF	Silvio Minoso	23 December 1976 (aged 31)	52	0	(Football Association of Cuba) Villa Clara
	DF	Yénier Márquez	3 January 1979 (aged 29)	76	8	(Football Association of Cuba) Villa Clara
	DF	Kánier Dranguet	2 September 1982 (aged 26)	7	1	(Football Association of Cuba) Guantánamo
	DF	Reysander Fernández	22 August 1984 (aged 24)	37	1	(Football Association of Cuba) Ciego de Ávila
	DF	Aliannis Urgellés	25 June 1986 (aged 22)	9	1	(Football Association of Cuba) Guantánamo
	DF	Jorge Luis Clavelo	8 August 1982 (aged 26)	20	2	(Football Association of Cuba) Villa Clara
	DF	Yoel Colomé	15 October 1982 (aged 26)	7	0	(Football Association of Cuba) Ciudad de La Habana
	MF	Jaime Colomé	30 June 1979 (aged 29)	42	9	(Football Association of Cuba) Ciudad de La Habana
	MF	Jensy Muñoz	26 January 1983 (aged 25)	19	2	(Football Association of Cuba) Ciudad de La Habana
	MF	Lázaro Alfonso	4 February 1981 (aged 27)	11	0	(Football Association of Cuba) Ciudad de La Habana
	FW	Alain Cervantes	17 November 1983 (aged 25)	40	4	(Football Association of Cuba) Ciego de Ávila
	FW	Leonel Duarte	1 August 1987 (aged 21)	25	6	(Football Association of Cuba) Ciego de Ávila
	FW	Roberto Linares	10 February 1986 (aged 22)	12	9	(Football Association of Cuba) Villa Clara
	FW	Ariel Martínez	9 May 1986 (aged 22)	13	3	(Football Association of Cuba) Sancti Spíritus
	FW	Luis Villegas	2 June 1988 (aged 20)	8	0	(Football Association of Cuba) Villa Clara
	FW	Mario Ruiz	7 March 1986 (aged 22)	5	0	(Football Association of Cuba) Ciudad de La Habana

=== Guadeloupe ===
Head coach: (Guadeloupe) Roger Salnot

No.	Pos.	Player	Date of birth (age)	Caps	Goals	Club
	GK	Franck Grandel	17 March 1978 (aged 30)	3	0	(Royal Dutch Football Association) Utrecht
	DF	Alain Vertot	14 November 1972 (aged 36)	8	0	(Ligue guadeloupéenne de football) L'Étoile de Morne-à-l'Eau
	DF	Cédric Vanoukia	20 April 1982 (aged 26)	1	0	(French Football Federation) Quevilly-Rouen
	DF	Cédric Avinel	11 September 1986 (aged 22)	0	0	(The Football Association) Watford
	DF	Willy Lawrence	3 April 1984 (aged 24)	5	0	(Ligue guadeloupéenne de football) L'Étoile de Morne-à-l'Eau
	DF	Jean-Luc Lambourde	10 April 1980 (aged 28)	10	2	(Ligue guadeloupéenne de football) Amical Club
	DF	Méddy Lina	11 January 1986 (aged 22)	6	0	(Ligue guadeloupéenne de football) Evolucas
	MF	Lérry Hanany	1 October 1982 (aged 26)	7	5	(Ligue guadeloupéenne de football) La Gauloise
	MF	David Fleurival	19 February 1984 (aged 24)	4	0	(Royal Belgian Football Association) Mons
	MF	Stéphane Auvray	4 September 1981 (aged 27)	1	0	(French Football Federation) Vannes
	MF	Wilfrid Loizeau	20 March 1985 (aged 23)	0	0	(Football Association of the Czech Republic) Chmel Blšany
	MF	Grégory Gendrey	10 July 1986 (aged 22)	5	2	(Ligue guadeloupéenne de football) Evolucas
	MF	Xavier Bématol	31 July 1982 (aged 26)	4	0	(Ligue guadeloupéenne de football) Solidarité-Scolaire
	FW	Ludovic Quistin	24 May 1984 (aged 24)	3	0	(The Football Association) Weston-super-Mare
	FW	Mickaël Antoine-Curier	5 March 1983 (aged 25)	3	4	(Scottish Football Association) Dundee
	FW	Michaël Niçoise	19 September 1984 (aged 24)	0	0	(Swiss Football Association) Neuchâtel Xamax
	FW	Livio Nabab	14 June 1988 (aged 20)	0	0	(French Football Federation) Caen
	FW	Vidian Valérius	24 June 1988 (aged 20)	1	0	(French Football Federation) Sénart-Moissy

=== Haiti ===
Head coach: (Colombia) Jairo Ríos

No.	Pos.	Player	Date of birth (age)	Caps	Goals	Club
	GK	Yves-Marie Clervin	2 November 1985 (aged 23)	3	0	(Haitian Football Federation) Capoise
	GK	Wings Pierre-Louis	25 June 1985 (aged 23)	0	0	(Haitian Football Federation) Mirebalais
	DF	Markorel Sampeur	20 March 1986 (aged 22)	9	0	(Haitian Football Federation) Violette
	DF	Frantz Gilles	1 November 1977 (aged 31)	62	2	(Haitian Football Federation) Cavaly
	DF	Pierre Richard Bruny	6 April 1972 (aged 36)	72	1	(Haitian Football Federation) Don Bosco
	DF	Ednerson Raymond	14 May 1985 (aged 23)	17	0	(Haitian Football Federation) Baltimore
	DF	Mechack Jérôme	21 April 1990 (aged 18)	7	0	(Haitian Football Federation) Baltimore
	DF	Grégory Ismaël	9 May 1991 (aged 17)	1	0	(Haitian Football Federation) Aigle Noir
	MF	Peter Germain	22 January 1982 (aged 26)	43	3	(Haitian Football Federation) Baltimore
	MF	Alexandre Boucicaut	18 November 1981 (aged 27)	39	9	(Haitian Football Federation) Violette
	MF	James Marcelin	13 June 1986 (aged 22)	10	0	(Puerto Rican Football Federation) Puerto Rico Islanders
	MF	Wadson Coriolan	25 May 1984 (aged 24)	10	1	(Haitian Football Federation) Violette
	MF	Alain Vubert	25 November 1985 (aged 23)	24	1	(Haitian Football Federation) Baltimore
	MF	Guiliano Philippe	5 September 1984 (aged 24)	1	0	(Haitian Football Federation) Racing Gonaïves
	FW	Ricardo Pierre-Louis	2 November 1984 (aged 24)	9	1	(United States Soccer Federation) Columbus Crew
	FW	Sony Norde	27 July 1989 (aged 19)	5	0	(Argentine Football Association) Boca Juniors
	FW	Leonel Saint-Preux	12 February 1985 (aged 23)	17	2	(Haitian Football Federation) Zénit
	FW	Éliphène Cadet	10 October 1980 (aged 28)	33	12	(Haitian Football Federation) Tempête

== Group J ==
=== Barbados ===
Head coach: (Barbados) Thomas Jordan

No.	Pos.	Player	Date of birth (age)	Caps	Goals	Club
	GK	Alvin Rouse	13 August 1982 (aged 26)	15	0	(Irish Football Association) Dungannon Swifts
	GK	Adrian Chase	6 November 1973 (aged 35)	22	0	(Barbados Football Association) Youth Milan
	DF	Jonathan Straker	16 October 1979 (aged 29)	27	1	(Barbados Football Association) BDFSP
	DF	Bryan Neblett	12 October 1978 (aged 30)	20	1	(Barbados Football Association) Notre Dame
	DF	Omar Archer	20 August 1980 (aged 28)	4	0	(Barbados Football Association) Brittons Hill
	DF	Barry Skeete	18 January 1984 (aged 24)	9	1	(Argentine Football Association) Sportivo Barracas
	DF	Rohan Hall	1 February 1984 (aged 24)	6	0	(Barbados Football Association) BDFSP
	DF	Andre Daniel	4 February 1983 (aged 25)	4	0	(Barbados Football Association) Pride of Gall Hill
	MF	Norman Forde	16 April 1977 (aged 31)	57	16	(Barbados Football Association) Notre Dame
	MF	John Parris	26 April 1974 (aged 34)	51	4	(Barbados Football Association) Notre Dame
	MF	Rommell Burgess	14 March 1982 (aged 26)	19	0	(Barbados Football Association) Eden Stars
	MF	Gregory Goodridge	10 July 1971 (aged 37)	56	15	(Barbados Football Association) Brittons Hill
	MF	Jeffrey Williams	10 April 1982 (aged 26)	18	5	(Barbados Football Association) Notre Dame
	MF	Donovan Lavine	4 April 1981 (aged 27)	5	0	(Barbados Football Association) Technico
	FW	Riviere Williams	28 April 1982 (aged 26)	13	1	(Barbados Football Association) BDFSP
	FW	Dwayne McLean	4 June 1987 (aged 21)	3	0	(Barbados Football Association) BDFSP
	FW	Mario Harte	30 August 1988 (aged 20)	7	0	(Barbados Football Association) BDFSP
	FW	Angus Doyle	9 December 1982 (aged 25)	7	1	(Barbados Football Association) Youth Milan

=== Grenada ===
Head coach: (Grenada) Anthony Modeste

No.	Pos.	Player	Date of birth (age)	Caps	Goals	Club
	GK	Desmond Noel	28 November 1974 (aged 34)	14	0	(Grenada Football Association) Queens Park Rangers
	DF	Marc Marshall	24 December 1985 (aged 22)	17	0	(Grenada Football Association) GBBS Demerara Mutual
	DF	Anthony Modeste	30 August 1975 (aged 33)	42	13	(Jamaica Football Federation) Portmore United
	DF	Cassim Langaigne	27 February 1980 (aged 28)	24	4	(Grenada Football Association) Hurricanes
	DF	Shanon Phillip	9 November 1988 (aged 20)	2	0	(Grenada Football Association) Hurricanes
	DF	Michael Mark	21 April 1986 (aged 22)	0	0	(Grenada Football Association) Eagles Super Strikers
	DF	Marvin Frederick	16 July 1975 (aged 33)	13	0	(Grenada Football Association) Ball Dogs
	MF	Ricky Charles	19 June 1975 (aged 33)	47	29	(Trinidad and Tobago Football Association) St. Ann's Rangers
	MF	Shane Rennie	14 December 1986 (aged 21)	20	8	(Trinidad and Tobago Football Association) St. Ann's Rangers
	MF	Junior Williams	3 November 1987 (aged 21)	5	0	(Grenada Football Association) Queens Park Rangers
	MF	Finbar Williams	24 November 1976 (aged 32)	4	2	(Grenada Football Association) South Stars
	MF	Dwayne Leo	28 June 1982 (aged 26)	9	0	(Grenada Football Association)
	MF	Kwan Baptiste	26 May 1985 (aged 23)	9	0	(Grenada Football Association) Chantimelle
	FW	Kithson Bain	26 May 1982 (aged 26)	16	2	(Grenada Football Association) Ball Dogs
	FW	Marcus Julien	30 December 1986 (aged 21)	4	0	(Grenada Football Association) Eagles Super Strikers
	FW	Marcus Douglas	10 January 1980 (aged 28)	0	0	(Grenada Football Association)

=== Jamaica ===
Head coach: (England) John Barnes

No.	Pos.	Player	Date of birth (age)	Caps	Goals	Club
	GK	Donovan Ricketts	7 June 1977 (aged 31)	75	0	(Jamaica Football Federation) Village United
	GK	Dwayne Miller	14 July 1987 (aged 21)	2	0	(Jamaica Football Federation) Harbour View
	DF	Tyrone Marshall	12 November 1974 (aged 34)	69	5	(Canadian Soccer Association) Toronto FC
	DF	O'Neil Thompson	11 August 1983 (aged 25)	12	0	(Norwegian Football Federation) Notodden
	DF	Demar Stewart	15 December 1984 (aged 23)	6	0	(Chinese Football Association) Chengdu Blades
	DF	Jason Morrison	7 June 1984 (aged 24)	6	0	(Hungarian Football Federation) Ferencváros
	DF	Rafe Wolfe	19 December 1985 (aged 22)	0	0	(Hungarian Football Federation) Ferencváros
	DF	Shavar Thomas	29 January 1981 (aged 27)	23	0	(United States Soccer Federation) Chivas USA
	DF	O'Brian Woodbine	1 November 1988 (aged 20)	6	0	(Jamaica Football Federation) Reno
	MF	Rodolph Austin	1 June 1985 (aged 23)	19	1	(Norwegian Football Federation) Brann
	MF	Eric Vernan	4 July 1987 (aged 21)	2	0	(Jamaica Football Federation) Portmore United
	MF	Demar Phillips	23 September 1983 (aged 25)	26	4	(The Football Association) Stoke City
	MF	Keneil Moodie	29 July 1986 (aged 22)	9	0	(Jamaica Football Federation) Seba United
	FW	Luton Shelton	11 November 1985 (aged 23)	32	17	(Danish Football Association) Aalborg
	FW	Sean Fraser	15 February 1983 (aged 25)	5	0	(United States Soccer Federation) Miami FC
	FW	Omar Cummings	13 July 1982 (aged 26)	6	2	(United States Soccer Federation) Colorado Rapids
	FW	Dane Richards	14 December 1983 (aged 24)	6	0	(United States Soccer Federation) New York Red Bulls
	FW	Andy Williams	23 September 1977 (aged 31)	96	19	(United States Soccer Federation) Real Salt Lake
	FW	Roland Dean	25 April 1982 (aged 26)	15	8	(Jamaica Football Federation) Tivoli Gardens

=== Trinidad and Tobago ===
Head coach: (Colombia) Francisco Maturana

No.	Pos.	Player	Date of birth (age)	Caps	Goals	Club
	GK	Marvin Phillip	1 August 1984 (aged 24)	19	0	(Trinidad and Tobago Football Association) W Connection
	GK	Jan-Michael Williams	26 October 1984 (aged 24)	20	0	(Hungarian Football Federation) Ferencváros
	DF	Keyeno Thomas	29 December 1977 (aged 30)	62	2	(Trinidad and Tobago Football Association) Joe Public
	DF	Seon Power	2 February 1984 (aged 24)	15	1	(Trinidad and Tobago Football Association) Joe Public
	DF	Makan Hislop	3 September 1985 (aged 23)	24	0	(Trinidad and Tobago Football Association) United Petrotrin
	DF	Aklie Edwards	17 May 1985 (aged 23)	16	1	(Trinidad and Tobago Football Association) Defence Force
	DF	Avery John	18 June 1975 (aged 33)	66	0	(United States Soccer Federation) Miami FC
	DF	Cyd Gray	21 November 1976 (aged 32)	56	1	(All India Football Federation) Pune
	DF	Julius James	9 July 1984 (aged 24)	2	0	(Canadian Soccer Association) Toronto FC
	MF	Aurtis Whitley	1 May 1977 (aged 31)	37	2	(Trinidad and Tobago Football Association) W Connection
	MF	Clyde Leon	8 December 1983 (aged 24)	16	1	(Trinidad and Tobago Football Association) W Connection
	MF	Keon Daniel	16 January 1987 (aged 21)	25	8	(Trinidad and Tobago Football Association) United Petrotrin
	MF	Khaleem Hyland	5 June 1989 (aged 19)	22	2	(Trinidad and Tobago Football Association) San Juan Jabloteh
	MF	Arnold Dwarika	23 February 1973 (aged 35)	71	27	(Trinidad and Tobago Football Association) Joe Public
	MF	Osei Telesford	26 September 1983 (aged 25)	16	1	(Puerto Rican Football Federation) Puerto Rico Islanders
	FW	Cornell Glen	21 October 1980 (aged 28)	50	20	(Trinidad and Tobago Football Association) San Juan Jabloteh
	FW	Anthony Wolfe	23 December 1983 (aged 24)	18	3	(Trinidad and Tobago Football Association) North East Stars
	FW	Andre Toussaint	26 August 1981 (aged 27)	24	5	(Trinidad and Tobago Football Association) W Connection
	FW	Errol McFarlane	12 October 1977 (aged 31)	11	4	(Lebanese Football Association) Al Mabarra
