= Antigua and Barbuda national football team results =

Below is a list of results for the Antigua and Barbuda national football team.

== Results ==
Date	Location	Opponent	Score	Match Type	Antigua and Barbuda Scorers
19 February 2000	Dominica	Dominica	0–2	Friendly	
29 February 2000	Barbados	Barbados	2–2	Friendly	?' ?'
16 April 2000	Antigua and Barbuda	Bermuda	0–0	World Cup Qualifier	
23 April 2000	Bermuda	Bermuda	1–1	World Cup Qualifier	Edwards 73'
29 April 2000	British Virgin Islands	Dominica	3–2	Friendly	?' ?' ?'
30 April 2000	British Virgin Islands	British Virgin Islands	1–1	Friendly	?'
7 May 2000	Antigua and Barbuda	Saint Vincent and the Grenadines	2–1	World Cup Qualifier	G. Gregory 20', 64'
21 May 2000	St. Vincent and the Grenadines	Saint Vincent and the Grenadines	0–4	World Cup Qualifier	
11 June 2000	Antigua and Barbuda	Guatemala	0–1	World Cup Qualifier	
18 June 2000	Guatemala	Guatemala	1–8	World Cup Qualifier	Bleau 60'
28 January 2001	Antigua and Barbuda	British Virgin Islands	1–1	Friendly	?'
25 February 2001	Antigua and Barbuda	Saint Lucia	0–1	Friendly	
3 March 2001	Antigua and Barbuda	Dominican Republic	2–3	Caribbean Cup	Frederick 3', 76'
4 March 2001	Antigua and Barbuda	Saint Kitts and Nevis	2–2	Caribbean Cup	Anthony 47' (pen.), 52'
13 January 2002	Antigua and Barbuda	Dominica	4–0	Friendly	Jeffers; Whyte; Anthony; Frederick
26 January 2002	Antigua and Barbuda	Saint Kitts and Nevis	1–2	Friendly	Watts 90'
27 October 2002	Antigua and Barbuda	Saint Kitts and Nevis	1–1	Friendly	?'
8 November 2002	St. Lucia	Saint Lucia	1–2	Friendly	?'
18 November 2002	Haiti	Haiti	0–1	Gold Cup Qualifier	
20 November 2002	Haiti	Netherlands Antilles	1–1	Gold Cup Qualifier	Jeffers 77'
26 March 2003	Trinidad and Tobago	Trinidad and Tobago	0–2	Gold Cup Qualifier	
28 March 2003	Trinidad and Tobago	Cuba	0–2	Gold Cup Qualifier	
30 March 2003	Trinidad and Tobago	Guadeloupe	0–2	Gold Cup Qualifier	
1 February 2004	Antigua and Barbuda	Saint Kitts and Nevis	1–0	Friendly	?'
18 February 2004	Antigua and Barbuda	Netherlands Antilles	2–0	World Cup Qualifier	Roberts 39'; Clarke 89'
21 March 2004	St. Kitts and Nevis	Saint Kitts and Nevis	3–2	Friendly	Frederick ?' ?'; Skepple ?'
31 March 2004	Netherlands Antilles	Netherlands Antilles	0–3	World Cup Qualifier	
2 November 2004	St. Kitts and Nevis	Montserrat	5–4	Caribbean Cup	Hawson 30' (o.g.); Frederick 53'; Gonsalves 67', 82'; T. Thomas 72'
4 November 2004	St. Kitts and Nevis	Saint Kitts and Nevis	0–2	Caribbean Cup	
6 November 2004	St. Kitts and Nevis	Saint Lucia	1–2	Caribbean Cup	Dublin 65'
12 January 2005	Antigua and Barbuda	Trinidad and Tobago	2–1	Friendly	Byers 48'; Isaac 57'
6 February 2005	Barbados	Barbados	2–3	Friendly	T. Thomas 2'; Byers 74'
18 December 2005	United States	Hungary	0–3	Friendly	
24 February 2006	Guyana	Guyana	1–2	Friendly	Skepple 77'
26 February 2006	Guyana	Guyana	1–4	Friendly	Julian 70'
27 August 2006	Antigua and Barbuda	Saint Vincent and the Grenadines	1–0	Friendly	T. Thomas 18'
3 September 2006	Antigua and Barbuda	Dominica	1–0	Friendly	Byers 50'
20 September 2006	Antigua and Barbuda	Anguilla	5–3	Caribbean Cup	Byers 8' (pen.), 16', 71' (pen.); T. Thomas 29'; J. Thomas 90'
22 September 2006	Antigua and Barbuda	Barbados	1–3	Caribbean Cup	Byers 16'
24 September 2006	Antigua and Barbuda	Saint Kitts and Nevis	1–0	Caribbean Cup	G. Gregory 77'
3 November 2006	St. Vincent and the Grenadines	Grenada	1–1	Friendly	Simon ?'
5 November 2006	St. Vincent and the Grenadines	Saint Vincent and the Grenadines	2–2	Friendly	Byers 8', 21' (pen.)
24 November 2006	Guyana	Guyana	0–6	Caribbean Cup	
26 November 2006	Guyana	Dominican Republic	0–2	Caribbean Cup	
28 November 2006	Guyana	Guadeloupe	1–3	Caribbean Cup	G. Gregory 45'
18 November 2007	Antigua and Barbuda	Saint Kitts and Nevis	0–3	Friendly	
1 December 2007	Saint Kitts and Nevis	Saint Kitts and Nevis	2–0	Friendly	Byers 63', 88'
13 January 2008	Barbados	Barbados	2–3	Friendly	Byers 4', 38'
6 February 2008	Aruba	Aruba	3–0	World Cup Qualifier	Dublin 22'; G. Gregory 27'; Sierra 40' (o.g.)
26 March 2008	Antigua and Barbuda	Aruba	1–0	World Cup Qualifier	Challenger 88'
18 May 2008	Antigua and Barbuda	Saint Lucia	6–1	Friendly	Skepple 28', 30'; Burton 45', ?'; Smith ?'; Williams ?'
8 June 2008	Antigua and Barbuda	Saint Kitts and Nevis	2–0	Friendly	Skepple 3'; G. Gregory 87'
17 June 2008	Antigua and Barbuda	Cuba	3–4	World Cup Qualifier	Williams 9'; Skepple 13'; Simon 80'
22 June 2008	Cuba	Cuba	0–4	World Cup Qualifier	
27 August 2008	Cayman Islands	Bermuda	4–0	Caribbean Cup	J. Thomas 3', 23'; Burton 60'; Challenger 77'
30 August 2008	Cayman Islands	Cayman Islands	1–1	Caribbean Cup	Christian 33'
31 August 2008	Cayman Islands	Saint Martin	3–2	Caribbean Cup	J. Thomas 44', 68'; R. Gregory 89'
21 September 2008	Antigua and Barbuda	Guyana	3–0	Friendly	Burton 12'; Challenger 75'; Julian 90+1'
5 November 2008	Trinidad and Tobago	Trinidad and Tobago	2–3	Caribbean Cup	Byers 34'; Burton 90+2'
7 November 2008	Trinidad and Tobago	Guyana	2–1	Caribbean Cup	Leigertwood 12'; Williams 74'
9 November 2008	Trinidad and Tobago	Saint Kitts and Nevis	4–3	Caribbean Cup	Byers 8', 45' (pen.); J. Thomas 59', 73'
4 December 2008	Jamaica	Haiti	1–1	Caribbean Cup	Byers 72'
6 December 2008	Jamaica	Cuba	0–3	Caribbean Cup	
8 December 2008	Jamaica	Guadeloupe	2–2	Caribbean Cup	Byers 35', 82'
3 June 2009	Suriname	Guyana	2–1	Friendly	Frederick 79'; Griffith 90'
5 June 2009	Suriname	French Guiana	1–2	Friendly	?'
28 June 2009	Grenada	Grenada	2–2	Friendly	G. Gregory 33'; R. Gregory 90'
21 July 2010	Trinidad and Tobago	Trinidad and Tobago	1–4	Friendly	A. Thomas 29'
28 August 2010	St. Kitts and Nevis	Saint Kitts and Nevis	1–1	Friendly	Burton ?'
19 September 2010	Antigua and Barbuda	Trinidad and Tobago	0–1	Friendly	
23 September 2010	Antigua and Barbuda	Saint Lucia	5–0	Friendly	Burton 17', 45'; Byers 48', 76'; J. Thomas 75'
10 November 2010	Antigua and Barbuda	Suriname	2–1	Caribbean Cup	Burton 17'; Cochrane 63'
12 November 2010	Antigua and Barbuda	Dominica	0–0	Caribbean Cup	
14 November 2010	Antigua and Barbuda	Cuba	0–0	Caribbean Cup	
27 November 2010	Martinique	Jamaica	1–3	Caribbean Cup	G. Gregory 49'
29 November 2010	Martinique	Guyana	1–0	Caribbean Cup	G. Gregory 69'
1 December 2010	Martinique	Guadeloupe	0–1	Caribbean Cup	
27 May 2011	Grenada	Grenada	2–2	Friendly	Burton 51'; K. Alexander 73'
26 August 2011	Antigua and Barbuda	Saint Vincent and the Grenadines	1–0	Friendly	Skepple 11'
28 August 2011	Antigua and Barbuda	Saint Vincent and the Grenadines	2–2	Friendly	Dublin 45'; J. Thomas 89'
2 September 2011	Antigua and Barbuda	Curaçao	5–2	World Cup Qualifier	Joseph 42'; Griffith 45'; T. Thomas 54'; Byers 75, 80'
6 September 2011	US Virgin Islands	U.S. Virgin Islands	8–1	World Cup Qualifier	Christian 18'; Byers 38, 51, 57'; Cochrane 47'; Dublin 54'; Burton 68, 74'
30 September 2011	Antigua and Barbuda	Martinique	1–0	Friendly	Burton 78'
2 October 2011	Antigua and Barbuda	Martinique	1–2	Friendly	Byers 80'
7 October 2011	Curacao	Curaçao	1–0	World Cup Qualifier	T. Thomas 73'
11 October 2011	Antigua and Barbuda	U.S. Virgin Islands	10–0	World Cup Qualifier	T. Thomas 7, 41, 78'; Byers 24, 31, 40'; Burton 55, 65'; J. Thomas 86'; Murtagh 90'
5 November 2011	Antigua and Barbuda	Guadeloupe	0–0	Friendly	
11 November 2011	Antigua and Barbuda	Haiti	1–0	World Cup Qualifier	Skepple 82'
15 November 2011	Haiti	Haiti	1–2	World Cup Qualifier	T. Thomas 9'
February 29, 2012	Antigua and Barbuda	Trinidad and Tobago	0–4	Friendly	
March 3, 2012	St. Kitts and Nevis	Saint Kitts and Nevis	0–1	Friendly	
March 30, 2012	St. Vincent and the Grenadines	Saint Vincent and the Grenadines	0–1	Friendly	
April 1, 2012	St. Vincent and the Grenadines	Saint Vincent and the Grenadines	2–1	Friendly	Robinson 19'; Byers 51'
June 8, 2012	United States	United States	1–3	World Cup Qualifier	Byers 64'
June 12, 2012	Antigua and Barbuda	Jamaica	0–0	World Cup Qualifier	
September 7, 2012	Guatemala	Guatemala	1–3	World Cup Qualifier	Byers 38'
September 11, 2012	Antigua and Barbuda	Guatemala	0–1	World Cup Qualifier	
October 12, 2012	Antigua and Barbuda	United States	1–2	World Cup Qualifier	Blackstock 25'
October 16, 2012	Jamaica	Jamaica	1–4	World Cup Qualifier	Griffith 61'
December 7, 2012	Antigua and Barbuda	Dominican Republic	1–2	Caribbean Cup	Byers 17'
December 9, 2012	Antigua and Barbuda	Trinidad and Tobago	2–0	Caribbean Cup	Griffith 51'; Byers 73'
December 11, 2012	Antigua and Barbuda	Haiti	0–1	Caribbean Cup	
September 3, 2014	Antigua and Barbuda	Anguilla	6–0	Caribbean Cup Qualifier	Jahraldo-Martin 8'; Murtagh 35' 72'; Harriette 41'; Byers 55'; Griffith 69'
September 5, 2014	Antigua and Barbuda	Dominican Republic	2–1	Caribbean Cup Qualifier	Byers 55'; Jarvis 71'
September 7, 2014	Antigua and Barbuda	Saint Vincent and the Grenadines	2–1	Caribbean Cup Qualifier	A. Thomas 83'; Jarvis 90+'
October 8, 2014	Trinidad and Tobago	Saint Lucia	2–1	Caribbean Cup Qualifier	Murtagh 67'; Parker 90+4'
October 10, 2014	Trinidad and Tobago	Dominican Republic	0–0	Caribbean Cup Qualifier	
October 12, 2014	Trinidad and Tobago	Trinidad and Tobago	0–1	Caribbean Cup Qualifier	
November 12, 2014	Jamaica	Haiti	2–2	Caribbean Cup	Weston 58'; Byers 60'
November 14, 2014	Jamaica	Jamaica	0–3	Caribbean Cup	
November 16, 2014	Jamaica	Martinique	0–2	Caribbean Cup	
March 15, 2015	Antigua and Barbuda	Dominica	1–0	Friendly	A. Thomas 32'
March 22, 2015	Antigua and Barbuda	British Virgin Islands	1–0	Friendly	Hazlewood 4'
June 10, 2015	Antigua and Barbuda	Saint Lucia	1–3	World Cup Qualifier	Harriette 21'
June 14, 2015	Antigua and Barbuda	Saint Lucia	4–1	World Cup Qualifier	Parker 72', 90+3'; Harriette 85'; Tumwa 90+5'
September 4, 2015	Antigua and Barbuda	Guatemala	1–0	World Cup Qualifier	Weston 72' (pen.)
September 8, 2015	Guatemala	Guatemala	0–2	World Cup Qualifier	
March 23, 2016	Antigua and Barbuda	Aruba	2–1	Caribbean Cup Qualifier	Parker 4'; George 23'
March 29, 2016	Saint Kitts and Nevis	Saint Kitts and Nevis	0–1	Caribbean Cup Qualifier	
June 4, 2016	Puerto Rico	Puerto Rico	1–2 (a.e.t.)	Caribbean Cup Qualifier	Blackstock 35'
June 7, 2016	Antigua and Barbuda	Grenada	5–1	Caribbean Cup Qualifier	Byers 51'; Jahraldo-Martin 61', 83'; Murtagh 76'; Harriette 77'
October 5, 2016	Curaçao	Curaçao	0–3	Caribbean Cup Qualifier	
October 8, 2016	Antigua and Barbuda	Puerto Rico	2–0	Caribbean Cup Qualifier	Byers 43'; Smith 86'
November 22, 2016	Antigua and Barbuda	Estonia	0–1	Friendly	
March 21, 2018	Antigua and Barbuda	Bermuda	3–2	Friendly	Browne 14'; Parker 58'; Weston 60'
March 25, 2018	Jamaica	Jamaica	1–1	Friendly	Byers 90+5'
April 1, 2018	Antigua and Barbuda	Dominica	0–0	Friendly	
April 28, 2018	Antigua and Barbuda	Jamaica	0–2	Friendly	
September 7, 2018	Antigua and Barbuda	Saint Lucia	0–3	CONCACAF Nations League Qualifier	
October 12, 2018	Bahamas	Bahamas	6–0	CONCACAF Nations League Qualifier	Weston 12' (pen.), 43' (pen.), 77'; Byers 15'; Jahraldo-Martin 40', 68'
November 19, 2018	Martinique	Martinique	2–4	CONCACAF Nations League Qualifier	Weston 17'; Griffith 90+1'
March 23, 2019	Antigua and Barbuda	Curaçao	2–1	CONCACAF Nations League Qualifier	Osbourne 1'; Benjamin 49'
September 6, 2019	Jamaica	Jamaica	0–6	CONCACAF Nations League B	
September 9, 2019	Antigua and Barbuda	Aruba	2–1	CONCACAF Nations League B	Bishop 8'; Harriette 69'
October 11, 2019	Antigua and Barbuda	Guyana	2–1	CONCACAF Nations League B	Griffith 15'; Benjamin 17'
October 14, 2019	Guyana	Guyana	1–5	CONCACAF Nations League B	Jarvis 48'
November 15, 2019	Antigua and Barbuda	Jamaica	0–2	CONCACAF Nations League B	
November 18, 2019	Curaçao	Aruba	2–3	CONCACAF Nations League B	Benjamin 36'; Harms 82' (o.g.); Bowry 84'
November 21, 2019	Guatemala	Guatemala	0–8	Friendly	
March 24, 2021	Curaçao	Montserrat	2–2	FIFA World Cup Qualifiers	Kirwan 23'; Bishop 45'
March 27, 2021	U.S. Virgin Islands	U.S. Virgin Islands	3–0	FIFA World Cup Qualifiers	Byers 26'; Griffith 34' (pen.), 42'
June 4, 2021	Antigua and Barbuda	Grenada	1–0	FIFA World Cup Qualifiers	Browne 20'
June 8, 2021	El Salvador	El Salvador	0–3	FIFA World Cup Qualifiers	
June 2, 2022	Saint Lucia	Barbados	1–0	CONCACAF Nations League B	Philip 90+1'
June 5, 2022	Saint Kitts and Nevis	Guadeloupe	1–0	CONCACAF Nations League B	Weston 55'
June 9, 2022	Saint Kitts and Nevis	Cuba	0–2	CONCACAF Nations League B	
June 12, 2022	Cuba	Cuba	1–3	CONCACAF Nations League B	Bishop 51'
March 23, 2023	Guadeloupe	Guadeloupe	1–0	CONCACAF Nations League B	Nathaniel-George 57'
March 26, 2023	Antigua and Barbuda	Barbados	1–2	CONCACAF Nations League B	Weston 31'
June 16, 2023	United States	Guadeloupe	0–5	Gold Cup Qualifiers	
September 9, 2023	Antigua and Barbuda	Guyana	1–5	CONCACAF Nations League B	Deterville 45'
September 12, 2023	Bahamas	Puerto Rico	0–5	CONCACAF Nations League B	
October 14, 2023	Bahamas	Bahamas	4–1	CONCACAF Nations League B	Stevens 3', 9'; Bramble 43'; Griffith 77' (pen.)
October 17, 2023	Antigua and Barbuda	Bahamas	2–2	CONCACAF Nations League B	Parker 54'; Bramble 59'
November 18, 2023	Antigua and Barbuda	Puerto Rico	2–3	CONCACAF Nations League B	Pereira 52'; Deterville 54'
November 21, 2023	Dominican Republic	Guyana	0–6	CONCACAF Nations League B	
June 5, 2024	Antigua and Barbuda	Bermuda	1–1	FIFA World Cup Qualifier	Deterville 26'
June 8, 2024	Cayman Islands	Cayman Islands	0–1	FIFA World Cup Qualifier	
September 7, 2024	Antigua and Barbuda	Dominica	1–2	CONCACAF Nations League B	Stevens 53'
September 10, 2024	Antigua and Barbuda	Bermuda	0–1	CONCACAF Nations League B	
October 12, 2024	Bermuda	Dominican Republic	0–5	CONCACAF Nations League B	
October 15, 2024	Bermuda	Dominican Republic	0–5	CONCACAF Nations League B	
November 16, 2024	Dominican Republic	Bermuda	1–2	CONCACAF Nations League B	Massicot 69'
November 19, 2024	Dominican Republic	Dominica	0–0	CONCACAF Nations League B	
June 6, 2025	Antigua and Barbuda	Cuba	0–1	FIFA World Cup Qualifier	
June 10, 2025	Honduras	Honduras	0–2	FIFA World Cup Qualifier	
November 19, 2024	Aruba	Aruba	0–0	CONCACAF Series	
June 10, 2025	Guyana	Guyana	1–4	CONCACAF Series	Griffith 61' (pen.)
