= 2005 CFU Club Championship =

Tournament details
- Dates: 12 September – 11 December
- Teams: 13 (from 9 associations)

Final positions
- Champions: (Jamaica) Portmore United (1st title)
- Runners-up: (Suriname) Robinhood

Tournament statistics
- Matches played: 22
- Goals scored: 77 (3.5 per match)
- Top scorer(s): (Saint Lucia) Kenwin McPhee (Northern United All Stars) (Jamaica) Omar Daley (Portmore United); 4 goals

The 2005 Caribbean Football Union Club Championship was an international club football competition held in the Caribbean to determine the region's qualifier to the CONCACAF Champions' Cup. The 2005 edition included 13 teams from 10 football associations, contested on a two-legged basis. Trinidad and Tobago champion North East Stars, which was only in its fourth year of existence, was given a bye to the quarterfinals. The club then withdrew before the quarterfinals due to a lack of financing. This allowed Surinamese champion Robinhood to eventually reach the final despite never playing a team from Jamaica or Trinidad and Tobago.

After Robinhood stunned Jamaican champion Portmore United with a first-leg victory, Portmore recovered to win the tournament with a decisive 4-0 win in the return leg, thereby advancing to the 2006 CONCACAF Champions' Cup.

== Teams ==
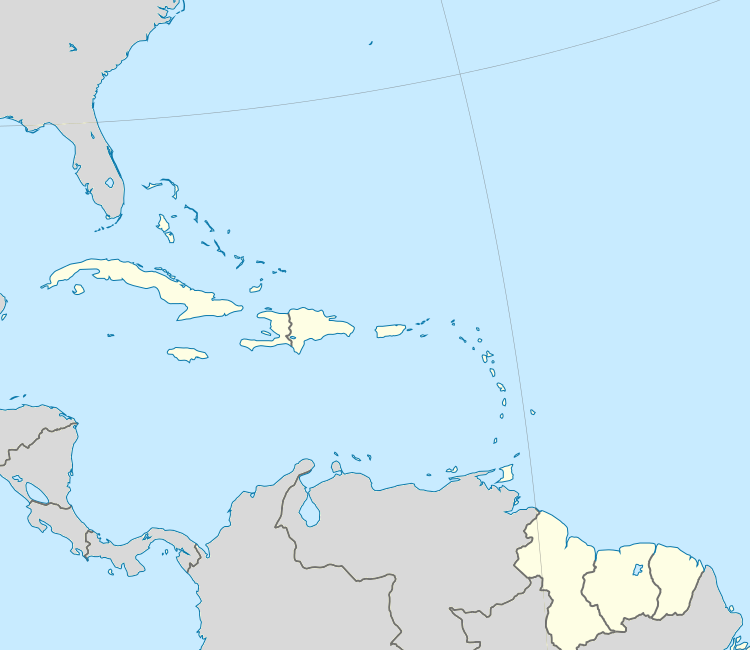
Location of teams of the 2005 CFU Club Championship

Association	Team	Qualification method	App. (last)	Previous best (last)
Netherlands Antilles	Barber	2004–05 Netherlands Antilles Championship winners	2nd (2003)	Second round (2003)
Netherlands Antilles	Victory Boys	2004–05 Netherlands Antilles Championship runners-up	1st	Debut
Aruba	Britannia	2004–05 Aruban Division di Honor champions	1st	Debut
Antigua and Barbuda	Bassa	2004–05 Antigua and Barbuda Premier Division winners	2nd (2004)	First round (2004)
Antigua and Barbuda	Hoppers	2004–05 Antigua and Barbuda Premier Division runners-up	1st	Debut
Dominica	Dublanc	2005 Dominica Premier League champions	1st	Debut
Dominica	South East	2005 Dominica Cup winners	1st	Debut
Jamaica	Portmore United	2004–05 Jamaica Premier League champions	2nd (2003)	Semi-finals (2003)
Saint Lucia	Northern United All Stars	2004–05 SLFA First Division champions	1st	Debut
Suriname	Robinhood	2004–05 SVB Eerste Divisie champions	3rd (2003)	First round (2000)
Suriname	Royal '95	2004–05 SVB Eerste Divisie runners-up	1st	Debut
Trinidad and Tobago	North East Stars	2004 TT Premier Football League champions	1st	Debut
U.S. Virgin Islands	Positive Vibes Victory	2004–05 USVISF Premier League champions	1st	Debut

== Bracket ==
First round
(Aruba) Britannia	1	0	1
(Suriname) Robinhood	2	2	4
(Suriname) Royal '95	0	1	1
(Netherlands Antilles) Victory Boys	0	3	3
(Saint Lucia) Northern United All Stars	0	5	5
(United States Virgin Islands) Positive Vibes Victory	2	0	2
(Dominica) Dublanc	0	1	1
(Antigua and Barbuda) Bassa	6	2	8
(Dominica) South East	1	0	1
(Antigua and Barbuda) Hoppers	2	4	6

Quarter-finals
(Suriname) Robinhood	–	–	w/o
(Trinidad and Tobago) ~~North East Stars~~	–	–	–
(Netherlands Antilles) Victory Boys	1	0	1
(Saint Lucia) Northern United All Stars	1	1	2
(Antigua and Barbuda) Bassa	1	2	3
(Netherlands Antilles) Barber	1	6	7
(Antigua and Barbuda) Hoppers	0	0	0
(Jamaica) Portmore United	3	7	10

Semi-finals
(Suriname) Robinhood	3	4	7
(Saint Lucia) Northern United All Stars	1	2	3
(Netherlands Antilles) Barber	1	1	2
(Jamaica) Portmore United	3	0	3

Final
(Suriname) Robinhood	2	0	2
(Jamaica) Portmore United	1	4	5

== Matches ==
=== First round ===
Team 1	Agg.	Team 2	1st leg	2nd leg
Royal '95 (Suriname)	1–3	(Netherlands Antilles) Victory Boys	0–0	1–3
Northern United All Stars (Saint Lucia)	5–2	(United States Virgin Islands) Positive Vibes Victory	0–2	5–0
South East (Dominica)	1–6	(Antigua and Barbuda) Hoppers	1–2	0–4
Dublanc (Dominica)	1–8	(Antigua and Barbuda) Bassa	0–6	1–2
Britannia (Aruba)	1–4	(Suriname) Robinhood	1–2	0–2

=== Matches ===
12 September 2005

Royal '95 (Suriname)	0–0	(Netherlands Antilles) Victory Boys

André Kamperveen Stadion, Paramaribo
24 September 2005

Victory Boys (Netherlands Antilles)	3–1	(Suriname) Royal '95
Moreno 31'; Permit 38'; A. Bernardus 67'		Emanuelson 75'

Stadion Victory Boys, Santa Rosa

Victory Boys won 3–1 on aggregate.

12 September 2005

Northern United All Stars (Saint Lucia)	0–2	(United States Virgin Islands) Positive Vibes Victory
		Guy 61'; Teshiera 80'

Gros Islet Cricket Oval, Gros Islet
1 October 2005

Positive Vibes Victory (United States Virgin Islands)	0–5	(Saint Lucia) Northern United All Stars
		Lastic 4'; McDonald 18'; Pamphile 24'; McPhee 55', 62'

Lionel Roberts Stadium, Charlotte Amalie

Northern United All Stars won 5–2 on aggregate.

22 September 2005

South East (Dominica)	1–2	(Antigua and Barbuda) Hoppers
Casimir 86'		T. Thomas 5'; Peters 76'

Antigua Recreation Ground, St. John's
24 September 2005

Hoppers (Antigua and Barbuda)	4–0	(Dominica) South East
Roberts 15'; Frederick 19', 72'; T. Thomas 59'

Antigua Recreation Ground, St. John's

Hoppers won 6–1 on aggregate.

23 September 2005

Dublanc (Dominica)	0–6	(Antigua and Barbuda) Bassa
		Burton 6', 29'; Anjis 41'; J. Thomas 45', 63'; Bevis 89'

Antigua Recreation Ground, St. John's
25 September 2005

Bassa (Antigua and Barbuda)	2–1	(Dominica) Dublanc
Jeffers 19'; Williams 42'		Pharo 52'

Antigua Recreation Ground, St. John's

Bassa won 8–1 on aggregate.

27 September 2005

Britannia (Aruba)	1–2	(Suriname) Robinhood
de Lange 37'		Aman. Massie 45'; Kinsaini 71'

Hasely Crawford Stadium, Port of Spain
29 September 2005

Robinhood (Suriname)	2–0	(Aruba) Britannia
Brown 29'; Aman. Massie 32'

Hasely Crawford Stadium, Port of Spain

Robinhood won 4–1 on aggregate.

=== Quarter-finals ===
Team 1	Agg.	Team 2	1st leg	2nd leg
Robinhood (Suriname)	w/o	(Trinidad and Tobago) North East Stars		
Bassa (Antigua and Barbuda)	3–7	(Netherlands Antilles) Barber	1–1	2–6
Hoppers (Antigua and Barbuda)	0–10	(Jamaica) Portmore United	0–3	0–7
Victory Boys (Netherlands Antilles)	1–2	(Saint Lucia) Northern United All Stars	1–1	0–1

=== Matches ===
12 October 2005

Robinhood (Suriname)	w/o	(Trinidad and Tobago) North East Stars

André Kamperveen Stadion, Paramaribo

North East Stars withdrew, Robinhood advances.

12 October 2005

Bassa (Antigua and Barbuda)	1–1	(Netherlands Antilles) Barber
Burton 77'		Palomina 86'

Antigua Recreation Ground, St. John's
26 October 2005

Barber (Netherlands Antilles)	6–2	(Antigua and Barbuda) Bassa
Meulens 11'; Martis 29'; S. Bernardus 31', 46'; Cassiani 70', 75'		J. Thomas 2'; Christian 59'

Ergilio Hato Stadium, Willemstad

Barber won 7–3 on aggregate.

14 October 2005

Hoppers (Antigua and Barbuda)	0–3	(Jamaica) Portmore United
		J. Morrison 32'; Daley 55'; Deerr 70'

Antigua Recreation Ground, St. John's
16 October 2005

Portmore United (Jamaica)	7–0	(Antigua and Barbuda) Hoppers
Ko. Wolfe 25'; Daley 30', 74'; Watson 47'; Reid 65'; G. Morrison 68'; Swaby 82'

Antigua Recreation Ground, St. John's

Portmore United won 10–0 on aggregate.

21 October 2005

Victory Boys (Netherlands Antilles)	1–1	(Saint Lucia) Northern United All Stars
Privania 19'		McPhee 59'

Stadion Victory Boys, Santa Rosa
29 October 2005

Northern United All Stars (Saint Lucia)	1–0	(Netherlands Antilles) Victory Boys
Lastic 82'

Gros Islet Cricket Oval, Gros Islet

Northern United All Stars won 2–1 on aggregate.

=== Semi-finals ===
Team 1	Agg.	Team 2	1st leg	2nd leg
Robinhood (Suriname)	7–3	(Saint Lucia) Northern United All Stars	3–1	4–2
Barber (Netherlands Antilles)	2–3	(Jamaica) Portmore United	1–3	1–0

=== Matches ===
9 November 2005

Robinhood (Suriname)	3–1	(Saint Lucia) Northern United All Stars
Zebeda 29'; Ong-A-Fat 48'; Amal. Massie 55'		Lastic 58'

André Kamperveen Stadion, Paramaribo
23 November 2005

Northern United All Stars (Saint Lucia)	2–4	(Suriname) Robinhood
Evans 12'; McPhee 79'		Amal. Massie 14', 27'; Zebeda 63'; Huur 83'

Gros Islet Cricket Oval, Gros Islet

Robinhood won 7–3 on aggregate.

30 November 2005

Barber (Netherlands Antilles)	1–3	(Jamaica) Portmore United
Molina 39'		Modeste 4' (pen.); Morrissey 28', 90'

Ergilio Hato Stadium, Willemstad
3 December 2005

Portmore United (Jamaica)	0–1	(Netherlands Antilles) Barber
		Sawyers 83' (o.g.)

Ergilio Hato Stadium, Willemstad

Portmore United won 3–2 on aggregate.

=== Final ===
Portmore United were crowned champions and advanced to the 2006 CONCACAF Champions' Cup.

Team 1	Agg.	Team 2	1st leg	2nd leg
Robinhood (Suriname)	2–5	(Jamaica) Portmore United	2–1	0–4

=== Matches ===
9 December 2005

Robinhood (Suriname)	2–1	(Jamaica) Portmore United
Brown 49'; Amak. Massie 71'		Modeste 86'

André Kamperveen Stadion, Paramaribo
11 December 2005

Portmore United (Jamaica)	4–0	(Suriname) Robinhood
Daley 15'; C. Morrison 50'; Ke. Wolfe 58'; Morrissey 77'

André Kamperveen Stadion, Paramaribo

Portmore United won 5–2 on aggregate.

== Top scorers ==
	Player	Club	Goals
1	(Saint Lucia) Kenwin McPhee	Northern United All Stars	4
1	(Jamaica) Omar Daley	Portmore United	4
3	(Saint Lucia) Francis Lastic	Northern United All Stars	3
3	(Antigua and Barbuda) Randolph Burton	Bassa	3
3	(Antigua and Barbuda) Jamie Thomas	Bassa	3
3	(Suriname) Amalilig Massie	Robinhood	3
3	(Jamaica) Steven Morrissey	Portmore United	3
8	(Antigua and Barbuda) Tamorley Thomas	Hoppers	2
8	(Antigua and Barbuda) Kelly Frederick	Hoppers	2
8	(Suriname) Amantie Massie	Robinhood	2
8	(Suriname) Jermaine Brown	Robinhood	2
8	(Curaçao) Shayron Bernardus	Barber	2
8	(Curaçao) Edgard Cassiani	Barber	2
8	(Suriname) Roberto Zebeda	Robinhood	2
8	(Grenada) Anthony Modeste	Portmore United	2
