= 2007 CFU Club Championship =

Tournament details
- Host country: Trinidad and Tobago
- Dates: 8 November 2007 – 25 May 2008
- Teams: 19 (from 12 associations)

Final positions
- Champions: (Jamaica) Harbour View (2nd title)
- Runners-up: (Trinidad and Tobago) Joe Public
- Third place: Puerto Rico Islanders
- Fourth place: (Trinidad and Tobago) San Juan Jabloteh

Tournament statistics
- Matches played: 30
- Goals scored: 130 (4.33 per match)
- Top scorer(s): (Haiti) Fabrice Noël (Puerto Rico Islanders); 8 goals

The 2007 CFU Club Championship was the annual international football club competition held in the Caribbean Football Union (CFU) region. Nineteen teams were to compete in the tournament, from November 4 to November 16 in six venues in Trinidad and Tobago. The first round consisted of five groups played in a round-robin format. The first round group winners along with the three best second-place teams advanced to the quarterfinals. The Caribbean Tournament Champion qualified to the 2008 CONCACAF Champions Cup.

The champion, runner-up and the third place team qualify for the 2008-09 CONCACAF Champions League. A playoff between the two losing semifinal teams will decide the 3rd place team.

St.Kitts & Nevis Newtown United and Positive Vibes of the US Virgin Islands withdrew from the competition on November 2 and the fixtures were rearranged.

== Teams ==
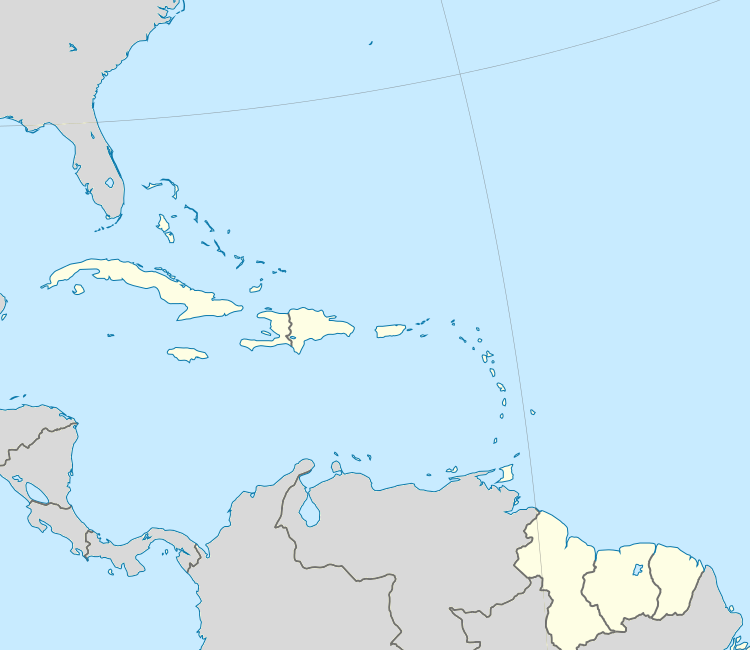
Location of teams of the 2007 CFU Club Championship

Association	Team	Qualification method	App. (last)	Previous best (last)
Netherlands Antilles	Barber	2006–07 Netherlands Antilles Championship winners	4th (2006)	Semi-finals (2005)
Netherlands Antilles	Jong Colombia	2006–07 Netherlands Antilles Championship runners-up	3rd (2003)	Second round (2003)
Aruba	Nacional	2006–07 Aruban Division di Honor champions	1st	Debut
Aruba	Racing Club Aruba	2006–07 Aruban Division di Honor runners-up	1st	Debut
Antigua and Barbuda	Bassa	2006–07 Antigua and Barbuda Premier Division winners	3rd (2005)	Quarter-finals (2005)
Antigua and Barbuda	SAP	2006–07 Antigua and Barbuda Premier Division runners-up	2nd (2006)	First round (2006)
Cuba	Pinar del Río	2006–07 Liga Nacional de Cuba champions	1st	Debut
Dominica	South East	2007 Dominica Premier League champions	2nd (2005)	First round (20065)
Haiti	Baltimore	2007 Championnat National Ouverture champions	2nd (2006)	Semi-finals (2006)
Jamaica	Harbour View	2006–07 National Premier League champions	5th (2006)	Champions (2004)
Jamaica	Portmore United	2006–07 National Premier League runners-up	3rd (2005)	Champions (2005)
Puerto Rico	Puerto Rico Islanders	Invited	2nd (2006)	First round (2006)
Saint Kitts and Nevis	Newtown United	2006–07 SKNFA Premier League champions	2nd (2003)	Preliminary round (2003)
Suriname	Inter Moengotapoe	2006–07 SVB Eerste Divisie champions	2nd (2004)	First round (2004)
Suriname	Leo Victor	2006–07 SVB Eerste Divisie runners-up	1st	Debut
Trinidad and Tobago (H)	San Juan Jabloteh	2007 TT Pro League champions	5th (2006)	Champions (2003)
Trinidad and Tobago (H)	Joe Public	2007 TT Pro League runners-up	3rd (2000)	Champions (2000)
U.S. Virgin Islands	Helenites	2006–07 USVISF Premier League champions	1st	Debut
U.S. Virgin Islands	Positive Vibes Victory	2006–07 USVISF Premier League runners-up	3rd (2006)	First round (2006)

== First round ==
=== Group A ===
Pos	Team	Pld	W	D	L	GF	GA	GD	Pts	Qualification
1	(Trinidad and Tobago) San Juan Jabloteh (H)	2	2	0	0	10	1	+9	6	Quarter-finals
2	(Aruba) Nacional	2	0	1	1	2	6	−4	1	
3	(Netherlands Antilles) Barber	2	0	1	1	1	6	−5	1	
4	(United States Virgin Islands) Positive Vibes Victory	0	0	0	0	0	0	0	0	Withdrew

Source: CONCACAF
(H) Hosts

=== Matches ===
4 November 2007
15:00

Nacional (Aruba)	1–1	(Netherlands Antilles) Barber
Cassiani 75' (o.g.)		Cassiani 16' (pen.)

Hasely Crawford Stadium, Port of Spain
4 November 2007
17:00

San Juan Jabloteh (Trinidad and Tobago)	Cancelled	(United States Virgin Islands) Positive Vibes Victory

Hasely Crawford Stadium, Port of Spain

6 November 2007
15:00

Positive Vibes Victory (United States Virgin Islands)	Cancelled	(Aruba) Nacional

Hasely Crawford Stadium, Port of Spain
6 November 2007
17:00

Barber (Netherlands Antilles)	0–5	(Trinidad and Tobago) San Juan Jabloteh
		Guerra 21', 78'; Gregory 24'; Byers 49'; Samuel 53'

Hasely Crawford Stadium, Port of Spain

8 November 2007
15:00

Barber (Netherlands Antilles)	Cancelled	(United States Virgin Islands) Positive Vibes Victory

Hasely Crawford Stadium, Port of Spain
8 November 2007
17:00

San Juan Jabloteh (Trinidad and Tobago)	5–1	(Aruba) Nacional
Byers 2'; John 57'; Gregory 62'; Jack 70'; Guerra 87'		Hooi 45'

Hasely Crawford Stadium, Port of Spain

=== Group B ===
Pos	Team	Pld	W	D	L	GF	GA	GD	Pts	Qualification
1	(Trinidad and Tobago) Joe Public (H)	2	2	0	0	12	0	+12	6	Quarter-finals
2	(Dominica) South East	2	0	1	1	1	6	−5	1	
3	Racing Club Aruba	2	0	1	1	1	8	−7	1	
4	(United States Virgin Islands) Helenites	0	0	0	0	0	0	0	0	Moved to Group D

Source: CONCACAF
(H) Hosts

=== Matches ===
4 November 2007
15:00

Racing Club Aruba	1–1	(Dominica) South East
Escalona 50'		Monroe 2'

Marvin Lee Stadium, Macoya
4 November 2007
17:00

Joe Public (Trinidad and Tobago)	Cancelled	(United States Virgin Islands) Helenites

Marvin Lee Stadium, Macoya

6 November 2007
15:00

Helenites (United States Virgin Islands)	Cancelled	Racing Club Aruba

Marvin Lee Stadium, Macoya
6 November 2007
19:00

South East (Dominica)	0–5	(Trinidad and Tobago) Joe Public
		K. Thomas 19'; McAllister 24'; Baptiste 40', 45'; Richardson 43'

Marvin Lee Stadium, Macoya

8 November 2007
15:00

Helenites (United States Virgin Islands)	Cancelled	(Dominica) South East

Ato Boldon Stadium, Couva
8 November 2007
17:00

Joe Public (Trinidad and Tobago)	7–0	Racing Club Aruba
Baptiste 18', 52', 78'; Andrews 63'; Davis 65', 89'; Noray 82'

Marvin Lee Stadium, Macoya

=== Group C ===
Pos	Team	Pld	W	D	L	GF	GA	GD	Pts	Qualification
1	Puerto Rico Islanders	3	2	1	0	17	4	+13	7	Quarter-finals
2	(Jamaica) Harbour View	3	1	1	1	13	4	+9	4	Quarter-finals
3	(Suriname) Inter Moengotapoe	3	1	1	1	7	9	−2	4	
4	(Antigua and Barbuda) SAP	3	0	1	2	3	23	−20	1	

Source: CONCACAF

=== Matches ===
4 November 2007
15:00

SAP (Antigua and Barbuda)	3–3	(Suriname) Inter Moengotapoe
Mack 36'; Mckel 38'; Murray 72'		Pinas 16', 64'; Meiedjan 52'

Manny Ramjohn Stadium, Marabella
4 November 2007
17:00

Harbour View (Jamaica)	2–2	Puerto Rico Islanders
Bryan 20'; Taylor 90'		N. Delgado 7', 14'

Manny Ramjohn Stadium, Marabella

6 November 2007
15:00

Puerto Rico Islanders	10–0	(Antigua and Barbuda) SAP
Herrera 2'; Noël 11', 45', 47', 48'; Zapata 45+', 51', 74'; Vélez 72'; A. Delgado 88'

Manny Ramjohn Stadium, Marabella
6 November 2007
17:00

Inter Moengotapoe (Suriname)	2–1	(Jamaica) Harbour View
Adensida 45+'; Damba 80'		Hue 16'

Manny Ramjohn Stadium, Marabella

8 November 2007
15:00

Puerto Rico Islanders	5–2	(Suriname) Inter Moengotapoe
Zapata 7'; N. Delgado 14'; Villegas 17'; Noël 89'; A. Delgado 90+'

Ato Boldon Stadium, Couva
8 November 2007
17:00

Harbour View (Jamaica)	10–0	(Antigua and Barbuda) SAP
L. Thomas 11'; Taylor 35', 55'; Hue 45'; Bryan 51', 84', 90'; Edwards 70'; Peterkin 72'; Kelly 82'

Ato Boldon Stadium, Couva

=== Group D ===
Pos	Team	Pld	W	D	L	GF	GA	GD	Pts	Qualification
1	(Jamaica) Portmore United	2	2	0	0	5	0	+5	6	Quarter-finals
2	(Suriname) Leo Victor	2	1	0	1	4	3	+1	3	Quarter-finals
3	(United States Virgin Islands) Helenites	2	0	0	2	0	6	−6	0	
4	(Saint Kitts and Nevis) Newtown United (Note: After Newtown United withdrew, Helenites from Group A were moved to Group D to fill their spot.)	0	0	0	0	0	0	0	0	Withdrew

Source: CONCACAF

=== Matches ===
4 November 2007
17:00

Portmore United (Jamaica)	2–0	(United States Virgin Islands) Helenites
Modeste 2'; Austin 46'

Larry Gomes Stadium, Arima

6 November 2007
17:00

Helenites (United States Virgin Islands)	0–4	(Suriname) Leo Victor
		Kinsaini 28'; Grant 33'; Sastromedjo 51', 81'

Marvin Lee Stadium, Macoya

8 November 2007
19:00

Portmore United (Jamaica)	3–0	(Suriname) Leo Victor
Morrissey 28'; Lowe 41'; Wolfe 75'

Marvin Lee Stadium, Macoya

=== Group E ===
Pos	Team	Pld	W	D	L	GF	GA	GD	Pts	Qualification
1	(Haiti) Baltimore	3	2	1	0	16	3	+13	7	Quarter-finals
2	(Antigua and Barbuda) Bassa	3	2	0	1	7	4	+3	6	Quarter-finals
3	(Cuba) Pinar del Río	3	1	1	1	8	5	+3	4	
4	(Netherlands Antilles) Jong Colombia	3	0	0	3	2	21	−19	0	

Source: CONCACAF

=== Matches ===
4 November 2007
15:00

Pinar del Río (Cuba)	5–1	(Netherlands Antilles) Jong Colombia
Gutiérrez 4', 11'; Núñez 24'; Izaguirre 30'; M. Martínez 79'		Torbed 22'

Guaracara Park, Pointe-à-Pierre
4 November 2007
17:00

Baltimore (Haiti)	2–1	(Antigua and Barbuda) Bassa
Elestin 51', 59'		Christian 87'

Guaracara Park, Pointe-à-Pierre

6 November 2007
15:00

Bassa (Antigua and Barbuda)	2–1	(Cuba) Pinar del Río
J. Thomas 48'; Christian 62'		Alcántara 8'

Guaracara Park, Pointe-à-Pierre
6 November 2007
17:00

Jong Colombia (Netherlands Antilles)	0–12	(Haiti) Baltimore
		N/A 9' (o.g.); Elestin 11', 22', 38', 55'; Ednilson 19'; Junior 31'; Emerlin 70', 76'; Pierre 75'; Michel 83', 89'

Guaracara Park, Pointe-à-Pierre

8 November 2007
15:00

Jong Colombia (Netherlands Antilles)	1–4	(Antigua and Barbuda) Bassa
Clemencia 90'		Burton 44', 52', 58'; J. Thomas 71'

Guaracara Park, Pointe-à-Pierre
8 November 2007
17:00

Pinar del Río (Cuba)	2–2	(Haiti) Baltimore
R. Martínez 67'; Morales 72'		Germain 48', 65'

Guaracara Park, Pointe-à-Pierre

=== Ranking of second-place teams ===
Pos	Grp	Team	Pld	W	D	L	GF	GA	GD	Pts	Qualification
1	E	(Antigua and Barbuda) Bassa	3	2	0	1	7	4	+3	6	Quarter-finals
2	C	(Jamaica) Harbour View	3	1	1	1	13	4	+9	4	Quarter-finals
3	D	(Suriname) Leo Victor	2	1	0	1	4	3	+1	3	Quarter-finals
4	A	(Aruba) Nacional	2	0	1	1	2	6	−4	1	
5	B	(Dominica) South East	2	0	1	1	1	6	−5	1	

Source: CONCACAF

== Knockout round ==
=== Bracket ===
Quarter-finals
Puerto Rico Islanders	7
(Suriname) Leo Victor	1
(Trinidad and Tobago) Joe Public	5
(Antigua and Barbuda) Bassa	0
(Jamaica) Portmore United	0
(Jamaica) Harbour View	2
(Trinidad and Tobago) San Juan Jabloteh	1
(Haiti) Baltimore	0

Semi-finals
Puerto Rico Islanders	0
(Trinidad and Tobago) Joe Public	1
(Jamaica) Harbour View (p)	0 (10)
(Trinidad and Tobago) San Juan Jabloteh	0 (9)

Final
(Trinidad and Tobago) Joe Public	1	–	1
(Jamaica) Harbour View	2	–	2
Third place
Puerto Rico Islanders	1	0	1
(Trinidad and Tobago) San Juan Jabloteh	0	0	0

=== Quarter-finals ===
11 November 2007

Portmore United (Jamaica)	0–2	(Jamaica) Harbour View
		Taylor 32'; Bryan 81'

Manny Ramjohn Stadium, Marabella
11 November 2007

San Juan Jabloteh (Trinidad and Tobago)	1–0	(Haiti) Baltimore
Gregory 63'

Manny Ramjohn Stadium, Marabella
11 November 2007

Puerto Rico Islanders	7–1	(Suriname) Leo Victor
Noël 18', 22'; Vélez 33'; Zapata 57'; Steele 58'; N. Delgado 68'; Johnson 90'		Gardan 43'

Marvin Lee Stadium, Macoya
11 November 2007

Joe Public (Trinidad and Tobago)	5–0	(Antigua and Barbuda) Bassa
Nelson 25', 30', 51'; Baptiste 75'; N/A

Marvin Lee Stadium, Macoya

=== Semi-finals ===
14 November 2007

Harbour View (Jamaica)	0–0	(Trinidad and Tobago) San Juan Jabloteh
Penalties
	10–9

Marvin Lee Stadium, Macoya
14 November 2007

Puerto Rico Islanders	0–1	(Trinidad and Tobago) Joe Public
		Richardson 80'

Marvin Lee Stadium, Macoya

=== Final ===
16 November 2007

Joe Public (Trinidad and Tobago)	1–2	(Jamaica) Harbour View
Baptiste 16'		Taylor 21'; Bryan 23'

Marvin Lee Stadium, Macoya

=== Third place match ===
10 May 2008

Puerto Rico Islanders	1–0	(Trinidad and Tobago) San Juan Jabloteh
Noël 9'	Report

Estadio Juan Ramón Loubriel, Bayamón
Attendance: 1,600
25 May 2008

San Juan Jabloteh (Trinidad and Tobago)	0–0	Puerto Rico Islanders

Hasely Crawford Stadium, Port of Spain

Puerto Rico Islanders won 1–0 on aggregate.

== Top scorers ==
	Player	Club	Goals
1	(Haiti) Fabrice Noël	Puerto Rico Islanders	8
2	(Trinidad and Tobago) Kerry Baptiste	Joe Public	7
3	(Jamaica) Kavin Bryan	Harbour View	6
3	(Haiti) Luxene Elestin	Baltimore	6
5	(Jamaica) Fabian Taylor	Harbour View	5
5	(Panama) Alberto Zapata	Puerto Rico Islanders	5
7	(United States) Noah Delgado	Puerto Rico Islanders	5
8	(Trinidad and Tobago) Ataullah Guerra	San Juan Jabloteh	3
8	(Trinidad and Tobago) Gason Gregory	San Juan Jabloteh	3
8	(Antigua and Barbuda) Randolph Burton	Bassa	3
8	(Jamaica) Roen Nelson	Joe Public	3
