= Dave Carr (footballer, born 1982) =

Antigua and Barbuda footballer

Personal information
- Full name: Dave Carr
- Date of birth: January 27, 1982 (age 44)
- Place of birth: Antigua and Barbuda
- Position: Defender

Senior career*
| Years | Team | Apps | (Gls) |
| 2003–2006 | Hoppers | | |
| 2006–2011 | Bassa | | |
| 2011 | Antigua Barracuda | 5 | (0) |

International career^{‡}
| 2002–2012 | Antigua and Barbuda | 29 | (0) |
- * Club domestic league appearances and goals as of June 3, 2011 ‡ National team caps and goals as of June 18, 2012

Dave Carr (born January 27, 1982) is an Antiguan footballer who is currently without a club and plays internationally for the Antigua and Barbuda national team.

== Club career ==
Carr began his career in 2003 with Hoppers of the Antigua and Barbuda Premier Division. He spent three seasons with the Hoppers, playing for them in the CFU Club Championship in 2005, before transferring to league rivals Bassa S.C. in 2006. With Bassa Carr won three Premier Division titles in 2006–07, 2007–08 and 2009–10, and two Antigua and Barbuda FA Cup titles in 2008 and 2010.

Carr signed with Antigua Barracuda FC on April 8, 2011 prior to its first season in the USL Professional Division. He made his debut for the Barracudas in their first competitive game on April 17, 2011, a 2–1 loss to the Los Angeles Blues.

== International career ==
Nicknamed Little Man, Carr made his debut for Antigua and Barbuda in a November 2002 CONCACAF Gold Cup qualification match against the Netherlands Antilles and has earned nearly 20 caps since. He played in 4 FIFA World Cup qualification games, and was part of the Antigua squad which took part in the final stages of the 2010 Caribbean Championship.

=== National team statistics ===
Antigua and Barbuda national team
| Year | Apps | Goals |
|---|---|---|
| 2002 | 1 | 0 |
| 2003 | 1 | 0 |
| 2004 | 3 | 0 |
| 2005 | 0 | 0 |
| 2006 | 6 | 0 |
| 2007 | 0 | 0 |
| 2008 | 7 | 0 |
| 2009 | 1 | 0 |
| 2010 | 2 | 0 |
| Total | 21 | 0 |
