= Jamie Thomas (disambiguation) =

Jamie Thomas is an American skateboarder.

Jamie Thomas may also refer to:

- Jamie Thomas (footballer, born 1985), Antiguan international footballer
- Jamie Thomas (soccer, born 1992), American soccer player
- Jamie Thomas (footballer, born 1997), English-born Welsh footballer
- "Jamie Thomas", a song by Graham Coxon from his album The Golden D

== See also ==
- Jaimie Thomas (born 1986), American football player
- James Thomas (disambiguation)
