= Jim Thomas =

Jim Thomas may refer to:

== In sport ==
- Jim Thomas (basketball) (born 1960), American basketball player
- Jim Thomas (offensive lineman) (1917–1981), American football player
- Jim Thomas (running back) (1938–2015), running back who played nine seasons in the Canadian Football League
- Jim Thomas (tennis) (born 1974), American politician and former tennis player
- Jimmy Thomas (American football) (1947–2017), National Football League running back

== Other people ==
- Jim Thomas (executive) (born 1959), American businessman
- Jim Thomas (poet) (1930–2009), Romanian poet
- Jim Thomas (screenwriter), American screenwriter
- Jim Thomas (computer scientist) (1946–2010), American computer scientist
- Jim Thomas (zoologist), Australian zoologist, co-founder of Tenkile Conservation Alliance, alumnus of La Trobe University

== See also ==
- James Thomas (disambiguation)
