= GHLL =

American literary magazine

- Type: annual magazine
- Format: online magazine
- Owner: Truman State University
- Editor: Adam Brooke Davis
- Founded: 1990
- Headquarters: Kirksville, Missouri
- Price: open access
- ISSN: 1089-2060
- Website: Official Site

GHLL (originally The Green Hills Literary Lantern) is a literary journal published by Truman State University. Founded in 1990 by Jack Smith, a professor of English and Philosophy at North Central Missouri College as an inexpensively-produced outlet for student and faculty work, the annual quickly grew to a regional and national mission. Towards the end of its existence as a print publication, the magazine typically consisted of 300 pages of poetry, fiction and nonfiction prose.

In 2005, due to financial issues, the journal moved to an open-access, web-only format. The first digital issue was XVII. It was among the earliest of academic literary magazines available exclusively online and quickly collected a 'Best of the Web" award

Listings in professional directories characterize the editorial policy as open, though with “emphasis on craft.” GHLL reviews poetry and novels from lesser-known, independent presses

Prose is selected by Adam Brooke Davis, verse by poet and novelist Joe Benevento. The editorial board has included Geoffrey Clark, Erin Flanagan, Barry Kitterman, Robert Garner McBrearty, Midge Raymond, Doug Rennie, Jude Russell, Nat Smith, John Talbird, and Mark Wisniewkski.

GHLL has a tradition of openness to first-time authors, though a number of writers have made multiple appearances, including fiction writers Karl Harshbarger, William Eisner, Ian MacMillan, DeWitt Henry (founder of Ploughshares), Virgil Suarez and Walter Cummins. Regularly contributing poets include Lisa Alexander Baron, Jim Thomas, Joanne Lowery, Lee Rossi, David Lawrence, Mark Belair, Nancy Cherry, Sudie Nostrand, Terry Savoie, Francine Marie Tolf, Fredrick Zydek, William Jollif, Lee Slonimsky, Terry Godbey, Rachel Squires Bloom and Yvette Schnoeker-Shorb, as well as the first poet laureate of Missouri, Walter Bargen. The journal is indexed by numerous directories, including the American Directory of Writer's Guidelines, Writers’ Market (various editions), the International Directory of Literary and Little Magazines, Index of American Periodical Verse

GHLL has announced that the final issue (Volume XXXVI) will appear July 1, 2025. https://ghll.truman.edu/

== See also ==
- List of literary magazines
