= Molvin James =

Antigua and Barbudan footballer

Personal information
- Full name: Molvin James
- Date of birth: 4 May 1989 (age 37)
- Place of birth: Antigua and Barbuda
- Position: Goalkeeper

Team information
- Current team: Antigua Barracuda FC
- Number: 18

Senior career*
Years	Team	Apps	(Gls)
2006–2007	Young Warriors		
2007–2011	Villa Lions		
2011–2013	Antigua Barracuda FC	20	(0)

International career^{‡}
2007–	Antigua and Barbuda	49	(0)
- * Club domestic league appearances and goals as of 20 August 2012 ‡ National team caps and goals as of 14:49, 2 April 2016 (UTC)

Molvin James (born 4 May 1989) is an Antiguan footballer who currently plays for Antigua Barracuda FC in the USL Professional Division.

== Club career ==
James began his career with Young Warriors in the Antiguan First Division, before moving to Villa Lions in the Antigua and Barbuda Premier Division in 2007.

After 4 seasons with Villa Lions, James signed with Antigua Barracuda FC in the USL Professional Division. He made his debut for the club on 17 April 2011 in a 2–1 loss against the Los Angeles Blues.

== International career ==
James made his debut for the Antigua and Barbuda national team in 2007. He played in two of Antigua's qualification games for the 2010 FIFA World Cup, both against Cuba, but unfortunately conceded 8 goals in the process. He was also part of the Antigua squad which took part on the final stages of the 2010 Caribbean Championship.
