= Dany Luis Quintero =

Cuban footballer (born 1984)

Dany Quintero
Personal information
- Full name: Danis Luis Quintero Chevans
- Date of birth: December 10, 1984 (age 41)
- Place of birth: Cienfuegos, Cuba
- Height: 1.90 m (6 ft 3 in)
- Position: Goalkeeper

Team information
- Current team: Rheinfelden

Youth career
- 1997–2002: Cienfuegos

Senior career*
Years	Team	Apps	(Gls)
2002–2009	Cienfuegos	90	(0)
2009–2010	Valdevez	18	(0)
2010–2013	Nollingen	10	(0)
2013–	Rheinfelden	105	(0)

International career
1998–1999	Cuba U-17	9	(0)
2002	Cuba U-20	6	(0)
2007–2008	Cuba	7	(0)
- * Club domestic league appearances and goals

Danis Luis Quintero Chevans (born 10 December 1984 in Cienfuegos, Cienfuegos Province) is a Cuban footballer, who is currently playing for German amateur side FSV Rheinfelden.

== Club career ==
Quintero began play with FC Cienfuegos and played eight years for the team before fleeing the country. After a trial with Swiss side Servette he signed for C.A. Valdevez in summer 2009. After a half-year in Portugal, he left Valdevez in February 2010 to sign on 2 February 2010 for the German lower League club SV Nollingen.

In 2013 he joined FSV Rheinfelden.

== International career ==
He made his international debut for Cuba in a January 2007 Caribbean Cup qualification match against Guadeloupe and has earned a total of 7 caps, scoring no goals.

During 2010 FIFA World Cup qualification campaign he played four matches. He was part of the under-20 national team in the qualification for the 2003 FIFA World Youth Championship. He was part of the Cuba national football team at 2007 Caribbean Nations Cup and back-up keeper at 2007 CONCACAF Gold Cup.

His final international was a December 2008 Caribbean Cup qualification match against Guadeloupe.

== Personal life ==
=== Defection to Germany ===
Nicknamed Pulpo (The Octopus), Quintero disappeared from the national team at Frankfurt Airport or Düsseldorf Airport in July 2009 after a friendly match against German Bundesliga side SC Freiburg. After spending time in Switzerland and Portugal he returned to Germany and received a political refugee status after a few months.
