= Fabrice Noël =

Haitian footballer (born 1985)

Personal information
- Date of birth: July 21, 1985 (age 41)
- Place of birth: Gressier, Haiti
- Height: 1.78 m (5 ft 10 in)
- Position: Striker

Senior career*
Years	Team	Apps	(Gls)
2001–2002	Racing Club Haïtien		
2005–2006	Colorado Rapids	16	(6)
2007–2009	Puerto Rico Islanders	55	(11)
2010	Shanghai East Asia	28	(10)
2013–2014	San Antonio Scorpions	26	(14)
2014	ATM FA	8	(3)
2015	Tampines Rovers	2	(1)
2015	Kuantan FA	14	(6)
2016	Abahani Limited		
2016	Kuala Lumpur FA	0	(0)

International career
2006–2014	Haiti	20	(5)
- * Club domestic league appearances and goals

Fabrice Noël (born July 21, 1985) is a Haitian former professional footballer who played as a striker.

== Club career ==
=== Early life and career in Haiti ===
Noël grew up poor in the village of Gressier, 12 miles west of Port-au-Prince. He began playing soccer at a very young age, taught by his mother and brothers. By the time he was 12 years old he was playing for the national team for 15-year-olds, and at the age of 16 he was one of the star players of Racing Club Haïtien, one of the country's most successful club teams.

However, his skills and success ultimately brought tragedy. In November 2002, while Noël was in South Carolina taking part in an international tournament, he received a phone call from his mother, telling him that his two older brothers Luckner and Kenson had been shot to death. Their murders are thought to have been carried out by supporters of a rival club that he had refused to join. Noël was granted political asylum in the United States, but his parents and youngest brother were forced to go into hiding.

After the ordeal, in late 2002, he went to live with a former coach in Palm Beach, Florida, and enrolled in Palm Beach Lakes High School. He joined the soccer team and quickly became the star, scoring 58 goals his senior season.

=== Colorado Rapids ===
Noël received many offers from colleges, but turned them all down, instead choosing to turn professional in order to raise the money to bring his family to the United States. While playing in a local tournament in February 2005, he caught the eye of Colorado Rapids head coach Fernando Clavijo, who offered him a contract after he graduated high school. On June 24, 2005, Noël signed with the Rapids; he made his debut less than a month later on July 20, against the San Jose Earthquakes, and scored his first goal in the season finale against Real Salt Lake.

=== Puerto Rico Islanders ===
During the 2007 MLS pre-season, the Rapids waived Noël, who subsequently signed with the Puerto Rico Islanders in the USL First Division. Noël scored the only goal in the two-legged 3rd place match in the CFU Club Championship 2007, enabling the Islanders to advance to the CONCACAF Champions League 2008–09.

=== Shanghai East Asia ===
In February 2010, Noël moved to China and signed a contract with Shanghai East Asia. On 4 April he made his league debut for Shanghai in the 2–0 victory over Guangdong Sunray Cave, replacing Jiang Zhipeng in the 55th minute.

=== San Antonio Scorpions ===
Noël returned to the United States in 2013, signing for the San Antonio Scorpions in the North American Soccer League. Upon his signing, Noël declared that "I feel very lucky to be a part of the Scorpions. We have a lot of good players and I cannot wait to help the team. I'm looking forward to it."

=== ATM FA ===
In 2014, it was announced that Noël had signed with ATM FA, a Malaysian club, for the 2014 Malaysia Super League Season. Noël was signed as a replacement for St-Vincent striker Marlon James who had retired from professional football.

=== Tampines Rovers ===
Following the appointment of V Sundramoorthy as head coach of S.League title contenders Tampines Rovers for the 2015 S.League Season, Sundram signed filled all five of Tampines' foreign players roster with foreigners formerly plying their trade in Malaysia. Utilising his intimate knowledge of Malaysian football, Sundram signed Noël after the latter was released by ATM FA.

Noël notched Tampines' first goal of the season, following a defensive mix up in the Albirex Niigata Singapore box, securing a 1-0 opening match victory for his new club.

Noël left the club after just three months at the club, citing personal reasons.

=== Kuantan FA ===
On 8 April 2015 Fabrice Noel join Malaysian side Kuantan FA.

=== Kuala Lumpur FA ===
On 16 June 2016 Fabrice Noel join Malaysian side Kuala Lumpur FA.

== International career ==
Noël made his debut for the Haiti national football team in an August 2006 friendly match against Guatemala. He was a Haiti squad member at the 2007 & 2009 Gold Cup Finals

== Personal life ==
With the help of the Colorado Rapids organization, Noël set up a fund, known as the Fabrice Noël Fund in order to raise money for his parents and brothers transport to the United States.

== Honours ==
Puerto Rico Islanders

- USL First Division Championship runner-up: 2008
- Commissioner's Cup: 2008
- CFU Club Championship runner-up: 2009
