= James Thomas =

James Thomas may refer to:

== Politicians ==
- James Thomas (Australian politician) (1826–1884), civil engineer who was director of public wWorks in Western Australia, 1876–1884
- James Thomas (Governor of Maryland) (1785–1845), served as the 23rd governor of the state of Maryland
- James Thomas, 1st Viscount Cilcennin (1903–1960), Conservative politician in the UK, and former first lord of the Admiralty
- James C. Thomas (1889–1958), New York assemblyman
- James E. Thomas (Iowa auditor) (1894-1984), American state auditor of Iowa
- J. H. Thomas (James Henry Thomas, 1874–1949), British trade unionist and Labour politician
- James Houston Thomas (1808–1876), US congressman from Tennessee
- James John Thomas (1868–1947), mayor of Columbus, Ohio
- James S. Thomas (mayor) (1802–1874), mayor of St. Louis

== Musicians ==
- James Thomas (English musician) (born 1963), director of music of St Edmundsbury Cathedral
- James Thomas (blues musician) (1926–1993), American Delta blues musician

== Sportsmen ==
- James Thomas (basketball) (born 1980), American basketball player
- James Thomas (footballer, born 1979), Welsh footballer
- James Thomas (footballer, born 1997), English footballer
- James Thomas (rugby union) (born 1990), Welsh rugby union player
- Jim Thomas (running back) (James T. Thomas, 1938–2015), head college football coach for the Mississippi Valley State University Delta Devils
- James Thomas Jr., American football coach

== Others ==
- James Burrows Thomas (born 1935), Australian judge
- James Samuel Thomas (1919–2010), Bishop of the United Methodist Church
- J. T. Thomas (Survivor contestant) (born 1984), winner of Survivor: Tocantins
- James Thomas (professor), professor at the University of Utah
- James Thomas (priest) (1918–2005), Dean of Saint Paul's Cathedral, Wellington
- James E. Thomas (1879–1944), Churches of Christ minister in Australia
- James Kay Thomas (1902–1989), West Virginia Attorney General
- James Francis Thomas (1861–1942), solicitor from Tenterfield, New South Wales
- James Havard Thomas (1854–1921), Welsh sculptor

== See also ==
- Jimmy Thomas (American football) (1947–2017), former National Football League running back
- Jim Thomas (disambiguation)
- Jamie Thomas (disambiguation)
