= 2008 Caribbean Cup qualification =

2008 Caribbean Cup qualification details the qualifying stages for entrants to the 2008 Caribbean Cup, an association football event held between the nations of the Caribbean.

== Preliminary round ==
=== Format ===
The five group winners along with the four best second-place teams will be placed into three groups hosted by Guadeloupe, Cuba and Trinidad & Tobago from 11 October - 9 November.

=== Teams that did not enter ===
Nine CFU teams did not enter, meaning 4 fewer participants than in the Caribbean Nations Cup 2006-07 edition. (This became 2 fewer participants, when 2 further teams withdrew during the 2006-07 tournament). Two teams withdrew before the tournament began (French Guiana and Sint Maarten), and the 7 other teams listed below participated only in World Cup Qualification)

1. Bahamas
2. Dominican Republic
3. French Guiana

4. Montserrat
5. Puerto Rico
6. Sint Maarten

7. Turks and Caicos Islands
8. U.S. Virgin Islands
9. Saint Lucia

=== Group A ===
All Group A matches were hosted by the Nederlands Antilliaanse Voetbal Unie, the governing body for association football in the Netherlands Antilles.

Team	Pld	W	D	L	GF	GA	GD	Pts
Netherlands Antilles	2	1	1	0	2	0	+2	4
Grenada	2	1	0	1	3	3	0	3
Aruba	2	0	1	1	1	3	-2	1

Notes

- Saint Lucia were originally the third team, but they dropped out and Dominica took their place.
- Dominica switched to Group B the day before the first match, and Aruba took their place.
27 July 2008

Netherlands Antilles	0–0	Aruba
	Report

Stadion Ergilio Hato, Willemstad
Attendance: 995
Referee: Geoffrey Hospedales (Trinidad and Tobago)

29 July 2008

Grenada	3–1	Aruba
J. Rennie 53'; Modeste 76'; S. Rennie 79'	Report	Ruiz 50'

Stadion Ergilio Hato, Willemstad
Attendance: 450
Referee: Philip Jordan (Trinidad and Tobago)

31 July 2008

Netherlands Antilles	2–0	Grenada
Bacuna 79'; Bicintini 81'	http://www.concacaf.com/competitions/matchreport/7251.pdf

Stadion Ergilio Hato, Willemstad
Attendance: 800
Referee: Geoffrey Hospedales (Trinidad and Tobago)

=== Group B ===
All Group B matches were hosted by the Guyana Football Federation, the governing body for association football in Guyana.

Team	Pld	W	D	L	GF	GA	GD	Pts
Guyana	2	1	1	0	4	1	+3	4
Suriname	2	1	1	0	4	2	+2	4
Dominica	2	0	0	2	1	6	-5	0

Notes

- Suriname qualify as one of 4 best runners-up.
- Aruba were originally in Group B, but they dropped out and later rejoined the tournament in Group A. Dominica took their place in this group.
8 August 2008

Guyana	3–0	Dominica
Codrington 20', 43'; Edmonds 36'	http://www.concacaf.com/competitions/matchreport/7252.pdf

National Stadium, Providence
Attendance: 3,000
Referee: Mark Forde (Barbados)

9 August 2008

Dominica	1–3	Suriname
Austrie 7'	http://www.concacaf.com/competitions/matchreport/7253.pdf	Felter 18'; Sandvliet 54'; Jap A Joe 81'

National Stadium, Providence
Attendance: 175
Referee: Trevor Taylor (Barbados)

10 August 2008

Guyana	1–1	Suriname
Peters 90+2'	http://www.concacaf.com/competitions/matchreport/7254.pdf	Sastromedjo 22'

National Stadium, Providence
Attendance: 10,000
Referee: Mark Forde (Barbados)

=== Group C ===
All Group C matches were hosted by the Cayman Islands Football Association.

Team	Pld	W	D	L	GF	GA	GD	Pts
Antigua and Barbuda	3	2	1	0	8	3	+5	7
Cayman Islands	3	1	2	0	4	1	+3	5
Bermuda	3	1	1	1	7	4	+3	4
Saint-Martin	3	0	0	3	2	13	-11	0

Notes

- Antigua and Barbuda were originally excluded, but eventually were allowed to play.
- Matches originally scheduled for 29 August were pushed back until 30 August due to Hurricane Gustav.
27 August 2008

Bermuda	0–4	Antigua and Barbuda
	http://www.concacaf.com/competitions/matchreport/7255.pdf	Thomas 4', 29' (pen.); Burton 63'; Challenger 79'

Truman Bodden Stadium, George Town
Attendance: 300
Referee: Howard Stennett (Jamaica)
27 August 2008

Cayman Islands	3–0	Saint-Martin
Jefford 58'; Sanchez 68'; Hill 90'	http://www.concacaf.com/competitions/matchreport/7256.pdf

Truman Bodden Stadium, George Town
Attendance: 300
Referee: Kevin Thomas (Jamaica)

30 August 2008

Cayman Islands	1–1	Antigua and Barbuda
Taylor 67'	http://www.concacaf.com/competitions/matchreport/7260.pdf	Christian 33'

Truman Bodden Stadium, George Town
Attendance: 350
Referee: Jeoffrey Hospadalis (Trinidad and Tobago)
30 August 2008

Saint-Martin	0–7	Bermuda
		Lambe 27', 45', 58', 86'; Ming 29'; Castle 85', 89'

Truman Bodden Stadium, George Town
Attendance: 350
Referee: Kevin Morrison (Jamaica)

31 August 2008

Antigua and Barbuda	3–2	Saint-Martin
Thomas 44', 68'; Gregory 89'		Pierre 53', 58'

Truman Bodden Stadium, George Town
Attendance: 350
Referee: Kevin Morrison (Jamaica)
31 August 2008

Cayman Islands	0–0	Bermuda
	http://www.concacaf.com/competitions/matchreport/7262.pdf

Truman Bodden Stadium, George Town
Attendance: 350
Referee: Geoffrey Hospedales (Trinidad and Tobago)

=== Group D ===
All Group D matches were hosted by the Saint Kitts and Nevis Football Association.

Team	Pld	W	D	L	GF	GA	GD	Pts
Barbados	2	2	0	0	5	2	+3	6
Saint Kitts and Nevis	2	1	0	1	5	3	+2	3
British Virgin Islands	2	0	0	2	1	6	-5	0

Notes

- Dominica were originally the third team, but British Virgin Islands took their place when Dominica was moved to Group B.
24 September 2008

Saint Kitts and Nevis	4–0	British Virgin Islands
Francis 15'; Archibald 31'; Venton 52' (o.g.); Lake 77'	http://www.concacaf.com/competitions/matchreport/7263.pdf

Warner Park, Basseterre
Attendance: 500
Referee: Martin Charles (Dominica)

26 September 2008

British Virgin Islands	1–2	Barbados
Lennon 15'	http://www.concacaf.com/competitions/matchreport/7264.pdf	Williams 11'; Forde 53'

Warner Park, Basseterre
Attendance: 150
Referee: Ignatius Baptiste (Dominica)

28 September 2008

Saint Kitts and Nevis	1–3	Barbados
Isaac 13'	http://www.concacaf.com/competitions/matchreport/7265.pdf	Straker 35'; Skeete 45'; Williams 80'

Warner Park, Basseterre
Attendance: 500
Referee: Martin Charles (Dominica)

=== Group E ===
All Group E matches were hosted by Ligue de Football de Martinique, the governing body for association football in Martinique.

Team	Pld	W	D	L	GF	GA	GD	Pts
Martinique	2	2	0	0	6	1	5	6
Saint Vincent and the Grenadines	2	1	0	1	3	4	-1	3
Anguilla	2	0	0	2	2	6	-4	0

15 September 2008

Martinique	3–0	Saint Vincent and the Grenadines
Richards 3' (o.g.); Percin 46'; McDowald 47' (o.g.)	http://www.concacaf.com/competitions/matchreport/7266.pdf

Stade d'Honneur de Dillon, Fort-de-France
Attendance: 250
Referee: John George (Saint Lucia)

17 September 2008

Saint Vincent and the Grenadines	3–1	Anguilla
Francis 37'; Hamlet 39'; Samuel 74'	http://www.concacaf.com/competitions/matchreport/7267.pdf	Jeffers 38' (o.g.)

Stade d'Honneur de Dillon, Fort-de-France
Attendance: 100
Referee: Francis Fanus (Saint Lucia)

19 September 2008

Martinique	3–1	Anguilla
Percin 19'; Saint-Louis-Augustin 37'; Bullet 51'	Report	Battice 83'

Stade Louis Achille, Fort-de-France

== Qualifying round ==
Cuba, Guadeloupe, Trinidad and Tobago automatically qualified for this round. Haiti and Jamaica receive bye to third round.

=== Group F ===
Played in Guadeloupe from October 11–15.

Team	Pld	W	D	L	GF	GA	GD	Pts
Guadeloupe	3	3	0	0	12	3	+9	9
Grenada	3	1	1	1	7	6	+1	4
Martinique	3	1	1	1	4	5	−1	4
Cayman Islands	3	0	0	3	3	12	−9	0

11 October 2008

Martinique	2–2	Grenada
Sabin 28', 55'	http://www.concacaf.com/competitions/matchreport/7326.pdf	S. Rennie 12', 43'

Stade René Serge Nabajoth, Les Abymes
Attendance: 1,700
Referee: Martin Charles (Dominica)
11 October 2008

Guadeloupe	7–1	Cayman Islands
Antoine-Curier 4', 43', 58'; Gotin 34'; Hannany 68', 80'; Gendrey 76'	http://www.concacaf.com/competitions/matchreport/7327.pdf	Fagan 86'

Stade René Serge Nabajoth, Les Abymes
Attendance: 4,200
Referee: Roy McArthur (Guyana)

13 October 2008

Cayman Islands	0–1	Martinique
	http://www.concacaf.com/competitions/matchreport/7328.pdf	Sabin 31'

Stade René Serge Nabajoth, Les Abymes
Attendance: 1,000
Referee: James Matthew (Saint Kitts and Nevis)
13 October 2008

Guadeloupe	2–1	Grenada
Collet 23'; Loval 36'	http://www.concacaf.com/competitions/matchreport/7329.pdf	Charles 15'

Stade René Serge Nabajoth, Les Abymes
Attendance: 1,000
Referee: Bryan Willett (Antigua and Barbuda)

15 October 2008

Grenada	4–2	Cayman Islands
Bain 43'; S. Rennie 45', 79'; Charles 67'	Report	Brown-Morphy 31', 82'

Stade René Serge Nabajoth, Les Abymes
Attendance: 3,358
Referee: Bryan Willett (Antigua and Barbuda)
15 October 2008

Guadeloupe	3–1	Martinique
Loval 40'; Antoine-Curier 50'; Gotin 87'	http://www.concacaf.com/competitions/matchreport/7331.pdf	Sabin 17'

Stade René Serge Nabajoth, Les Abymes
Attendance: 3,358
Referee: Roy McArthur (Guyana)

=== Group G ===
Played in Cuba from October 23–27.

Team	Pld	W	D	L	GF	GA	GD	Pts
Cuba	3	2	1	0	14	2	+12	7
Barbados	3	2	1	0	6	4	+2	7
Suriname	3	1	0	2	4	10	−6	3
Netherlands Antilles	3	0	0	3	3	11	−8	0

23 October 2008

Barbados	3–2	Suriname
Forde 62', 65', 70'		Sandvliet 33'; Aroepa 42'

Estadio Pedro Marrero, Havana
Attendance: 100
Referee: Kevin Morrison (Jamaica)
23 October 2008

Cuba	7–1	Netherlands Antilles
Duarte 21', 45'; Márquez 25'; Linares 39', 86'; Colomé 79'; Clavelo 82'		Bernardus 61'

Estadio Pedro Marrero, Havana
Attendance: 1,000
Referee: Alfredo Whittaker (Cayman Islands)

25 October 2008

Suriname	2–1	Netherlands Antilles
Wanabo 70', 76'	http://www.concacaf.com/competitions/matchreport/7339.pdf	Rosario 81'

Estadio Pedro Marrero, Havana
Attendance: 1,000
Referee: Kenville Holder (Cayman Islands)
25 October 2008

Cuba	1–1	Barbados
Clavelo 68'	http://www.concacaf.com/competitions/matchreport/7340.pdf	Doyle 66'

Estadio Pedro Marrero, Havana
Attendance: 1,000
Referee: Courtney Campbell (Jamaica)

27 October 2008

Netherlands Antilles	1–2	Barbados
Bicintini 45'	http://www.concacaf.com/competitions/matchreport/7341.pdf	Forde 6' (pen.); Parris 20'

Estadio Pedro Marrero, Havana
Attendance: 1,000
Referee: Kevin Morrison (Jamaica)
27 October 2008

Cuba	6–0	Suriname
Cervantes 11', 43'; Márquez 49'; Linares 55'; Duarte 65'; Dranguet 72'	http://www.concacaf.com/competitions/matchreport/7342.pdf

Estadio Pedro Marrero, Havana
Attendance: 1,000
Referee: Kenville Holder (Cayman Islands)

=== Group H ===
Played in Trinidad and Tobago from November 5–9.

Team	Pld	W	D	L	GF	GA	GD	Pts
Trinidad and Tobago	3	2	1	0	7	4	+3	7
Antigua and Barbuda	3	2	0	1	8	7	+1	6
Guyana	3	0	2	1	3	4	−1	2
Saint Kitts and Nevis	3	0	1	2	5	8	−3	1

5 November 2008

Guyana	1–1	Saint Kitts and Nevis
Richardson 35'	http://www.concacaf.com/competitions/matchreport/7343.pdf	Lake 29'

Marvin Lee Stadium, Macoya
Attendance: 750
Referee: Caswell Cambridge (St Vincent and the Grenadines)
5 November 2008

Trinidad and Tobago	3–2	Antigua and Barbuda
Glen 68'; Dwarika 73'; Toussaint 87'	http://www.concacaf.com/competitions/matchreport/7344.pdf	Byers 23'; Burton 90'

Marvin Lee Stadium, Macoya
Attendance: 750
Referee: Antonius Pinas (Suriname)

7 November 2008

Antigua and Barbuda	2–1	Guyana
Leigertwood 11'; Christian 78'	http://www.concacaf.com/competitions/matchreport/7345.pdf	Jerome 45'

Marvin Lee Stadium, Macoya
Referee: Willy Minyetty (Dominican Republic)
7 November 2008

Trinidad and Tobago	3–1	Saint Kitts and Nevis
Daniel 37'; Hyland 65'; Jorsling 66'	http://www.concacaf.com/competitions/matchreport/7346.pdf	Francis 86'

Marvin Lee Stadium, Macoya
Referee: Enrico Wijngaarde (Suriname)

9 November 2008

Saint Kitts and Nevis	3–4	Antigua and Barbuda
Francis 57', 70', 80'	http://www.concacaf.com/competitions/matchreport/7347.pdf	Byers 7', 45' (pen.); Thomas 60', 73'

Marvin Lee Stadium, Macoya
Attendance: 1,000
Referee: Enrico Wijngaarde (Suriname)
9 November 2008

Trinidad and Tobago	1–1	Guyana
Jorsling 85'	http://www.concacaf.com/competitions/matchreport/7348.pdf	Richardson 58' (pen.)

Marvin Lee Stadium, Macoya
Attendance: 1,000
Referee: Willy Minyetty (Dominican Republic)
