= Akeem Thomas =

Antiguan footballer

Personal information
- Full name: Akeem Thomas
- Date of birth: January 5, 1990 (age 36)
- Place of birth: Antigua and Barbuda
- Height: 2.03 m (6 ft 8 in)
- Position: Midfielder

Team information
- Current team: Caledonia AIA
- Number: 20

Senior career*
Years	Team	Apps	(Gls)
2009–2010	Bassa		
2011–2012	Antigua Barracuda FC	32	(0)
2013–	Caledonia AIA	7	(0)

International career^{‡}
2008–	Antigua and Barbuda	47	(3)
- * Club domestic league appearances and goals as of August 20, 2012 ‡ National team caps and goals as of 14:52, 2 April 2016 (UTC)

Akeem Thomas (born January 5, 1990) is an Antiguan footballer who currently plays for Caledonia AIA and the Antigua and Barbuda national team.

== Club career ==
Thomas began his career in 2009 playing for Bassa in the Antigua and Barbuda Premier Division, and helped the team win the Premier Division title in his first season with the team.

In 2011 Thomas transferred to the new Antigua Barracuda FC team prior to its first season in the USL Professional Division. He made his debut for the Barracudas on April 17, 2011, in the team's first competitive game, a 2–1 loss to the Los Angeles Blues.

== International career ==
Thomas made his debut for the Antigua and Barbuda national team in 2008, and has since gone on to make 13 appearances for his country, scoring one goal. He was also part of the Antigua squad which took part in the final stages of the 2010 Caribbean Championship.

Thomas performed as a center back in the 2014 CFU Caribbean Cup. Those performances have invited interest from a host of professional clubs around the world, Tottenham Hotspur of England and Elche FC of Spain, to name a few. Thomas has been earmarked as one of the leaders on the national team, along with official captain, Quinton Groffith, currently of the Charleston Battery in the United Soccer League (USL), the second tier of soccer in the United States. His progress has been attributed to hard work and dedication by many former and current coaches.

=== National team statistics ===
Antigua and Barbuda national team
Year	Apps	Goals
2008	3	0
2009	1	0
2010	8	1
2011	1	0
Total	13	1

=== International goals ===
Scores and results list Antigua and Barbuda's goal tally first.

Goal	Date	Venue	Opponent	Score	Result	Competition
1.	21 July 2010	Marvin Lee Stadium, Macoya, Trinidad and Tobago	Trinidad and Tobago	1–2	1–4	Friendly
2.	7 September 2014	Antigua Recreation Ground, St. John's, Antigua and Barbuda	Saint Vincent and the Grenadines	1–1	2–1	2014 Caribbean Cup qualification
3.	15 March 2015	Antigua Recreation Ground, St. John's, Antigua and Barbuda	Dominica	1–0	1–0	Friendly
