= Mario Swaby =

Jamaican footballer (born 1982)

Personal information
- Full name: Mario Swaby
- Date of birth: 7 November 1982 (age 44)
- Place of birth: Kingston, Jamaica
- Position: Midfielder

Team information
- Current team: Portmore United

Senior career*
Years	Team	Apps	(Gls)
2002–	Portmore United		

International career^{‡}
2007–	Jamaica	8	(0)
- * Club domestic league appearances and goals as of 7 September 2011 ‡ National team caps and goals as of 7 September 2011

Mario Swaby (born 7 November 1982) is a Jamaican international footballer who plays for Portmore United, as a midfielder.

== Career ==
Swaby has played club football for Portmore United.

He made his international debut for Jamaica in 2007.
