= Kerry Skepple =

Antiguan and Barbudan footballer (born 1980)

Personal information
- Full name: Kerry Kadie Skepple
- Date of birth: November 25, 1980 (age 45)
- Place of birth: New Winthropes, Antigua and Barbuda
- Height: 1.75 m (5 ft 9 in)
- Position: Midfielder

Team information
- Current team: Antigua Barracuda FC

Youth career
- 2006–2007: Indiana Wesleyan

Senior career*
Years	Team	Apps	(Gls)
2001–2002	English Harbour FC		
2002–2003	Villa Lions FC	80	(22)
2003–2005	English Harbour FC	46	(13)
2005–2006	SAP		
2007–2008	Bullets		
2008	→ Atlantis FC (loan)	7	(3)
2008–2012	All Saints United		
2009	→ Atlantis FC (loan)	8	(2)
2012–	Antigua Barracuda FC	20	(0)

International career^{‡}
2002–	Antigua and Barbuda	25	(2)
- * Club domestic league appearances and goals as of 09:50, 24 May 2008 (UTC) ‡ National team caps and goals as of 29 December 2008

Kerry “Arab” Skepple (born 25 November 1980) is an Antiguan and Barbudan footballer, currently playing for Antigua Barracuda FC.

== Club career ==
Skepple was born in New Winthropes, Antigua, and played for several teams in Antigua before attending college at Indiana Wesleyan University, United States, where he played from 2004 to 2007. In 2005 he was, along with compatriot Troy Mellanson, member of the MCC All-Conference 2nd Team

In 2008, he spent some time in the Finnish second division with Atlantis FC for whom he scored a decisive goal to avoid relegation in October 2008.

He returned to Antigua and debuted for All Saints United F.C. against Villa Lions on 23 November 2008.

== International career ==
Skepple made his debut for Antigua and Barbuda in a February 2001 friendly match against Saint Lucia and has earned nearly 20 caps since. He played in 5 World Cup qualification games. On November 11, 2011, Skepple scored the winning goal against Haiti to qualify for the third round of CONCACAF qualifying for World Cup 2014.

== National team statistics ==
Antigua and Barbuda national team
Year	Apps	Goals
2002	2	0
2003	3	0
2004	3	1
2006	2	1
2008	7	4
2010	5	0
2011	9	2
2012	4	0
Total	35	8

Scores and results list Antigua and Barbuda's goal tally first.

No.	Date	Venue	Opponent	Score	Result	Competition
1.	21 March 2004	Warner Park Sporting Complex, Basseterre, St. Kitts and Nevis	Saint Kitts and Nevis	3-0	3-2	Friendly
2.	24 February 2006	MacKenzie Sports Club Ground, Linden, Guyana	Guyana	1-2	1-2	Friendly
3.	6 February 2008	Trinidad Stadium, Oranjestad, Aruba	Aruba	2-0	3-0	2010 FIFA World Cup qualification
4.	18 May 2008	Antigua Recreation Ground, St.John's, Antigua and Barbuda	Antigua and Barbuda	1-1	6-1	Friendly
5.	8 June 2008	Sir Vivian Richards Stadium, Saint George, Antigua and Barbuda	Saint Kitts and Nevis	1-0	2-0	Friendly
6.	17 June 2008	Sir Vivian Richards Stadium, Saint George, Antigua and Barbuda	Cuba	2-1	3-4	2010 FIFA World Cup qualification
7.	26 August 2011	Antigua Recreation Ground, St.John's, Antigua and Barbuda	Saint Vincent and the Grenadines	1-0	1-0	Friendly
8.	11 November 2011	Coolidge Cricket Ground, Saint George, Antigua and Barbuda	Haiti	1-0	1-0	2014 FIFA World Cup qualification
