= Lennox Julian =

Antigua and Barbudan footballer (born 1983)

Personal information
- Full name: Lennox Julian
- Date of birth: 28 May 1983 (age 43)
- Place of birth: Antigua and Barbuda
- Position: Midfielder

Team information
- Current team: Bassa Sports Club

Senior career*
Years	Team	Apps	(Gls)
2003–	Bassa		

International career^{‡}
2004–2008	Antigua and Barbuda	13	(1)
- * Club domestic league appearances and goals as of 21:33, 23 May 2008 (UTC) ‡ National team caps and goals as of 30 December 2008

Lennox Julian (born 28 May 1983) is an Antiguan and Barbudan footballer, currently playing for Bassa FC in the Antigua and Barbuda Premier Division.

== International career ==
Nicknamed Fox, Julian made his debut for Antigua and Barbuda in a February 2004 FIFA World Cup qualification match against the Netherlands Antilles and has earned nearly 20 caps since. He played in 4 FIFA World Cup qualification games.

== National team statistics ==
Antigua and Barbuda national team
Year	Apps	Goals
2004	4	0
2005	1	0
2006	2	0
2007	0	0
2008	6	0
Total	13	0

=== International goals ===
Scores and results list Antigua and Barbuda's goal tally first.

Goal	Date	Venue	Opponent	Score	Result	Competition
1.	21 September 2008	Antigua Recreation Ground, St. John's, Antigua and Barbuda	Guyana	3–0	3–0	Friendly
