= Teran Williams =

Antigua and Barbudan footballer (born 1984)

Personal information
- Full name: Teran Williams
- Date of birth: 20 November 1984 (age 41)
- Place of birth: Antigua and Barbuda
- Position: Midfielder

Team information
- Current team: Antigua Barracuda FC
- Number: 22

Senior career*
Years	Team	Apps	(Gls)
2004–2005	Bassa		
2007–2011	SAP FC		
2011–	Antigua Barracuda FC	0	(0)

International career^{‡}
2004–	Antigua and Barbuda	20	(2)
- * Club domestic league appearances and goals as of 3 June 2011 ‡ National team caps and goals as of 19 April 2011

Teran Williams (born 20 November 1984) is an Antiguan footballer who plays for Antigua Barracuda FC in the USL Professional Division.

== Club career ==
Williams began his professional career in 2004 with Bassa in the Antigua and Barbuda Premier Division, before moving to SAP FC in 2007. He was part of the Bassa team which won the Antigua and Barbuda Premier Division title in 2004–05, and later helped SAP to the Premier Division-Antigua and Barbuda FA Cup double in 2008–09.

In 2011, Williams transferred to the new Antigua Barracuda FC team prior to its first season in the USL Professional Division.

== International career ==
Williams made his debut for Antigua and Barbuda in a November 2004 CONCACAF Gold Cup qualification match against Saint Lucia and has earned nearly 20 caps since. He played in all four of Antigua's qualification games for the 2010 FIFA World Cup, and was one of Antigua's goal scorers in the 4–3 loss to Cuba on 17 June 2008.

=== International goals ===
Scores and results list Antigua and Barbuda's goal tally first.

Goal	Date	Venue	Opponent	Score	Result	Competition
1.	18 May 2008	Antigua Recreation Ground, St. John's, Antigua and Barbuda	Saint Lucia	?	6–1	Friendly
2.	17 June 2008	Sir Vivian Richards Stadium, North Sound, Antigua and Barbuda	Cuba	1–0	3–4	2010 FIFA World Cup qualification
