= Thomas Jordan (footballer) =

Barbadian footballer and manager

Personal information
- Place of birth: Barbados

International career
| Years | Team | Apps | (Gls) |
- Barbados

Managerial career
- 2008–2010: Barbados

Thomas Jordan is a Barbadian professional football player and manager.

== Career ==
He played for the national team.

Since 2008 until 2010 he coached the Barbados national football team.
