= George Dublin =

Antiguan footballer

Personal information
- Full name: George Dublin
- Date of birth: 11 February 1977 (age 49)
- Place of birth: Antigua and Barbuda
- Position: Defender

Team information
- Current team: Montserrat (assistant coach)

Senior career*
Years	Team	Apps	(Gls)
1997–2002	Hoppers FC		
2002–2006	Joe Public		
2006–2007	Hoppers		
2007–2008	Tobago United		
2007–2008	→ Hoppers (loan)		
2008–2011	Hoppers		
2011–2013	Antigua Barracuda FC	41	(1)
2018–20??	Hoppers		

International career^{‡}
2000–2012	Antigua and Barbuda	66	(4)
- * Club domestic league appearances and goals as of 20 August 2012 ‡ National team caps and goals as of 16 September 2011

George Dublin (born 11 February 1977) is an Antiguan footballer who is currently assistant coach of the Montserrat national football team.

== Club career ==
Dublin began his career in his native Antigua and Barbuda with Hoppers FC, before moving to Trinidad and Tobago with Joe Public. He was part of the Joe Public side which won the TT Pro League title in 2006. He moved to Tobago United in 2007, but spent just one season there before returning to Antigua to play for Hoppers in the Antigua and Barbuda Premier Division.

In 2011, Dublin transferred to the new Antigua Barracuda FC team prior to its first season in the USL Professional Division. He made his debut for the Barracudas on April 17, 2011, in the team's first competitive game, a 2–1 loss to the Los Angeles Blues. He captained the team.

As of 2018, he had returned to Hoppers.

== International career ==
Nicknamed Sowa, Dublin made his debut for Antigua and Barbuda in an April 2000 FIFA World Cup qualification match against Bermuda and has earned over 30 caps since. He played in 9 World Cup qualification games, and was part of the Antigua squad which took part in the final stages of the 2010 Caribbean Championship.

=== National team statistics ===
Antigua and Barbuda national team
Year	Apps	Goals
2000	4	0
2001	0	0
2002	0	0
2003	3	0
2004	5	1
2005	1	0
2006	7	0
2007	1	0
2008	11	1
2009	2	0
2010	2	0
2011	10	2
2012	13	0
Total	67	4

=== International goals ===
Scores and results list Antigua and Barbuda's goal tally first.

No	Date	Venue	Opponent	Score	Result	Competition
1.	6 November 2004	Warner Park Sporting Complex, Basseterre, Saint Kitts and Nevis	Saint Lucia	1–2	1–2	2005 Caribbean Cup qualification
2.	6 February 2008	Trinidad Stadium, Oranjestad, Aruba	Aruba	1–0	3–0	2010 FIFA World Cup qualification
3.	28 August 2011	Antigua Recreation Ground, St. John's, Antigua and Barbuda	United States	1–1	2–2	Friendly
4.	6 September 2011	Paul E. Joseph Stadium, Frederiksted, U.S. Virgin Islands	U.S. Virgin Islands	5–1	8–1	2014 FIFA World Cup qualification

== Coaching ==
Dublin holds a level 2 coaching license and established a youth soccer team.
