= Jairo Sanchez-Scott =

Caymanian footballer

Jairo Sanchez
Personal information
- Full name: Jairo Geovanny Sanchez-Scott
- Date of birth: 10 December 1987 (age 38)
- Place of birth: Cayman Islands
- Position: Midfielder

Team information
- Current team: Elite SC

Senior career*
| Years | Team | Apps | (Gls) |
| 2007– | Elite SC | | |

International career^{‡}
- Cayman Islands U20
- Cayman Islands U23
| 2004– | Cayman Islands | 11 | (1) |
- * Club domestic league appearances and goals ‡ National team caps and goals as of 06:07, 20 April 2012 (UTC)

Jairo Geovanny Sanchez-Scott (born 10 December 1987) is a Caymanian footballer who plays as a midfielder. He has represented the Cayman Islands during World Cup qualifying matches in 2011.
