= Roy Gregory (footballer) =

Antigua and Barbudan footballer

Personal information
- Full name: Roy Gregory
- Date of birth: March 6, 1990 (age 36)
- Place of birth: Antigua and Barbuda
- Position: Defender

Team information
- Current team: Antigua Barracuda FC
- Number: 19

Senior career*
Years	Team	Apps	(Gls)
2007–2009	Freemansville		
2009–2011	All Saints United		
2011–	Antigua Barracuda FC	19	(0)

International career^{‡}
- Antigua and Barbuda U17
- Antigua and Barbuda U20
2008–	Antigua and Barbuda	18	(2)
- * Club domestic league appearances and goals as of September 16, 2011 ‡ National team caps and goals as of September 16, 2011

Roy Gregory (born March 6, 1990) is an Antiguan footballer who currently plays for Antigua Barracuda FC in the USL Professional Division and the Antigua and Barbuda national team.

== Club career ==
Gregory began his professional career in 2007 with Freemansville in the Antigua and Barbuda Premier Division, and spent two seasons there, before moving to All Saints United in 2009.

In 2011 Gregory transferred to the new Antigua Barracuda FC team prior to its first season in the USL Professional Division. He made his debut for the Barracudas in their first competitive game on April 17, 2011, a 2–1 loss to the Los Angeles Blues.

== International career ==
Gregory made his debut for the Antigua and Barbuda national team in 2008, and has since gone on to make fifteen appearances for his country, scoring two goal.

=== National team statistics ===
Antigua and Barbuda national team
Year	Apps	Goals
2008	9	1
2009	1	0
2010	4	0
2011	1	0
Total	15	1

=== International goals ===
Scores and results list Antigua and Barbuda's goal tally first.

Goal	Date	Venue	Opponent	Score	Result	Competition
1.	31 August 2008	Truman Bodden Sports Complex, George Town, Cayman Islands	Saint Martin	3–2	3–2	2008 Caribbean Cup qualification
2.	28 June 2009	Grenada National Stadium, St. George's, Grenada	Grenada	2–2	2–2	Friendly
