= Aklie Edwards =

Trinidadian football player

Personal information
- Full name: Aklie Edwards
- Date of birth: June 17, 1985 (age 41)
- Place of birth: Point Fortin, Trinidad and Tobago
- Height: 1.93 m (6 ft 4 in)
- Position: Defender

Team information
- Current team: Defence Force
- Number: 21

Youth career
- Fyzabad Composite
- Siparia Junior Secondary
- South West Drillers

Senior career*
Years	Team	Apps	(Gls)
2006–present	Defence Force	-	(-)

International career^{‡}
2008–	Trinidad and Tobago	23	(1)
- * Club domestic league appearances and goals as of 00:00, 22 February 2009 (UTC) ‡ National team caps and goals as of 13 August 2009

Aklie Edwards (born June 7, 1985) is a Trinidadian football player. He plays as a defender for TT Pro League side Defence Force.

== Club career ==
Edwards began his professional career with TT Pro League side Defence Force. He is regarded as one of the top defenders in the league. Although he has played as a central defender, his primary position is left back.

Edwards play with the National Team has helped him receive interest from several Major League Soccer clubs.

== International career ==
Edwards made his debut for the Trinidad and Tobago national football team on January 26, 2008 in a 2-2 draw with Puerto Rico. He scored his first senior international goal against Barbados on May 11, 2008 in a 3-0 victory for the Soca Warriors. He also started in Trinidad and Tobago's famous 2-1 victory over the United States in a 2010 World Cup qualifier. In total Edwards has represented his country 22 times, scoring 1 goal.

== National team career statistics ==
=== Goals for Senior National Team ===
#	Date	Venue	Opponent	Score	Result	Competition
1	May 11, 2008	Macoya, Trinidad and Tobago	Barbados	3-0	Won	Friendly
