= Randolph Burton =

Antiguan footballer (born 1987)

Personal information
- Full name: Randolph Burton
- Date of birth: January 14, 1987 (age 39)
- Place of birth: Antigua and Barbuda
- Position: Midfielder

Team information
- Current team: Antigua Barracuda FC
- Number: 25

Senior career*
| Years | Team | Apps | (Gls) |
| 2004–2011 | Bassa | | |
| 2011–2013 | Antigua Barracuda FC | 21 | (3) |

International career^{‡}
| 2008– | Antigua and Barbuda | 37 | (15) |
- * Club domestic league appearances and goals as of September 16, 2011 ‡ National team caps and goals as of September 16, 2011

Randolph Burton (born January 14, 1987) is an Antiguan footballer who currently plays for Antigua Barracuda FC in the USL Professional Division and the Antigua and Barbuda national team.

== Club career ==
Burton began his professional career in 2004, and spent seven seasons playing with Bassa in the Antigua and Barbuda Premier Division. With Bassa, Burton has won five Premier Division titles - in 2003–04, 2004–05, 2006–07, 2007–08 and 2009-10 - as well as two Antigua and Barbuda FA Cup titles in 2008 and 2010.

Burton also played for Bassa in three CFU Club Championship campaigns. He scored a hat trick for his team in a 10–1 win over Curaçaoan team CRKSV Jong Colombia in the 2007 tournament.

In 2011 Burton transferred to the new Antigua Barracuda FC team prior to its first season in the USL Professional Division. He made his debut for the Barracudas on April 21, 2011, a 1–0 loss to Sevilla FC Puerto Rico.

== International career ==
Burton made his debut for the Antigua and Barbuda national team in 2008, and has since gone on to make 19 appearances for his country, scoring 6 goals. He played in two of his country's qualification games for the 2010 FIFA World Cup, against Aruba and Cuba, and was part of the Antigua squad which took part in the final stages of the 2010 Caribbean Championship.

=== National team statistics ===
Antigua and Barbuda national team
| Year | Apps | Goals |
|---|---|---|
| 2008 | 1 | 5 |
| 2009 | 9 | 0 |
| 2010 | 10 | 4 |
| 2011 | 8 | 6 |
| Total | 28 | 15 |

=== International goals ===
Scores and results list Antigua and Barbuda's goal tally first.

| Goal | Date | Venue | Opponent | Score | Result | Competition |
|---|---|---|---|---|---|---|
| 1. | 18 May 2008 | Antigua Recreation Ground, St. John's, Antigua and Barbuda, Antigua and Barbuda | Saint Lucia | 3–1 | 6–1 | Friendly |
| 2. | 18 May 2008 | Antigua Recreation Ground, St. John's, Antigua and Barbuda, Antigua and Barbuda | Saint Lucia | 6–0 | 6–1 | Friendly |
| 3. | 27 August 2008 | Truman Bodden Sports Complex, George Town, Cayman Islands | Bermuda | 3–0 | 4–0 | 2008 Caribbean Cup qualification |
| 4. | 21 September 2008 | Antigua Recreation Ground, St. John's, Antigua and Barbuda | Guyana | 1–0 | 3–0 | 2008 Caribbean Cup qualification |
| 5. | 5 November 2008 | Marvin Lee Stadium, Macoya, Trinidad and Tobago | Trinidad and Tobago | 3–2 | 3–2 | 2008 Caribbean Cup qualification |
| 6. | 28 August 2010 | Warner Park Sporting Complex, Basseterre, Saint Kitts and Nevis | Saint Kitts and Nevis | ? | 1–1 | Friendly |
| 7. | 23 September 2010 | Antigua Recreation Ground, St. John's, Antigua and Barbuda | Saint Lucia | 1–0 | 5–0 | Friendly |
| 8. | 23 September 2010 | Antigua Recreation Ground, St. John's, Antigua and Barbuda | Saint Lucia | 3–0 | 5–0 | Friendly |
| 9. | 10 November 2010 | Antigua Recreation Ground, St. John's, Antigua and Barbuda | Suriname | 1–0 | 2–1 | 2010 Caribbean Cup qualification |
| 10. | 27 May 2011 | Grenada National Stadium, St. George's, Grenada | Grenada | 2–1 | 2–2 | Friendly |
| 11. | 6 September 2011 | Paul E. Joseph Stadium, Frederiksted, United States Virgin Islands | U.S. Virgin Islands | 7–1 | 8–1 | 2014 FIFA World Cup qualification |
| 12. | 6 September 2011 | Paul E. Joseph Stadium, Frederiksted, United States Virgin Islands | U.S. Virgin Islands | 8–1 | 8–1 | 2014 FIFA World Cup qualification |
| 13. | 30 September 2011 | Stanford Cricket Ground, Saint George Parish, Antigua and Barbuda | Martinique | 1–0 | 1–0 | Friendly |
| 14. | 11 October 2011 | Sir Vivian Richards Stadium, North Sound, Antigua and Barbuda | U.S. Virgin Islands | 6–0 | 10–0 | 2014 FIFA World Cup qualification |
| 15. | 11 October 2011 | Sir Vivian Richards Stadium, North Sound, Antigua and Barbuda | U.S. Virgin Islands | 7–0 | 10–0 | 2014 FIFA World Cup qualification |
