= Peter Byers (footballer) =

Antiguan footballer (born 1984)

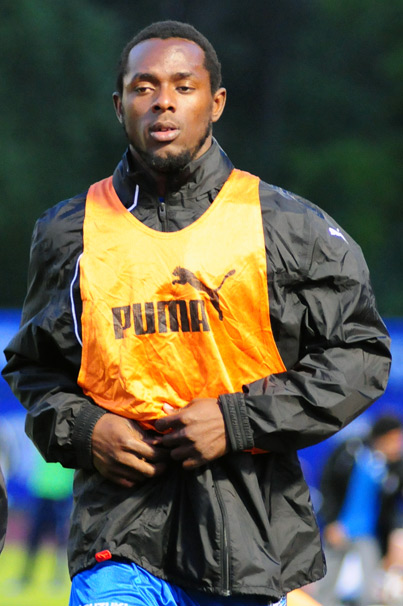
- Byers in training in May 2009

Personal information
- Full name: Peter Junior Byers
- Date of birth: 20 October 1984 (age 42)
- Place of birth: Freeman Village, Antigua and Barbuda
- Position: Forward

Team information
- Current team: SAP

Senior career*
Years	Team	Apps	(Gls)
2003–2007	SAP	79	(73)
2007–2008	San Juan Jabloteh	38	(21)
2008–2010	Montreal Impact	39	(9)
2009	→Trois-Rivières Attak (loan)	2	(1)
2010–2011	Parham		
2011	Antigua Barracuda FC	7	(4)
2011–2012	Los Angeles Blues	9	(3)
2012–2013	Antigua Barracuda FC	15	(3)
2013–2014	Central FC	7	(8)
2014–2015	SAP		
2015	Club Barcelona Atlético		
2016–	SAP		

International career^{‡}
2004–	Antigua and Barbuda	93	(44)
- * Club domestic league appearances and goals as of 18:53, 28 June 2018 (UTC) ‡ National team caps and goals as of 8 June 2022

Peter Byers (born 20 October 1984) is an Antiguan footballer who plays professionally for SAP FC and the Antigua and Barbuda national team as a striker.

== Club career ==
Born in Bolans, Byers spent his early career in his native Antigua and Barbuda with SAP, and in Trinidad and Tobago with San Juan Jabloteh.

Byers joined Montreal Impact of the USL First Division on 27 August 2008, a week before the roster freeze date. He was invited to trial with the San Jose Earthquakes during the 2009 MLS pre-season, but signed a new two-year deal with the Impact on 18 February 2009, after failing to agree a contract with the Earthquakes. In the 2009 season he was briefly loaned to Trois-Rivières Attak in the Canadian Soccer League, where he appeared in 2 matches and scored 1 goal. During the 2009 USL season playoffs, Byers scored the opening goal for the Impact in a 2–1 victory over the Puerto Rico Islanders, which allowed the Impact to advance to the finals. Their opponents in the finals were the Vancouver Whitecaps, and on 10 October 2009, in the first match of the finals, Byers scored the second goal in 3–2 victory.

On 3 August 2010, Byers was suspended for breaching a team rule. A week after his suspension was issued, the Montreal Impact announced the release of Byers from his contract for breaching club policy.

Byers returned home to Antigua to join Parham in the Antigua and Barbuda Premier Division, before having a brief stint with the Antigua Barracuda FC in the USL Professional Division, during which he scored four goals in seven games. Byers transferred to the Los Angeles Blues on 3 June 2011. Byers had a trial with V-league defending champions Sông Lam Nghệ An F.C. but was ultimately not offered a contract and returned to the Barracudas.

Following the 2012 USL Pro season, Byers signed for Central FC of the TT Pro League.

== International career ==
Byers made his debut for Antigua and Barbuda in 2004, and has played for them in 93 matches, scoring 44 goals.

=== International goals ===
Scores and results list Antigua and Barbuda's goal tally first.

No.	Date	Venue	Opponent	Score	Result	Competition
1.	12 January 2005	Antigua Recreation Ground, St. John's, Antigua and Barbuda	Trinidad and Tobago	1–0	2–1	Friendly
2.	6 February 2005	Barbados National Stadium, Bridgetown, Barbados	Barbados	2–3	2–3	Friendly
3.	26 February 2006	Bourda, Georgetown, Guyana	Guyana	1–4	1–4	Friendly
4.	3 September 2006	Antigua Recreation Ground, St. John's, Antigua and Barbuda	Dominica	1–0	1–0	Friendly
5.	20 September 2006	Antigua Recreation Ground, St. John's, Antigua and Barbuda	Anguilla	1–0	5–3	Friendly
6.	20 September 2006	Antigua Recreation Ground, St. John's, Antigua and Barbuda	Anguilla	2–1	5–3	Friendly
7.	20 September 2006	Antigua Recreation Ground, St. John's, Antigua and Barbuda	Anguilla	4–2	5–3	Friendly
8.	22 September 2006	Antigua Recreation Ground, St. John's, Antigua and Barbuda	Barbados	1–0	1–3	2007 Caribbean Cup qualification
9.	5 November 2006	Arnos Vale Stadium, Kingstown, Saint Vincent and the Grenadines	Saint Vincent and the Grenadines	1–1	2–2	2006 Independence Cup
10.	5 November 2006	Arnos Vale Stadium, Kingstown, Saint Vincent and the Grenadines	Saint Vincent and the Grenadines	2–2	2–2	2006 Independence Cup
11.	1 December 2007	Antigua Recreation Ground, St. John's	Saint Kitts and Nevis	1–0	2–0	Friendly
12.	1 December 2007	Antigua Recreation Ground, St. John's	Saint Kitts and Nevis	2–0	2–0	Friendly
13.	13 January 2008	Carlton Club Ground, Black Rock	Barbados	1–0	2–3	Friendly
14.	13 January 2008	Carlton Club Ground, Black Rock	Barbados	2–1	2–3	Friendly
15.	5 November 2008	Marvin Lee Stadium, Tunapuna, Trinidad and Tobago	Trinidad and Tobago	1–0	2–3	2008 Caribbean Championship qualification
16.	9 November 2008	Marvin Lee Stadium, Tunapuna, Trinidad and Tobago	Saint Kitts and Nevis	1–0	4–3	2008 Caribbean Championship qualification
17.	9 November 2008	Marvin Lee Stadium, Tunapuna, Trinidad and Tobago	Saint Kitts and Nevis	2–0	4–3	2008 Caribbean Championship qualification
18.	4 December 2008	Jarrett Park, Montego Bay, Jamaica	Haiti	1–1	1–1	2008 Caribbean Championship
19.	8 December 2008	Jarrett Park, Montego Bay, Jamaica	Guadeloupe	1–1	2–2	2008 Caribbean Championship
20.	8 December 2008	Jarrett Park, Montego Bay, Jamaica	Guadeloupe	2–2	2–2	2008 Caribbean Championship
21.	23 September 2010	Antigua Recreation Ground, St. John's	Saint Lucia	3–0	5–0	Friendly
22.	23 September 2010	Antigua Recreation Ground, St. John's	Saint Lucia	5–0	5–0	Friendly
23.	2 September 2011	Sir Vivian Richards Stadium, North Sound, Antigua and Barbuda	Curaçao	4–2	5–2	2014 FIFA World Cup qualification
24.	2 September 2011	Sir Vivian Richards Stadium, North Sound, Antigua and Barbuda	Curaçao	5–2	5–2	2014 FIFA World Cup qualification
25.	6 September 2011	Paul E. Joseph Stadium, Frederiksted, U.S. Virgin Islands	U.S. Virgin Islands	2–0	8–1	2014 FIFA World Cup qualification
26.	6 September 2011	Paul E. Joseph Stadium, Frederiksted, U.S. Virgin Islands	U.S. Virgin Islands	4–1	8–1	2014 FIFA World Cup qualification
27.	6 September 2011	Paul E. Joseph Stadium, Frederiksted, U.S. Virgin Islands	U.S. Virgin Islands	6–1	8–1	2014 FIFA World Cup qualification
28.	2 October 2011	Stanford Cricket Ground, Osbourn, Antigua and Barbuda	Martinique	1–2	1–2	Friendly
29.	11 October 2011	Sir Vivian Richards Stadium, North Sound, Antigua and Barbuda	U.S. Virgin Islands	2–0	10–0	2014 FIFA World Cup qualification
30.	11 October 2011	Sir Vivian Richards Stadium, North Sound, Antigua and Barbuda	U.S. Virgin Islands	3–0	10–0	2014 FIFA World Cup qualification
31.	11 October 2011	Sir Vivian Richards Stadium, North Sound, Antigua and Barbuda	U.S. Virgin Islands	4–0	10–0	2014 FIFA World Cup qualification
32.	1 April 2012	Arnos Vale Stadium, Kingstown, Saint Vincent and the Grenadines	Saint Vincent and the Grenadines	2–1	2–1	Friendly
33.	8 June 2012	Raymond James Stadium, Tampa, United States	United States	1–2	1–3	2014 FIFA World Cup qualification
34.	7 September 2012	Estadio Mateo Flores, Guatemala City, Guatemala	Guatemala	1–0	1–3	2014 FIFA World Cup qualification
35.	7 December 2012	Antigua Recreation Ground, St. John's, Antigua and Barbuda	Dominican Republic	1–0	1–2	2012 Caribbean Cup
36.	9 December 2012	Antigua Recreation Ground, St. John's, Antigua and Barbuda	Trinidad and Tobago	2–0	2–0	2012 Caribbean Cup
37.	3 September 2014	Antigua Recreation Ground, St. John's, Antigua and Barbuda	Anguilla	4–0	6–0	2014 Caribbean Cup qualification
38.	5 September 2014	Antigua Recreation Ground, St. John's, Antigua and Barbuda	Dominican Republic	1–0	2–1	2014 Caribbean Cup qualification
39.	12 November 2014	Montego Bay Sports Complex, Montego Bay, Jamaica	Haiti	2–2	2–2	2014 Caribbean Cup
40.	7 June 2016	Sir Vivian Richards Stadium, North Sound, Antigua and Barbuda	Grenada	1–0	5–1	2017 Caribbean Cup qualification
41.	8 October 2016	Antigua Recreation Ground, St. John's, Antigua and Barbuda	Puerto Rico	1–0	2–0	2017 Caribbean Cup qualification
42.	25 March 2018	Sabina Park, Kingston, Jamaica	Jamaica	1–1	1–1	Friendly
43.	12 October 2018	Thomas Robinson Stadium, Nassau, Bahamas	Bahamas	2–0	6–0	2019–20 CONCACAF Nations League qualification
44.	27 March 2021	Bethlehem Soccer Stadium, Upper Bethlehem, U.S. Virgin Islands	U.S. Virgin Islands	1–0	3–0	2022 FIFA World Cup qualification
