= Ranjae Christian =

Antiguan footballer (born 1977)

Personal information
- Full name: Ranjae Christian
- Date of birth: December 18, 1977 (age 48)
- Place of birth: Antigua and Barbuda
- Position: Defender

Team information
- Current team: Antigua Barracuda FC
- Number: 2

Senior career*
Years	Team	Apps	(Gls)
2000	Joe Public		
2002–2011	Bassa SC		
2011–2012	Antigua Barracuda FC	34	(5)

International career^{‡}
2000–	Antigua and Barbuda	43	(3)
- * Club domestic league appearances and goals as of August 20, 2012 ‡ National team caps and goals as of June 18, 2012

Ranjae Christian (born December 18, 1977) is an Antiguan footballer who currently plays for Antigua Barracuda FC in the USL Professional Division and the Antigua and Barbuda national team.

== Club career ==
Christian began his career in 2000 with Trinidadian team Joe Public, before moving home to play for Bassa SC in 2002. Christian played for Bassa in the Antigua and Barbuda Premier Division for nearly a decade, and while playing with Bassa he won five league titles (in 2004, 2005, 2007, 2008, and 2010), two Antigua and Barbuda FA Cup titles in 2008 and 2010, and was the league's top scorer in 2007 with 15 goals. He has also won 1 MVP trophy for the Antigua and Barbuda Premier division in 2007. He also played in the CFU Club Championship on three occasions, reaching the quarter finals of the competition in both 2005 and 2007.

In 2011, Christian transferred to the new Antigua Barracuda FC team prior to its first season in the USL Professional Division. He made his debut for the Barracudas on April 27, 2011, in a 7–0 victory over Puerto Rico United, scoring his team's 7th goal in the 78th minute of the game.

== International career ==
Christian made his debut for the Antigua and Barbuda national team in 2000. He represented his country in qualification for the 2002, 2006 and 2010 FIFA World Cups, and was part of the Antigua squad which took part in the final stages of the 2010 Caribbean Championship.

=== National team statistics ===
Antigua and Barbuda national team
Year	Apps	Goals
2000	4	0
2001	0	0
2002	2	0
2003	3	0
2004	2	0
2005	1	0
2006	3	0
2007	0	0
2008	8	2
2009	1	0
2010	1	0
Total		

=== International goals ===
Scores and results list Antigua and Barbuda's goal tally first.

Goal	Date	Venue	Opponent	Score	Result	Competition
1.	30 August 2008	Truman Bodden Sports Complex, George Town, Cayman Islands	Cayman Islands	1–0	1–1	2008 Caribbean Cup qualification
2.	7 November 2008	Marvin Lee Stadium, Macoya, Trinidad and Tobago	Guyana	2–1	2–1	2008 Caribbean Cup qualification
3.	6 September 2011	Paul E. Joseph Stadium, Frederiksted, United States Virgin Islands	U.S. Virgin Islands	1–0	8–1	2014 FIFA World Cup qualification
