= Jim Thomas (poet) =

American poet and professor

- Occupation: Poet

Jim Thomas (1930–February 2009) was an American poet, and professor at Truman State University, from 1964 to 1994.

He served in the United States Army in the Korean War, retiring as a lieutenant colonel in the National Guard.

== Works ==
- ""Hard Times: A Rock Poem"". Minnesota Review (28). 1987.
- Seed Time, Harvest Time, Thomas Jefferson University Press, 1990, ISBN 978-0-943549-10-1
- Brief Tracks, Truman State University Press, 2009, ISBN 978-1-935503-01-9
