= Peter Germain =

Haitian footballer (born 1982)

Personal information
- Date of birth: 22 January 1982 (age 44)
- Place of birth: Saint-Marc, Haiti
- Position: Midfielder

Team information
- Current team: Baltimore SC

Senior career*
Years	Team	Apps	(Gls)
2001–present	Baltimore SC		

International career
2001–2012	Haiti	65	(4)
- * Club domestic league appearances and goals

Peter Germain (born 22 January 1982) is a Haitian footballer who plays as a midfielder for Baltimore SC.

== Club career ==
Germain has so far been with Baltimore SC his entire career.

== International career ==
Germain made his debut for Haiti in a May 2001 Caribbean Cup match against St Kitts. He was a Haiti squad member at the 2002 and 2007 Gold Cup Finals and he played in 1 World Cup qualification match in 2004.

== Honours ==
Haiti

- Caribbean Nations Cup: 2007
