= Kelly Frederick =

Antigua and Barbudan footballer

Personal information
- Full name: Kelly Roberto Rafique Frederick
- Date of birth: October 7, 1978 (age 48)
- Place of birth: Greenbay, Antigua and Barbuda
- Height: 1.83 m (6 ft 0 in)
- Position: Forward

College career
Years	Team	Apps	(Gls)
1999–2000	Bryant & Stratton Bobcats		
2001–2002	UNLV Rebels		

Senior career*
Years	Team	Apps	(Gls)
1996	União Coimbra	1	(1)
2003–2016	Hoppers		

International career
1996–2009	Antigua and Barbuda	11	(7)
- * Club domestic league appearances and goals

Kelly Roberto Rafique Frederick (born October 7, 1978) is an Antigua and Barbudan former football player.

== Career statistics ==
=== Club ===
Club	Season	League			Cup		Other		Total	
Club	Season	Division	Apps	Goals	Apps	Goals	Apps	Goals	Apps	Goals
União Coimbra	1996–97	Segunda Divisão B	1	1	0	0	0	0	1	1
Career total			1	1	0	0	0	0	1	1

=== International ===
National team	Year	Apps	Goals
Antigua and Barbuda national team	1996	1	0
Antigua and Barbuda national team	2000	2	0
Antigua and Barbuda national team	2001	1	2
Antigua and Barbuda national team	2002	1	1
Antigua and Barbuda national team	2004	5	3
Antigua and Barbuda national team	2009	1	1
Total		11	7

=== International goals ===
Scores and results list Antigua and Barbuda's goal tally first.

No	Date	Venue	Opponent	Score	Result	Competition
1.	3 March 2001	Antigua Recreation Ground, St. John's, Antigua and Barbuda	Dominican Republic	1–1	2–3	2002 CONCACAF Gold Cup qualification
2.	3 March 2001	Antigua Recreation Ground, St. John's, Antigua and Barbuda	Dominican Republic	2–2	2–3	2002 CONCACAF Gold Cup qualification
3.	13 January 2002	Antigua Recreation Ground, St. John's, Antigua and Barbuda	Dominica	?–0	4–0	Friendly
4.	21 March 2004	Warner Park Sporting Complex, Basseterre, Saint Kitts and Nevis	Saint Kitts and Nevis	?–?	2–3	Friendly
5.	21 March 2004	Warner Park Sporting Complex, Basseterre, Saint Kitts and Nevis	Saint Kitts and Nevis	?–?	2–3	Friendly
6.	2 November 2004	Warner Park Sporting Complex, Basseterre, Saint Kitts and Nevis	Montserrat	3–2	4–5	2005 CONCACAF Gold Cup qualification
7.	3 June 2009	André Kamperveen Stadion, Paramaribo, Suriname	Guyana	1–1	2–1	Friendly
