= Tamorley Thomas =

Antiguan footballer (born 1983)

Personal information
- Full name: Tamorley Thomas
- Date of birth: 28 July 1983 (age 43)
- Place of birth: St. John's, Antigua and Barbuda
- Height: 1.76 m (5 ft 9 in)
- Position: Midfielder

Senior career*
Years	Team	Apps	(Gls)
2002–2011	Hoppers	35	(12)
2011–2013	Antigua Barracuda FC	44	(4)
2014–	Hoppers		

International career^{‡}
2002–	Antigua and Barbuda	64	(11)
- * Club domestic league appearances and goals as of 20 August 2012 ‡ National team caps and goals as of 14:55, 24 February 2017 (UTC)

Tamorley "Ziggy" Thomas (born 28 July 1983) is an Antiguan footballer who formerly played for Antigua Barracuda FC in the USL Professional Division.

== Club career ==
Thomas played club football for Hoppers in the Antigua and Barbuda Premier Division from 2002 to 2010. He won the CTV Warriors' Cup with the Hoppers in 2005, and played in the CFU Club Championship in 2005 and 2006/07.

On April 8, 2011, Thomas signed with Antigua Barracuda FC in the USL Professional Division. He made his debut for the Barracudas on April 17, 2011, in the team's first competitive game, a 2–1 loss to the Los Angeles Blues, and had the honor of scoring his team's first ever competitive goal.

== International career ==
Nicknamed Ziggy, Thomas made his debut for Antigua and Barbuda on November 11, 2002, in CONCACAF Gold Cup qualification match against Haiti and has earned 15 caps since. He played in 7 World Cup qualification games.

=== National team statistics ===
As of match played on 11 November 2016.

Antigua and Barbuda national team
Year	Apps	Goals
2002	1	0
2003	1	0
2004	5	1
2005	1	0
2006	8	2
2007	0	0
2008	0	0
2009	0	0
2010	3	0
2011	10	6
2012	9	0
2013	0	0
2014	9	0
2015	6	2
2016	5	0
Total	58	11

=== International goals ===
Scores and results list Antigua and Barbuda's goal tally first.

No	Date	Venue	Opponent	Score	Result	Competition
1.	2 November 2004	Warner Park Sporting Complex, Basseterre, Saint Kitts and Nevis	Montserrat	4–4	5–4	2005 Caribbean Cup qualification
2.	27 August 2006	Antigua Recreation Ground, St. John's, Antigua and Barbuda	Saint Vincent and the Grenadines	1–0	1–0	Friendly
3.	20 September 2006	Antigua Recreation Ground, St. John's, Antigua and Barbuda	Anguilla	3–1	5–3	2007 Caribbean Cup qualification
4.	2 September 2011	Sir Vivian Richards Stadium, North Sound, Antigua and Barbuda	Curaçao	3–1	5–2	2014 FIFA World Cup qualification
5.	7 October 2011	Ergilio Hato Stadium, Willemstad, Curaçao	Curaçao	1–0	1–0	2014 FIFA World Cup qualification
6.	11 October 2011	Sir Vivian Richards Stadium, North Sound, Antigua and Barbuda	U.S. Virgin Islands	1–0	10–0	2014 FIFA World Cup qualification
7.	11 October 2011	Sir Vivian Richards Stadium, North Sound, Antigua and Barbuda	U.S. Virgin Islands	5–0	10–0	2014 FIFA World Cup qualification
8.	11 October 2011	Sir Vivian Richards Stadium, North Sound, Antigua and Barbuda	U.S. Virgin Islands	8–0	10–0	2014 FIFA World Cup qualification
9.	15 November 2011	Stade Sylvio Cator, Port-au-Prince, Haiti	Haiti	1–0	1–2	2014 FIFA World Cup qualification
10.	8 March 2015	Antigua Recreation Ground, St. John's, Antigua and Barbuda	U.S. Virgin Islands	2–0	2–0	Friendly
11.	15 March 2015	Antigua Recreation Ground, St. John's, Antigua and Barbuda	Dominica	1–0	1–0	Friendly
