= Jamie Thomas (footballer, born 1985) =

Antigua and Barbudan footballer

Personal information
- Date of birth: 21 October 1985 (age 41)
- Position: Midfielder

Team information
- Current team: Bassa Sports Club

Senior career*
Years	Team	Apps	(Gls)
- Bassa Sports Club

International career^{‡}
2006–	Antigua and Barbuda	26	(10)
- * Club domestic league appearances and goals ‡ National team caps and goals as of 08:23, 18 March 2012 (UTC)

Jamie Thomas (born 21 October 1985) is an Antiguan international footballer who plays club football for Bassa Sports Club as a midfielder.

== Career ==
Valcin has played club football for Bassa Sports Club since 2003/04

He made his international debut for Antigua and Barbuda in 2006, and has appeared in FIFA World Cup qualifying matches.

=== International goals ===
Scores and results list Antigua and Barbuda's goal tally first.

Goal	Date	Venue	Opponent	Score	Result	Competition
1.	20 September 2006	Antigua Recreation Ground, St. John's, Antigua and Barbuda	Anguilla	5–3	5–3	2007 Caribbean Cup qualification
2.	27 August 2008	Truman Bodden Sports Complex, George Town, Cayman Islands	Bermuda	1–0	4–0	2008 Caribbean Cup qualification
3.	27 August 2008	Truman Bodden Sports Complex, George Town, Cayman Islands	Bermuda	2–0	4–0	2008 Caribbean Cup qualification
4.	31 August 2008	Truman Bodden Sports Complex, George Town, Cayman Islands	Saint Martin	1–0	3–2	2008 Caribbean Cup qualification
5.	31 August 2008	Truman Bodden Sports Complex, George Town, Cayman Islands	Saint Martin	2–2	3–2	2008 Caribbean Cup qualification
6.	9 November 2008	Marvin Lee Stadium, Macoya, Trinidad and Tobago	Saint Kitts and Nevis	3–1	4–3	2008 Caribbean Cup qualification
7.	9 November 2008	Marvin Lee Stadium, Macoya, Trinidad and Tobago	Saint Kitts and Nevis	4–2	4–3	2008 Caribbean Cup qualification
8.	23 September 2010	Antigua Recreation Ground, St. John's, Antigua and Barbuda	Saint Lucia	5–0	5–0	Friendly
9.	28 August 2011	Antigua Recreation Ground, St. John's, Antigua and Barbuda	Saint Vincent and the Grenadines	2–2	2–2	Friendly
10.	11 October 2011	Sir Vivian Richards Stadium, North Sound, Antigua and Barbuda	U.S. Virgin Islands	2–2	2–2	2014 FIFA World Cup qualification
