= Bassa S.C. =

Association football club in Antigua and Barbuda

- Full name: Bassa Sports Club
- Founded: 1999
- Ground: All Saints, Antigua
- Manager: Danny Smith
- League: Antigua and Barbuda Premier Division
- 2013–14: 5th

Bassa Sports Club is an Antiguan professional football club that competes in the local top division. They have won the premier league many times. It is based in All Saints.

== History ==
The club was founded in 1999. Bassa have clinched the Antiguan league title five times. They took part in the CFU Club Championship in 2004, 2005 and 2007 in an attempt to qualify for the CONCACAF Champions' Cup.

== Honours ==
- Antigua and Barbuda Premier Division: 5

2003-04, 2004–05, 2006–07, 2007–08, 2009–10

- Antigua and Barbuda FA Cup: 2

2007-08, 2009–10

== Performance in CONCACAF competitions ==
- CFU Club Championship: 3 appearances

2004 – First Round — Lost against (Jamaica) Tivoli Gardens 4 – 2 on aggregate
2005 – Quarter-Finals — Lost against (Netherlands Antilles) Centro Social Deportivo Barber 7 – 3 on aggregate
2007 – Quarter-Finals — Lost against (Trinidad and Tobago) Joe Public F.C. 4 – 0

== Current squad ==
Nationality given from place of birth

Note: Flags indicate national team as defined under FIFA eligibility rules; some limited exceptions apply. Players may hold more than one non-FIFA nationality.

No.	Pos.	Nation	Player
4	DF	ATG	Troy Dublin
9	MF	ATG	Romario Braithwaite
11	FW	ATG	Jamie Thomas
14	MF	ATG	Keiron Richards

No.	Pos.	Nation	Player
16	MF	JAM	Gary Barnes
17	MF	ATG	Brian Edwards
19	MF	ATG	Lennox Julian
22	DF	ATG	Hazely Pyle
