= Antigua Barracuda FC =

Former association football club in Antigua and Barbuda

- Full name: Antigua Barracuda Football Club
- Nickname: 'Cudas
- Founded: 25 May 2010
- Dissolved: 6 January 2014
- Ground: Stanford Cricket Ground
- Capacity: 5,000
- Owner: Gordon Derrick
- League: USL Pro
Home colours	Away colours

Antigua Barracuda was an Antiguan professional football team based in St. John's, Antigua and Barbuda. Founded in 2010, the team played in USL Pro, the third tier of the United States soccer league system from 2011 to 2013.

The team played its home games at Stanford Cricket Ground (colloquially known as "Sticky Wicket Stadium") in Osbourn, Saint George Parish until the 2013 season when they became a travelling team. The team's colours were sky blue, white and black.

== History ==
The team was formed with support from the Antigua and Barbuda Football Association to develop and retain local talent; it was the country's only professional team. They were originally set to join the USL First Division in 2011, but was later announced as being a founding member of USL Pro and its International Division after USL First and USL Second Division dissolved in 2010 to make way for the new league.

The club's first official match took place in April 2010, a friendly against the Puerto Rico Islanders. Approximately 1,000 people attended the event.

The club arranged two further friendlies with Montreal Impact, the first of which took place on 17 April 2010 at Sir Vivian Richards Stadium with the second scheduled to be held on 4 September at Saputo Stadium in Montreal. They also arranged exhibition matches against Jamaica's Tivoli Gardens and Harbour View for May. On August 20, 2010 Barracuda FC announced the cancellation of the friendly matches because of funding difficulties. Impact President Joey Saputo subsequently made an accusation of a serious lack of professionalism on the part of the Antiguan club.

On 23 September 2010, United Soccer Leagues formally announced that Antigua Barracuda FC would join the newly formed USL Pro in 2011 alongside Sevilla FC Puerto Rico and River Plate Puerto Rico as founding members of the league's tentatively named Caribbean Division, which was later officially unveiled as the International Division.

The team played its first competitive game on 17 April 2011, a 2–1 home loss to the Los Angeles Blues. The first competitive goal in franchise history was scored by Tamorley Thomas

The 2013 season saw the club lose each of their 26 games. This not only tied the North American professional sports record for the worst performance over a full season, but was also one of only six times an association football club managed to have a winless season. Antigua Barracuda were forced to play all of their matches in the United States after the Puerto Rican teams withdrew from USL Pro; the club's players and staff were relocated to Tampa, Florida, and had no permanent training facility. The club withdrew from the USL Pro on 6 January 2014, due in part to the lack of a home venue and the accompanying financial reasons.

== Stadium ==
- Stanford Cricket Ground; Saint George Parish, Antigua and Barbuda (2011–2012)

Barracuda played their home games at the Stanford Cricket Ground in the village of Osbourn in Saint George Parish in Antigua. The stadium was originally built to host the Stanford 20/20 cricket tournament in 2006, and was temporarily converted for soccer usage for Barracudas games. The stadium's nickname, "Sticky Wicket Stadium", came from the adjoining restaurant complex.

== Players and staff ==
=== Coaches ===
- (England) Tom Curtis, 2011 – 2012
- (Antigua and Barbuda) Fernando "Nando" Abraham, 2013
- (England) Adrian Whitbread, 2013

== Record ==
=== Year-by-year ===
Year	Division	League	Regular season	Playoffs	CFU Club Championship	Avg. attendance
2011	3	USL Pro	6th, American Division	did not qualify	did not qualify	1,189
2012	3	USL Pro	11th	did not qualify	4th	883
2013	3	USL Pro	13th	did not qualify	7th	N/A (Note: All games played on the road)
