= 2019–20 Curaçao Promé Divishon =

Curaçao Promé Divishon
- Season: 2019-20
- Relegated: Fortuna Kura Piedra
- Matches: 90
- Goals: 297 (3.3 per match)
- Top goalscorer: Randel Winklaar (18 goals)
- Biggest home win: Centro Dominguito 9–0 SUBT (11 January 2020)
- Biggest away win: Fortuna 0–9 Centro Dominguito (19 January 2020)
- Highest scoring: Centro Dominguito 9–0 SUBT (11 January 2020); Fortuna 0–9 Centro Dominguito (19 January 2020); Inter Willemstad 7–2 SUBT (13 July 2020)

The 2019–20 Curaçao Promé Divishon is the 94th season of the Curaçao Promé Divishon, the top division football competition in Curaçao. The season began on 10 November 2019. The season was postponed on 14 March due to the COVID-19 pandemic and returned on 29 June 2020.

== Regular season ==
Pos	Team	Pld	W	D	L	GF	GA	GD	Pts	Qualification or relegation
1	Jong Holland	18	12	6	0	38	11	+27	42	Advance to Kaya 6
2	Scherpenheuvel	18	10	4	4	39	14	+25	34	Advance to Kaya 6
3	CSD Barber	18	10	2	6	34	22	+12	32	Advance to Kaya 6
4	Inter Willemstad	18	8	6	4	44	29	+15	30	Advance to Kaya 6
5	Vesta	18	9	3	6	28	25	+3	30	Advance to Kaya 6
6	UNDEBA	18	8	3	7	26	33	−7	27	Advance to Kaya 6
7	Centro Dominguito	18	7	5	6	45	27	+18	26	
8	Victory Boys	18	3	3	12	16	34	−18	12	
9	SUBT	18	3	3	12	17	42	−25	12	
10	Fortuna Kura Piedra (R)	18	1	3	14	10	60	−50	6	Relegated to Curaçao Segundo Divishon

Source: Soccerway
(R) Relegated

== Kaya 6 ==
After the 18th round, in which every team has played the other nine, home and away, the top six teams advanced to the Kaya 6. Teams will play a round-robin for a total of five rounds, which will take place from 14 August to 12 September. The top four teams at the end of the Kaya 6 will advance to the Kaya 4.

Pos	Team	Pld	W	D	L	GF	GA	GD	Pts	Qualification or relegation
1	Jong Holland	5	5	0	0	15	6	+9	15	Advance to Kaya 4
2	Vesta	5	3	1	1	10	7	+3	10	Advance to Kaya 4
3	Inter Willemstad	5	2	1	2	9	7	+2	7	Advance to Kaya 4
4	Scherpenheuvel	5	2	1	2	8	8	0	7	Advance to Kaya 4
5	CSD Barber	5	1	0	4	5	9	−4	3	
6	UNDEBA	5	0	1	4	1	11	−10	1	

Source: Soccerway

== Kaya 4 ==
Following the Kaya 6, the top four teams advance to the Kaya 4 and will play a round-robin for a total of three rounds, taking place from 16 October to 28 October. The top two teams will advance to the championship final.

Pos	Team	Pld	W	D	L	GF	GA	GD	Pts	Qualification or relegation
1	Scherpenheuvel	3	2	0	1	3	3	0	6	Advance to Championship final
2	Vesta	3	1	2	0	3	0	+3	5	Advance to Championship final
3	Inter Willemstad	3	1	1	1	1	1	0	4	
4	Jong Holland	3	0	1	2	0	3	−3	1	

Source: Soccerway

== Championship final ==
8 November 2020
19:30

Scherpenheuvel	1–0 (a.e.t.)	Vesta

Ergilio Hato Stadion, Willemstad

== Clubs' stadiums ==
Team	Location	Stadium	Capacity
Centro Social Deportivo Barber	Willemstad	Ergilio Hato Stadium	10,000
CRKSV Jong Holland	Willemstad	Ergilio Hato Stadium	10,000
C.V.V. Inter Willemstad	Willemstad	Stadion dr. Antoine Maduro	7,000
RKSV Centro Dominguito	Willemstad	Ergilio Hato Stadium	10,000
RKSV Scherpenheuvel	Willemstad	Stadion dr. Antoine Maduro	7,000
Sport Unie Brion Trappers	Willemstad	Stadion dr. Antoine Maduro	7,000
SV Hubentut Fortuna	Willemstad	Ergilio Hato Stadium	10,000
S.V. Victory Boys	Willemstad	Ergilio Hato Stadium	10,000
S.V. Vesta	Willemstad	Stadion dr. Antoine Maduro	7,000
Union Deportivo Banda Abou	Willemstad	Stadion dr. Antoine Maduro	7,000
