= List of football clubs in Curaçao =

This is a list of football (soccer) clubs in Curaçao.

- Curacao Stars United
- Centro Social Deportivo Barber
- RKSV Centro Dominguito
- Hubentut Fortuna
- CRKSV Jong Colombia
- CRKSV Jong Holland
- S.V. S.U.B.T.
- Deportivo Santa Cruz
- RKV FC SITHOC
- UNDEBA
- S.V. VESTA
- S.V. Victory Boys
- CVV Willemstad
- C.V.C. Zebra's https://chat.whatsapp.com/CSpdcr8HEv70fsrkGn8D4I?s=cl&p=a&mlu=
