= 2016 Curaçao Sekshon Pagá =

Curaçao Sekshon Pagá
- Season: 2016

The 2016 Curaçao Sekshon Pagá was the 90th season of top-flight association football in Curaçao, and the 39th season of the competition being branded as the Sekshon Pagá. The regular season began on 17 April 2016 and ended on 6 September 2016. The playoffs began 8 September 2016 and ended with the final 6 November 2016. The defending champions, Centro Dominguito successfully defended their title against Scherpenheuvel.

== Regular season ==
Pos	Team	Pld	W	D	L	GF	GA	GD	Pts	Qualification or relegation
1	Centro Dominguito (C)	18	13	2	3	47	19	+28	41	Qualification to the Kaya 6
2	CSD Barber	18	11	3	4	55	28	+27	36	Qualification to the Kaya 6
3	Scherpenheuvel	18	9	6	3	34	19	+15	33	Qualification to the Kaya 6
4	Jong Holland	18	8	6	4	35	23	+12	30	Qualification to the Kaya 6
5	Undeba	18	7	6	5	29	27	+2	27	Qualification to the Kaya 6
6	Hubentut Fortuna	18	6	5	7	31	37	−6	23	Qualification to the Kaya 6
7	VESTA	18	6	2	10	26	38	−12	20	
8	Victory Boys	18	3	5	10	18	37	−19	14	
9	SUBT	18	1	8	9	17	36	−19	11	
10	Jong Colombia (R)	18	2	5	11	13	41	−28	11	Qualification to the Relegation playoff

Updated to match(es) played on 17 November 2016.
Source: https://www.rsssf.org/tablesc/curacao2016.html
(C) Champions;
(R) Relegated

== Kaya Tournament ==
=== Kaya 6 ===
Pos	Team	Pld	W	D	L	GF	GA	GD	Pts	Qualification or relegation
1	Jong Holland	5	4	0	1	13	4	+9	12	Qualification to the Kaya 4
2	Scherpenheuvel	5	3	1	1	8	4	+4	10	Qualification to the Kaya 4
3	Centro Dominguito (C)	5	3	0	2	12	7	+5	9	Qualification to the Kaya 4
4	CSD Barber	5	2	1	2	12	9	+3	7	Qualification to the Kaya 4
5	Hubentut Fortuna	5	1	0	4	8	15	−7	3	
6	Undeba	5	1	0	4	5	19	−14	3	

Updated to match(es) played on 17 November 2016.
Source: https://www.rsssf.org/tablesc/curacao2016.html
(C) Champions

=== Kaya 4 ===
Pos	Team	Pld	W	D	L	GF	GA	GD	Pts	Qualification or relegation
1	Scherpenheuvel	3	2	1	0	6	3	+3	7	Qualification to the Final
2	Centro Dominguito (C)	3	1	1	1	9	6	+3	4	Qualification to the Final
3	Jong Holland	3	1	0	2	2	7	−5	3	
4	CSD Barber	3	0	2	1	5	6	−1	2	

Updated to match(es) played on 17 November 2016.
Source: https://www.rsssf.org/tablesc/curacao2016.html
(C) Champions

=== Final ===
6 November 2016

Scherpenheuvel	1–2	Centro Dominguito
Guedez 35'		Isenia 32'; Winklaar 85'

Ergilio Hato Stadium, Willemstad
