= 2015 Curaçao Sekshon Pagá =

Curaçao Sekshon Pagá
- Season: 2015

Statistics from the 2015 Curaçao Sekshon Pagá:

== Table ==
=== Regular season ===
| Pos | Team | Pld | W | D | L | GF | GA | GD | Pts | Qualification or relegation |
|---|---|---|---|---|---|---|---|---|---|---|
| 1 | Centro Dominguito | 18 | 17 | 1 | 0 | 53 | 10 | +43 | 52 | Kaya 6 |
| 2 | Jong Holland | 18 | 11 | 4 | 3 | 30 | 18 | +12 | 37 | Kaya 6 |
| 3 | CSD Barber | 18 | 11 | 3 | 4 | 51 | 26 | +25 | 36 | Kaya 6 |
| 4 | Victory Boys | 18 | 10 | 3 | 5 | 32 | 18 | +14 | 33 | Kaya 6 |
| 5 | UNDEBA | 18 | 6 | 5 | 7 | 30 | 27 | +3 | 23 | Kaya 6 |
| 6 | Hubentut Fortuna | 18 | 6 | 4 | 8 | 27 | 28 | −1 | 22 | Kaya 6 |
| 7 | SUBT | 18 | 4 | 4 | 10 | 27 | 35 | −8 | 16 | |
| 8 | Scherpenheuvel | 18 | 1 | 9 | 8 | 13 | 27 | −14 | 12 | |
| 9 | Jong Colombia | 18 | 3 | 2 | 13 | 19 | 59 | −40 | 11 | |
| 10 | Sithoc | 18 | 2 | 3 | 13 | 15 | 49 | −34 | 9 | Relegation playoffs |

Updated to match(es) played on unknown. Source:

=== Kaya 6 ===
| Pos | Team | Pld | W | D | L | GF | GA | GD | Pts | Qualification |
|---|---|---|---|---|---|---|---|---|---|---|
| 1 | Centro Dominguito | 5 | 2 | 3 | 0 | 5 | 2 | +3 | 9 | Kaya 4 |
| 2 | CSD Barber | 5 | 2 | 2 | 1 | 11 | 7 | +4 | 8 | Kaya 4 |
| 3 | Victory Boys | 5 | 2 | 2 | 1 | 7 | 8 | −1 | 8 | Kaya 4 |
| 4 | Hubentut Fortuna | 5 | 1 | 3 | 1 | 8 | 7 | +1 | 6 | Kaya 4 |
| 5 | UNDEBA | 5 | 2 | 0 | 3 | 8 | 9 | −1 | 6 | |
| 6 | Jong Holland | 5 | 0 | 2 | 3 | 4 | 10 | −6 | 2 | |

Updated to match(es) played on unknown. Source:

=== Kaya 4 ===
| Pos | Team | Pld | W | D | L | GF | GA | GD | Pts | Qualification |
|---|---|---|---|---|---|---|---|---|---|---|
| 1 | Centro Dominguito | 3 | 1 | 2 | 0 | 8 | 6 | +2 | 5 | Championship match |
| 2 | CSD Barber | 3 | 1 | 2 | 0 | 6 | 4 | +2 | 5 | Championship match |
| 3 | Hubentut Fortuna | 3 | 1 | 1 | 1 | 5 | 5 | 0 | 4 | |
| 4 | Victory Boys | 3 | 0 | 1 | 2 | 5 | 9 | −4 | 1 | |

Updated to match(es) played on unknown. Source:

== Championship match ==
25 October 2015

| Centro Dominguito | 4-2 | Centro Barber |
|---|---|---|
| Norvianel Naar 30' 75'; Steward Sambo 39'; Lisandro Trenidad 90+' | | Jurensley Martina 4'; Gerion Alberto 67' |

Stadion Ergilio Hato, Willemstad

== See also ==
- Curaçao League First Division
