= 2017 Curaçao Sekshon Pagá =

Curaçao Sekshon Pagá
- Season: 2017
- Champions: RKSV Centro Dominguito

The 2017 Curaçao Sekshon Pagá was the 91st season of top-flight association football in Curaçao, and the 40th season of the competition being branded as the Sekshon Pagá. The season started on 5 February and concluded on 17 September 2017.

== Regular season ==
Pos	Team	Pld	W	D	L	GF	GA	GD	Pts	Qualification or relegation
1	Jong Holland	18	12	2	4	35	20	+15	38	Kaya 6
2	Vesta	18	10	4	4	33	23	+10	34	Kaya 6
3	CSD Barber	18	9	3	6	33	31	+2	30	Kaya 6
4	Centro Dominguito	18	8	4	6	33	26	+7	28	Kaya 6
5	Scherpenheuvel	18	6	6	6	17	17	0	24	Kaya 6
6	UNDEBA	18	5	7	6	30	28	+2	22	Kaya 6
7	Inter Willemstad	18	5	6	7	25	32	−7	21	
8	Victory Boys	18	4	6	8	26	34	−8	18	
9	Hubentut Fortuna	18	3	7	8	21	31	−10	16	
10	SUBT	18	4	3	11	19	30	−11	15	Relegation

Updated to match(es) played on unknown. Source:

== Kaya 6 ==
Pos	Team	Pld	W	D	L	GF	GA	GD	Pts	Qualification
1	Centro Dominguito	5	3	1	1	7	2	+5	10	Kaya 4
2	Scherpenheuvel	5	3	1	1	4	3	+1	10	Kaya 4
3	Jong Holland	5	2	2	1	7	6	+1	8	Kaya 4
4	CSD Barber	5	2	1	2	10	7	+3	7	Kaya 4
5	UNDEBA	5	1	1	3	4	11	−7	4	
6	Vesta	5	1	0	4	2	5	−3	3	

Updated to match(es) played on unknown. Source:

== Kaya 4 ==
Pos	Team	Pld	W	D	L	GF	GA	GD	Pts	Qualification
1	Centro Dominguito	3	2	1	0	7	4	+3	7	Final
2	Scherpenheuvel	3	1	2	0	4	2	+2	5	Final
3	Jong Holland	3	1	1	1	9	5	+4	4	
4	CSD Barber	3	0	0	3	2	11	−9	0	

Updated to match(es) played on unknown. Source:

== Final ==
17 September 2017

Centro Dominguito	2-0	Scherpenheuvel

Stadion dr. Antoine Maduro, Kintjan, Willemstad
