= 2010–11 Curaçao Sekshon Pagá =

Curaçao League
- Season: 2010–11
- Champions: Hubentut Fortuna
- Relegated: CRKSV Jong Colombia
- CFU Club Championship: Hubentut Fortuna; Centro Barber

The 2010–11 Curaçao League (Sekshon Pagá) is the 2010–11 season of the Curaçao League.

== Regular season ==
Pos	Team	Pld	W	D	L	GF	GA	GD	Pts	Qualification or relegation
1	RKSV Centro Dominguito	18	12	3	3	37	16	+21	39	Qualified for Top Six Playoff
2	CRKSV Jong Holland	18	10	4	4	26	19	+7	34	Qualified for Top Six Playoff
3	S.V. Hubentut Fortuna	18	9	6	3	36	22	+14	33	Qualified for Top Six Playoff
4	C.S.D. Barber	18	8	5	5	28	18	+10	29	Qualified for Top Six Playoff
5	RKVFC Sithoc	18	6	6	6	28	24	+4	24	Qualified for Top Six Playoff
6	S.V. VESTA	18	5	8	5	17	19	−2	23	Qualified for Top Six Playoff
7	S.V. Victory Boys	18	5	4	9	22	35	−13	19	
8	S.V. SUBT	18	4	6	8	25	30	−5	18	
9	UNDEBA	18	2	6	10	14	28	−14	12	
10	CRKSV Jong Colombia	18	2	6	10	13	35	−22	12	Relegated

== Top Six Playoff ==
Pos	Team	Pld	W	D	L	GF	GA	GD	Pts	Qualification or relegation
1	S.V. Hubentut Fortuna	5	3	0	2	11	6	+5	9	Qualified for Top Four Playoff
2	CRKSV Jong Holland	5	3	0	2	5	4	+1	9	Qualified for Top Four Playoff
3	RKVFC Sithoc	5	2	2	1	8	8	0	8	Qualified for Top Four Playoff
4	C.S.D. Barber	5	2	2	1	4	4	0	8	Qualified for Top Four Playoff
5	S.V. VESTA	5	2	0	3	5	7	−2	6	
6	RKSV Centro Dominguito	5	0	2	3	5	9	−4	2	

== Top Four Playoff ==
Pos	Team	Pld	W	D	L	GF	GA	GD	Pts	Qualification or relegation
1	C.S.D. Barber	3	2	1	0	6	2	+4	7	Qualified for Final and 2012 CFU Club Championship
2	S.V. Hubentut Fortuna	3	2	0	1	5	4	+1	6	Qualified for Final and 2012 CFU Club Championship
3	CRKSV Jong Holland	3	0	2	1	2	3	−1	2	
3	RKVFC Sithoc	3	0	1	2	3	7	−4	1	

== Final ==
June 26, 2011

C.S.D. Barber	2–2 (a.e.t.)	S.V. Hubentut Fortuna
Penalties
	6–7

Match annulled and replayed due to Fortuna using an ineligible player as substitute and an incorrectly executed doping test; Fortuna 3 points deducted.

Replay:

September 28, 2011

C.S.D. Barber	0–1	S.V. Hubentut Fortuna
