= 2017–18 Curaçao Promé Divishon =

Curaçao Sekshon Pagá
- Season: 2017–18
- Champions: Jong Holland
- Caribbean Club Shield: Jong Holland

The 2017–18 Curaçao Sekshon Pagá is the 92nd season of top-flight association football in Curaçao, and the 41st season of the competition being branded as the Sekshon Pagá. The regular season started on 5 November 2017, and the final was played on 8 July 2018.

== Regular season ==
Pos	Team	Pld	W	D	L	GF	GA	GD	Pts	Qualification or relegation
1	Jong Holland	18	11	5	2	36	11	+25	38	Kaya 6
2	Vesta	18	8	6	4	31	24	+7	30	Kaya 6
3	Centro Dominguito	18	7	7	4	19	20	−1	28	Kaya 6
4	UNDEBA	18	7	6	5	29	23	+6	27	Kaya 6
5	Scherpenheuvel	18	7	6	5	18	14	+4	27	Kaya 6
6	Inter Willemstad	18	7	5	6	22	20	+2	26	Kaya 6
7	Victory Boys	18	7	5	6	21	24	−3	26	
8	CSD Barber	18	5	3	10	22	24	−2	18	
9	Jong Colombia	18	4	4	10	16	27	−11	16	
10	Hubentut Fortuna	18	3	1	14	16	43	−27	10	Relegation

Updated to match(es) played on unknown. Source:

== Kaya 6 ==
Pos	Team	Pld	W	D	L	GF	GA	GD	Pts	Qualification
1	Jong Holland	5	3	1	1	8	5	+3	10	Kaya 4
2	Vesta	5	3	1	1	7	5	+2	10	Kaya 4
3	Scherpenheuvel	5	2	2	1	4	2	+2	8	Kaya 4
4	UNDEBA	5	2	0	3	9	6	+3	6	Kaya 4
5	Centro Dominguito	5	2	0	3	6	7	−1	6	
6	Inter Willemstad	5	1	0	4	3	12	−9	3	

Updated to match(es) played on unknown. Source:

== Kaya 4 ==
Pos	Team	Pld	W	D	L	GF	GA	GD	Pts	Qualification
1	Jong Holland	3	2	1	0	5	3	+2	7	Final
2	Vesta	3	2	0	1	4	3	+1	6	Final
3	Scherpenheuvel	3	1	1	1	7	4	+3	4	
4	UNDEBA	3	0	0	3	2	8	−6	0	

Updated to match(es) played on unknown. Source:

== Final ==
8 July 2018

Jong Holland	1-0	VESTA

Stadion Ergilio Hato, Willemstad
