= 2018–19 Curaçao Promé Divishon =

Curaçao Promé Divishon
- Season: 2018–19
- Champions: SV VESTA

The 2018–19 Curaçao Promé Divishon is the 93rd season of the Curaçao Promé Divishon, the top division football competition in Curaçao. The season began on 28 October 2018.

== Regular season ==
Pos	Team	Pld	W	D	L	GF	GA	GD	Pts	Qualification or relegation
1	Scherpenheuvel (A)	18	13	2	3	34	12	+22	41	Advance to Kaya 6
2	Centro Dominguito (A)	18	10	5	3	26	19	+7	35	Advance to Kaya 6
3	Jong Holland (A)	18	9	3	6	28	24	+4	30	Advance to Kaya 6
4	UNDEBA (A)	18	7	6	5	33	24	+9	27	Advance to Kaya 6
5	CSD Barber (A)	18	7	4	7	33	27	+6	25	Advance to Kaya 6
6	Vesta (A)	18	7	4	7	29	26	+3	25	Advance to Kaya 6
7	Inter Willemstad	18	6	5	7	23	21	+2	23	
8	Victory Boys	18	4	7	7	15	22	−7	19	
9	SUBT	18	5	3	10	22	30	−8	18	
10	Jong Colombia (R)	18	1	3	14	14	52	−38	6	Relegated to Curaçao Segundo Divishon

Source: Soccerway
(A) Advance to a further round; (R) Relegated

== Kaya 6 ==
Pos	Team	Pld	W	D	L	GF	GA	GD	Pts	Qualification or relegation
1	Scherpenheuvel (A)	5	3	2	0	7	2	+5	11	Advance to Kaya 4
2	Vesta (A)	5	3	1	1	9	4	+5	10	Advance to Kaya 4
3	CSD Barber (A)	5	2	3	0	6	3	+3	9	Advance to Kaya 4
4	Jong Holland (A)	5	2	1	2	5	3	+2	7	Advance to Kaya 4
5	Centro Dominguito	5	1	1	3	3	6	−3	4	
6	UNDEBA	5	0	0	5	2	14	−12	0	

Source: Soccerway
(A) Advance to a further round

== Kaya 4 ==
Pos	Team	Pld	W	D	L	GF	GA	GD	Pts	Qualification or relegation
1	Scherpenheuvel (A)	3	2	1	0	8	2	+6	7	Advance to Championship final
2	Vesta (A)	3	1	2	0	4	2	+2	5	Advance to Championship final
3	CSD Barber	3	1	1	1	5	5	0	4	
4	Jong Holland	3	0	0	3	2	10	−8	0	

Source: Soccerway
(A) Advance to a further round

== Championship final ==
11 August 2019

Scherpenheuvel	0-0 (a.e.t.)	Vesta
	Report
Penalties
	1-3

Ergilio Hato Stadion, Willemstad
Referee: Arthur Gosepa
