= Curaçao national under-20 football team =

Curaçao
- Association: FFK
- Head coach: Dean Gorré
- Home stadium: Stadion Ergilio Hato
- FIFA code: CUW
First colours	Second colours

FIFA ranking
- Current: 174 ▲7
- Highest: 146 (March 2011)
- Lowest: 183 (April 2013)

The Curaçao national under-20 football team is the official football team under 20 of Curaçao, under the control of the Curaçao Football Federation.

== List of Coaches ==
- (Curaçao) (Netherlands Antilles) Henry Caldera (2012), (2014–2018)
- (Netherlands) Hans Schrijver (2012–2013)
- (Curaçao) Ludwig Alberto (2018–2019)
- (Cuba) Raúl González (2020)
- (Curaçao) (Netherlands) Gersinio Constansia (2021–2022)
- ???? (2022–2024)
- (Suriname) Dean Gorré (2024–Present)

== Current squad ==
- The following players were called up for the 2022 CONCACAF U-20 Championship.
- Match dates: 18 June – 3 July 2022
- Caps and goals correct as of: 25 June 2022
- Names in italics denote players who have been capped for the senior team.

No.	Pos.	Player	Date of birth (age)	Caps	Goals	Club
1	GK	Nino Fancito	30 September 2004 (age 22)	0	0	(Royal Dutch Football Association) FC Eindhoven
20	GK	Shedrion Mathilda	15 November 2004 (age 21)	0	0	(Curaçao Football Federation) SUBT
2	DF	Alrick Pantophlet	24 July 2003 (age 23)	4	0	(Royal Dutch Football Association) CRKSV Jong Holland
3	DF	Keanu Does	8 January 2004 (age 22)	4	3	(Royal Dutch Football Association) ADO Den Haag
4	DF	Jaïr Bryson	24 September 2003 (age 23)	4	1	(Royal Dutch Football Association) Telstar
5	DF	Denzley Griët	26 December 2003 (age 22)	4	0	(Royal Dutch Football Association) Dordrecht
8	DF	Ghillian Ilaria	25 April 2004 (age 22)	4	2	(Royal Dutch Football Association) Almere City
17	DF	Vinsley Cathalina	26 June 2003 (age 23)	0	0	(Curaçao Football Federation) SV Victory Boys
18	DF	Reuel Martina	11 September 2004 (age 22)	1	0	(Curaçao Football Federation) S.V. Vesta
6	MF	Rayhim Inesia	16 January 2004 (age 22)	4	0	(Curaçao Football Federation) Scherpenheuvel
10	MF	Naygiro Sambo	21 January 2004 (age 22)	3	5	(Royal Dutch Football Association) Vitesse
13	MF	Calvin Gustina	19 November 2004 (age 21)	0	0	(Royal Dutch Football Association) ADO Den Haag
7	FW	Jaydino Jacobus	13 April 2005 (age 21)	0	0	(Royal Dutch Football Association) NAC Breda
9	FW	Juruël Bernadina	11 May 2003 (age 23)	4	6	(Royal Dutch Football Association) FC Utrecht
11	FW	Gio-Renys Felicia	2 February 2004 (age 22)	4	2	Free agent
12	FW	Rayvian Job	25 April 2004 (age 22)	1	1	(Royal Dutch Football Association) Excelsior
14	FW	Sidney Kastaneer	6 March 2003 (age 23)	4	1	(Curaçao Football Federation) S.V. Vesta
15	FW	Nigel Marengo	2 February 2004 (age 22)	0	0	(Royal Dutch Football Association) Heerenveen
16	FW	Gior Selassa	29 April 2005 (age 21)	0	0	(Curaçao Football Federation) C.V.V. Willemstad
19	FW	Rayden Winklaar	27 March 2004 (age 22)	3	0	(Curaçao Football Federation) UNDEBA

== Coaching staff ==
Position	Name
Head coach	(Suriname) Dean Gorré
Assistant coach	(Curaçao) Gregory Hieronimus
Goalkeeper coach	(Curaçao) Rowendy Sumter
Equipment	(Curaçao) Olivier Windster
Massage therapists	(Curaçao) Clinton Leocadia (Curaçao) Robert Duncan
Team doctor	(Curaçao) Dr. Ramfis Fillet
Team manager	(Curaçao) Liviéna Rijnschot
Head of delegation	(Curaçao) Rudsel Schmidt

- Source: Curaçao U20 Staff and Players
