= 2020 Caribbean Club Shield =

2020 CONCACAF Caribbean Club Shield
Tournament details
- Host country: Curaçao
- City: Willemstad
- Dates: Cancelled (originally 3–12 April 2020)
- Teams: 15 (from 15 associations)
- Venues: 2 (in 1 host city)

The 2020 Caribbean Club Shield was originally to be the third edition of the Caribbean Club Shield (also known as the CFU Club Shield), the second-tier annual international club football competition in the Caribbean region, held amongst clubs whose football associations are affiliated with the Caribbean Football Union (CFU), a sub-confederation of CONCACAF.

The tournament was originally scheduled to be played in Curaçao between 3–12 April 2020. On 13 March 2020, CONCACAF suspended all upcoming competitions scheduled to take place over the next 30 days due to the COVID-19 pandemic, with the new dates of the tournament to be confirmed later. On 7 August 2020, they provided an update on the tournament, where they would make a final decision by the end of August to determine if it could be played in mid-September. On 25 August 2020, CONCACAF announced that as it was impossible to organize the tournament in September in order to provide qualification for the 2020 CONCACAF League which would start in October, the tournament was cancelled.

The winners of the 2020 CONCACAF Caribbean Club Shield, as long as they fulfill the CONCACAF Regional Club Licensing criteria, would originally play against the fourth place team of the 2020 CONCACAF Caribbean Club Championship in a playoff match to determine the final Caribbean spot to the 2020 CONCACAF League.

Robinhood were the title holders, but did not qualify for the tournament.

== Teams ==
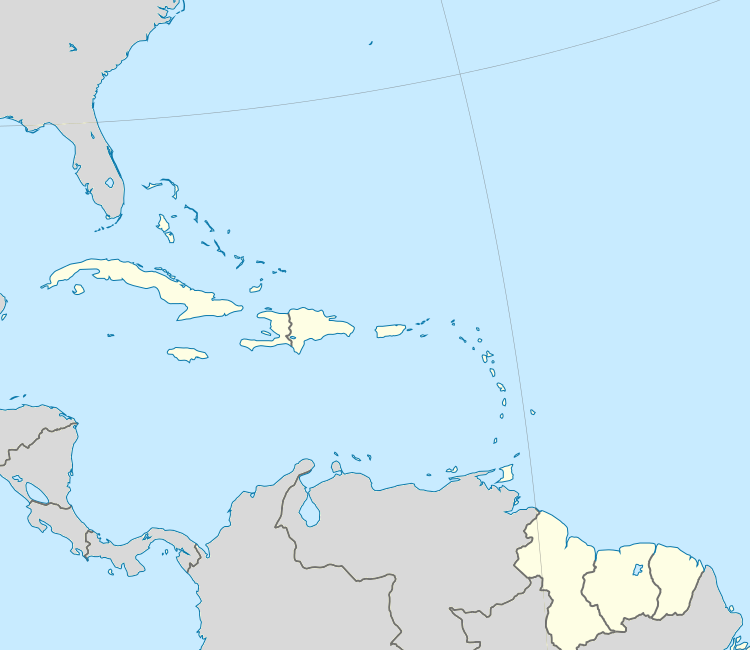
Location of teams of the 2020 CONCACAF Caribbean Club Shield
(H) Host.

Among the 31 CFU member associations, 27 of them were classified as non-professional leagues and each may enter one team in the CONCACAF Caribbean Club Shield. A total of 15 teams (from 15 associations) entered the 2020 CONCACAF Caribbean Club Shield.

Association	Team	Qualification method	App. (last)	Previous best (last)
Antigua and Barbuda	Liberta	2018–19 Antigua and Barbuda Premier Division champions	1st	Debut
Aruba	Racing Club Aruba	2018–19 Aruban Division di Honor champions	1st	Debut
Barbados	Barbados Defence Force	2018–19 Barbados Premier League champions	1st	Debut
Bonaire	Real Rincon	2018–19 Bonaire League champions	3rd (2019)	Third place (2018)
British Virgin Islands	One Love United	2018 BVIFA National Football League champions	1st	Debut
Cayman Islands	Scholars International	2018–19 Cayman Islands Premier League champions	2nd (2019)	Consolation matches (2019)
Cuba	Santiago de Cuba	2019 Campeonato Nacional de Fútbol de Cuba champions	2nd (2019)	Quarter-finals (2019)
Curaçao (hosts)	Vesta	2018–19 Curaçao Promé Divishon champions	1st	Debut
Dominica	South East	2018–19 Dominica Premier League champions	1st	Debut
Guadeloupe	Amical Club	2018–19 Guadeloupe Division of Honor champions	1st	Debut
Martinique	Club Franciscain	2018–19 Martinique Championnat National champions	3rd (2019)	Champions (2018)
Puerto Rico	Metropolitan	2018–19 Liga Puerto Rico champions	1st	Debut
Saint Lucia	Platinum FC	2019 SLFA First Division champions	2nd (2019)	Consolation matches (2019)
Saint Vincent and the Grenadines	BESCO Pastures	2018–19 SVGFF Premier Division champions	1st	Debut
Suriname	Inter Moengotapoe	2018–19 SVB Topklasse champions	2nd (2018)	Runners-up (2018)

Associations which did not enter a team

- Anguilla
- Bahamas
- Bermuda
- French Guiana
- Grenada
- Guyana
- Montserrat
- Saint Kitts and Nevis
- Saint Martin
- Sint Maarten
- Turks and Caicos Islands
- U.S. Virgin Islands

== Venues ==
The matches were originally to be played at the Ergilio Hato Stadium and Stadion dr. Antoine Maduro in Willemstad.

== Group stage ==
The draw for the group stage was held on 13 February 2020, 11:00 EST (UTC−5), at the CONCACAF Headquarters in Miami, United States. The 15 teams were drawn into four groups: three groups of four teams and one group of three teams. The team from the host association Curaçao, Vesta, were allocated to position A1, while the remaining 14 teams were drawn into the other group positions without any seeding.

The winners of each group would advance to the semi-finals.

All times local, AST (UTC−4).

=== Group A ===
Pos	Team	Pld	W	D	L	GF	GA	GD	Pts	Qualification
1	(Curaçao) Vesta (H)	0	0	0	0	0	0	0	0	Knockout stage
2	Barbados Defence Force	0	0	0	0	0	0	0	0	
3	(Martinique) Club Franciscain	0	0	0	0	0	0	0	0	
4	(Dominica) South East	0	0	0	0	0	0	0	0	

Source: CONCACAF
(H) Hosts
3 April 2020
12:30

Barbados Defence Force	Cancelled	(Martinique) Club Franciscain

Ergilio Hato Stadium, Willemstad
3 April 2020
20:00

Vesta (Curaçao)	Cancelled	(Dominica) South East

Ergilio Hato Stadium, Willemstad

5 April 2020
17:30

Barbados Defence Force	Cancelled	(Dominica) South East

Stadion dr. Antoine Maduro, Willemstad
5 April 2020
20:00

Vesta (Curaçao)	Cancelled	(Martinique) Club Franciscain

Ergilio Hato Stadium, Willemstad

7 April 2020
15:00

Club Franciscain (Martinique)	Cancelled	(Dominica) South East

Stadion dr. Antoine Maduro, Willemstad
7 April 2020
20:00

Vesta (Curaçao)	Cancelled	Barbados Defence Force

Ergilio Hato Stadium, Willemstad

=== Group B ===
Pos	Team	Pld	W	D	L	GF	GA	GD	Pts	Qualification
1	(Suriname) Inter Moengotapoe	0	0	0	0	0	0	0	0	Knockout stage
2	(Puerto Rico) Metropolitan	0	0	0	0	0	0	0	0	
3	Santiago de Cuba	0	0	0	0	0	0	0	0	
4	(Cayman Islands) Scholars International	0	0	0	0	0	0	0	0	

Source: CONCACAF
3 April 2020
15:00

Metropolitan (Puerto Rico)	Cancelled	Santiago de Cuba

Ergilio Hato Stadium, Willemstad
3 April 2020
20:00

Inter Moengotapoe (Suriname)	Cancelled	(Cayman Islands) Scholars International

Stadion dr. Antoine Maduro, Willemstad

5 April 2020
15:00

Metropolitan (Puerto Rico)	Cancelled	(Cayman Islands) Scholars International

Stadion dr. Antoine Maduro, Willemstad
5 April 2020
17:30

Inter Moengotapoe (Suriname)	Cancelled	Santiago de Cuba

Ergilio Hato Stadium, Willemstad

7 April 2020
12:30

Santiago de Cuba	Cancelled	(Cayman Islands) Scholars International

Ergilio Hato Stadium, Willemstad
7 April 2020
17:30

Inter Moengotapoe (Suriname)	Cancelled	(Puerto Rico) Metropolitan

Stadion dr. Antoine Maduro, Willemstad

=== Group C ===
Pos	Team	Pld	W	D	L	GF	GA	GD	Pts	Qualification
1	(British Virgin Islands) One Love United	0	0	0	0	0	0	0	0	Knockout stage
2	(Antigua and Barbuda) Liberta	0	0	0	0	0	0	0	0	
3	Racing Club Aruba	0	0	0	0	0	0	0	0	
4	(Guadeloupe) Amical Club	0	0	0	0	0	0	0	0	

Source: CONCACAF
3 April 2020
15:00

Liberta (Antigua and Barbuda)	Cancelled	Racing Club Aruba

Stadion dr. Antoine Maduro, Willemstad
3 April 2020
17:30

One Love United (British Virgin Islands)	Cancelled	(Guadeloupe) Amical Club

Ergilio Hato Stadium, Willemstad

5 April 2020
12:30

One Love United (British Virgin Islands)	Cancelled	Racing Club Aruba

Ergilio Hato Stadium, Willemstad
5 April 2020
20:00

Liberta (Antigua and Barbuda)	Cancelled	(Guadeloupe) Amical Club

Stadion dr. Antoine Maduro, Willemstad

7 April 2020
15:00

One Love United (British Virgin Islands)	Cancelled	(Antigua and Barbuda) Liberta

Ergilio Hato Stadium, Willemstad
7 April 2020
17:30

Racing Club Aruba	Cancelled	(Guadeloupe) Amical Club

Ergilio Hato Stadium, Willemstad

=== Group D ===
Pos	Team	Pld	W	D	L	GF	GA	GD	Pts	Qualification
1	(Saint Vincent and the Grenadines) BESCO Pastures	0	0	0	0	0	0	0	0	Knockout stage
2	(Bonaire) Real Rincon	0	0	0	0	0	0	0	0	
3	(Saint Lucia) Platinum FC	0	0	0	0	0	0	0	0	

Source: CONCACAF
3 April 2020
17:30

BESCO Pastures (Saint Vincent and the Grenadines)	Cancelled	(Saint Lucia) Platinum FC

Stadion dr. Antoine Maduro, Willemstad

5 April 2020
15:00

Real Rincon (Bonaire)	Cancelled	(Saint Lucia) Platinum FC

Ergilio Hato Stadium, Willemstad

7 April 2020
20:00

BESCO Pastures (Saint Vincent and the Grenadines)	Cancelled	(Bonaire) Real Rincon

Stadion dr. Antoine Maduro, Willemstad

== Knockout stage ==
=== Bracket ===
The semi-final matchups would be:

- SF1: Group B Winners vs. Group D Winners
- SF2: Group A Winners vs. Group C Winners

The winners of SF1 and SF2 would play in the final, while the losers of SF1 and SF2 would play in the third place match.

Semi-finals
10 April – Ergilio Hato Stadium
Group B Winners
Group D Winners
10 April – Ergilio Hato Stadium
Group A Winners
Group C Winners

Final
12 April – Ergilio Hato Stadium
Semi-final 1 Winners
Semi-final 2 Winners
Third place match
12 April – Ergilio Hato Stadium
Semi-final 1 Losers
Semi-final 2 Losers

=== Semi-finals ===
10 April 2020
17:00

Group B Winners	Cancelled	Group D Winners

Ergilio Hato Stadium, Willemstad

10 April 2020
20:00

Group A Winners	Cancelled	Group C Winners

Ergilio Hato Stadium, Willemstad

=== Third place match ===
12 April 2020
17:00

Semi-final 1 Losers	Cancelled	Semi-final 2 Losers

Ergilio Hato Stadium, Willemstad

=== Final ===
Winners would advance to CONCACAF League playoff against 2020 CONCACAF Caribbean Club Championship fourth-placed team for a place in 2020 CONCACAF League preliminary round, as long as they comply with the minimum CONCACAF Club Licensing requirements for the CONCACAF League.

12 April 2020
20:00

Semi-final 1 Winners	Cancelled	Semi-final 2 Winners

Ergilio Hato Stadium, Willemstad

== See also ==
- 2020 Caribbean Club Championship
- 2020 CONCACAF League
- 2021 CONCACAF Champions League
