= 1941 CCCF Championship squads =

These are the squads for the countries that played in the 1941 CCCF Championship.

The age listed for each player is on 8 May 1941, the first day of the tournament. The numbers of caps and goals listed for each player do not include any matches played after the start of the tournament. The club listed is the club for which the player last played a competitive match before the tournament. The nationality for each club reflects the national association (not the league) to which the club is affiliated. A flag is included for coaches who are of a different nationality than their own national team.

== Costa Rica ==
Head coach: Alejandro Morera Soto

No.	Pos.	Player	Date of birth (age)	Caps	Goals	Club
1	GK	Hugo Zúñiga		0	0	(Costa Rican Football Federation) Gimnástica Española
2	GK	Luis Ángel Sala		0	0	(Costa Rican Football Federation) Alajuelense
3	DF	Milton Valverde	26 July 1907 (aged 33)	0	0	(Costa Rican Football Federation) Herediano
4	DF	Enrique Lizano	1913	0	0	(Costa Rican Football Federation) Herediano
5	DF	Chale Silva	1 March 1919 (aged 22)	0	0	(Costa Rican Football Federation) Orión
6	DF	Santiago Bonilla	1 March 1910 (aged 31)	0	0	(Costa Rican Football Federation) Herediano
7	MF	Carlos Garita	14 July 1914 (aged 26)	0	0	(Costa Rican Football Federation) Alajuelense
8	MF	Gregorio Morales		0	0	(Costa Rican Football Federation) La Libertad
9	MF	Mario Valera		0	0	(Costa Rican Football Federation) Orión
10	MF	Jorge "Lalo" Rojas	25 March 1918 (aged 23)	0	0	(Costa Rican Football Federation) Alajuelense
11	FW	Emmanuel Amador	3 October 1914 (aged 26)	0	0	(Costa Rican Football Federation) La Libertad
12	FW	José Luis Rojas	18 May 1921 (aged 19)	0	0	(Costa Rican Football Federation) Herediano
13	FW	Aníbal Varela	12 January 1912 (aged 29)	0	0	(Costa Rican Football Federation) Herediano
14	FW	José Rafael Meza	6 July 1920 (aged 20)	0	0	(Costa Rican Football Federation) Cartaginés
15	FW	Jesús María Araya	22 April 1916 (aged 25)	0	0	(Costa Rican Football Federation) Orión
16	FW	Víctor Viquez		0	0	(Costa Rican Football Federation) Herediano
17	FW	Walker Rodríguez		0	0	(Costa Rican Football Federation) Orión
18	FW	Alfonso Arnáez		0	0	(Costa Rican Football Federation) Cartaginés

== Curaçao ==
Head coach: Antoine J. Maduro

No.	Pos.	Player	Date of birth (age)	Caps	Goals	Club
1	GK	Ezequiel Vos		0	0	(Royal Dutch Football Association) Hercules
2	GK	Charlie Salcedo		0	0	(Curaçao Football Federation) SUBT
3	DF	Antoine J. Maduro	20 August 1909 (aged 31)	0	0	(Curaçao Football Federation) SUBT
4	DF	Edmundo Confessor	12 December 1922 (aged 18)	0	0	(Royal Dutch Football Association) Hercules
5	DF	Moi Davelaar		0	0	(Curaçao Football Federation) SUBT
6	DF	Hugo Bakhuis		0	0	(Curaçao Football Federation) SUBT
7	MF	Patricio Joeri		0	0	(Curaçao Football Federation) Jong Holland
8	MF	Guillermo Rosario	6 January 1917 (aged 24)	0	0	(Curaçao Football Federation) Racing Club Curaçao
9	MF	José María Eduarda		0	0	(Aruba Football Federation) CVV Volharding
10	MF	Alejandro Thode		0	0	(Curaçao Football Federation) Scherpenheuvel
11	MF	Mario Sevilo Jansen		0	0	(Curaçao Football Federation) SUBT
12	MF	Federico Jansen		0	0	(Curaçao Football Federation) SUBT
13	MF	Hans Nahar	6 September 1910 (aged 30)	0	0	(Aruba Football Federation) SV Aruba Juniors
14	MF	Humberto Panneflek		0	0	(Curaçao Football Federation) Racing Club Curaçao
15	MF	Guillermo Pardo	14 September 1920 (aged 20)	0	0	(Curaçao Football Federation) Jong Holland
16	MF	Shon Arei Bernabela		0	0	(Curaçao Football Federation) SUBT
17	FW	Charlie Becker		0	0	(Curaçao Football Federation) Scherpenheuvel
18	FW	George Curiel		0	0	(Royal Dutch Football Association) Hercules

== El Salvador ==
Head coach: Charles Slade

No.	Pos.	Player	Date of birth (age)	Caps	Goals	Club
1	GK	Miguel Ángel Guardado		0	0	(Salvadoran Football Federation) España
2	GK	Edmundo Majano		0	0	(Salvadoran Football Federation) España
3	DF	Napoleón Corvera		0	0	(Salvadoran Football Federation)
4	DF	Freddy Maida		0	0	(Salvadoran Football Federation) Juventud
5	DF	Adrián Díaz		0	0	(Salvadoran Football Federation) Quequeisque
6	DF	Miguel Ezequiel Campos		0	0	(Salvadoran Football Federation) Quequeisque
7	DF	Domingo Leónidas Flores		0	0	(Salvadoran Football Federation) Juventud
8	MF	José Américo González	13 August 1912 (aged 28)	0	0	(Salvadoran Football Federation) Hércules
9	MF	Julián Linares		0	0	(Salvadoran Football Federation) Juventud
10	MF	Manuel Cano		0	0	(Salvadoran Football Federation) Hércules
11	FW	Gustavo Donado		0	0	(Salvadoran Football Federation) España
12	FW	Jorge René Méndez		0	0	(Salvadoran Football Federation) Quequeisque
13	FW	René Gutiérrez		0	0	(Salvadoran Football Federation) Juventud
14	FW	Miguel José Deras		0	0	(Salvadoran Football Federation) Quequeisque
15	FW	Alejandro Contreras		0	0	(Salvadoran Football Federation) España
16	FW	Luis Alonso Torres		0	0	(Salvadoran Football Federation)
17	FW	Aquilino Rosales		0	0	(Salvadoran Football Federation)
18	FW	Antonio Toledo Valle	1912 (aged 27–28)	0	0	(Salvadoran Football Federation) España

== Nicaragua ==
Head coach: Edmundo Salas

No.	Pos.	Player	Date of birth (age)	Caps	Goals	Club
1	GK	José León Sánchez		0	0	(Nicaraguan Football Federation) Diriangén
2	GK	Alfredo Francisco Cardoza		0	0	(Nicaraguan Football Federation)
3	DF	Abraham Rocha		0	0	(Nicaraguan Football Federation)
4	DF	Humberto Martínez		0	0	(Nicaraguan Football Federation) Diriangén
5	DF	Miguel Ángel González		0	0	(Nicaraguan Football Federation)
6	MF	Manuel González		0	0	(Nicaraguan Football Federation) Diriangén
7	MF	Rodolfo Fajardo		0	0	(Nicaraguan Football Federation)
8	MF	José Américo González		0	0	(Nicaraguan Football Federation)
9	MF	Guillermo Morales		0	0	(Nicaraguan Football Federation)
10	MF	Otto Rodríguez		0	0	(Nicaraguan Football Federation)
11	MF	Virgilio Paniagua		0	0	(Nicaraguan Football Federation)
12	MF	Raúl Subarrio		0	0	(Nicaraguan Football Federation)
13	FW	Francisco Gutiérrez		0	0	(Nicaraguan Football Federation) Diriangén
14	FW	Ramón García		0	0	(Nicaraguan Football Federation) Diriangén
15	FW	Juan Robleto		0	0	(Nicaraguan Football Federation) Diriangén
16	FW	Alfredo Mendieta		0	0	(Nicaraguan Football Federation)
17	FW	Dolores Morales		0	0	(Nicaraguan Football Federation)
18	FW	Efraín Arroligo		0	0	(Nicaraguan Football Federation)

== Panama ==
Head coach: / Manuel Sánchez Durán

No.	Pos.	Player	Date of birth (age)	Caps	Goals	Club
1	GK	Andrés Ortiz		0	0	(Panamanian Football Federation)
2	GK	Manuel Sánchez Durán		0	0	(Peruvian Football Federation)
3	DF	Carlos Romoltón		0	0	(Panamanian Football Federation)
4	DF	Félix Tejada		0	0	(Panamanian Football Federation)
5	DF	Alberto Martínez		0	0	(Panamanian Football Federation)
6	MF	Virgilio Castro		0	0	(Panamanian Football Federation)
7	MF	Eduardo Márquez		0	0	(Panamanian Football Federation)
8	FW	Antoine Neville	9 March 1918 (aged 23)	0	0	(Panamanian Football Federation)
9	FW	Antonio Morales		0	0	(Panamanian Football Federation)
10	FW	José Manuel Alzamora		0	0	(Panamanian Football Federation)
11	FW	James Santiago Anderson	14 July 1916 (aged 24)	0	0	(Panamanian Football Federation)
12	MF	Azael Ospino		0	0	(Panamanian Football Federation)
13	FW	Pablo Emilio Prado		0	0	(Panamanian Football Federation)
14	FW	Luis Carlos Rangel		0	0	(Panamanian Football Federation)
15	FW	Eduardo Fenton		0	0	(Panamanian Football Federation)
16	FW	Luis Mata		0	0	(Panamanian Football Federation)
17	FW	Eduardo McLeary		0	0	(Panamanian Football Federation)
18	FW	Lucas Sánchez		0	0	(Panamanian Football Federation)
