= Football in Curaçao =

The sport of association football in Curaçao is run by the Curaçao Football Federation. The association administers the national football team, as well as the Curaçao League. The main annual football tournament is the Chippie Polar Cup, an annual friendly event held since 2004 which has involved clubs from the Netherlands, Brazil, Suriname, Aruba and Curaçao.

== The Chippie Polar Cup ==
The tournament is organized by Project Support Curaçao NV (PSC) and the matches are held at the Ergilio Hato Stadion (SDK), in Brievengat. The first two editions were held under the name Inter Expo Cup.

=== Cup winners ===
- 2004: Netherlands Antilles national football team
- 2005: (Suriname) Walking Bout Company
- 2006: (Netherlands) FC Groningen
- 2007: (Netherlands) FC Utrecht
- 2008: (Netherlands) FC Groningen
- 2009: (Netherlands Antilles) Dutch Caribbean Stars
- 2010: (Netherlands) Ajax
- 2013: (Netherlands) ADO Den Haag

=== 2004 Edition ===
January 2004

- Netherlands Antilles 2 - 2 FC Dordrecht
- Suriname 0 - 0 (Netherlands) SC Cambuur
- Netherlands Antilles 2 - 1 SC Cambuur
- Suriname 4 - 2 (Netherlands) FC Dordrecht
- FC Dordrecht (Netherlands) 0 - 4 (Netherlands) SC Cambuur
- Netherlands Antilles 2 - 0 Suriname

Team	Pld	W	D	L	GF	GA	GD	Pts
Netherlands Antilles	3	2	1	0	6	3	+3	7
(Netherlands) SC Cambuur	3	1	1	1	5	2	+3	4
Suriname	3	1	1	1	4	4	0	4
(Netherlands) FC Dordrecht	3	0	1	2	4	10	–6	1

=== 2005 Edition ===
January 2005

- Walking Bout Company (Suriname) 2 - 1 (Netherlands) FC Dordrecht
- Netherlands Antilles 2 - 3 Jong Feyenoord
- Jong Feyenoord (Netherlands) 0 - 0 (Netherlands) FC Dordrecht
- Netherlands Antilles 0 - 4 (Suriname) Walking Bout Company
- Netherlands Antilles 1 - 2 FC Dordrecht
- Walking Bout Company (Suriname) 0 - 0 (Netherlands) Jong Feyenoord

Team	Pld	W	D	L	GF	GA	GD	Pts
(Suriname) Walking Bout Company	3	2	1	0	6	1	+5	7
(Netherlands) Jong Feyenoord	3	1	2	0	3	2	+1	5
(Netherlands) FC Dordrecht	3	1	1	1	3	3	0	4
Netherlands Antilles	3	0	0	3	3	9	–6	0

=== 2006 Edition ===
May 2006:

- FC Groningen (Netherlands) 2 - 1 (Suriname) Suriprofs
- Deportivo Barber 3 - 1 Netherlands Antilles U21

Third place match:

- Suriprofs (Suriname) 5 - 2 Netherlands Antilles U21

Final:

- FC Groningen (Netherlands) 2 - 1 (Netherlands Antilles) Deportivo Barber

=== 2007 Edition ===
June 2007:

- FC Utrecht (Netherlands) 2 - 1 (Netherlands) FC Dordrecht
- Deportivo Barber (Netherlands Antilles) 0 - 2 (Brazil) Ferroviário AC

Third place match:

- Deportivo Barber (Netherlands Antilles) 1 - 1 (Netherlands) FC Dordrecht (Deportivo Barber wins 4 - 3 on penalties)

Final:

- FC Utrecht (Netherlands) 1 - 0 (Brazil) Ferroviário AC

=== 2008 Edition ===
May 2008:

- Netherlands Antilles 2 - 1 Suriname
- FC Groningen (Netherlands) 3 - 0 (Brazil) EC Flamengo

Third place match:

- EC Flamengo (Brazil) 2 - 0 Suriname

Final:

- Netherlands Antilles 2 - 4 FC Groningen

=== 2009 Edition ===
May 2009:

- RKSV Centro Dominguito (Netherlands Antilles) 5 - 0 (Aruba) SV Britannia
- Dutch Caribbean Stars (Netherlands Antilles) 4 - 0 (Suriname) FCS Nacional

Third place match:

- FCS Nacional (Suriname) 4 - 2 (Aruba) SV Britannia

Final:

- Dutch Caribbean Stars (Netherlands Antilles) 1 - 1 (Netherlands Antilles) RKSV Centro Dominguito (DCS wins on penalties)

=== 2010 Edition ===
21–23 May.

- Dutch Caribbean Stars (Netherlands Antilles) 1 - 4 (Netherlands) N.E.C.
- Ajax (Netherlands) 3 - 0 (Netherlands Antilles) Hubentut Fortuna

Third place match:

- Hubentut Fortuna (Netherlands Antilles) 2 - 0 (Netherlands Antilles) Dutch Caribbean Stars

Final:

- N.E.C. (Netherlands) 0 - 0 (Netherlands) Ajax (Ajax wins 3 - 4 on penalties)

=== 2013 Edition ===
29 May – 21 June.
The tournament was not held in 2011 and 2012, but returned under a new sponsor in 2013 and known as the Multipost Polar Cup.

- ADO Den Haag (Netherlands) 2 - 0 (Netherlands) FC Dordrecht
- Inter Moengotapoe (Suriname) 1 - 2 (Curaçao) RKSV Centro Dominguito

Third place match:

- FC Dordrecht (Netherlands) 2 - 1 (Suriname) Inter Moengotapoe

Final:

- ADO Den Haag (Netherlands) 2 - 2 (Curaçao) RKSV Centro Dominguito (ADO Den Haag wins 4 - 3 on penalties)

== Dutch Caribbean Stars ==
Dutch Caribbean Stars is an organization that participates in charity matches with players from the Netherlands, the Netherlands Antilles and Aruba.

=== History ===
The foundation was founded in 2009 and the team is headed by former N.E.C. player and assistant coach of the Curaçao national football team, Remko Bicentini. The proceeds will benefit (youth) sports projects in the Netherlands Antilles and Aruba. The Dutch Caribbean Stars are intended as a counterpart to the Suri Profs from Suriname. DCS won the 2009 Chippie Polar Cup defeating RKSV Centro Dominguito in penalty kicks.

On 9 May 2010 the Dutch Caribbean Stars travelled to Dordrecht, Netherlands to play in a charity match against FC Dordrecht.

== League system ==
Level	League(s)/Division(s)
1	Curaçao League; 10 clubs
	↓↑ 0-1 club
2	First División; 10 clubs

== Stadiums in Curaçao ==
Stadium	Country	Capacity	Image
Ergilio Hato Stadium	Curaçao	10,000	

== See also ==
- Soccer in Saba
- Lists of stadiums
