= Mirco Colina =

Curaçaoan football player (born 1990)

Personal information
- Full name: Mirco Dwight Tadeo Colina
- Date of birth: 23 May 1990 (age 36)
- Place of birth: Willemstad, Netherlands Antilles
- Height: 1.81 m (5 ft 11 in)
- Position: Forward

Team information
- Current team: CSD Barber
- Number: 7

Senior career*
Years	Team	Apps	(Gls)
2007–2011	Vesta	?	(?)
2012	Sithoc	?	(?)
2013–2014	Centro Dominguito	?	(?)
2015–	CSD Barber	?	(?)

International career^{‡}
2010	Netherlands Antilles	5	(0)
2011	Curaçao U-23	3	(2)
2011–	Curaçao	15	(5)
- * Club domestic league appearances and goals as of 11 October 2015 ‡ National team caps and goals as of 00:00, 11 October 2021 (UTC)

Mirco Dwight Tadeo Colina (born 23 May 1990) is a Curaçaoan footballer who plays forward for CSD Barber in the Sekshon Pagá and for the Curaçao national team.

== Club career ==
Born in Willemstad, Netherlands Antilles, Colina began his career with S.V. Vesta in the Sekshon Pagá, the highest level of football in Curaçao. He parted with the club after five seasons, playing briefly for RKV FC Sithoc before signing with RKSV Centro Dominguito, whom he helped to their third national championship in 2013. Playing one more season with Centro, Colina then transferred to CSD Barber.

== International career ==
Colina plays for the national team of Curaçao, having previously played for the Netherlands Antilles before the country's dissolution.

He made his debut for the Netherlands Antilles on 13 October 2010 Caribbean Cup qualification match against Suriname, which ended in a 2–1 loss. He then made four more appearances for the Netherlands Antilles playing against Guyana, Saint Lucia, Aruba and Suriname.

On 19 August 2011, Colina made his first appearance for Curaçao in the countries first official match after the dissolution of the Netherlands Antilles, a friendly encounter against the Dominican Republic ending in a 1–0 loss. On 25 September 2011 he scored his first two goals for the national team in a 2–2 draw with Suriname.

== Career statistics ==
=== International performance ===
Statistics accurate as of matches played on 15 November 2014,

Netherlands Antilles national team
Year	Apps	Goals
2010	5	0
Total	5	0

Curaçao national team
Year	Apps	Goals
2011	6	2
2012	4	1
2013	2	0
2014	2	0
Total	14	3

==== International goals ====
Scores and results list Curaçao's goal tally first.

No.	Date	Venue	Opponent	Score	Result	Competition
1.	25 September 2011	André Kamperveen Stadion, Paramaribo, Suriname	Suriname	1–1	2–2	Friendly
2.	25 September 2011	André Kamperveen Stadion, Paramaribo, Suriname	Suriname	2–2	2–2	Friendly
3.	14 July 2012	Trinidad Stadium, Oranjestad, Aruba	Aruba	2–2	2–3	2012 ABCS Tournament
4.	1 October 2021	FFK Stadium, Willemstad, Curaçao	Aruba	1–0	7–1	2021 ABCS Tournament
5.	1 October 2021	FFK Stadium, Willemstad, Curaçao	Aruba	3–0	7–1	2021 ABCS Tournament

== Honours ==
RKSV Centro Dominguito

- Sekshon Pagá: 2013
