= Elson Hooi =

Curaçaoan footballer (born 1991)

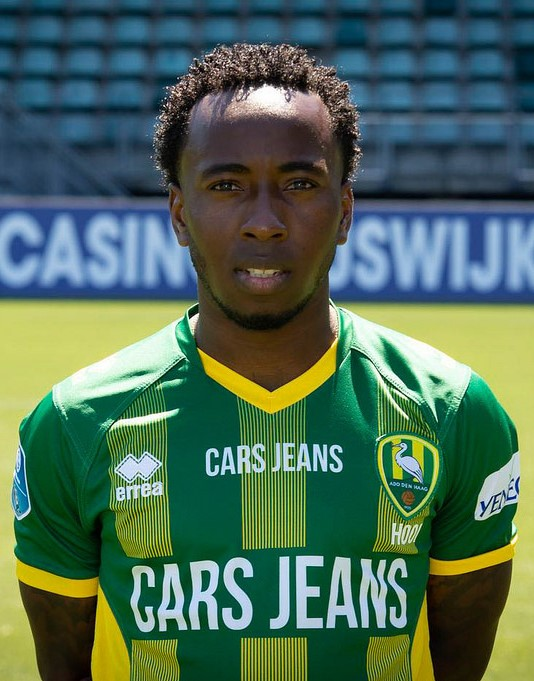
- Hooi with ADO Den Haag in 2018

Personal information
- Full name: Elson Quincy Hooi
- Date of birth: 1 October 1991 (age 35)
- Place of birth: Willemstad, Curacao, Netherlands Antilles
- Height: 1.69 m (5 ft 7 in)
- Position: Right winger

Team information
- Current team: Nara United
- Number: 10

Youth career
- CVV Willemstad
- NAC

Senior career*
Years	Team	Apps	(Gls)
2012–2016	NAC	75	(9)
2015	→ Viborg (loan)	11	(1)
2016	→ Volendam (loan)	14	(3)
2016–2017	Ermis Aradippou	7	(0)
2017	Vendsyssel FF	3	(0)
2017–2020	ADO Den Haag	63	(3)
2020–2021	Muaither	5	(3)
2021–2022	Al Tadhamon		(1)
2022–2024	Al-Minaa	6	(0)
2024–2025	Chiangmai United	29	(10)
2025	Nakhon Ratchasima	0	(0)
2026	Samut Songkhram City		
2026-	Nara United	28	(7)

International career^{‡}
2011	Curaçao U20	3	(1)
2012	Curaçao U23	3	(0)
2015–2023	Curaçao	34	(8)
2015–2018	Curaçao XI	4	(2)
- * Club domestic league appearances and goals as of 1 July 2026 ‡ National team caps and goals as of 18 October 2023

Elson Quincy Hooi (born 1 October 1991) is a Curaçaoan footballer who plays as a right winger for Thai League 2 club Nara United and the Curaçao national team. He formerly played for NAC Breda, Viborg FF, FC Volendam, Ermis Aradippou, and Vendsyssel FF.

== Club career ==
He joined Volendam on loan from NAC in January 2016 and signed with ADO Den Haag in 2017.

He later jumped on a journeyman career, playing in Cyprus, Qatar, Kuwait en Iraq before settling in Thailand where swapped Chiangmai United for Nakhon Ratchasima in 2025.

Hooi won promotion to Thai League 2 in 2026 with Nara United.

== International career ==
The stocky Hooi was raised in the Netherlands, but was born in Curaçao and represents the Curaçao national team. He won the 2017 Caribbean Cup with the Curaçao national team, and was also the top scorer of that competition.

== Career statistics ==
=== International goals ===
As of match played 25 March 2021. Curaçao score listed first, score column indicates score after each Hooi goal.

International goals by date, venue, cap, opponent, score, result and competition
No.	Date	Venue	Cap	Opponent	Score	Result	Competition
1	25 June 2017	Stade Pierre-Aliker, Fort-de-France, Martinique	9	Jamaica	1–0	2–1	2017 Caribbean Cup
2	25 June 2017	Stade Pierre-Aliker, Fort-de-France, Martinique	9	Jamaica	2–1	2–1	2017 Caribbean Cup
3	10 October 2017	Jassim Bin Hamad Stadium, Doha, Qatar	13	Qatar	2–1	2–1	Friendly
4	10 September 2018	Ergilio Hato Stadium, Willemstad, Curaçao	16	Grenada	1–0	10–0	2019–20 CONCACAF Nations League qualification
5	19 November 2018	Ergilio Hato Stadium, Willemstad, Curaçao	18	Guadeloupe	2–0	6–0	2019–20 CONCACAF Nations League qualification
6	19 November 2018	Ergilio Hato Stadium, Willemstad, Curaçao	18	Guadeloupe	5–0	6–0	2019–20 CONCACAF Nations League qualification
7	5 June 2019	Chang Arena, Buriram, Thailand	20	India	2–0	3–1	2019 King's Cup
8	7 September 2019	Ergilio Hato Stadium, Willemstad, Curaçao	26	Haiti	1–0	1–0	2019–20 CONCACAF Nations League A
9	10 September 2019	Stade Sylvio Cator, Port-au-Prince, Haiti	27	Haiti	1–1	1–1	2019–20 CONCACAF Nations League A
10	25 March 2021	Stadion dr. Antoine Maduro, Willemstad, Curaçao	30	Saint Vincent and the Grenadines	5–0	5–0	2022 FIFA World Cup qualification

== Honours ==
Viborg FF

- Danish 1st Division: 2014–15

Curaçao

- Caribbean Cup: 2017
- King's Cup: 2019
