= Pedrinho Sousa =

Curaçao footballer

Pedrinho
Personal information
- Full name: Pedro Xavier da Silva de Sousa
- Date of birth: 7 July 1990 (age 36)
- Place of birth: Willemstad, Curaçao
- Height: 1.73 m (5 ft 8 in)
- Position: Goalkeeper

Team information
- Current team: CVV Willemstad
- Number: 1

Youth career
- 1996–2003: UNDEBA
- 2005–2008: RKSV Scherpenheuvel

Senior career*
Years	Team	Apps	(Gls)
2008–2009	RKSV Centro Dominguito	4	(0)
2010	CVV Willemstad	20	(0)
2011	UNDEBA	5	(0)
2012–2014	RKSV Centro Dominguito	10	(0)
2014–	CVV Willemstad	45	(0)
- * Club domestic league appearances and goals as of 5 March 2017

Pedro Xavier da Silva de Sousa (born 7 July 1990), commonly known as Pedrinho, is a Curaçaoan footballer who plays as a goalkeeper for CVV Willemstad. He formerly played for RKSV Centro Dominguito and UNDEBA. He was born and raised in Curaçao, but holds Portuguese nationality from his parents.
