= Jarzinho Pieter =

Curaçaoan footballer (1987–2019)

Personal information
- Full name: Jarzinho Saul Emmanuel Pieter
- Date of birth: 11 November 1987
- Place of birth: Willemstad, Curaçao, Netherlands Antilles
- Date of death: 9 September 2019 (aged 31)
- Place of death: Port-au-Prince, Haiti
- Height: 1.87 m (6 ft 2 in)
- Position: Goalkeeper

Senior career*
Years	Team	Apps	(Gls)
2007–2018	Centro Dominguito		
2018–2019	Vesta		

International career^{‡}
2013–2019	Curaçao	12	(0)
- * Club domestic league appearances and goals as of 13 October 2018 ‡ National team caps and goals as of 13 October 2018

Jarzinho Saul Emmanuel Pieter (11 November 1987 – 9 September 2019) was a Curaçaoan professional footballer who played as a goalkeeper for the Curaçaoan clubs Centro Dominguito and Vesta and for the Curaçao national team.

== International career ==
Pieter made his debut for the Curaçao national football team in a 2–0 friendly win over Aruba on 14 November 2013. He was called up to represent Curaçao at the 2017 CONCACAF Gold Cup.

== Death ==
On 9 September 2019, Pieter died of a heart attack after falling ill the night before. Pieter was in Port-au-Prince, Haiti with the Curaçao national football team for a CONCACAF Nations League qualifying match against Haiti.

== Honours ==
Centro Dominguito

- Sekshon Pagá: 2012, 2013, 2015, 2016, 2017

Curaçao

- Caribbean Cup: 2017
- King's Cup: 2019
