= Everon Espacia =

Curaçaoan footballer

Personal information
- Date of birth: 22 February 1984 (age 42)
- Place of birth: Willemstad, Curaçao
- Height: 1.78 m (5 ft 10 in)
- Position: Midfielder

Senior career*
Years	Team	Apps	(Gls)
2009–2014	Hubentut Fortuna		
2015	CRKSV Jong Colombia		
2016–	S.V. Vesta		

International career
2006–2010	Netherlands MNT	10	(2)
2011–2013	Curaçao MNT	3	(3)
- * Club domestic league appearances and goals

Everon Espacia (born 22 February 1984) is a Curaçaoan footballer who plays as a midfielder. He played at the 2014 FIFA World Cup qualifier.

== See also ==
- Football in Curaçao
