= Daymon Lodovica =

Curaçao footballer

Personal information
- Full name: Daymon Lodovica
- Date of birth: 16 August 1989 (age 37)
- Place of birth: Curaçao
- Position: Forward

Team information
- Current team: UNDEBA
- Number: 9

Senior career*
Years	Team	Apps	(Gls)
2007–2014	UNDEBA		
2015	CRKSV Jong Holland		
2016–	SV Atomic		

International career^{‡}
2011	Curaçao	6	(0)
- * Club domestic league appearances and goals as of 31 May 2018 ‡ National team caps and goals as of 31 May 2018

Daymon Lodovica (born 16 August 1989) in Curaçao is a footballer who plays as a forward. He currently plays for UNDEBA in the Curaçao League and the Curaçao national football team.

== Club career ==
In 2007, he signed for Curaçao League side CRKSV Jong Holland.

== International career ==
He started his international career with Curaçao national football team in 2011.
