= Kampionato =

Kampionato means championship in Papiamento, the creole language of Dutch Caribbean, may refer to:

- Kampionato (Bonaire), a football league of Bonaire
- Kampionato Antiano, former football league of the Netherlands Antilles
- Kampionato (Curaçao), a football league of Curaçao
