= 2009–10 Curaçao Sekshon Pagá =

Curaçao Sekshon Pagá
- Season: 2009–10
- Champions: Hubentut Fortuna

The 2009–10 Curaçao Sekshon Pagá was the 2009–10 season of the football league Curaçao Sekshon Pagá.

== Final ==
The 2010 Curaçao Sekshon Pagá Final took place on 15 August 2010 at Stadion Ergilio Hato in Willemstad, Curaçao. Hubentut Fortuna defeated the Centro Social Deportivo Barber 1–0 with a goal from Tyrone Maria.
