= Pio Martins =

Uruguayan footballer (born 1993)

Personal information
- Full name: Maickol Pio Martins Aristegui
- Date of birth: 29 April 1993 (age 33)
- Place of birth: Punta del Este, Uruguay
- Height: 1.78 m (5 ft 10 in)
- Positions: Midfielder; striker

Team information
- Current team: Liria Prizren
- Number: 9

Youth career
- Rentistas

Senior career*
Years	Team	Apps	(Gls)
–2013	Rentistas	1	(0)
2013–2014	Deportivo Maldonado	8	(0)
2014–2015	Tacuarembó	1	(0)
2016–2017	Scherpenheuvel		
2018–2019	Al Nabi Chit	5	(0)
2019–	Liria Prizren		
- * Club domestic league appearances and goals as of 20:04, 25 January 2021 (UTC)

Maickol Pio Martins Aristegui (born 29 April 1993) is a Uruguayan professional footballer who plays as a midfielder or striker for Kosovan club Liria.

== Career ==
In 2014, Martins signed for Uruguayan top flight side Tacuarembó from Deportivo Maldonado in the Uruguayan second division, before joining Curaçao club Scherpenheuvel.

Before the second half of 2017–18, he signed for Al Nabi Chit in Lebanon, where he suffered an injury.

Before the second half of 2018–19, Martins signed for Kosovan side Liria Prizren.
