= Marc van Eijk =

Surinamese footballer

Personal information
- Full name: Marc van Eijk
- Date of birth: 5 November 1981 (age 45)
- Place of birth: Suriname
- Height: 1.71 m (5 ft 7 in)
- Position: Forward

Senior career*
Years	Team	Apps	(Gls)
1998–2004	Heerenveen	6	(0)
2002–2003	→ Veendam (loan)	29	(3)
2004–2005	Doxa Drama		
2005	Omniworld	1	(0)
2006–2008	MSC		
2013–2014	CVV Willemstad		

International career
1996	Netherlands U15	1	(0)
1999-2000	Netherlands U19	9	(4)

Managerial career
- 2009–2011: Broekster Boys
- * Club domestic league appearances and goals

Marc van Eijk (born 5 November 1981) in Paramaribo is a Surinamese retired football player and manager.

== Club career ==
Once hailed as a big talent, Van Eijk came through the Heerenveen youth system to makes his professional debut for them in a February 1999 Eredivisie match against Willem II. After a season on loan at Eerste Divisie side Veendam he moved abroad to play for Greek outfit Doxa Drama in summer 2014.

He returned to Holland in February 2005 to train with SC Cambuur after claiming the Greek club owed him salary. He ended up playing amateur football in Holland with Omniworld, MSC and Alcides among others, and was coach of amateurs Broekster Boys before moving to Curacao to train CRKSV Jong Holland in Curaçao. He later returned to Holland and coached at Leovardia, Unitas '59, ELI and Rhode.

== International career ==
Van Eijk played 9 games for the Netherlands national under-19 football team.
