= Soto, Curaçao =

Soto
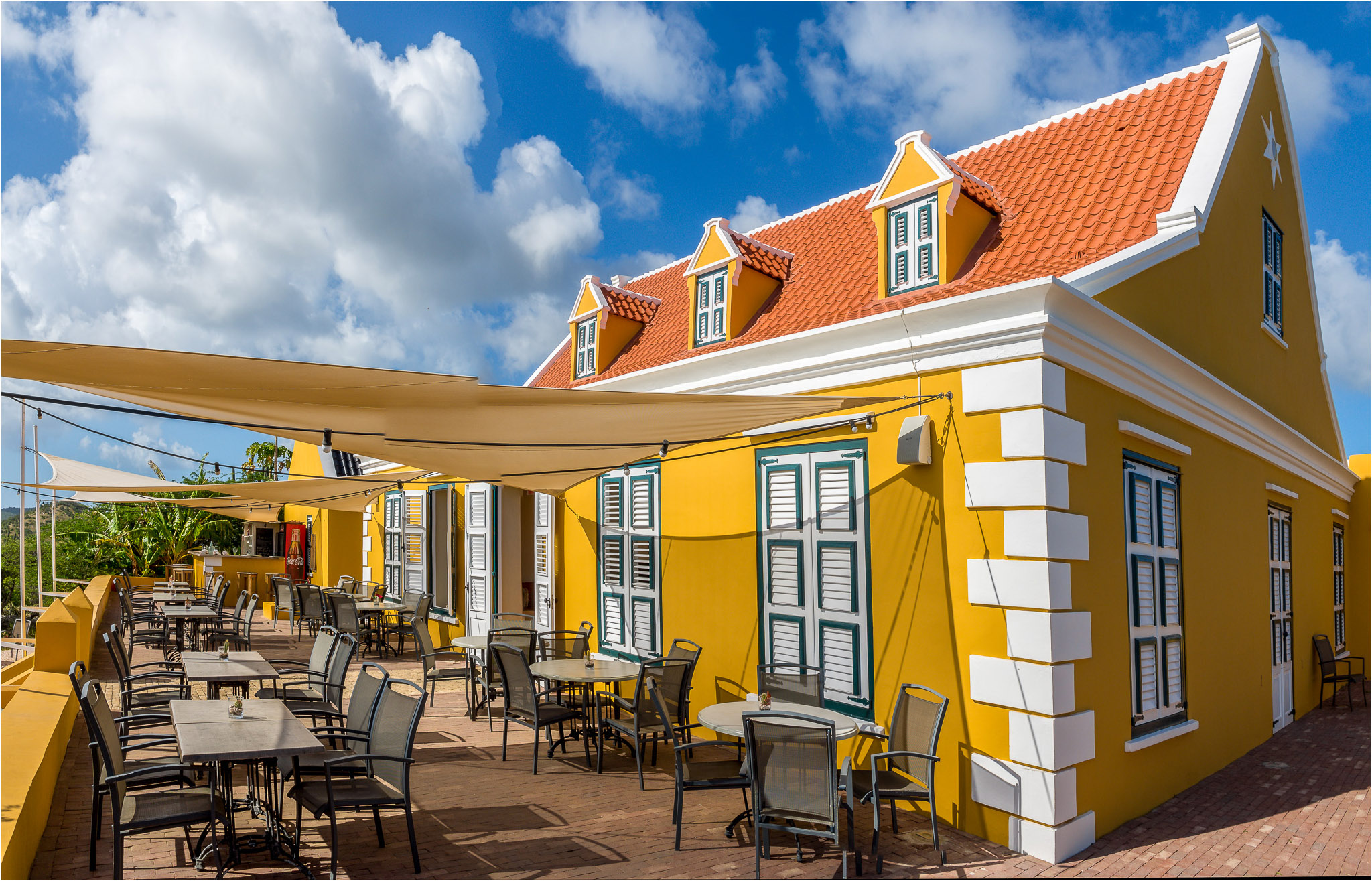
- Klein Santa Martha estate

- Location in Curaçao
- Coordinates: 12°16′N 069°06′W
- State: Kingdom of the Netherlands
- Country: Curaçao
- District: Bandabou

Area
  - Total: 18.44 km^{2} (7.12 sq mi)

Population (2011)
  - Total: 2,233
  - Density: 121.1/km^{2} (313.6/sq mi)
- Climate: BSh

Soto is a small town in northern Curaçao. It is located close to Santa Marta Bay, a deep indentation in the island's northwest coast. The small town of Santa Cruz lies just to the northwest, and the town of Barber, Curaçao lies to the northeast, across the hilly ridge which stretches for much of the island's length.

== Overview ==
The history of Soto begins with the plantations Klein Santa Martha and Groot Santa Martha. The plantations were founded before 1696, and were one of the oldest of Curaçao. After the abolition of slavery in 1863, agricultural communities were established. In 1925, a church was constructed in Soto, and a parish was established. Next to the church, a school, convent and a boarding school were built.

The population density is low, and the number of inhabitants has remained constant with a slight downwards trend. Soto is one of the poorest areas of Curaçao.

Playa Santa Martha is a public beach on the Santa Marta Bay, a lagoon with azure water. A new hotel, owned by TUI, is expected to open in 2026. From Santa Martha Bay, visitors can take boat trip to the Blue Room cave and Playa Piskado, abundant with turtles.

== Klein Santa Martha ==
Klein Santa Martha started as a sugar plantation. Around 1830, divi-divi was grown on the plantation, however it started to specialise in salt, and became one of the largest salt producer of Curaçao. In 1910, the production was 6,000 barrels. In 1937, it was purchased by the government who wanted to transform the plantation into a model farm called Helfirchdorp. The project was a failure, and the estate was abandoned. In 1995, the estate was restored to its original condition, and as of 2022, it is a boutique hotel and restaurant.

== Bibliography ==
- Buurtprofiel Soto (2011). "Buurtprofiel Soto" (PDF). Government of Curaçao (in Dutch).
