= Ludwig Alberto =

Curaçao football manager

Personal information
- Date of birth: 15 May 1962 (age 64)
- Place of birth: Netherlands Antilles

Managerial career
- Years: Team
- 2012: Curaçao U-20
- 2012–2014: Curaçao

Ludwig Alberto (born 15 May 1962) is a Curaçao professional football manager.

== Career ==
In November and December 2012 he worked with the Curaçao national under-20 football team. From March 2012 to June 2014, he was head coach of the Curaçao national football team.
