= 1990 CONCACAF Champions' Cup =

26th edition of premier club football tournament organized by CONCACAF

Tournament details
- Dates: 12 November 1990 – 12 March 1991
- Teams: 3 (from 3 associations)

Final positions
- Champions: (Mexico) América (3rd title)
- Runners-up: (Cuba) Pinar del Río

Tournament statistics
- Matches played: 52
- Goals scored: 116 (2.23 per match)

The 1990 CONCACAF Champions' Cup was the 26th edition of the annual international club football competition held in the CONCACAF region (North America, Central America and the Caribbean), the CONCACAF Champions' Cup. It determined that year's club champion of association football in the CONCACAF region and was played from 31 March 1990 till 12 March 1991.

The teams were split in three zones (North, Central and Caribbean), each one qualifying the winner to the final tournament, where the winners of the North and Central zones played a semi-final to decide who was going to play against the Caribbean champion in the final.

Mexican club América easily defeat Cuban side Pinar del Río 8–2 on aggregate, winning their third CONCACAF trophy.

== North American Zone ==
=== First round ===
28 April 1990

St. Petersburg Kickers (United States)	2–0	(United States) New York Greek American

13 May 1990

New York Greek American (United States)	1–0	(United States) St. Petersburg Kickers

Metropolitan Oval, New York City, United States
- St. Petersburg Kickers advanced to second round.

=== Second round ===
9 October 1990

St. Petersburg Kickers (United States)	0–1	(Mexico) América
		35' dos Santos

Pepin-Rood Stadium, Tampa, United States
- Played over one leg. América advanced to the CONCACAF Final Series.

== Central American Zone ==
=== First round ===
Torneo Centroamericano de Concacaf 1990

Team 1	Agg.	Team 2	1st leg	2nd leg
**Suchitepéquez** (Guatemala)	3–1	(Belize) San Joaquin F.C.	2–1	1–0
**Municipal** (Guatemala)	5–0	(Belize) Duurly's	2–0	3–0
**Luis Ángel Firpo** (El Salvador)	4–1	(Panama) Tauro	1–1	3–0
Deportivo La Previsora (Panama)	1–12	(El Salvador) **Alianza**	1–10	0–2
**Real España** (Honduras)	7–1	(Nicaragua) Diriangén	5–1	2 – 0*
Juventus (Belize)	0–4*	(Honduras) **Olimpia**	w/o	w/o

- All clubs in BOLD advance to the second round.

**Suchitepéquez (Guatemala)**	**2–1**	**(Belize) San Joaquín F.C.**	Suchitepéquez, Guatemala
			Stadium: Estadio Carlos Salazar Hijo

**San Joaquín F.C. (Belize)**	**0–1** (**0–3** agg.)	**(Guatemala) Suchitepéquez**	San Ignacio, Belize
			Stadium: Norman Broaster Stadium

**Municipal (Guatemala)**	**2–0**	**(Belize) Duurly's**	Guatemala City, Guatemala
Juan Manuel Funes			Stadium: Estadio Doroteo Guamuch Flores

**Duurly's (Belize)**	**0–3** (**0–5** agg.)	**(Guatemala) Municipal**	Belize City, Belize
		Goal	Stadium: MCC Grounds

**Tauro (Panama)**	**1–1**	**(El Salvador) Luis Ángel Firpo**	Usulután, El Salvador
Goal		José Maria Batres	Stadium: Estadio Sergio Torres

**Luis Ángel Firpo (El Salvador)**	**3–0** (**4–1** agg.)	**(Panama) Tauro**	Usulután, El Salvador
José María Batres; Toninho Dos Santos; Osmel Zapata			Stadium: Estadio Sergio Torres

**Deportivo La Previsora (Panama)**	**1–10**	**(El Salvador) Alianza**	Panama City, Panama
Goal		Joaquín Kin Canales; Jorge Joaquín Salazar; Raúl Toro	Stadium: Estadio Rommel Fernández

**Alianza (El Salvador)**	**2–0** (**1–12** agg.)	**(Panama) Deportivo La Previsora**	San Salvador, El Salvador
Julio Amílcar Palacios Lozano; Raúl Toro			Stadium: Estadio Cuscatlán

**Real España (Honduras)**	**5–1**	**(Nicaragua) Diriangén**	San Pedro Sula, Honduras
Geovanny Ávila; Carlos Caballero; Nahamán González; Emilson Soto; Luis Vallejo		Goal	Stadium: Estadio Francisco Morazán

**Diriangén (Nicaragua)**	**0–2*** (**1–7** agg.)	**(Honduras) Real España**	Diriamba, Guatemala
			Stadium: Estadio Colegio La Salle
Note: Diriangen withdrew, Real Espana were awarded a 2–0 win.

**Juventus (Belize)**	**2–0***	**(Honduras) Olimpia**
	w/o
Note: Both matches awarded 2–0 to Olimpia by forfeit Juventus

**Olimpia (Honduras)**	**2–0*** (**4–0** agg.)	**(Belize) Juventus**
	w/o
Note: Both matches awarded 2–0 to Olimpia by forfeit Juventus

=== Second round ===
Team 1	Agg.	Team 2	1st leg	2nd leg
Alianza (El Salvador)	0–1	(El Salvador) **Luis Ángel Firpo**	0–0	0–1
**Real España** (Honduras)	3–1	(Guatemala) Municipal	2–1	1–0
**Olimpia** (Honduras)	4–2	(Guatemala) Suchitepéquez	2–2	2–0

- Luis Ángel Firpo, Real C.D. España and C.D. Olimpia advance to the third round.

**Alianza (El Salvador)**	**0–0**	**(El Salvador) Luis Ángel Firpo**	San Salvador, El Salvador
			Stadium: Estadio Cuscatlán

**Luis Ángel Firpo (El Salvador)**	**1–0** (**1–0** agg.)	**(El Salvador) Alianza**	Usulután, El Salvador
Mauricio Cienfuegos			Stadium: Estadio Sergio Torres

**Municipal (Guatemala)**	**1–2**	**(Honduras) Real España**	San Pedro Sula, Honduras
TBD		Karl Roland; Luis Vallejo	Stadium: Estadio Francisco Morazán; Attendance: 3,301

September 3, 1990	**Real España (Honduras)**	**1–0** (**3–1** agg.)	**(Guatemala) Municipal**	San Pedro Sula, Honduras
	Marco Antonio Anariba			Stadium: Estadio Francisco Morazán; Attendance: 6,469

August 31, 1990	**Olimpia (Honduras)**	**2–2**	**(Guatemala) Suchitepéquez**	Tegucigalpa, Honduras
	Nahún Espinoza; Gilberto Yearwood		Byron Pérez	Stadium: Estadio Nacional Chelato Uclés

September 3, 1990	**Suchitepéquez (Guatemala)**	**0–2** (**2–4** agg.)	**(Honduras) Olimpia**	Tegucigalpa, Honduras
			Carlos Laje Moreno	Stadium: Estadio Nacional Chelato Uclés; Attendance: 11,085

=== Third round ===
Pos	Team	Pld	W	D	L	GF	GA	GD	Pts	Qualification
1	(Honduras) Olimpia	4	2	1	1	4	5	−1	**5**	CONCACAF Final Series
2	(El Salvador) Luis Ángel Firpo	4	1	2	1	5	3	+2	**4**	
3	(Honduras) Real España	4	1	1	2	5	6	−1	**3**	

Updated to match(es) played on unknown. Source:

Team 1	Score	Team 2
Luis Ángel Firpo (El Salvador)	3–0	(Honduras) Real España
Real España (Honduras)	1–1	(El Salvador) Luis Ángel Firpo
Olimpia (Honduras)	1–1	(El Salvador) Luis Ángel Firpo
Luis Ángel Firpo (El Salvador)	0–1	(Honduras) Olimpia
Real España (Honduras)	4–1	(Honduras) Olimpia
Olimpia (Honduras)	1–0	(Honduras) Real España

- Olimpia advance to the CONCACAF Semifinal Series.

1990 Round 4	**Olimpia (Honduras)**	**1–1**	**(El Salvador) Luis Ángel Firpo**	Tegucigalpa, Honduras
(UTC−06:00)	Carlos Laje Moreno		Tonhino Dos Santos	Stadium: Estadio Nacional Chelato Uclés; Attendance: 22,231

1990 Round 1	**Luis Ángel Firpo (El Salvador)**	**2–1**	**(Honduras) Olimpia**	Usulután, El Salvador
(UTC−06:00)	Raúl Díaz Arce; Edgar Henríquez		TBD	Stadium: Estadio Sergio Torres

1990 Round 1	**Real España (Honduras)**	**1–1**	**(El Salvador) Luis Ángel Firpo**	Tegucigalpa, Honduras
(UTC−06:00)	Richardson Smith		Fernando De Moura	Stadium: Estadio Francisco Morazán; Attendance: 6,217

1990 Round 1	**Luis Ángel Firpo (El Salvador)**	**3–0**	**(Honduras) Real España**	Usulután, El Salvador
(UTC−06:00)	Edgar Henríquez; Tohino Dos Santos			Stadium: Estadio Sergio Torres

11 October 1990	**Real España (Honduras)**	**4–1**	**(Honduras) Olimpia**	Tegucigalpa, Honduras
	Luis Vallejo; José Luis Aguirre; Ramón Maradiaga		Carlos Laje	Stadium: Estadio Francisco Morazán

14 October 1990	**Olimpia (Honduras)**	**1–0**	**(Honduras) Real España**	Tegucigalpa, Honduras
	Carlos Laje			Stadium: Estadio Francisco Morazán

== Caribbean Zone ==
=== Preliminary round ===
Team 1	Agg.	Team 2	1st leg	2nd leg
Zénith (Guadeloupe)	3–1	(Guadeloupe) La Gauloise	1–1	2 – 0

- Zénith advance to the first round.

**Zénith (Guadeloupe)**	**1–1**	**(Guadeloupe) La Gauloise**

**La Gauloise (Guadeloupe)**	**0–2** (**1–3** agg.)	**(Guadeloupe) Zénith**
Nil

=== First round ===
Team 1	Agg.	Team 2	1st leg	2nd leg
**Pinar del Río** (Cuba)	4–1	(Cuba) Deportivo Central	3–1	1 – 0
Seba United (Jamaica)	0–3	(Haiti) **FICA**	0–2	0 – 1
UNDEBA (Netherlands Antilles)	2–3	(Netherlands Antilles) **Sithoc**	2–1	0 – 2
**Excelsior** (Martinique)	w/o*	(Martinique) RC Rivière-Pilote		
Robinhood (Suriname)	1–2	(Suriname) **Transvaal**	0–0	1 – 2
**Paradise** (Barbados)	3–1	(Guadeloupe) Zénith	2–0	1 – 1

- Apparently RC Rivière-Pilote withdrew.*
- All clubs in BOLD advance to the second round.

**Pinar del Río (Cuba)**	**3–1**	**(Cuba) Deportivo Central**

**Deportivo Central (Cuba)**	**0–1** (**1–4** agg.)	**(Cuba) Pinar del Río**
Nil

**Seba United (Jamaica)**	**0–2**	**(Haiti) FICA**
Nil

**FICA (Haiti)**	**1–0** (**3–0** agg.)	**(Jamaica) Seba United**
		Nil

**UNDEBA (Netherlands Antilles)**	**2–1**	**(Netherlands Antilles) Sithoc**

**Sithoc (Netherlands Antilles)**	**2–0** (**3–2** agg.)	**(Netherlands Antilles) UNDEBA**
		Nil

**Robinhood (Suriname)**	**0–0**	**(Suriname) Transvaal**
Nil		Nil

**Transvaal (Suriname)**	**2–1** (**2–1** agg.)	**(Suriname) Robinhood**

**Paradise (Barbados)**	**2–0**	**(Guadeloupe) Zénith**
		Nil

**Zénith (Guadeloupe)**	**1–1** (**1–3** agg.)	**(Barbados) Paradise**

=== Second round ===
Team 1	Agg.	Team 2	1st leg	2nd leg
FICA (Haiti)	1–4	(Cuba) **Pinar del Río**	1–1	0 – 3
Paradise (Barbados)	0–2	(Suriname) **Transvaal**	0–2	
Sithoc (Netherlands Antilles)	1–6	(Martinique) **Excelsior**	0–4	1 – 2

- Results unknown after second round, but Excelsior and Transvaal were eliminated
  and Pinar del Río, advance to the CONCACAF Semifinal Series.

(Cuba) Pinar del Río – (qualified)
(Suriname) Transvaal – (Eliminated)
(Martinique) Excelsior – (Eliminated)

September 4, 1990	**FICA (Haiti)**	**1–1**	**(Cuba) Pinar del Río**	Haiti
	Lucian Duclos		Raimundo Garcia	Stadium: Parc Saint-Victor; Attendance: 7,500

**Pinar del Río (Cuba)**	**3–0** (**4–1** agg.)	**(Haiti) FICA**
		Nil

**Paradise (Barbados)**	**0–2** (**0–2** agg.)	**(Suriname) Transvaal**
Nil

**Sithoc (Netherlands Antilles)**	**0–4**	**(Martinique) Excelsior**
Nil

**Excelsior (Martinique)**	**2–1** (**6–1** agg.)	**(Netherlands Antilles) Sithoc**

== Semi-finals ==
1st leg: Nov. 12, 1990 at San Jose, California – (USA)
2nd leg: Nov. 14, 1990 at Santa Ana, California – (USA)

Team 1	Agg.	Team 2	1st leg	2nd leg
América (Mexico)	4–2	(Honduras) Olimpia	3–0	1–2
Pinar del Río (Cuba)	bye			

América (Mexico)	3–0	(Honduras) Olimpia
		Nil

Olimpia (Honduras)	2–1 (2–4 agg.)	(Mexico) América

== Final ==
=== First ===
1990 CONCACAF Champions' Cup Final
February 19, 1991
First leg

Pinar del Río (Cuba)	2–2	(Mexico) América
Alonso 20'; Hernández 43'		Huerta 25'; Toninho 31'

La Bombonera, Pinar del Río
Referee: Ramesh Ramdhan (Trinidad and Tobago)

=== Second leg ===
March 12, 1991
Second leg

América (Mexico)	6–0	(Cuba) Pinar del Río
Toninho 3', 9', 84'; Zague 68', 80'; Hernández 85' (o.g.)	Report

Estadio Azteca, Mexico City
Referee: Majid Jay (USA)

Team details

América
Pinar del Río

GK	12	(Mexico) Alejandro García	(substituted off) 45'
DF	2	(Mexico) Juan Hernández	(substituted off) 68'
DF		(Mexico) Enrique Rodón
DF	3	(Mexico) Alfredo Tena
DF	6	(Uruguay) Cesilio de los Santos
MF		(Mexico) Cristóbal Ortega
MF		(Mexico) Alejandro Domínguez
MF	7	(Mexico) Gonzalo Farfán
MF		(Mexico) Efraín Munguía
FW	9	(Brazil) Toninho
FW	17	(Mexico) Zague
Substitutions:
GK	1	(Mexico) Adrián Chávez	(substituted on) 45'
DF		(Mexico) Guillermo Huerta	(substituted on) 68'
Manager:
(Uruguay) Carlos Miloc

GK	(Cuba) Martínez
DF	(Cuba) Torres	(substituted off) 74'
DF	(Cuba) Cata
DF	(Cuba) Sainz
DF	(Cuba) Lázaro Reyes
MF	(Cuba) Lázaro Dalcourt
MF	(Cuba) Pérez	(substituted off) 60'
FW	(Cuba) Osvaldo Alonso
FW	(Cuba) Raimundo García
FW	(Cuba) Mezquía
FW	(Cuba) Osmin Hernández
Substitutions:
	(Cuba) Rivera	(substituted on) 60'
	(Cuba) C. Torres	(substituted on) 74'
Manager:
?

América won 3–1 on points (8–2 on aggregate).

== Champion ==
CONCACAF Champions' Cup
1990 Winners
(Mexico)
Club América
Third title
