= Racing Club Curaçao =

R.C.C.
- Full name: Sport Vereniging Racing Club Curaçao
- Founded: 25 August 1926; 98 years ago
- Ground: Angolaweg #3, Willemstad, Curaçao

S.V. Racing Club Curaçao is a Curaçaoan tennis club located in Willemstad. The club is a multi purpose sports club with its association football team having won the Curaçao League First Division in the 1936–37 season.

== Honours ==
Official trophies (recognized by CONCACAF and FIFA)

=== National ===
- Curaçao League First Division (1):

1936–37
