= Lennox Mauris =

Dutch Antillean footballer

Personal information
- Date of birth: 20 January 1977 (age 49)
- Position: Defender

Senior career*
Years	Team	Apps	(Gls)
2003–2007	K Bocholter VV		
2007–2009	Türkiyemspor		
2009–2009	Haaglandia		
2009–2009	DHC Delft		
2009–2010	Haaglandia		

International career^{‡}
2002–2004	Netherlands Antilles	4	(0)
- * Club domestic league appearances and goals as of 1 April 2012 ‡ National team caps and goals as of 1 April 2012

Lennox Mauris (born 20 January 1977) is an international footballer from the former Netherlands Antilles. He has played club football in Belgium for K Bocholter VV and in the Netherlands for Türkiyemspor and Haaglandia.
