= Liberta SC =

Sports club in Antigua and Barbuda

- Full name: Liberta Sports Club
- Nickname: Blackhawks
- Founded: 1991
- Ground: Antigua Recreation Ground; Kennedy's Sports Complex, Liberta
- League: Second Division (III)
- 2024–25: ▼14 th in First Division (II)
- Website: libertasportsclub.com

Liberta Sports Club is an Antiguan multi-sports club located in Liberta, Antigua and Barbuda. The club was founded in 1991.

== Teams ==
=== Cricket ===
The sports club sponsors a cricket team.

=== Football ===
The sports club sponsors a football team. The team plays at the Antigua Recreation Ground in St. John's. The team won the 2018–19 Antigua and Barbuda Premier Division, making it their first league championship, and earning a berth into the 2020 Caribbean Club Shield.

== Notable players ==
- Taj Charles
