= Barber, Curaçao =

Barber
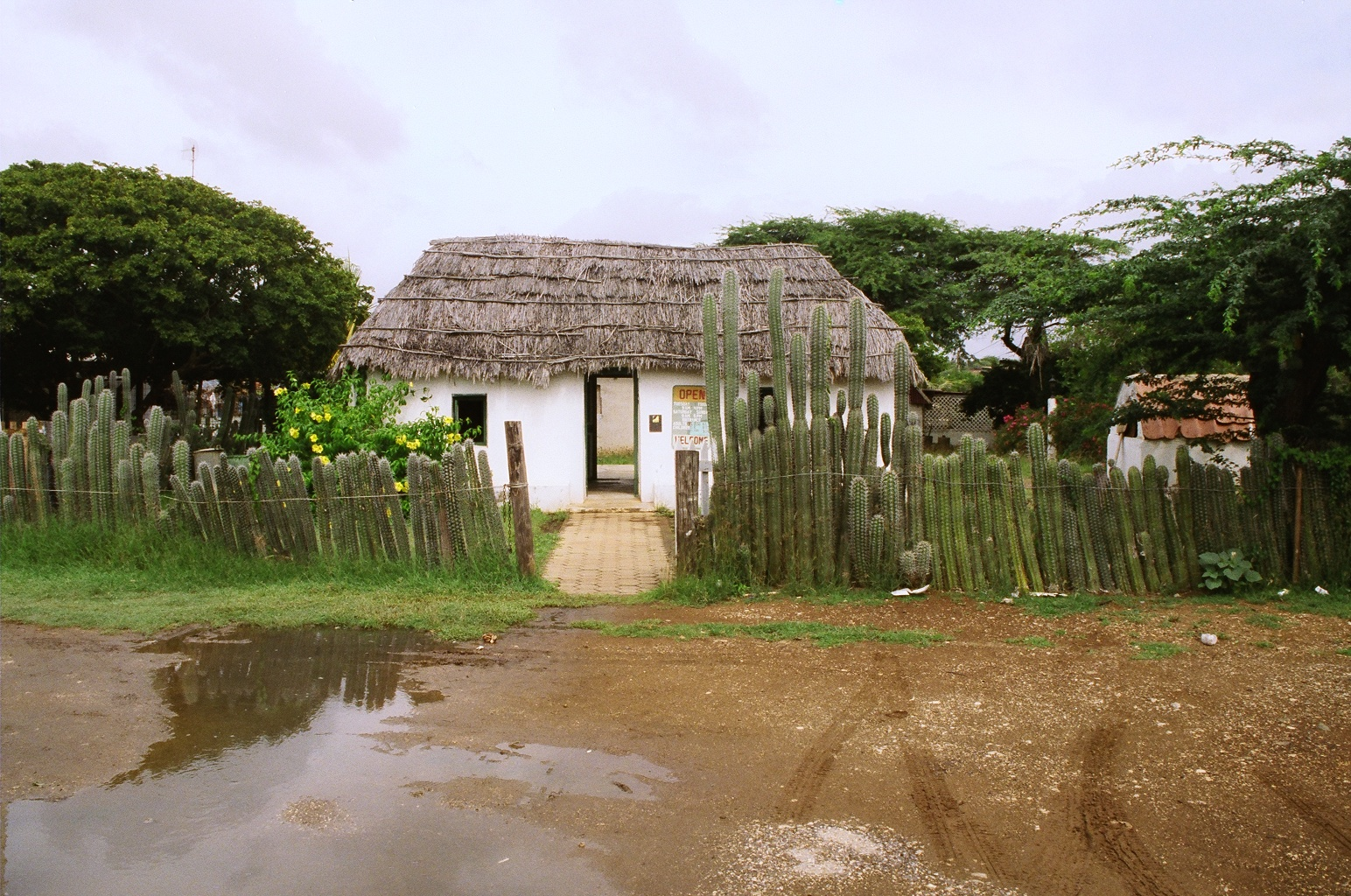
- Slave house at the Kas di Pal'i Maishi museum

- Location in Curaçao
- Coordinates: 12.2884°N 69.0764°W
- State: Kingdom of the Netherlands
- Country: Curaçao
- District: Bandabou

Area
  - Total: 9.01 km^{2} (3.48 sq mi)

Population (2011)
  - Total: 2,412
  - Density: 268/km^{2} (693/sq mi)
- Climate: BSh

Barber is a town in the north of the island of Curaçao. It is located inland from the north coast, to the southeast of Christoffelberg, at a major road junction. To the north lies the smaller settlement of San Hyronimo, and to the west lie Santa Cruz and Soto. The small settlement of Ascencion lies just to the east. In Barber there is a slavery museum and small nature park with the oldest tree in Curaçao.

== History ==
Barber started as plantation Barber. The plantation was named after Barbara Exteen In 1827, a church was built on Barber. In 1832, the plantation was sold to the Roman Catholic Church. Barber quickly developed into the main town of the area. In 1913, the plantation was bought by the Government who divided the grounds into pieces of two hectares which people could rent.

== Overview ==
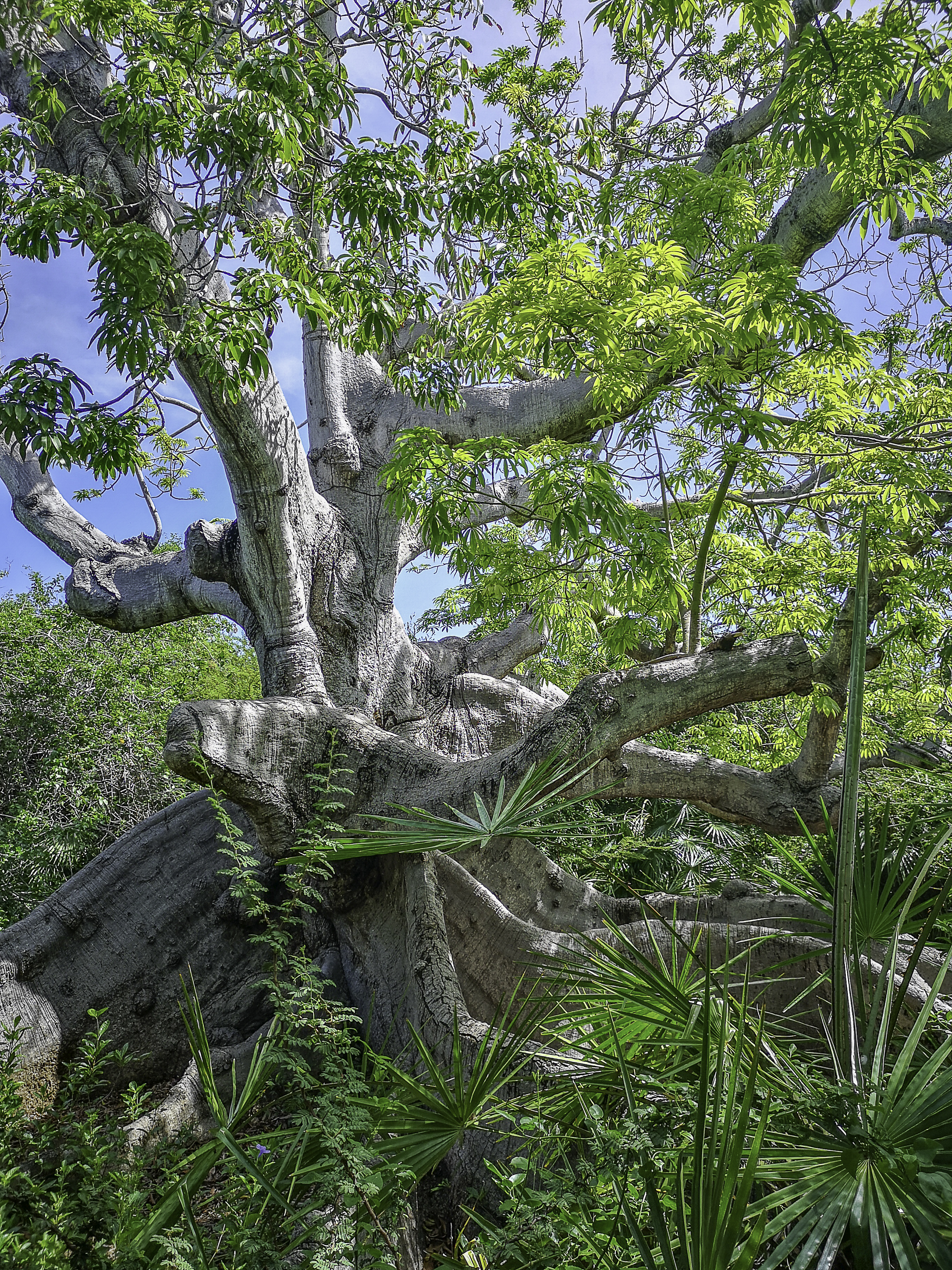
The silk cotton tree

The main sights of Barber include the oldest tree in Curaçao, a Ceiba pentandra or silk cotton tree. It is claimed by some to be 800 years old, which could make it the oldest silk cotton tree in the world. Barber hosts a Sunday market, where local vendors sell delicacies such as stomach soup and a local form of pasties.

Kas di Pal'i Maishi is an open air museum about the living conditions of the slaves.

The Hofi Pastor Nature Reserve (literally: Priests' Orchard) is a small nature park located on the edge of Barber. It used to be a forest owned by the priests of the Dominican Order who donated the land to Amigu di Terra (the Curaçao division of Friends of the Earth). In 1996, it opened as a botanical garden with only native flora and fauna. There are two walking trails in the park which will take you along the oldest tree.

== Sports ==
The local football club since 1951 is Centro Social Deportivo Barber who play at Stadion dr. Antoine Maduro in Willemstad.

== Bibliography ==
- Buurtprofiel Barber (2011). "Buurtprofiel Barber" (PDF). Government of Curaçao (in Dutch).
