= Netherlands Antilles Championship =

Netherlands Antilles Championship or Kopa Antiano was the premier association football competition in the Netherlands Antilles, overseen by the Nederlands Antilliaanse Voetbal Unie.

The championship was contested by the top teams of the Curaçao League and the Bonaire League. Up to and including 1985, the top clubs from Aruba also entered in this championship. The last tournament was played in 2010 due to the dissolution of the Netherlands Antilles.

== Netherlands Antilles Championship - 2007/08 ==
- C.S.D. Barber (CUR)
- UNDEBA (CUR)
- SV Juventus (BON)
- Real Rincon (BON)

== Previous winners ==
- 1961 : RKSV SITHOC (CUR)
- 1962 : RKSV SITHOC (CUR)
- 1963-64 : not known
- 1965 : RCA (ARU)
- 1966 : CRKSV Jong Colombia (CUR)
- 1967 : RKSV Scherpenheuvel (CUR)
- 1968 : CRKSV Jong Colombia (CUR)
- 1969 : S.V. SUBT (CUR)
- 1970 : Estrella (ARU)
- 1971-72 : not known
- 1973 : CRKSV Jong Colombia (CUR)
- 1974 : CRKSV Jong Colombia (CUR)
- 1975-76 : not known
- 1977 : CRKSV Jong Holland (CUR)
- 1978 : CRKSV Jong Colombia (CUR)
- 1979 : not known
- 1980 : S.V. SUBT (CUR)
- 1982-84 : not known
- 1985 : UNDEBA (CUR)
- 1986 : not known
- 1987 : UNDEBA (CUR)
- 1988-89 : not known
- 1989-90 : UNDEBA (CUR)
- 1991-92 : not known
- 1992-93 : RKSV SITHOC (CUR)
- 1994-95 : not known
- 1996-97 : UNDEBA (CUR)
- 1997 : CRKSV Jong Colombia (CUR)
- 1998-99 : RKSV SITHOC (CUR)
- 2000-01 : CRKSV Jong Colombia (CUR)
- 2001-02 : C.S.D. Barber (CUR)
- 2002-03 : C.S.D. Barber (CUR)
- 2003-04 : C.S.D. Barber (CUR)
- 2004-05 : C.S.D. Barber (CUR)
- 2005-06 : C.S.D. Barber (CUR)
- 2006-07 : C.S.D. Barber (CUR)
- 2007-08 : C.S.D. Barber (CUR)
- 2008-09 : S.V. Hubentut Fortuna (CUR)
- 2009-10 : C.S.D. Barber (CUR)

== Performance by club ==
| Club | City | Titles | Last title |
|---|---|---|---|
| C.S.D. Barber | Barber, Curaçao (Curaçao) | 8 | 2010 |
| CRKSV Jong Colombia | Boca Samí (Curaçao) | 7 | 2001 |
| RKSV SITHOC | Mahuma (Curaçao) | 4 | 1999 |
| UNDEBA | Banda Abou (Curaçao) | 4 | 1997 |
| S.V. SUBT | Kintjan (Curaçao) | 2 | 1980 |
| Estrella | Santa Cruz (Aruba) | 1 | 1970 |
| CRKSV Jong Holland | Willemstad (Curaçao) | 1 | 1977 |
| RKSV Scherpenheuvel | Skerpene (Curaçao) | 1 | 1967 |
| RCA | Oranjestad (Aruba) | 1 | 1965 |
| S.V. Hubentut Fortuna | Seru di Fortuna (Curaçao) | 1 | 2009 |
