= Henry Caldera (football manager) =

Curaçao football manager

Personal information
- Date of birth: 27 March 1959 (age 67)
- Place of birth: Netherlands Antilles

Managerial career
- Years: Team
- 2000: Netherlands Antilles
- 2010: Netherlands Antilles
- 2012–2013: Curaçao U17
- 2012: Curaçao U20
- 2014–: Curaçao U20

Henry Caldera (born 27 March 1959) is a Curaçao professional football manager. In 2000 and in October 2010 he coached Netherlands Antilles national football team. Since 2012 until 2013 he trained the Curaçao national under-17 football team. He is also led the Curaçao national under-20 football team from July to October 2012. Currently he working as a manager of the Curaçao national under-20 football team
