= Curaçao Promé Divishon =

Men's top division association football league in Curaçao

Promé Divishon
- Founded: 1921; 105 years ago
- Country: Curaçao
- Confederation: CONCACAF
- Number of clubs: 10
- Level on pyramid: 1
- International cup: CFU Club Shield
- Current champions: Inter Willemstad (2025–26)
- Most championships: SUBT (21 titles)
- Top scorer: Jurensley Martina (90 goals).
- Current: 2026–27 Curaçao Promé Divishon

The Promé Divishon (Papiamento: "First Division") also known as Liga MCB 1st Division for sponsorship reasons, is the top football league in Curaçao, constituent country of the Netherlands. Up to 2010 the top two teams in this competition got to compete in the Kopa Antiano, the Netherlands Antilles Championship. After its dissolution, Curaçao became a CONCACAF member, and the teams competing can qualify for the CFU Club Shield. The teams who finish at the bottom of the league table, have to compete with the top two teams of the Curaçao Segundo Divishon, the 2nd tier of football in Curaçao for placement in Promé Divishon the following season.

== Promé Divishon teams ==
Location of the clubs.
- Centro Dominguito (Dominguito, Willemstad)
- CSD Barber (Barber)
- Inter Willemstad (Willemstad)
- Jong Holland (Willemstad)
- Scherpenheuvel (Skerpene, Willemstad)
- SUBT (Willemstad)
- UNDEBA (Banda'bou)
- VESTA (Willemstad)
- Victory Boys (Noord Zapateer, Willemstad)
- Sithoc (Willemstad)

== History ==
The league was created back in 1921. For the 1974–75 season it was renamed to Sekshon Pagá and changed to an autumn/spring season cycle. From 1959 up to 2009–10 the champion played a final for the Netherlands Antilles Championship, in which mostly the Curaçao champion won.

== Previous winners ==
Previous winners are:

- 1921: CVV Sparta
- 1921–22: MVC Juliana
- 1922–23: CVV Sparta
- 1924–25: CVV Sparta
- 1925–26: CRKSV Jong Holland
- 1926–27: Dutch Football Club
- 1928: CRKSV Jong Holland
- 1929: SOV Asiento
- 1930: SOV Asiento
- 1931: CVV Volharding
- 1932: CRKSV Jong Holland
- 1933: VV Transvaal
- 1934–35: SOV Asiento
- 1935–36: CRKSV Jong Holland
- 1936–37: SV Racing Club Curaçao
- 1937–38: CRKSV Jong Holland
- 1938–39: SV SUBT
- 1939–40: CRKSV Jong Holland
- 1940–42: SV SUBT
- 1942–43: Sportclub Independiente
- 1943–44: CRKSV Jong Holland
- 1944–46: SV SUBT
- 1946–47: SV SUBT
- 1947–48: SV SUBT
- 1948–49: not held
- 1949–50: CRKSV Jong Holland
- 1950: SV SUBT
- 1951: SV SUBT
- 1952: CRKSV Jong Holland
- 1953–54: SV SUBT
- 1954–55: SV SUBT
- 1955–56: SV SUBT
- 1956: SV SUBT
- 1957: not held
- 1958–59: SV SUBT
- 1959–60: CRKSV Jong Holland
- 1960–61: RKVFC Sithoc (Mahuma)
- 1961–62: RKVFC Sithoc (Mahuma)
- 1962–63: FC Veendam
- 1963–64: CRKSV Jong Colombia (Boca Samí)
- 1964–65: RKSV Scherpenheuvel
- 1965–66: CRKSV Jong Colombia (Boca Samí)
- 1966–67: CRKSV Jong Colombia (Boca Samí)
- 1967–68: CRKSV Jong Colombia (Boca Samí)
- 1968–69: RKSV Scherpenheuvel
- 1969–70: CRKSV Jong Colombia (Boca Samí)
- 1970–71: not held
- 1971–72: SV SUBT
- 1973: CRKSV Jong Colombia (Boca Samí)

=== Sekshon Pagá ===
- 1974–75: CRKSV Jong Colombia (Boca Samí)
- 1975–76: SV SUBT
- 1976–77: CRKSV Jong Holland
- 1977–78: SV SUBT
- 1978–79: CRKSV Jong Colombia (Boca Samí)
- 1979–80: SV SUBT
- 1980: SV SUBT
- 1981: CRKSV Jong Holland
- 1982: SV SUBT
- 1983: SV SUBT
- 1984: SV SUBT
- 1985: SV SUBT
- 1986: RKVFC Sithoc (Mahuma)
- 1987: RKSVC Dominguito
- 1988: CRKSV Jong Colombia (Boca Samí)
- 1989: RKVFC Sithoc (Mahuma)
- 1990–91: RKVFC Sithoc (Mahuma)
- 1991: RKVFC Sithoc (Mahuma)
- 1992: RKVFC Sithoc (Mahuma)
- 1993: RKVFC Sithoc (Mahuma)
- 1994: CRKSV Jong Colombia (Boca Samí)
- 1995–96: RKVFC Sithoc (Mahuma)
- 1996: UNDEBA
- 1997: UNDEBA
- 1998–99: CRKSV Jong Holland
- 2000: CRKSV Jong Colombia (Boca Samí)
- 2001–02: CSD Barber
- 2002–03: CSD Barber
- 2003–04: CSD Barber
- 2004–05: CSD Barber
- 2005–06: UNDEBA
- 2006–07: CSD Barber
- 2007–08: UNDEBA
- 2009: SV Hubentut Fortuna
- 2009–10: SV Hubentut Fortuna
- 2010–11: SV Hubentut Fortuna
- 2012: RKSV Centro Dominguito
- 2013: RKSV Centro Dominguito
- 2014: CSD Barber
- 2015: RKSV Centro Dominguito

=== Promé Divishon ===
- 2016: RKSV Centro Dominguito
- 2017: RKSV Centro Dominguito
- 2017–18: CRKSV Jong Holland
- 2018–19: S.V. Vesta
- 2019–20: RKSV Scherpenheuvel
- 2021: CRKSV Jong Holland
- 2022: CRKSV Jong Holland
- 2023: abandoned
- 2024: not held
- 2025–26: Inter Willemstad

== Performance ==
Team	City	Titles	Last title
SV SUBT	Willemstad (Curaçao)	21	1985
CRKSV Jong Holland	Willemstad (Curaçao)	15	2022
CRKSV Jong Colombia	Boka Sami (Curaçao)	11	2000
RKVFC Sithoc	Willemstad (Curaçao)	9	1995–96
CSD Barber	Barber (Curaçao)	6	2014
RKSV Centro Dominguito	Willemstad (Curaçao)	6	2017
UNDEBA	Banda Abou (Curaçao)	4	2007–08
SV Hubentut Fortuna	Seru Fortuna (Curaçao)	3	2010–11
CVV Sparta	Willemstad (Curaçao)	3	1924–25
SOV Asiento	Willemstad (Curaçao)	3	1934–35
RKSV Scherpenheuvel	Skerpene (Curaçao)	3	2019–2020
MVC Juliana	Willemstad (Curaçao)	1	1921–22
Dutch Football Club	Willemstad (Curaçao)	1	1926–27
CVV Volharding	Willemstad (Curaçao)	1	1931
VV Transvaal	Willemstad (Curaçao)	1	1933
Sportclub Independiente	Willemstad (Curaçao)	1	1942–43
SV Racing Club Curaçao	Willemstad (Curaçao)	1	1936–37
FC Veendam	Willemstad (Curaçao)	1	1962–63
S.V. Vesta	Willemstad (Curaçao)	1	2018–19
C.V.V. Inter Willemstad	Willemstad (Curaçao)	1	2025–26

== Individual statistics ==
=== Top goalscorers ===
Season	Player	Team	Goals
2017–18	(Curaçao) Jurensley Martina	Jong Holland	14
2018–19	(Uruguay) Nicolas Rocha	Scherpenheuvel	15
2019–20	(Curaçao) Randel Winklaar	Centro Dominguito	18
2020-21	(Curaçao) Rudrick Pop	Willemstad	16
2021-22	(Curaçao) Jurensley Martina	Jong Holland	15
2022-23	(Curaçao) Ivanny Calvenhoven	Centro Dominguito	12
2025–26	(Curaçao) Davidson Rosa	Jong Holland	31

Most goals by a player in a single season

- 31 goals.
  - Davidson Rosa (2025–26).

Most goals by a player in a single game

- 6 goals.
  - Davidson Rosa (2025–26).

=== Multiple hat-tricks ===
Rank	Country	Player	Hat-tricks
1	(Curaçao)	Davidson Rosa	4
2	(Curaçao)	Edgar Cassiani	3
2	(Curaçao)	Lisandro Trenidad	3
4	(Curaçao)	Gersinio Constancia	2
4	(Curaçao)	Charles Martina	2
4	(Curaçao)	Randel Winklaar	2
7	(Curaçao)	Joanny Calvenhoven	1
7	(Curaçao)	Maximiliano Ciarniell	1
7	(Curaçao)	Mirko Colina Jr	1
7	(Curaçao)	Jonathan Font	1
7	(Bonaire)	Christopher Isenia	1
7	(Curaçao)	Tyronne María	1
7	(Curaçao)	Jurensley Martina	1

Most multiple hat-tricks by a player in a single season

- 3 hat-tricks:
  - Davidson Rosa (2025-26).

== Damas Senior ==
Season	Player	Team	Goals
2018	Samantha Statia	Hubentut Fortuna	9
2019-20	Taisha Hansen	Vesta	11
2025-26	Kadisha Martina	Victory Boys	14
