= RKV FC Sithoc =

Association football club in Curaçao

RKV F.C. SITHOC
- Full name: Rooms Katholieke Vereniging Football Club Sithoc
- Founded: 1942
- Ground: Ergilio Hato Stadium; Willemstad, Curaçao
- Capacity: 10,000
- Chairman: Hubert Isenia
- Manager: Ruvenly Kirindongo
- League: Curaçao League First Division
Home colours	Away colours

RKV F.C. Sithoc is a football club based in Willemstad, Curaçao, that competes in Curaçao League. It was founded on March 7, 1942.

== Achievements ==
- Netherlands Antilles Championship: 9

1960, 1961, 1962, 1990, 1991, 1992, 1993, 1995, 1999

- Curaçao League: 9

1960, 1961, 1986, 1989, 1990, 1991, 1992, 1993, 1995

== Performance in CONCACAF competitions ==
- CFU Club Championship: 1 appearance

CFU Club Championship 2000 – First Round In Group stage – (Caribbean Zone) – hosted by Joe Public in Trinidad and Tobago.

- CONCACAF Champions' Cup: 8 appearances

CONCACAF Champions' Cup 1962 – Semi-Finals – Lost to (Guatemala) CSD Comunicaciones 3 – 1 in the global result.
CONCACAF Champions' Cup 1963 – First Round – (Caribbean Zone) – Lost to (Haiti) Racing CH 4 – 1 in the global result.
CONCACAF Champions' Cup 1981 – Third Round – (Caribbean Zone) – Lost to (Suriname) SV Robinhood 5 – 1 in the global result.
CONCACAF Champions' Cup 1990 – Second Round – (Caribbean Zone) – Lost to (Martinique) Excelsior 6 – 1 in the global result.
CONCACAF Champions' Cup 1991 – First Round – (Caribbean Zone) – Lost to (Haiti) AS Capoise 4 – 3 in the global result.
CONCACAF Champions' Cup 1992 – Third Round – (Caribbean Zone) – Lost to (Martinique) Aiglon du Lamentin 3 – 3 (2–4 pen).
CONCACAF Champions' Cup 1993 – Second Round – (Caribbean Zone) – Lost to (Suriname) SV Robinhood 4 – 2 in the global result.
CONCACAF Champions' Cup 1994 – Second Round – (Caribbean Zone) – Lost to (Saint Kitts and Nevis) Newtown United 3 – 0 in the global result.
