= CRKSV Jong Colombia =

- Full name: Christelijk Rooms Katholiek Sport Vereiniging Jong Colombia
- Nicknames: The Boka Sami Orguyan; The Sharks of Boka Sami
- Founded: 23 July 1951
- Ground: Ergilio Hato Stadium; Willemstad, Curaçao
- Capacity: 10,000
- Chairman: Elston Constancia
- League: Curaçao League
Home colours	Away colours

CRKSV Jong Colombia is a professional football club in Curaçao, playing in the country's first division Curaçao League. Located in Boka Sami Municipality Sint Michiel It was founded on 23 July 1951. Its name and its crest is a reference to Colombia, located 1045.8 km from the island.

== Overview ==
The side topped the league in 1998, 2000 and 2001 as well as finishing second in the 2005–06 season behind CSD Barber. The club is based in the town of Boca Sami. They have an old rivalry with CRKSV Jong Holland based in the capital of Curaçao; Willemstad. They play in Maroon and Yellow. Former players include; Rocky Siberie who currently plays in Italy for fourth division side ASD Pro Settimo & Eureka and Netherlands Antilles national football team, Nuelson Wau who also plays for the national team but plies his trade in the Netherlands for Willem II of the first division. The club also produced one of the countries most prolific goalscorers in powerhouse Brutil Hosé who played for Sarawak FA in Malaysia.

== Generation 1979 ==
The CRKSV Jong Colombia has participated 10 times in the CONCACAF Champions League (1968, 1969, 1973, 1974, 1976, 1979, 1980, 1989, 1992 and 1994), reaching the final of the latter in 1967 and 1979. The golden generation of CRKSV Jong Colombia was the 1979.

1979 CONCACAF Champions Final Starting Lineup
- (Netherlands Antilles) Carlos Bernardina (GK)
- (Netherlands Antilles) Wilbert Zimmerman (DF)
- (Netherlands Antilles) Elsio Constancia (DF)
- (Netherlands Antilles) Rudolf Zimmerman (DF)
- (Netherlands Antilles) Huber Martina (DF)
- (Netherlands Antilles) Alberto Humbler (MF)
- (Netherlands Antilles) Héctor Zimmerman (MF)
- (Netherlands Antilles) Julio Constancia (MF)
- (Netherlands Antilles) Guillermo Zimmerman (MF)
- (Netherlands Antilles) Edwin Bernardina (FW)
- (Netherlands Antilles) Frank Victoria (FW)

== CONCACAF Champions League 1979 ==
- First Round

Team 1	Agg.	Team 2	1st leg	2nd leg
Santos FC (Jamaica)	0–4	(Netherlands Antilles) CRKSV Jong Colombia	0–2	0 – 2

- Second Round

Team 1	Agg.	Team 2	1st leg	2nd leg
SV Leo Victor (Suriname)	2–3	(Netherlands Antilles) CRKSV Jong Colombia	2–0	0 – 3

- Third Round

Team 1	Agg.	Team 2	1st leg	2nd leg
Defence Force FC (Trinidad and Tobago)	2–3	(Netherlands Antilles) CRKSV Jong Colombia	2–0	0 – 3

- Fourth Round

Team 1	Agg.	Team 2	1st leg	2nd leg
SV Robinhood (Suriname)	0–1	(Netherlands Antilles) CRKSV Jong Colombia	0–0	0 – 1

- Final

Team 1	Agg.	Team 2	1st leg	2nd leg
CRKSV Jong Colombia (Netherlands Antilles)	2–8	(El Salvador) CD FAS	1–1	1 – 7

== Honours ==
- Netherlands Antilles Championship
  - Winners (12): 1966, 1968, 1971, 1972, 1973, 1974, 1975, 1978, 1988, 1994, 1997, 2001
- Curaçao League
  - Winners (12): 1963, 1965, 1966, 1967, 1969, 1972, 1973, 1975, 1978, 1988, 1994, 2000

== Performance in CONCACAF competitions ==
- CFU Club Championship: 4 appearances

CFU Club Championship 2001 – Second Round – group stage (Caribbean Zone) hosted by (Haiti) Racing Club Haïtien
CFU Club Championship 2004 – Second Round – Lost to (Jamaica) Arnett Gardens 13 – 1 on aggregate
CFU Club Championship 2005 – Quarter-Finals – Lost to (Jamaica) Portmore United FC 10 – 0 on aggregate
CFU Club Championship 2007 – First Round – group stage (Caribbean Zone) hosted by Pointe-à-Pierre in Trinidad and Tobago

- CONCACAF Champions' Cup: 10 appearances

CONCACAF Champions' Cup 1967 – 2nd Place – Lost to (El Salvador) CD Águila 5 – 3 on aggregate.
CONCACAF Champions' Cup 1969 – First Round – Lost to (El Salvador) Alianza FC 5 – 3 on aggregate.
CONCACAF Champions' Cup 1973 – Third Round – (Caribbean Zone) – Lost to (Suriname (Kingdom of the Netherlands)) SV Transvaal 4 – 2 on aggregate.
CONCACAF Champions' Cup 1974 – Second Round – (Caribbean Zone) – Lost to (Suriname (Kingdom of the Netherlands)) SV Transvaal 5 – 3 on aggregate.
CONCACAF Champions' Cup 1976 – First Round – (Caribbean Zone) – Lost to (Suriname) SV Robinhood 4 – 2 on aggregate.
CONCACAF Champions' Cup 1979 – 2nd Place – Lost to (El Salvador) CD FAS 8 – 2 on aggregate.
CONCACAF Champions' Cup 1980 – Second Round – (Caribbean Zone) – Lost to (Suriname) SV Transvaal 5 – 0 on aggregate.
CONCACAF Champions' Cup 1989 – First Round Group stage – hosted by FC Pinar del Río in Cuba
CONCACAF Champions' Cup 1992 – First Round – (Caribbean Zone) – Lost to (Trinidad and Tobago) Mayaro United 4 – 2 on aggregate.
CONCACAF Champions' Cup 1994 – Fourth Round – (Caribbean Zone) – Lost to (Martinique) US Robert 3 – 2 on aggregate.

== In CONCACAF Champions League 1967 ==
- Caribbean Zone Qualifying

Group Stage

Team	Pld	W	D	L	GF	GA	GD	Pts
(Netherlands Antilles) CRKSV Jong Colombia	4	3	1	0	10	1	+9	7
(Trinidad and Tobago) Regiment (TRI)	4	2	1	1	5	7	−2	5
(Jamaica) Regiment (JAM)	4	2	0	2	5	6	−1	4
(Bermuda) Somerset Trojans	4	1	0	3	8	8	0	2
(Haiti) Racing Club Haïtien	4	1	0	3	3	9	−6	2

- All matches played in Kingston, Jamaica.
- CRKSV Jong Colombia wins group stage, advances to the Final.
- CONCACAF Final
17 March 1968

CRKSV Jong Colombia (Netherlands Antilles)	2–1	(El Salvador) Alianza
	Report

Willemstad, Netherlands Antilles
19 March 1968

Alianza (El Salvador)	3–0	(Netherlands Antilles) CRKSV Jong Colombia
	Report

San Salvador, El Salvador

== Notable former players ==
- Shanon Carmelia
- Brutil Hosé
- Rocky Siberie
- Nuelson Wau
