= Stadion dr. Antoine Maduro =

Stadium in Willemstad, Curaçao

Coordinates: 12.1001°N 68.9064°W

- "SUBT Stadion"
- Interactive map of Stadion dr. Antoine Maduro
- Full name: Stadion dr. Antoine Maduro
- Location: Vesuviusstraat, Willemstad, Curaçao
- Capacity: 7,000
- Field size: 125 x 80 m

Construction
- Renovated: 2013

Stadion dr. Antoine Maduro is a multi-use stadium in Willemstad, Curaçao. It is currently used mostly for football matches and is the home stadium of S.V. SUBT. It has a capacity of 7,000 spectators. It is located on Vesuviusstraat, a road off Dr. Martin Luther King Boulevard, to the south of the main harbor in Willemstad.

== See also ==
- S.V. S.U.B.T.
