= C.V.V. Inter Willemstad =

C.V.V. Willemstad
- Full name: Curaçaose Voetbal Vereniging Inter Willemstad
- Nickname: Groen Wit Bazuin (Green White Trumpet)
- Founded: 1939
- Ground: Bramendiweg Sportpark
- Capacity: 1,000
- Chairman: Lysander Marchena
- Manager: Selwin Balentien
- League: Curaçao Sekshon Pagá
Home colours	Away colours

C.V.V. Inter Willemstad, commonly known as Willemstad, is a professional football club of Curaçao, based in Willemstad. It was founded in 1939 and played in the League of Curaçao and the Netherlands Antilles Championship.

== History ==
The club was founded in 1939 by employees of the KLM airline company, who were refused as members of SOV, the sports association of the Shell refinery. This association was only open to employees of Shell.

Soon the name of the Football Association of Willemstad Curaçao invented. Membership was not restricted to KLM employees. – On April 28, 1939, CVV Willemstad was officially founded. The club joined the Football Union of Curaçao in the Second Division. The first game was against FC Sharp and was lost 1–0. A year later, the team won the first prize.

The annual report of 1945 shows that at the end of World War II, many members moved to the Netherlands, to help rebuild the country.

In 1948, Willemstad membership reached 100. In 1950 the club moved to its present site in Bramendiweg. In 1951 the club reached up to the first division.

In 2016, CVV Willemstad won both matches against Jong Colombia, the nr 10 of 2016's Liga MCB First Division with a score of 1–0 on November 3 & 7, 2016 to promote to the first division Curaçao Sekshon Pagá. Vailyson Lake scored the all-important goal of the second match in the '61 minute.

== Honours ==
=== National ===
- Sekshon Amatùr (2): 2001–02, 2015–16

== Home stadiums ==
- Ergilio Hato Stadium (Willemstad)
