= CRKSV Jong Holland =

- Full name: Curaçaose Rooms Katholieke Sport Vereiniging Jong Holland
- Nickname: The Trikolor
- Founded: July 15, 1919; 103 years ago
- Ground: Ergilio Hato Stadium; Willemstad, Curaçao
- Capacity: 10,000
- Chairman: Etienne Rosario
- Manager: Lennox Mauris
- League: Liga MCB
Home colours	Away colours	Third colours

CRKSV Jong Holland is a Curaçao professional football team based in Willemstad and playing in the First Division of Curaçao Liga MCB. Jong Holland is among the most popular football clubs from Curaçao. Some of their home games take place in front of hundreds of spectators.

== Achievements ==
- Netherlands Antilles Championship: 1

1977

- Curaçao League: 12

1926, 1928, 1932, 1935, 1937, 1940, 1943, 1981, 1999, 2018, 2021, 2022

== Performance in CONCACAF competitions ==
- CONCACAF Champions' Cup: 3 appearances

CONCACAF Champions Cup 1978 – First Round – (Caribbean Zone) – Lost to (Suriname) SV Transvaal 4 – 2 in the global result.
CONCACAF Champions Cup 1979 – Second Round – (Caribbean Zone) – Lost to (Trinidad and Tobago) Defence Force 2 – 0 in the global result.
CONCACAF Champions Cup 1985 – Third Round – (Caribbean Zone) – Lost to (French Guiana) USL Montjoly 4 – 0 in the global result.

== Current squad 2021–22 ==
Squad as of 2022 Caribbean Club Shield

Note: Flags indicate national team as defined under FIFA eligibility rules; some limited exceptions apply. Players may hold more than one non-FIFA nationality.

No.	Pos.	Nation	Player
-	GK	CUW	Kevin Juliana
-	GK	CUW	Nathaniel Meyer
-	GK	COL	Julián Gaviria
1	GK	NED	Marc van Ansem
28	GK	CUW	Gino Costina
-	DF	CUW	Fernando Zimmerman
-	DF	CUW	Rensley Celestina
-	DF	CUW	Dannick Koeiman
-	DF	COL	Alejandro Cardona
-	DF	CUW	Leannick Mercelina
3	DF	CUW	Leannick Mercelina
4	DF	HAI	Kentz Suly
14	DF	CUW	Nagriel Roch
16	DF	CUW	Bryan Anastatia
22	DF	CUW	Ethelbert Daal
-	MF	CUW	Gersinio Constansia
-	MF	COL	Julián Sánchez

No.	Pos.	Nation	Player
—	MF	CUW	Jared Tyrol
7	MF	CUW	Shurwendel Roosje
5	MF	CUW	Danel Rosa
15	MF	NED	George de Brito
-	FW	CUW	Mirco Colina
-	FW	CUW	Randel Winklaar
-	FW	CUW	Harley Djaoen
-	FW	CUW	Nathan López
-	FW	CUW	Dwaylon Maria
-	FW	CUW	Jursly Kroonstadt
-	FW	JAM	Kemoy Reid
6	FW	HAI	Gaspard Jean Baptiste
9	FW	CUW	Davidson Rosa
10	FW	CUW	Jurensley Martina
11	FW	CUW	Shardison Clarissa
19	FW	CUW	Edriel Maria
24	FW	CUW	Bjorn Fidanque

== International friendly matches ==
- 7 October 1941 – CRKSV Jong Holland 2 – 1 (Netherlands) Feyenoord
- 24 December 1944 – CRKSV Jong Holland 4 – 4 (Venezuela) Litoral OSP
- 27 December 1944 – CRKSV Jong Holland 1 – 3 Deportivo Venezuela
- 29 December 1944 – CRKSV Jong Holland 3 – 2 Deportivo Venezuela
- 7 December 1968 – CRKSV Jong Holland 4 – 1 (Venezuela) Caracas FC
- 25 October 1980 – CRKSV Jong Holland 0 – 0 (Venezuela) Deportivo Galicia
- 27 October 1980 – CRKSV Jong Holland 0 – 1 (Venezuela) Deportivo Galicia
- 25 October 1981 – CRKSV Jong Holland 2 – 4 (Venezuela) Zamora FC
- 27 October 1981 – CRKSV Jong Holland 2 – 2 (Venezuela) Zamora FC

== Managers ==
- (Curaçao) Henry Caldera (2012–13)
- (Suriname) Marc van Eijk (2013–14)
- (Curaçao) Lennox Mauris (2014–present)
