= SV Hubentut Fortuna =

Netherlands Antilles football team

Hubentut Fortuna
- Full name: Sport Voetbal Hubentut Fortuna
- Nickname(s): SERU
- Founded: 1 March 1994; 31 years ago
- Ground: Stadion Ergilio Hato, Curaçao
- Capacity: 15,000
- Chairman: Jaime Francisco
- League: Sekshon Pagá
| Home colours | Away colours |

SV Hubentut Fortuna is a professional football club based in Curacao. The club is based in the town of Seru Fortuna, north of Willemstad, and plays in the first division of the Curaçao League.

== Overview ==
The side topped the league in 2010 Curaçao League Final as well as in 2009 and also finishing third in the 2007–08 season behind CSD Barber.

== Achievements ==
- Netherlands Antilles Championship: 1
  - 2009
- Curaçao League: 3
  - 2009, 2010, 2011

== Performance in CONCACAF competitions ==
- CFU Club Championship: 2 appearances 2010, 2012

CFU Club Championship 2010 – First Round group stage – (Caribbean Zone) – hosted by (Curaçao) CSD Barber in Netherlands Antilles.
CFU Club Championship 2012 – First Round group stage – (Caribbean Zone) – hosted by Alpha United in Guyana.

== International friendly matches ==
- May 21, 2010 – SV Hubentut Fortuna vs (Netherlands) AFC Ajax, 0–3
