= Union Deportivo Banda Abou =

UNDEBA
- Full name: Union Deportivo Banda Abou
- Nickname(s): UNDEBA
- Founded: May 18, 1974; 50 years ago
- Ground: Stadion dr. Antoine Maduro
- Capacity: 7,000
- President: (Curaçao) Urvin J. Rijnschot
- Manager: (Curaçao) Mark Muzo
- League: Curaçao Promé Divishon
- Website: http://www.undeba.org/
Home colours	Away colours

Union Deportivo Banda Abou is a professional football club in Curaçao, representing the west side of the island Banda Abou. The club is playing in the Curaçao Promé Divishon.

== Achievements ==
Kopa Antiyano – Netherlands Antilles Championship – N.A.V.U. (Nederlands Antilliaanse Voetbal Unie)
Winners : 1985, 1987, 1989–90, 1996
Runner-up : 2006

Sekshon Futbòl Pagá (S.F.P.) – Curaçao League – F.F.K. (Federashon Futbòl Kòrsou)
Winners : 1996, 1997, 2005–06, 2007–08
Runner-up : 1982, 1985, 1987, 1989

Kopa Gobernador – Governor Cup – F.F.K. (Federashon Futbòl Kòrsou)
Winners : 1997, 1999
Runner-up : 2001

Second Division Curaçao League (S.F.A.) – FA
Winners : 1993 – F.F.K. (Federashon Futbòl Kòrsou)
Winners : 1978 – F.F.P.C. (Federashon Futbol Profesional Corsow)

Promotion & Relegation series
section Promotion Play-offs:

F.F.K. (Federashon Futbòl Kòrsou) : 1993

section Relegation Play-offs:

F.F.K. (Federashon Futbòl Kòrsou) : 1992, 2010–11

== Performance in CONCACAF club competition ==
- CFU Club Championship: 1 appearance

CFU Club Championship 2007 – First Round group stage – (Caribbean Zone) – hosted by Waterhouse in Jamaica

- CONCACAF Champions' Cup: 3 appearances

1986 CONCACAF Champions' Cup – Second Round – (Caribbean Zone) – Lost to (Suriname) SV Transvaal 6–2 in the global result.
1988 CONCACAF Champions' Cup – First Round – (Caribbean Zone) – Lost to (Jamaica) Montego Bay United 5–2 in the global result.
1990 CONCACAF Champions' Cup – First Round – (Caribbean Zone) – Lost to (Curaçao) RKV FC Sithoc 3–2 in the global result.

== Managers ==
- (Curaçao) Gilmar Pisas (2013–14)
- (Curaçao) Henry Caldera (2014–)
- (Curaçao) Demy Rosario (2018–19)
- (Curaçao) Ingemar 'Inchi' Pieternella (2019–20)
- (Curaçao) Mark Muzo (2020–21)
