= S.V. Vesta =

- Full name: Sport Voetbal. Vriendschap Eendracht Sterken Tegen Alles
- Nickname: The Orguyan di Sta Maria
- Founded: June 30th, 1948
- Ground: Stadion dr. Antoine Maduro
- Capacity: 7,000
- Chairman: Erick Lourens
- Manager: Henry Caldera
- League: Curaçao Promé Divishon
- 2018-2019: 1st
- Website: http://www.svvesta.com/
Home colours	Away colours	Third colours

SV Vesta is a football team located in Willemstad, Curaçao, playing in the First Division of Curaçao League. The country of Curaçao was part of the Netherlands Antilles within the Dutch Kingdom until the split back in 2010.

== Awards ==
- Curaçao Promé Divishon
  - Winners (1): 2018-19

== Current squad 2016–2017 ==
Note: Flags indicate national team as defined under FIFA eligibility rules; some limited exceptions apply. Players may hold more than one non-FIFA nationality.

No.	Pos.	Nation	Player
—	GK	CUW	Gino Costina
—	GK	CUW	Raymar Revierre
—	GK	CUW	Roderick Rooijer
—	DF	CUW	Ruchendro "Chendro" Kirindongo
—	DF	CUW	Carlos Koeiman
—	DF	CUW	Jordan Kastaneer
—	DF	CUW	Jerachmeel "Jerry" Cleofa
—	DF	CUW	Claytis Hanse
—	DF	CUW	Gerson Sambo
—	DF	CUW	Eder Constancia
—	DF	CUW	Jean Carlos Arion
—	DF	CUW	Richinelo "Chinito" Francisca
—	MF	COL	Harold Vargas

No.	Pos.	Nation	Player
—	MF	CUW	Everon Espacia
—	MF	CUW	Ethelbert Daal
—	MF	CUW	Evenon "Nene" Martis
—	MF	CUW	Reginald "Reggie" Martina
—	MF	CUW	Lendel Johanes
—	FW	COL	Jose Landaeta
—	FW	CUW	Reylison Otto
—	FW	CUW	Shaidneyson "Korá" Martina
—	FW	CUW	Jursly "Pipo" Kroonstadt
—	FW	CUW	Raishelon Rosa
—	FW	CUW	Shurwendel "Pito" Roosje
—	FW	CUW	Tyronne Maria
—	FW	CUW	Mirco Colina Jr.
