= S.V. Victory Boys =

- Full name: Sport Vereniging Victory Boys
- Nickname: The Green Soldiers
- Founded: 1952; 74 years ago
- Ground: Stadion Victory Boys; Santa Rosa, Curaçao
- Capacity: 10,000
- Chairman: Hassnah Elhage
- Manager: Gershwin Felicia
- League: Sekshon Pagá
- Website: https://svvictoryboys.com
| Home colours | Away colours |

S.V. Victory Boys is a Curaçao professional football team based in Willemstad, playing in the First Division Curaçao League.

== Achievements ==
- Second Division Curacao: 2

1976, 1985

- coca cola tournament: 1

2014

== Performance in CONCACAF competition ==
- CFU Club Championship: 1 appearance

CFU Club Championship 2005 – Quarter-Finals – Lost against (Saint Lucia) Northern United All Stars 2 – 1 in the global result.
