= Sport Unie Brion Trappers =

S.U.B.T.
- Full name: Sport Unie Brion Trappers
- Founded: 17 September 1925; 100 years ago
- Ground: Stadion dr. Antoine Maduro; Willemstad, Curaçao
- Capacity: 7,000
- Chairman: Ebell Scharbaai
- Manager: Reggie Demali
- League: Curaçao League First Division
- Website: subt.cw
Home colours	Away colours

Sport Unie Brion-Trappers Kòrsou is a Curaçao professional football club based in Willemstad, their home stadium being Stadion dr. Antoine Maduro. It plays in the first division of Curaçao League.

== Achievements ==
- Netherlands Antilles Championship: 4

1969, 1980, 1983, 1984

- Curaçao League: 20

1938, 1940, 1944, 1946, 1947, 1950, 1951, 1953, 1954, 1955,1956, 1958, 1971, 1977, 1979, 1980, 1982, 1983, 1984, 1985

== Performance in CONCACAF competitions ==
- CONCACAF Champions' Cup: 8 appearances

CONCACAF Champions' Cup 1970 – First Round – (Caribbean Zone) – Lost to (Haiti) Racing CH 6 – 3 in the global result.
CONCACAF Champions' Cup 1973 – Second Round – (Caribbean Zone) – Lost to (Suriname) SV Transvaal 9 – 3 in the global result.
CONCACAF Champions' Cup 1980 – Unknown Round – (Caribbean Zone) – Lost to (Suriname) SV Robinhood 5 – 2 in the global result.
CONCACAF Champions' Cup 1981 – Second Round – (Caribbean Zone) – Lost to (Suriname) SV Transvaal 3 – 1 in the global result.
CONCACAF Champions' Cup 1983 – Third Round – (Caribbean Zone) – Lost to (Suriname) SV Robinhood 4 – 1 in the global result.
CONCACAF Champions' Cup 1984 – First Round – (Caribbean Zone) – Lost to (Guadeloupe) Cygne Noir 2 – 1 in the global result.
CONCACAF Champions' Cup 1985 – unknown results
CONCACAF Champions' Cup 1991 – First Round – (Caribbean Zone) – Lost to (Suriname) SV Transvaal 1 – 0 in the global result.
