= RKSV Scherpenheuvel =

Scherpenheuvel
- Full name: Rooms Katholieke Sport Vereniging Scherpenheuvel
- Nickname: The Pride of Skerpene
- Founded: 18 July 1960; 66 years ago
- Ground: Stadion dr. Antoine Maduro; Willemstad, Curaçao
- Capacity: 7,000
- Chairman: Tjardo Wanga
- Manager: Denzel Thodé
- League: Sekshon Pagá
Home colours	Away colours

Rooms Katholieke Sport Vereniging Scherpenheuvel is a Curaçao professional football club located in Scherpenheuvel, and playing in the Sekshon Pagá since the 2015 season. The club has previously played at the topflight of the Netherlands Antilles, having won the Curaçao League First Division twice, in both the 1964–65 and 1968–69 seasons, and the Netherlands Antilles Championship once in 1967. Participating in the 1968 CONCACAF Champions' Cup. They were eliminated by SV Transvaal from Suriname 4–2 on aggregate.

== Honours ==
- Netherlands Antilles Championship: 1

1967

- Curaçao League First Division: 3

1964–65, 1968–69, 2019–20

== Performance in CONCACAF competition ==
- CONCACAF Champions' Cup: 1 appearance

CONCACAF Champions' Cup 1968 – First Round – (Caribbean Zone) – Lost to (Suriname) SV Transvaal 4–2 in the global result.
