= Centro Social Deportivo Barber =

C.S.D. Barber
- Full name: Sport Voetbal Centro Social Deportivo Barber
- Founded: 1951
- Ground: Stadion Ergilio Hato, Willemstad, Curaçao
- Capacity: 15,000
- League: Sekshon Pagá
Home colours	Away colours	Third colours

Sport Voetbal Centro Social Deportivo Barber is a Curaçao professional football club located in the northern town of Barber, playing in the Curaçao League First Division.

== Achievements ==
- Kopa Antiano: 8

2002, 2003, 2004, 2005, 2006, 2007, 2008, 2010

- Sekshon Pagá: 6

2002, 2003, 2004, 2005, 2007, 2014

- Sekshon Amatùr: 1

1995

== Performance in CONCACAF competitions ==
- CFU Club Championship: 6 appearances 2003, 2005, 2006, 2007, 2009, 2010

2003 – first round – (Caribbean Zone) – Lost against (Jamaica) Portmore United 3–1 in the global result.
2005 – semi-finals – (Caribbean Zone) – Lost against (Jamaica) Portmore United 3–2 in the global result.
2006 – first round group stage – (Caribbean Zone) – hosted by Harbour View in Jamaica
2007 – first round group stage – (Caribbean Zone) – hosted by San Juan Jabloteh in Trinidad and Tobago
2009 – first round – (Caribbean Zone) – Lost against (Suriname) Inter Moengotapoe 3–2 in the global result.
2010 – first round group stage – (Caribbean Zone) – hosted by Hubentut Fortuna in Netherlands Antilles.
