= Ergilio Hato Stadium =

Multi-purpose stadium in Willemstad, Curaçao

Coordinates: 12°9′10″N 68°53′17″W

- SDK
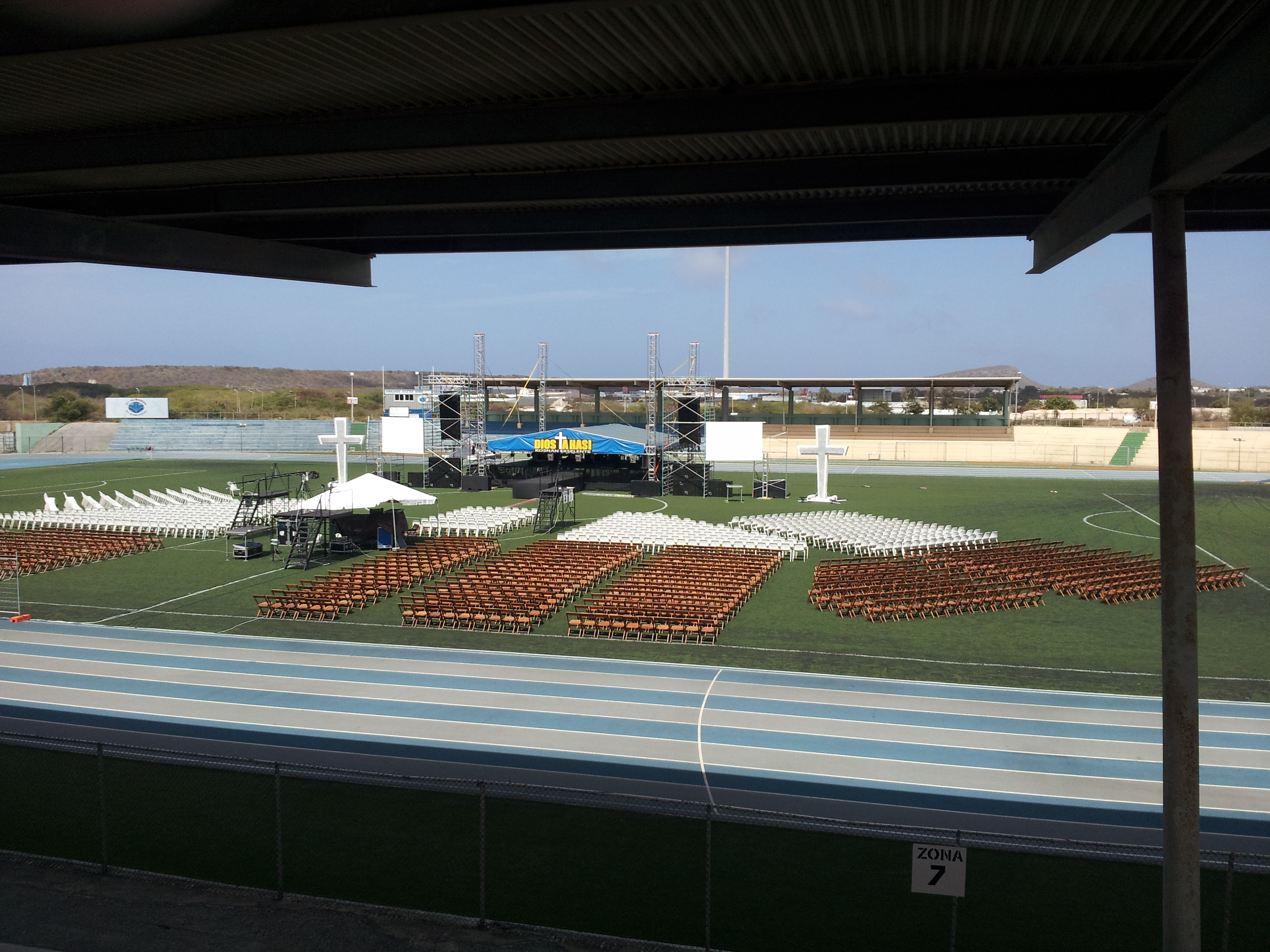
- Interactive map of Ergilio Hato Stadium
- Full name: Sentro Deportivo Korsou Ergilio Hato
- Location: Brievengat, Willemstad, Curaçao
- Capacity: 15,000
- Field size: 105 x 67 m

Construction
- Renovated: 2013

Tenants
- Curaçao national football team CRKSV Jong Holland; CRKSV Jong Colombia; RKSV Centro Dominguito; Netherlands Antilles national football team

Ergilio Hato Stadium (Dutch: Ergilio Hatostadion; Papiamentu: Stadion Ergilio Hato) is a multi-purpose stadium in Willemstad, Curaçao. It is also known as Sentro Deportivo Korsou (SDK) and is the island's largest stadium, with a capacity of 15,000 spectators. It is named after Ergilio Hato, a legendary football player from the island.

The stadium is currently used mostly for football matches, also being the home ground of the Curaçao national football team, successor of the Netherlands Antilles national football team. The clubs using the ground are CRKSV Jong Holland, CRKSV Jong Colombia and RKSV Centro Dominguito.

Originally the stadium was used as the home of the Netherlands Antilles National Team, which was disbanded when this entity disappeared in 2010.

The stadium underwent a series of renovations in 2013 to improve its infrastructure and make it more suitable for the international competitions it usually hosts. It hosted CONCACAF Nations League matches in 2019 and 2020.
