= RKSV Centro Dominguito =

- Full name: Rooms Katholieke Sport Vereiniging Centro Dominguito
- Nickname: Centro
- Founded: 1952
- Ground: Stadion Ergilio Hato, Willemstad
- Capacity: 10,000
- Chairman: Dwigno Puriel
- League: Sekshon Pagá
Home colours	Away colours

RKSV Centro Dominguito is a professional football club based in Willemstad, playing in the first division of Curaçao League.

== Honours ==
=== Official trophies (recognized by CONCACAF and FIFA) ===
==== National ====
- Sekshon Pagá (6):

1987, 2012, 2013, 2015, 2016, 2017

- Sekshon Amatùr (3):

1979, 1981, 1983

== Performance in CONCACAF competition ==
- CONCACAF Champions' Cup: 1 appearance

CONCACAF Champions' Cup 1988 – First Round – (Caribbean Zone) – Lost to (Guadeloupe) La Gauloise de Basse-Terre 3–1 in the global result.

- CFU Club Championship: 2 appearances

2014 CFU Club Championship – First Round group stage – (Caribbean Zone) – hosted by Bayamón in Puerto Rico

2018 Caribbean Club Championship Tier 2 CONCACAF Caribbean Club Shield;– hosted by Santiago in Dominican Republic
