= Chicago Lions SC =

American soccer club

Chicago Lions SC was an American soccer club based in Chicago, Illinois. The club was operated by the Ukrainian American Sports Association. The club competed professionally in the Lamar Hunt US Open Cup (National Challenge Cup) and the National Soccer League (Chicago). They were also known as the Ukrainian Lions. All their home games were played at Hansen Stadium in Chicago, Illinois. The club was founded in 1949 by Ukrainian immigrants who settled in the Chicago area after World War II. There were six Lions players that played on the US Men's National Team Nick Krat, Orest Banach, Willy Roy, Mike Noha and Stefan Szefer and Fred Kovacs. In 1975 the Chicago Sting signed Chicago Lions players Willy Roy, Ian Stone, Stefan Szefer, Mike Winter, Richard Green and Eugene Andruss for their inaugural season in the North American Soccer League. Other players that went on to play in the North American Soccer League and the American Soccer League were Nick Owcharuk with the San Diego Sockers, Leo Kulinczenko with the Los Angeles Skyhawks, Bill Mishalow with the Memphis Rogues.

== Honours ==
- National Soccer League (Chicago) Champion: 4

1952–53,1970–71,1971–72,1973–74

- Peel Cup: 1

1956

- Illinois Governors Cup: 3

1972,1974,1977

== Notable former players ==
- (United States) (Germany) Orest Banach
- (United States) (Ukraine) Nick Krat
- (United States) (Germany) Willy Roy
- (United States) (Argentina) Mike Noha

== Former players ==
- (United States) Ian Stone 1968–1976
- (Germany) Fred Kovacs 1974–1976
- (Poland) Stefan Szefer 1973–1974
- (United States) Leo Kulinczenko 1974–1976
- (United States) Bill Mishalow 1970–1974
- (United States) Nick Owcharuk 1970–1974
- (Republic of Ireland) Paul Keenan 1980–1983
- (Republic of Ireland) Terry Gallager 1980–1983
- (United States) Nick Woznij 1972–1976
- (Peru) Richard Green 1974–1975
- (United States) Mike Winter 1974–1975
- (United States) William Drozd 1980–1982
- (United States) Eugene Mishalow 1972–1976
- (Germany) Christian Kipka 1974–1976
- (United States) Nick Iwanik 1968–1976
- (United States) (Ukraine) Nick Krat 1968–1976
- (United States) (Argentina) Mike Noha 1968–1970
- (Peru) Manuel Medina 1964–1973
- (United States) George Perry 1970–1974
- (United States) Jerry Leciuk 1972–1976
- (Italy) John Gusella 1970–1976
- (Ukraine) Leo Schorohod 1968–1976
- (United States) Eugene Andruss 1973–1976
- (United States) Nick Shlapak 1974–1975
- (United States) Andrew Cozij 1968–1974
- (Brazil) Anatoly Jaworskyj 1966–1973
- (United States) Raymond Roy 1974–1977
- (Croatia) Bozo Banovic 1975–1976
- (Croatia) Ilia Pavljasevic 1975–1976
- (Ukraine) Andrew Babek 1964–1970
- (Italy) Eddie Paoli 1974–1980

== Former Managers ==
- (Ukraine) Anatoly Hordinskyj 1970–1986
- (Ukraine) Vadim Mishalow 1974–1981
- (Ukraine) Orest Klufas 1960–1970
