= Chicago Croatian =

American soccer club

- 1985 CONCACAF Champions Cup Honduras Central America. Photo from left to right top row: Coach Frank Basan, Joseph Malkoc, Yaro Dachniwsky, Leo Kulinczenko, George Rudman, Joseph Konarsky, Vlado Crnjak, Manager Joe Tadijanovic, bottom row:John Galovic, Slavko Petrina, Tony Novacio, Tony Tadijanovic, Dusko Budimir, Zygmund Tryna.
- Founded: 1949
- Dissolved: 1990
- Stadium: Hanson Stadium and Winnemac Stadium
- League: National Soccer League (Chicago)

Chicago Croatian was an American soccer club based in Chicago, Illinois. The club competed professionally in the US Open Cup, the CONCACAF Champions Cup and the National Soccer League (Chicago). All their home matches were played in Hanson Stadium and Winnemac Stadium in Chicago.

The club was founded in the 1950s and is historically the most successful Croatian soccer club in the US. The height of the Croatians success came in the 1970s and 1980s, when the team reached the final of the prestigious US Open Cup in 1974, 1979 and 1984. They qualified for the CONCACAF Champions Cup in 1975 and 1980 but withdrew from the competition. They participated in the 1985 CONCACAF Champions Cup and were knocked out of the competition in the 1st round by Honduras champions Club Deportivo Olimpia. Both legs of the match where played in Honduras: the 1st leg was played in San Pedro Sula and the 2nd leg in Tegucigalpa; the attendance was over 40,000 spectators for each match.

== Honors ==
- US Open Cup
- Finalists (3): 1974,1979,1984
- Semi-finalist : 1985
- National Soccer League (Chicago)
- Champions (2):1971,1973 : No records kept 1974 thru 1986
- Peel Cup Illinois State Cup
- Champions (4): 1973,1976,1978,1986
- Croatian-North American Soccer Tournament
- Champions (6): 1968,1975,1976,1977,1979,1986
- CONCACAF Champions Cup : Participated in 1985 (Also qualified 1975,1980, but withdrew from competition)
- 1985 1st round Honduras Central America

=== US Open Cup Results ===
- June 2, 1974 New York Greek American 2 Chicago Croatian 0
- June 17, 1979 Brooklyn Dodgers 2 Chicago Croatian 1
- June 24, 1984 New York Crete 4 Chicago Croatian 2

== Roster ==
Note: Flags indicate national team as defined under FIFA eligibility rules; some limited exceptions apply. Players may hold more than one non-FIFA nationality.

No.	Pos.	Nation	Player
1	GK	USA	Yaro Dachniwsky
2	DF	CRO	John Galovic
3	DF	USA	Leo Kulinczenko
4	DF	CRO	Vlado Crnjak
5	DF	CRO	Dusko Budimir
6	MF	CRO	Slavko Petrina
7	MF	POL	Joseph Konarsky
8	MF	CAN	Tony Novacio
9	MF	CRO	Joseph Malkoc
10	FW	USA	Tony Tadijanovic
11	FW	POL	Zygmund Tryna
12	MF	USA	Robert Herman

== Managers ==
- (Croatia) Joe Tadijanovic
- (Croatia) Frank Basan
