= Richard Green (soccer) =

American soccer player

Personal information
- Full name: Richard Felipe Green Curotto
- Date of birth: August 13, 1949 (age 77)
- Place of birth: Lima, Peru
- Height: 5 ft 11 in (1.80 m)
- Position: Midfielder

Youth career
- San Luis Gonzaga National University

Senior career*
Years	Team	Apps	(Gls)
- Octavio Espinoza de Ica
–1975	Ukrainian Lions		
1975–1976	Chicago Sting	13	(1)
1976	Chicago Cats		
- Chicago Maroons

International career
1973	United States	1	(0)
- * Club domestic league appearances and goals

Richard Green is a former soccer player who played as a defender who played professionally in Peru and the United States, including the North American Soccer League. Born in Peru, he earned one cap for the United States national team in 1973.

== Club ==
Green attended both San Vicente de Paul High School and San Luis Gonzaga High School Teams in Ica, Peru. He then attended San Luis Gonzaga National University, playing on the school's soccer team. He began his professional career with Octavio Espinoza de Ica. Green moved to the United States to play for the Ukrainian Lions, also known as the Chicago Lions, of the National Soccer League (Chicago). He also played for the Italian Maroons, also known as the Chicago Maroons. While playing for the Lions, he was spotted by Bill Foulkes, coach of the Chicago Sting. Green spent the entire 1976 season with the Sting. In 1977, he began the season with the Sting before being released and finishing it with the Chicago Cats of the American Soccer League.

== International ==
Green earned one cap with the U.S. national team in a 1–0 win over Poland on August 12, 1973. He replaced Art Martinich at halftime. Green, and most of his teammates, were from the lower American divisions after the first division North American Soccer League (NASL) refused to release players for the game.
