= Adam Wolanin =

American soccer player

Personal information
- Full name: Adam Stanislaw Wolanin
- Date of birth: November 13, 1919
- Place of birth: Lwow, Poland
- Date of death: October 26, 1987 (aged 67)
- Place of death: Park Ridge, Illinois, United States
- Position: Forward

Senior career*
Years	Team	Apps	(Gls)
1935–1939	Pogoń Lwów	29	(14)
1939–1940	Spartak Lviv		
1941	Spartak Moscow	1	(0)
- Blackpool
–1950	Chicago Maroons		
1950–?	A.A.C. Eagles		
- Chicago Falcons

International career
1950	United States	1	(0)
- * Club domestic league appearances and goals

Adam Stanislaw Wolanin (November 13, 1919 – October 26, 1987) was a soccer player who played as a forward. Born in Poland, he was a member of the United States national team at the 1950 FIFA World Cup. He is a member of the National Soccer Hall of Fame.

== Professional career ==
Wolanin began his professional career with Polish First Division club Pogoń Lwów when he was seventeen. When Germany invaded Poland, sparking World War II in September 1939, Wolanin fled to England where he played for English First Division club Blackpool. However, he never became part of the first team before moving to the United States. He eventually settled in Chicago where he played for the Maroons and A.A.C. Eagles of the National Soccer League of Chicago. In 1950, he joined the Chicago Falcons, winning the 1953 National Challenge Cup with the team.

== National team ==
In 1950, Wolanin was called up to the U.S. men's national team for the 1950 FIFA World Cup. He played in the first U.S. game of the tournament, a 3–1 loss to Spain.

Wolanin was inducted, along with the rest of the 1950 U.S. World Cup team, into the National Soccer Hall of Fame in 1976 and the Illinois Soccer Hall of Fame in 1992. He is buried in Maryhill Catholic Cemetery and Mausoleum, in Chicago, Illinois.
