= Hamilton Croatia =

Canadian soccer team

- Full name: Sports Club Croatia Hamilton
- Founded: 1957
- League: HDSL Premier Division
Home colours	Away colours

Hamilton Croatia is a Croatian Canadian amateur soccer team founded in Hamilton, Ontario, Canada in 1957. It is supported by the Croatian Sports and Community Centre of Hamilton Inc. (formerly the Croatian National Sports Club of Hamilton, Inc.).

The team plays in the Hamilton & District Premier Soccer League's Elite Division.

Hamilton Croatia also competes annually in such competitions as the Ontario Cup, various League Cups, the Hamilton Spectator Cup, and the Croatian National Soccer Federation's North American Tournament held every Labour Day weekend at sites across Canada and the United States. In 2016, Hamilton was inducted as the club of distinction into the Hamilton Soccer Hall of Fame.

In September 2011, Hamilton Croatia hosted the 48th Annual Croatian National Soccer Federation of Canada & U.S.A’s Men’s Soccer Tournament. It was widely considered the most successful tournament in recent years.

== History ==
The organization was formed in 1957 as the Sports Club Croatia Hamilton, and competed in the Inter-City League under the guidance of Stjepan Stanković. The club debuted in a match against Hamilton Sparta 2-1, with Pavle Usenica scoring the first-ever goal in club history. Throughout its history Hamilton Croatia hosted international friendly matches with Croatian club teams such as 1967 Inter-Cities Fairs Cup winners Dinamo Zagreb, NK Medjugorje, NK Croatia Brihovo, NK Vukovar '91, NK Karlovac, HSK Zrinjski Mostar, as well as Vasas Budapest SC, one of Hungary's major sports clubs.

Some notable Croatian players to have worn a Hamilton Croatia jersey were Zeljko Adzic, Slavko Cetina, Vlado Crnjak, Berislav Krilic, Stjepan Loparic, Vlado Palijan, Ivica Tankovic, Robert Prosinecki and Nediljko Simic. Notable non-Croat players included 1976 Canadian Olympians Kevin Grant and Olympic team captain Jimmy Douglas, as well as former United Soccer Leagues First Division All-Star Jamie Dodds. During this period Hamilton added several pieces of silverware to their cabinet acquiring titles like the Inter-City League title, the Hamilton Spectator Cup, and the Croatian National Soccer Federation's North American Tournament title.

In 1970, Hamilton Croatia went professional by entering the National Soccer League, where in their debut season they claimed the NSL Championship by defeating regular season champions Toronto Croatia. Throughout their six-year tenure in the NSL, Hamilton managed to achieve a successful run within the league finishing in the second, and third positions for three seasons.

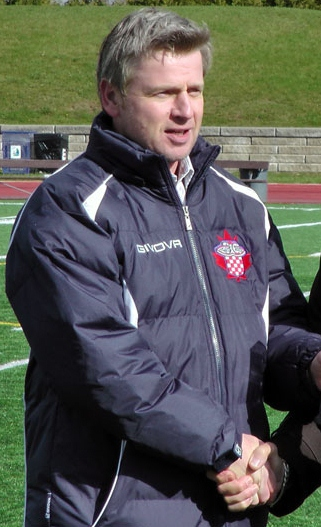
Ron Davidson led Hamilton to the CSL Championship final in 2010, and as a result was named the CSL Coach of the Year

During the 1980s and 1990s the team was coached by John Zefkić, and Zvonko Zubrinić, where the club won several championships within the Hamilton & District Premier Soccer League. Hamilton would also compete in the Ontario Soccer League, winning two division titles in 2008, and 2009, and head coach Ron Davidson winning the OSL Coach of the Year award in 2009.

=== Canadian Soccer League ===
On January 22, 2010, Hamilton Croatia was selected as one of the newly expansion franchise to compete in the Canadian Soccer League. Becoming the second professional Hamilton club to compete in the CSL, with Hamilton Thunder preceding them. The club's home venue would be Brian Timmis Stadium. OSL Coach of the Year Ron Davidson would lead the team. Davidson would sign several USL veterans like Jamie Dodds, Said Ali, and Alvin Hudson. He also brought in Ivan Razumović, Peter Tereanszki-Toth, Rhian Dodds, Preston Corporal, Antonijo Zupan, and Aidan O'Keeffe, players with international experience.

Hamilton made their debut in the CSL on May 15, 2010, in a match against TFC Academy, where they won the match by a score of 2-1. The Croatian side started off the season with a six-game undefeated streak. Hamilton would finish third in the overall standings with the best offensive record within the league. Croatia qualified for the postseason and faced TFC Academy in the quarterfinals where in the first match Hamilton won the match by a score of 2-1 with goals coming from Corporal, and Razumovic. In the second leg Hamilton finished off the series with a 1-0 victory with the lone goal coming from Liberian international Preston Corporal.

In the next round Hamilton faced rivals Toronto Croatia in a well attended match where Hamilton triumphed with a 2-0 victory advancing the club to the CSL Championship finals. In the CSL Championship finals Hamilton faced Brantford Galaxy, but lost the match to a score of 3-0. At the conclusion of the season Ron Davidson was awarded the CSL Coach of the Year award. On February 11, 2011, the club's executive board announced a parting of ways with the league due to philosophical differences with the CSL.

== Past achievements ==
1958	Tournament of Canadian-Croatian Soccer Clubs at London	Champions
1958	Southern Ontario Soccer Association	Champions
1963	Tournament of Southern Ontario Soccer Clubs	Champions
1963	Tournament of Canadian-Croatian Soccer Clubs	Champions
1963	Inter-City League	Champions
1964	Hamilton Spectator Cup	Champions
1965	2nd CNSF of Canada & USA Tournament, host Chicago Hrvat	Champions
1965	Ontario Cup	Semi-Finals
1965	Hamilton Spectator Cup	Champions
1965	Inter-City League	Champions
1967	4th CNSF of Canada & USA Tournament, host Milwaukee Orlovi	Runners-up
1969	6th CNSF of Canada & USA Tournament, host Toronto Croatia	Champions
1970	National Soccer League Playoffs	Champions
1970	National Soccer League	Runners-up
1971	8th CNSF of Canada & USA Tournament, host Chicago CBP	Runners-up
1971	National Soccer League	Third Place
1972	National Soccer League	Third Place
1975	12th CNSF of Canada & USA Tournament, host Cleveland Croatia	Runners-up
1977	14th CNSF of Canada & USA Tournament, host Chicago Hrvat	Third Place
1986	23rd CNSF of Canada & USA Tournament, host Toronto Zagreb	Third Place
1989	Hamilton & District Soccer League Cup	Champions
1990	Hamilton Spectator Cup	Runners-up
1991	Hamilton & District Soccer League Cup	Champions
1992	Hamilton & District Soccer League Cup	Champions
1993	30th CNSF of Canada & USA Tournament, host Hamilton Croatia	Runners-up
1997	Hamilton & District-Peninsula Challenge Cup	Champions
1997	South Region Cup	Champions
1997	Hamilton & District Soccer League First Division	Champions
1997	34th CNSF of Canada & USA Tournament, host Oakville Velebit	Third Place
2002	Hamilton & District Soccer League Playoffs	Champions
2002	Hamilton & District Soccer League First Division	Champions
2003	Hamilton & District Soccer League Premier Division	Runners-up
2004	Hamilton Spectator Cup	Champions
2004	Hamilton & District Soccer League Premier Division	Runners-up
2004	Hamilton & District Soccer League Playoffs	Champions
2005	Ontario Soccer League South Region	Runners-up
2005	42nd CNSF of Canada & USA Tournament, host Sudbury Adria	Third Place
2005	Hamilton Spectator Cup	Champions
2006	Ontario Soccer League South Region	Runners-up
2007	Hamilton Spectator Cup	Champions
2007	Ontario Soccer League South Region	Runners-up
2007	Ontario Cup	Semi-Finals
2008	Hamilton Spectator Cup	Runners-up
2008	Ontario Soccer League Frank Docherty Cup	Runners-up
2008	Ontario Soccer League South Region	Champions
2009	Ontario Cup	Semi-Finals
2009	Hamilton Spectator Cup	Champions
2009	Ontario Soccer League Alf Beese Cup	Champions
2009	Ontario Soccer League Provincial West Division	Champions
2010	Canadian Soccer League Regular Season	Third Place
2010	Canadian Soccer League Playoffs	Runners-up
2011	Hamilton & District Soccer League Premier Division	Runners-up
2012	Hamilton & District Soccer League Premier Division	Runners-up
2013	Hamilton & District Soccer League Premier Division	Champions
2013	Hamilton & District Soccer League Premier Division Playoffs	Champions
2013	Hamilton & District Soccer League Cup	Champions
2014	Hamilton & District Soccer League Premier Division	Champions
2014	Hamilton & District Soccer League Cup	Champions
2016	Hamilton & District Soccer League Premier Division	Champions
