= Steve Grivnow =

American soccer player, coach, and referee

Personal information
- Date of birth: February 25, 1922
- Place of birth: United States
- Date of death: November 30, 1969 (aged 47)
- Positions: Inside left; left back

Senior career*
| Years | Team | Apps | (Gls) |
| –1942 | Castle Shannon | | |
| 1942– | Gallatin | | |
| –1948 | Pittsburg Cury Vets | | |
| 1948–1949 | Castle Shannon | | |
| 1949–1953 | Harmarville Hurricanes | | |
| 1953–1956 | Castle Shannon | | |
- Bridgeville

International career
| 1948–1954 | United States | 2 | (0) |
- * Club domestic league appearances and goals

Steve Grivnow (February 25, 1922 – November 30, 1969) was an American soccer inside left, referee and coach who was a member of the 1948 United States Olympic soccer team. He also earned two caps with the United States national team.

== Club ==
In the early 1940s, Grivnow played for Castle Shannon. On October 7, 1942, he moved to Gallatin. In 1948, he scored the lone Curry Vets goal in their 4–1 loss to Ponta Delgada S.C. in the final of the 1948 National Amateur Cup. In 1949, he played for Castle Shannon. In 1952, he scored two goals in the Harmarville Hurricanes victory over the Philadelphia Nationals in the final of the 1952 National Challenge Cup. He was back with Castle Shannon by December 1953. and played for them until 1956. Although he made his name as a goal scorer, Grivow moved to the backline in the last two years of his career. During his playing career, Grivnow also coached.

== International ==
In 1948, Grivnow was selected for the United States soccer team at the Summer Olympics, but did not play in the lone United States game of the tournament, a 9–0 loss to Italy. Following the tournament, Grivnow gained his caps with the United States national team when he came on for Gino Pariani in a 5–0 loss to Northern Ireland on August 11, 1948. His second game with the national team was a 4-0 World Cup qualification loss to Mexico on January 10, 1954.

Following his retirement from playing, Grivnow became a referee in the local amateur leagues.
