= Gino Gardassanich =

American soccer player

Gino Gard
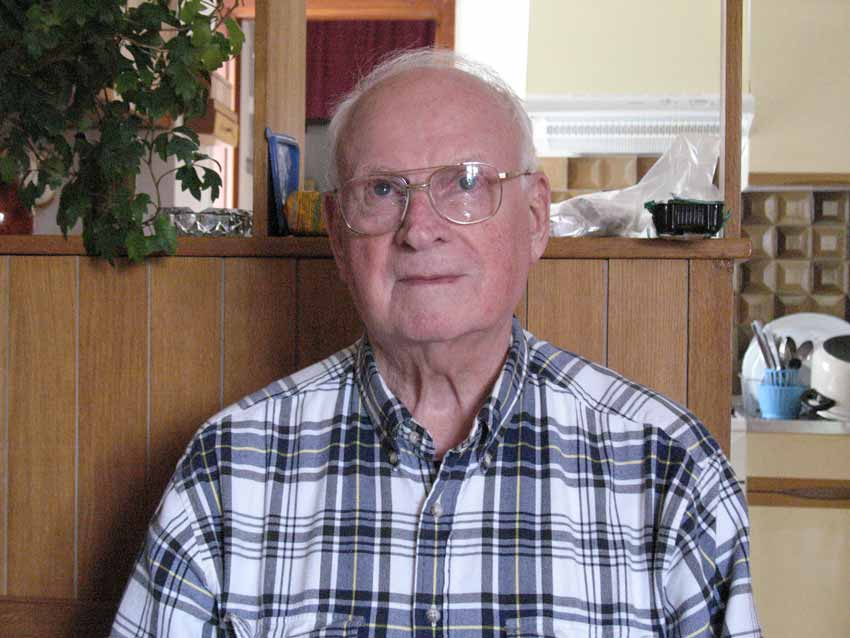

Personal information
- Full name: Gino Gard
- Date of birth: November 26, 1922
- Place of birth: Fiume, Free State of Fiume
- Date of death: February 12, 2010 (aged 87)
- Place of death: Hinsdale, Illinois, United States
- Height: 1.88 m (6 ft 2 in)
- Position: Goalkeeper

Youth career
- 1940–1941: Građanski Zagreb

Senior career*
Years	Team	Apps	(Gls)
1940–1941	Građanski Zagreb		
1941–1942	NK Orijent		
1942–1943	Magazzini Generali		
1943–1944	Todt		
1944–1945	Silurificio Whitehead		
1945–1946	Magazzini Generali		
1946–1947	Kvarner Rijeka		
1947	ACF Fiorentina	0	(0)
1947–1948	Marsala		
1948–1949	Reggina		
1949–1959	Chicago Slovak		
- * Club domestic league appearances and goals

Gino Gard, born Gino Gardassanich (Croatian: Gardašanić); (November 26, 1922 – February 12, 2010) was a soccer goalkeeper who was a member of the United States team at the 1950 FIFA World Cup. He was born in Fiume, Free State of Fiume and died in Illinois, United States.

== Club career ==
Gardassanich began his career with Fiumana and Reggina. After World War II, he played with NK Kvarner in the 1946–47 Yugoslav First League. In 1949, he moved to the United States, settling in Chicago. When he arrived, he changed his name to Gino Gard and joined Chicago Slovak of the National Soccer League of Chicago. He played with Slovak until 1959. During that time, Gard and his teammates won multiple titles, including the league title in 1951, 1952 and 1954; and the 1951 Peel Cup. In 1953, it lost the National Amateur Cup final to Ponta Delgada S.C. Gard was named the NSLC goalkeeper of the year in 1950.

== National team ==
Gard was selected to the U.S. roster for the 1950 FIFA World Cup. He was the original choice as the starting goalkeeper, but never entered a game.

Gard was inducted into the National Soccer Hall of Fame in 1976 and the Illinois Hall of Fame in 1992.

== Honors ==
Građanski Zagreb

- Independent State of Croatia Championship: 1941

Chicago Slovak

- National Soccer League of Chicago: 1951, 1952, 1954

Individual

- NSLC Goalkeeper of the Year: 1950
- National Soccer Hall of Fame: 1976
- Illinois Hall of Fame: 1992
