= 1955–56 in American soccer =

Soccer in the United States
- Season: 1955-56

The 1955–56 season was the 46th season of FIFA-sanctioned soccer in the United States.

== National team ==
=== Men's ===
Matches played between July 1955 and June 1956.

Wins	Losses	Draws
0	1	0

August 25, 1955 Friendly	Iceland	3–2	United States	Reykjavík, Iceland

== League tables ==
=== American Soccer League ===
                             G    W   T   L   GF  GA  PTS
Uhrik Truckers               16   10   4   2   48  25   24
Elizabeth Falcons            16   10   4   2   45  26   24
Ludlow Lusitano              16   10   2   4   35  17   22
Newark Portuguese            16    7   5   4   40  24   19
Brookhattan                  16    6   1   9   31  29   13
New York Americans           15    4   5   6   34  30   13
Brooklyn Hakoah              16    4   5   6   23  34   13
Brooklyn Hispano             14    2   4   8   20  34    8
Baltimore Rockets            16    1   2  13   21  77    4

== National Challenge Cup ==
The 43rd staging of the National Challenge Cup was held during the 1955–56 season. The competition began January 23, 1956, and the final leg of the championship was held on July 28, 1956. The Harmarville Hurricanes of Harmarville, Pennsylvania, won the title. It was the Hurricanes second title, and their first since 1952.

Semifinals
CA	Danish American	1	—	1
IL	Schwaben	2	—	2
PA	Harmarville Hurricanes	1	1	2
NY	New York Hakoah	0	1	1

Final
IL	Schwaben	1	0	2
PA	Harmarville Hurricanes (a.e.t.)	0	3	3
