= Bohdan Nedilsky =

American soccer player (born 1967)

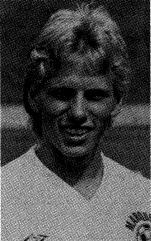
- Nedilsky with Marquette Golden Eagles, circa 1987

Personal information
- Date of birth: July 23, 1967 (age 59)
- Place of birth: Chicago, Illinois, United States
- Height: 5 ft 7 in (1.70 m)
- Positions: Midfielder; defender

Youth career
- 1977–198?: Newark Ukrainian Sitch

Senior career*
Years	Team	Apps	(Gls)
1985–1988	Marquette Golden Eagles		
- Chicago Wings SC
1991	Karpaty Lviv	14	(0)
- Chicago Wings SC
- Chicago Levy
- Newark Ukrainian Sitch

Managerial career
- Shorewood High School
- * Club domestic league appearances and goals

Bohdan Nedilsky

Information
- Information: B.A. Psychology (Marquette University), M.A. Innovative Teaching Methods (Cardinal Stritch University), PhD (School of Education and Leadership, Cardinal Stritch University)

Bohdan Nedilsky (Note: Ukrainian: Богдан Недільський, romanized: Bohdan Nedilskyi) (born 23 July 1967) is an American former professional soccer player who played as a midfielder or defender. In 1991, he played for Ukrainian club Karpaty Lviv. He also played for amateur teams Chicago Wings SC and Chicago Levy, and professional club Newark Ukrainian Sitch. Nedilsky was the head coach of the Shorewood High School boys' soccer team in Shorewood, Wisconsin. He is currently the co-founder and Instructional Director of New Horizons for Learning Charter High School for the School District of Shorewood, Wisconsin. He is married to Aubrey Saia.

== Early life ==
Nedilsky was born in Chicago, Illinois, to a family of Ukrainian immigrants who had arrived in the United States after World War II.
