= 1977 National Challenge Cup =

- Dewar Challenge Cup

Tournament details
- Country: United States

Final positions
- Champions: Maccabee Los Angeles (3rd title)
- Runners-up: Philadelphia United German–Hungarians
- 1978 CONCACAF Champions' Cup: Maccabee Los Angeles

The 1977 National Challenge Cup was the 64th edition of the USSF's annual open soccer championship. Teams from the North American Soccer League declined to participate. Maccabee Los Angeles of Los Angeles defeated the Philadelphia United German-Hungarians of Philadelphia in the final game.

== Championship ==
June 19, 1977

Maccabee Los Angeles	5–0	United German Hungarians
31' Carlos Roveri; 76' Manuel Mana; 59', 80' Abraham Cohen; 89' Meir Segal	(Report)

Jackie Robinson Field
Los Angeles, California
Attendance: 2125
Referee: Klaus Kretchmer
