= Leo Kulinczenko =

- CONCACAF Champions Cup 1985 (Tegucigalpa, Honduras)

Personal information
- Date of birth: October 3, 1954 (age 72)
- Place of birth: Chicago Illinois, U.S.
- Height: 5 ft 11 in (1.80 m)
- Position: Defender

Youth career
- 1964–1973: Ukrainian Lions

Senior career*
Years	Team	Apps	(Gls)
1974–1976	Ukrainian Lions	62	(7)
1976	Chicago Sting	0	(0)
1977–1978	Maccabee Los Angeles	72	(4)
1979	Los Angeles Skyhawks	6	(0)
1980-1983	Ukrainian Lions	48	(4)
1984–1985	Chicago Croatian	32	(3)

Managerial career
- 1998–2000: Saint Viator High School
- 2001: North Central College
- 2000–2007: Chicago Sockers
- 2007–2008: Chicago Eclipse Select
- 2009–2016: Chicago Sockers
- * Club domestic league appearances and goals

Leo Kulinczenko is a retired American/Ukrainian association football player who played professionally in the CONCACAF Champions Cup and the US Open Cup. He played in the American Soccer League, National Soccer League (Chicago) and the Greater Los Angeles Soccer League.

== Youth career ==
Kulinczenko who is of Ukrainian descent started his playing career in the youth system of the Ukrainian Lions.

== Professional career ==
In 1974 he began his career with the first team of the Ukrainian Lions. In 1976 he was invited to the Chicago Sting of the North American Soccer League training squad but then was released after three months. He played for five-time US Open Cup Champions Maccabee Los Angeles winning back to back US Open Cups in 1977 and 1978.. In 1979 he played for the Los Angeles Skyhawks of the American Soccer League. His first game with the Skyhawks was a friendly against the 1980 US Olympic team the game was played in Los Angeles. In 1980 he returned to play with the Ukrainian Lions until 1983. He played for the 1984 US Open Cup finalist Chicago Croatian in the 1985 CONCACAF Champions' Cup against Honduras champion Club Deportivo Olimpia. He retired after the 1985 season.

== International career ==
1985 CONCACAF Champions' Cup

Chicago Croatian (USA) vs Club Deportivo Olimpia (Honduras Central America)

== Coaching career ==
He held a full-time position with Chicago Sockers as a staff coach for 16 years. The Chicago Sockers is the only program in Illinois to provide the U.S. Soccer Development Academy. From 1998 to 2000 he coached the boys varsity team at Saint Viator High School. In 2001 he was assistant men's coach at North Central College.
