= Croatian Canadians =

Canadians who have Croatian ancestry

Hrvati u Kanadi, Hrvatski Kanađani or Kanadski Hrvati
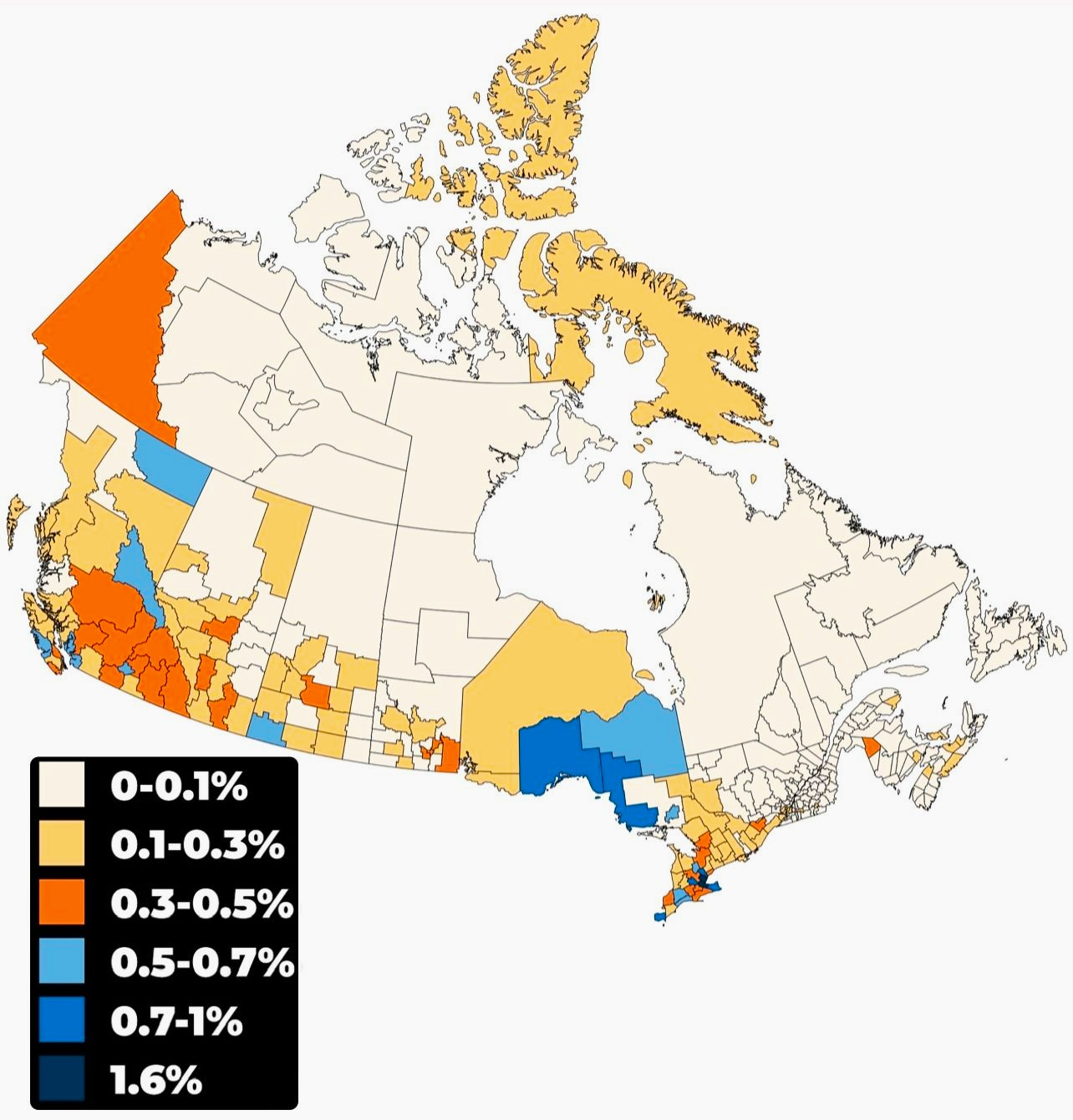
- Population distribution of Croatian Canadians by census division, 2021 census

Total population
- 200,000 (2020)

Regions with significant populations
- Toronto, Vancouver, Windsor, Montreal, Calgary, Edmonton, Hamilton, Winnipeg, Victoria, Ottawa, Waterloo Region

Languages
- Canadian English, Canadian French, Croatian

Religion
- Predominantly Roman Catholicism

Related ethnic groups
- Croatian Americans, European Canadians, Yugoslav Canadians

Croatian Canadians (French: Canadiens d'origine croate) are Canadian citizens who are of Croatian descent. The community exists in major cities including the Greater Toronto Area, Hamilton, Ottawa, Vancouver, Victoria, Calgary, Edmonton, Winnipeg, Windsor, Montreal and Waterloo Region.

Popular events celebrated in the Croatian-Canadian community include the Canadian-Croatian Folklore Festival (held both in eastern and western Canada), the Croatian-North American Soccer Tournament, North American Mladifest and annual Croatia days, organised by Croatian Cultural Centre in Vancouver.

== Geographical distribution ==
The ten largest Croatian communities are found in the following cities:

- Toronto: 13,670
- Hamilton: 10,110
- Mississauga: 9,935
- Calgary: 5,575
- Edmonton: 4,175
- Oakville: 4,045
- Vancouver: 3,890
- Ottawa: 3,540
- Burnaby: 3,225
- Kitchener: 3,000

The town with the largest percentage of people of Croatian ethnic origin is Kenaston, Saskatchewan – 17.5% of its 285 inhabitants claim Croatian ethnic origin. Statistics Canada also designates Census Metropolitan Areas in the collection of its data. The ten Census Metropolitan Areas with the highest concentration of Croatian Canadians are:

- Toronto CMA: 37,460
- Vancouver CMA: 15,670
- Hamilton CMA: 13,655
- Calgary CMA: 6,265
- Edmonton CMA: 5,265
- Montreal CMA: 5,230
- Kitchener-Cambridge-Waterloo CMA: 4,920
- Ottawa CMA: 4,135
- Windsor CMA: 3,925
- Niagara CMA: 3,225

== Demography ==
=== Population ===
There were approximately 114,880 Canadians of Croatian ethnic origin as reported in the 2011 Census compiled by Statistics Canada, rising to 133,965 by the 2016 Census. Although predominantly found in Ontario, Croatian Canadians are present in most major Canadian cities throughout the country.

=== Religion ===
Most Croatian Canadians are Roman Catholics who follow the Latin Rite of their ancestors in Croatia and Bosnia and Herzegovina. This is in line with the population in Croatia, which is also majority Catholic. A very small minority of Croatians are Byzantine Rite Roman Catholics. There is also a very small community of Croats who follow Islam, the descendants of those who converted after the 16th century, after the conquest of much of Croatia by the Ottomans. Communities of Protestants have historically been negligible in Croatia.

croatian Canadian demography by religion
Religious group	2021 (Note: Religious breakdown proportions based on "Croatian" ethnic or cultural origin response on the 2021 census.)		2001 (Note: Religious breakdown proportions based on "Croatian" ethnic or cultural origin response on the 2001 census.)	
Religious group	Pop.	%	Pop.	%
Christianity	91,315	69.8%	86,760	89.4%
Irreligion	37,815	28.91%	9,470	9.76%
Islam	515	0.39%	490	0.5%
Judaism	330	0.25%	100	0.1%
Buddhism	95	0.07%	70	0.07%
Hinduism	20	0.02%	0	0%
Indigenous spirituality	40	0.03%	35	0.04%
Sikhism	20	0.02%	20	0%
Other	660	0.5%	90	0.09%
Total Croatian Canadian population	130,820	100%	97,050	100%

Croatian Canadian demography by Christian sects
Religious group	2021		2001	
Religious group	Pop.	%	Pop.	%
Catholic	75,650	82.85%	77,025	88.78%
Orthodox	5,095	5.58%	2,745	3.16%
Protestant	5,360	5.87%	5,870	6.77%
Other Christian	5,210	5.71%	1,120	1.29%
Total Croatian Canadian christian population	91,315	100%	86,760	100%

==== Catholicism ====
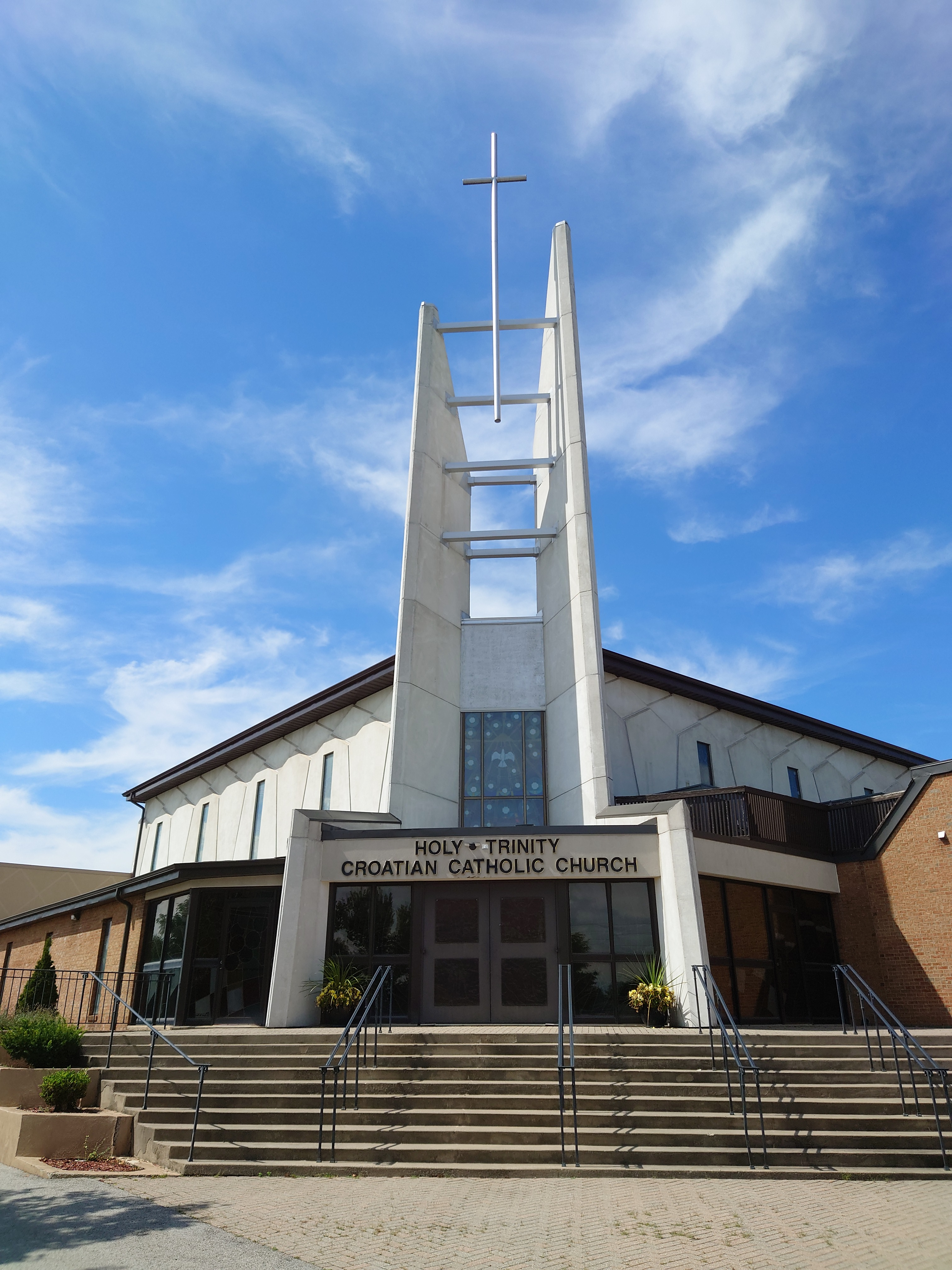
Holy Trinity Croatian Catholic Church in Oakville

In Canada, the first ethnic Croatian parish was established in Windsor in 1950. Soon, parishes were established in Toronto (1951), Hamilton (1958), Vancouver (1967), and Winnipeg (1968). On 9 September 1976, mons. Paul Reding issued a decree on establishing the Croatian Catholic parish of the Most Holy Trinity in Oakville. Today there are ethnic Croatian parishes and missions in seventeen cities in Canada. One of the most prominent Croatian Catholic parishes is the Queen of Peace Catholic Church in Norval, Ontario. The establishment of the parish began in 1976 when community members, under the guidance of the Franciscan Friars, gathered for one evening to discuss the necessity and logistics of creating a place of gathering and cultural and faith building and preservation for the large Croatian immigrant population. In May 1977, 160 acres of property were purchased by the organizing committee specifically dedicated to Croatian Catholics. In the Norval Croatian Centre, as in many other Croatian Catholic parishes, brochures, books, CDs and other forms of Croatian media are offered.

Croatian Catholic youth in particular have started and taken part in many faith developments of their own. The Croatian Catholic Youth Group (CCY) is a faith-based group that comes together by schedule to discuss Catholic subjects and strengthen their religious belief. In addition, Mladifest is an annual event started in 2013 by the Queen of Peace Parish and has each year attracted hundreds of young Catholic Croatians to further explore the intersection of their faith and culture. As the event continued to develop over the years, it began to be rotated between host parishes, with the 2013, 2014, and 2015 Mladifests being in Norval, 2016 in Sacred Heart, Milwaukee, Wisconsin, 2017 in Immaculate Heart of Mary, Vancouver, British Columbia, 2018 in Croatian Martyrs Church, Mississauga, Ontario, and 2019 in Saint Nicholas Tavelic, Montreal, Quebec. It is an event funded by each parish's members' donations and contributions to bake sales, banquets and other events held to amass funds.

==== Other Christian ====
While an overwhelming percentage of Croatians in Canada remain Roman Catholic, there are non-Catholic populations, including Protestants (most of whom have been in Canada for more than one generation) and Eastern Orthodox (the majority of whom are of mixed ethnic background).

==== Islam ====
Previously unorganized Croats of the Muslim faith, with the arrival of eminent physician Asaf Duraković, founded the Croatian Islamic Centre on 23 June 1973 in Etobicoke (75 Birmingham Street, Etobicoke, ON M8V 2C3), helped by the Croatian Catholic community. An old Catholic school was bought for 75,000 CAD and readjusted into a masjid. Since the old building was in bad condition, a new mosque was built on the site of the old one in 1983.

Today, given changing political affiliations and political pressures from the 1990s, and an influx of non-Croat, Bosnian Muslims, the center is now known as the Bosnian Islamic Centre. Despite this, today 4 out of 64 Canadian mosques have the attribute "Croatian". In Croatian Islamic Centre, children are taught the Croatian and Arabic languages, and Croatian Islamic newspapers, books, brochures, etc. are also provided. The Croatian Islamic Center has called on Muslim governments, organisations, and individuals to press the Yugoslav regime to end the persecution of Islam and to grant genuine equality to Muslims in Yugoslavia. The director of Centre Kerim Reis has asked that Belgrade release Muslim prisoners of conscience and to end restrictions on the building of mosques. During Yugoslavia, this group often accused Tito's Yugoslavia of practising discrimination against both Muslim and Catholic Croats.

== Culture ==
=== Folklore ===
The Croatian Folklore Federation of Canada (Croatian: Hrvatsko-kanadski folklorni savez) was founded in Sudbury on 27 October 1973, after it successfully organised the Folk Dance Festival. The first Canadian-Croatian Folklore Festival was organised in Sudbury in 1975, as well as the first folklore seminars. The Western-Canadian section of CFFC was established in Edmonton in the beginning of the year 1978. On 20 and 21 May 1978, CFFC West held the fourth edition of the Festival. The Western and Eastern section of the CFFC held three joint festival editions (Sudbury 1983, Winnipeg 1987 and Calgary 2000). Federation also organised three festivals in Croatia: two in Zagreb (12 and 13 July 1991 and 1997) and one in Split (10 and 11 July 2004). The Federation also organises Tamburafest, with different hosts every year (Jadran Toronto in 2017, KUD Vukovar in 2018, FEC Mississauga in 2019, Vatroslav Lisinski – Mississauga in 2022).

=== Music ===
A group of Croatian emigrants in Vancouver, fishermen from Sumartin, started in 1979 Klapa "Zvonimir", as a form of immigrant singing society. In the first decade Klapa was active in a form of traditional klapa, in informal and occasional ways. When Croatian ethnomusicologist Joško Ćaleta became a director, Klapa transformed into festival klapa, in formal and organised settings. While Ćaleta was conductor, Klapa "Zvonimir" was double winner of the best ethnic choir award in Canada (1994 and 1996).

=== Organisations ===
In 1928, Croatian emigrants founded Croatian National Home of Hamilton (Croatian: Hrvatski narodni dom) in Hamilton, Ontario.

== Sport ==
=== Soccer ===
Clubs

- Croatia Norval SC, Ontario
- Mississagua Croatia SC
- Hamilton Croatia
- Toronto Croatia
- Windsor Croatia
- CSC Oakville HRVAT
- HNK Livno
- Kitchener – Waterloo Croatia
- Ottawa Jadran
- HNNK HRVAT St. Catharines
- London Croatia
- HNK Zagreb Toronto
- HNNK Dalmacija Streetsville
- Croatia "Adria" SC Sudbury
- Winnipeg Croatia SC
- Calgary Croatia Sports Club
- Edmonton Croatia SC
- Vancouver Croatia SC

Tournaments

- HNNS Mens Tournament
- HNNS Youth Tournament

== Croatian Canadians ==
=== Businesspeople ===
- Robert Herjavec – CEO of the Herjavec Group, one Canada's most prominent technology companies
- Anton Kikaš – businessman and arms-smuggler
- Tihomir Orešković – 11th Prime Minister of Croatia

=== Politicians ===
- Eve Adams – Liberal MP, Mississauga-Brampton South; born Eve Horvat to Hungarian-Croat parents
- Bob Bratina – former Mayor of Hamilton, 2010–2014; Liberal MP, Hamilton East-Stoney Creek 2015–present
- Jan Brown – former Reform/Independent MP Calgary Southeast, 1993–1997
- Allan Kerpan – Saskatchewan Party MLA, Carrot River Valley, 2003–present; former Reform MP, Moose Jaw-Lake Centre, 1993–2000
- Janko Peric – former Liberal MP, Cambridge, 1993–2004
- Peter Sekulic – former Alta Liberal MLA, Edmonton Manning, 1993–1997
- Roseanne Skoke – former Liberal MP, Central Nova, 1993–1997
- John Sola – former Liberal MPP, 1987–1995
- Dave Stupich – former NDP MP, Nanaimo-Cowichan 1988–1993; former B.C. NDP MLA, 1963–1969; 1972–1988
- Ruža Tomašić – police officer and politician, Member of the European Parliament
- Berry Vrbanovic – mayor of Kitchener, 2014–present; Kitchener City Councillor, 1994–2014; Liberal Party candidate for Kitchener Centre in the 1999 Ontario Election.
- Lynne Yelich – Canadian Alliance/Conservative MP, Blackstrap, 2000–2015

=== Scientists ===
- Asaf Durakovic – physician and expert in nuclear medicine and depleted uranium; poet

=== Arts and entertainment ===
- Michael Bublé – singer
- Steve Bacic – actor
- Frank Cvitanovich – documentary filmmaker
- Ivan Hrvatska – singer
- Alicia Josipovic – actor
- Stana Katic – actor
- Josip Novakovich – writer
- Daniella Pavičić – singer and songwriter
- Teresa Toten – writer
- Elizabeth Anka Vajagic – singer

=== Athletes ===
- Nikola Andrijević – soccer player
- Sandra Bezić – figure skater
- Val Bezić – figure skater
- Željko Bilecki – soccer player
- Jonathan Blazevic – rower and cyclist
- Joseph Cattarinich – hockey player
- Macklin Celebrini – hockey player
- George Chuvalo – boxer
- Nick Dasović – soccer player
- Great Antonio – strength athlete
- Tony Hrkac – hockey player
- Dejan Jakovic – soccer player
- Ante Jazić – soccer player
- Mark Katic - hockey player
- Dan Kordić – hockey player
- John Kordić – hockey player
- Frank Mahovlich – hockey player
- Peter Mahovlich – hockey player
- Tony Mandarich – NFL player
- Phil Oresković – hockey player
- Matt Pavelich – hockey player
- George Pesut – hockey player
- Brian Sakić – hockey player
- Joe Sakić – hockey player
- Cory Sarich – hockey player
- Paul Spoljarić – baseball player
- Marc-Édouard Vlasić – hockey player
- Macklin Celebrini – hockey player
- Bo Horvat – hockey player
- Ivan Mamić – soccer player
- Niko Sigur – soccer player

=== Political activists ===
- Madeline-Ann Aksich
- Gojko Šušak

=== Other ===
- Mato Dukovac – World War II fighter ace
- Zvonko Vranesic – Master of Chess
- George "Stan Stasiak" Stipich – professional wrestler
- Petar Rajič – Catholic archbishop and Prefect of the Papal Household

== Acknowledgements ==
Several organisations of Croatian Canadians received Charter of the Republic of Croatia, conferred by Kolinda Grabar-Kitarović in 2019:

- Croatian National Home in Hamilton
- Sounds of Croatia Radio Programme in Toronto
- Canadian Croatian Folklore Federation - East
- Croatian National Soccer Federation
- Five Catholic parishes:
  - Immaculate Heart of Mary Croatian Roman Catholic Parish, Vancouver
  - St. Leopold Mandić Croatian Catholic Parish, Victoria
  - Our Lady of Marija Bistrica, Calgary
  - Nativity of Mary Croatian Catholic Parish, Edmonton
  - St. Nicholas Tavelich Croatian Parish, Winnipeg
- Croatian Canadian Folklore Federation - West
- Croatian Canadian Cultural Centre, Calgary

== See also ==
- Canada–Croatia relations
- Croats
- List of Croats
- European Canadians
- Yugoslav Canadians
- Croatian Americans

== Literature ==
- Ćaleta, Joško (1997). "Klapa singing, a traditional folk phenomenon of Dalmatia". Narodna umjetnost (in Croatian). 34 (1): 127–145. ISSN 1848-865X.
- Pejaković, Katarina (2022). ANGEL. Justin Press, Ottawa, p. 217.
