= HNNK Hrvat Chicago =

Croatian-backed soccer club from Chicago

HNNK Hrvat Chicago (a.k.a. Chicago Croatians) is a Croatian-backed soccer club from Chicago, Illinois. The club currently competes in the National Soccer League of Chicago, the premier semi-professional soccer competition in Illinois.

The club was founded in 1963 and is historically the most successful Croatian club in the US, though it has been overshadowed over the past few decades by another Croatian side from Chicago, RWB Adria. The height of Hrvat's success came in the 1970s and 1980s where they were one of the strongest state league clubs in the United States, making the final of the prestigious National Challenge Cup on three occasions. HNNK also sports a youth program U7 through U10, building the Croatian soccer community.

== Honours ==
- National Challenge Cup runners-up (3): 1974, 1979, 1984
- Illinois State Champions (4): 1973, 1976, 1978, 1986
- National Soccer League of Chicago (2): 1971, 1973
- Croatian-North American Soccer Tournament (7): 1968, 1975, 1976, 1977, 1979, 1986, 2009
- National Soccer League of Chicago indoor champions (2): 2004, 2008
