= Bill Conterio =

American soccer player

Personal information
- Full name: William Amedeo Conterio
- Date of birth: November 29, 1929
- Place of birth: Chicago, Illinois, U.S.
- Date of death: August 9, 2017 (aged 87)
- Height: 5 ft 9 in (1.75 m)
- Position: Midfielder

Senior career*
Years	Team	Apps	(Gls)
–1956	Chicago Slovaks		
1956	Chicago Falcons	2	(0)
–1956	Chicago Slovaks		

International career
1956	United States	1	(0)
- * Club domestic league appearances and goals

William Amedeo Conterio (November 29, 1929 – August 9, 2017) was an American soccer midfielder. He was a member of the United States soccer teams at the 1952 and 1956 Summer Olympics.

== Career ==
Conterio was born in Chicago, Illinois at the start of the Great Depression. He grew up on the northwest side of Chicago to a family which struggled financially. Despite these difficulties, Conterio became involved in athletics at Portage Park. This led him to playing Juvenile Ball with a Norwegian-American club. He credits that coach with teaching him to become ambidextrous. Conterio graduated from Carl Schurz High School in 1948. In high school, he earned nine varsity athletic letters in soccer, tennis, and wrestling. As captain, he led the Schurz H.S. soccer team to two Chicago City Championships, twice being named as an All-State soccer player. He was voted Most Athletic by his classmates and was later inducted into the school's Sports Hall of Fame.

Conterio played for several adult soccer teams before joining the Chicago Slovaks of the National Soccer League of Chicago. In 1952 he was chosen for the U.S. Olympic Soccer Team 1952 Summer Olympics, but did not enter any games in the tournament. Conterio also spent time in the mid-1950s in the U.S. Army. After his discharge in 1956, he was chosen for the 1956 U.S. Olympic team. He played one game during that tournament. After the Olympics, Conterio joined the Chicago Polish Falcons. He found the situation with the Falcons unpleasant and returned to the Slovaks after two games.

== Personal life ==
He later worked for Stalford Chemical Company in Omaha, Nebraska. His daughter Amy's children, Andy Huftalin, Nick Huftalin, Mitch Huftalin, and Matt Huftalin, all play soccer today. Nick plays as a goalkeeper for Carthage College, Andy as striker for the Marquette Golden Eagles, and the 1997-born twins, Mitch and Matt, for Rockford Raptors Soccer Club in Rockford, Illinois.
