= Jerry Panek =

American soccer player and coach

Personal information
- Full name: Teodor Jerzy Panek
- Date of birth: July 22, 1946 (age 80)
- Place of birth: Poland
- Position: Midfielder

Senior career*
Years	Team	Apps	(Gls)
- Broń Radom
- AZS-AWF Warszawa
1970–1971	Lechia Gdańsk	14	(9)
1975	Chicago Sting		
1975	Chicago Cats		(2)

International career
1973	United States	3	(0)

Managerial career
- Thomas More High School
- –1982: Milwaukee Kickers
- 1982: Marquette University (assistant)
- 1982–1991: Marquette University
- Milwaukee Rampage (assistant)
- * Club domestic league appearances and goals

Teodor Jerzy Panek (born July 22, 1946), also known as Jerry Panek, is a retired soccer player who played as a midfielder. Born in Poland, he earned three caps with the United States national team in 1973. He currently coaches youth soccer in Wisconsin.

== Player ==
In Poland he played for the Broń Radom, AZS-AWF Warszawa and Lechia Gdańsk.

=== Professional ===
In 1975, Panek played for the Chicago Sting in the North American Soccer League. He also played for the Chicago Cats of the American Soccer League that season.

=== National team ===
Panek's three national team games all came against Poland in 1973. The first was a 1–0 loss on August 3. The second was a 4–0 loss on August 10. Panek was replaced by Paul Child in the 60th minute. The last was a 1–0 victory on August 12. Panek was again replaced, this time by Stefan Szefer in the 60th minute.

== Coach ==
Panek coached Milwaukee Polonia and the Milwaukee Kickers of the Wisconsin Soccer Association. In 1982, he left the Kickers to become an assistant coach with Marquette University. When head coach Joe Born resigned during the season, Panek became the head coach on October 6, 1982. When he resigned at the end of the 1991 season, Panek had compiled a 97-80-20 record. Panek has also coached at Thomas More High School and was an assistant with the Milwaukee Rampage.

Panek has since returned to the Milwaukee Kickers Soccer Club, where he has been serving as their director of coaching since 2001.

Panek was inducted into the WASA Hall of Fame in 1991.

Panek attended Academy of Physical Education in Warsaw. He received a coaching license and master's degree in physical education. He is one of the most soccer specific educated coaches in the country.
