= David Dick (soccer) =

American soccer player

Senior career*
Years	Team	Apps	(Gls)
1941–1945	Philadelphia Americans		
1945–1953	Philadelphia Nationals		
- * Club domestic league appearances and goals

David Dick is an American retired soccer player who spent eleven seasons in the American Soccer League. In 1941, he began his career with the Philadelphia Americans, winning the league title with them in 1942 and 1944. In 1945, he then moved to the Philadelphia Nationals where he finished his career. During his time with the Nationals, he won three straight titles from 1949 to 1951. The nationals twice finished runner up in the National Challenge Cup during Dick's tenure with the team. In 1949, they lost to Morgan Strasser and in 1952, they fell to the Harmarville Hurricanes. In 1953, Dick was part of an American Soccer League All Star team which participated in a tournament in Guatemala and another in Bermuda.
