= David Dick =

David or Dave Dick may refer to:

- Dave Dick (Australian footballer) (1901–1982), Australian rules footballer
- David Dick (soccer), American soccer player
- Dave Dick (jockey) (1924–2001), British jockey
- "David Dick", 1834 story by Roger de Beauvoir

== See also ==
- David Dicks (born 1978), Australian sailor
