= Boris Shlapak =

American football player (born 1950)

No. 2
- Position: Kicker

Personal information
- Born: May 18, 1950 (age 76); Chicago, Illinois, U.S.
- Listed height: 6 ft 0 in (1.83 m)
- Listed weight: 175 lb (79 kg)

Career information
- High school: Maine South (Park Ridge, Illinois)
- College: Drake University (1968); Michigan State University (1969–1971)
- NFL draft: 1972: undrafted

Career history
- Baltimore Colts (1972); Buffalo Bills (1974)*
- * Offseason or practice squad member only

Career NFL statistics
- Field goals made: 0
- Field goal attempts: 8
- Field goal percentage: 0.0%
- Longest field goal: 0
- Touchbacks: 0
- Stats at Pro Football Reference

Ian Stone
Personal information
- Date of birth: May 18, 1950 (age 76)
- Place of birth: Chicago, Illinois, US
- Height: 6 ft 0 in (1.83 m)
- Position: Forward

Youth career
- Maine South High School
- 1968–1974: Chicago Lions SC

Senior career*
Years	Team	Apps	(Gls)
1975	Chicago Sting	1	(0)
- * Club domestic league appearances and goals

Ian Stone (born Boris Vladimir Shlapak, May 18, 1950) is an American former professional football player who was a placekicker for one season with the Baltimore Colts of the National Football League (NFL). He did not make a successful field goal in the NFL on eight attempts, the most attempts in NFL history without successfully kicking a field goal.

== American football career ==
=== College career ===
Shlapak spent his freshman year of college at Drake University before transferring to Michigan State University.

=== Professional career ===
==== Baltimore Colts ====
Shlapak was signed as an undrafted free agent by the Baltimore Colts in 1972. In the eight games he played for the team, he made all four of his extra point attempts, and attempted eight field goals, but he missed every single one. In total, he accounted for four points.

==== Buffalo Bills ====
He signed with the Buffalo Bills in 1974 and kicked two field goals for the Buffalo Bills in the Pro Football Hall of Fame Game.

== Soccer career ==
Shlapak also played soccer professionally in the North American Soccer League for the Chicago Sting after changing his name to Ian Stone. He played in one league match and several friendlies for the Sting in 1975.
