= Chicago Falcons =

American soccer team

The Chicago Falcons were an American soccer team which won the 1953 National Challenge Cup, the precursor to the US Open Cup, and also participated in the Chicago-area National Soccer League in the 1950s.

The Falcons won promotion to the NSL Major Division from the NSL First Division in 1952, the year they won the first of their two Peel Cup titles. In their first season in the Major Division, they finished second to the Ukrainian Lions. They also won their second consecutive Peel Cup in 1953. They played in the NSL's first division to at least 1956, but were no longer in the league by 1959. The Falcons also participated in the National Amateur Cup in 1952.

== National Challenge Cup ==
The Falcons beat the Harmarville Hurricanes in the 1953 National Challenge Cup final 3–0 on aggregate having defeated Kutis of St. Louis to make the finals. Kutis won the first leg of the Western Final 3–0 in St. Louis, but were found to have illegally registered two players. The tie was reduced to a single leg which the Falcons won 2–1, apparently played in St. Louis' North Side Arena.

After their cup win, the Falcons played Canadian champions New Westminster, losing 5–0.

== Honors ==
- National Challenge Cup
  - Winners (1): 1953
- Peel Cup
  - Winners (2): 1952, 1953
