= Orest Banach =

American soccer player (born 1948)

Orri Banach
Personal information
- Full name: Orest Banach
- Date of birth: March 31, 1948 (age 78)
- Place of birth: Neu-Ulm, Germany
- Height: 6 ft 1 1/2 in (1.87 m)
- Position: Goalkeeper

Youth career
- Ukrainian Lions

Senior career*
Years	Team	Apps	(Gls)
1966	Toronto Roma	4	(0)
1966–1967	Ukrainian Lions	?	(?)
1968	Boston Beacons	1	(0)
1969	Baltimore Bays	6	(0)
1969–1970	Hansa, Chicago	?	(?)
1971	St. Louis Stars	13	(0)
1972	Ukrainian Lions	?	(?)

International career
1969–1972	United States	4	(0)
- * Club domestic league appearances and goals

Orest Banach (Note: Ukrainian: Орест Банах, romanized: Orest Banakh) (born March 31, 1948; also known as Orrie or Orri Banach) (Note: Ukrainian: Оррі Банах, romanized: Orri Banakh) is an American retired soccer goalkeeper of Ukrainian descent who played three seasons in the North American Soccer League and earned four caps with the U.S. national team.

== Youth ==
While born in Germany, Banach grew up in the United States. He graduated from East Leyden High School of Franklin Park, Illinois in 1965.

== Club ==
Banach played for the Ukrainian Lions of the National Soccer League of Chicago. In 1966, he moved to Toronto Roma of the Eastern Canada Professional Soccer League. In 1967, he played in the American Soccer League with the Rochester Lancers. After he return to the Ukrainian Lions. He then played six seasons in the North American Soccer League, in 1968 for the Boston Beacons, in 1969 for the Baltimore Bays, in 1971 for the St. Louis Stars, and in 1972 for the Ukrainian Lions.

== National team ==
He also earned four caps, all World Cup qualifiers, with the U.S. national team between 1969 and 1972. His first cap was a 2–0 loss to Haiti on April 20, 1969. His second cap was another loss to Haiti on May 11, 1969. He did not play again for the national team until a 3–2 loss to Canada on August 20, 1972. In that game, he came out in 46th minute for Mike Winters. His last cap came nine days later, a 2–2 tie with Canada. He again came out of the game for Winter, this time in the 34th minute.
