= Alvin Hudson =

Canadian former soccer player (born 1976)

Personal information
- Full name: Alvin John Hudson
- Date of birth: 19 August 1976 (age 50)
- Place of birth: Canada
- Position: Defender

Senior career*
Years	Team	Apps	(Gls)
1999–2000	Chicago Sockers	8	(0)
2001	Chicago Fire Reserves	18	(1)
2002	Milwaukee Rampage	1	(0)
2003	Minnesota Thunder	11	(1)
2007	Vancouver Whitecaps	7	(0)
2007	Atlanta Silverbacks	7	(0)
2009	Brisbane Wolves	25	(1)
2010	Hamilton Croatia	23	(2)
- * Club domestic league appearances and goals

Alvin Hudson (born 19 August 1976) is a Canadian former soccer player who played in the USL A-League, Premier Development League, Brisbane Premier League, and Canadian Soccer League.

== Playing career ==
Hudson began his career with Chicago Sockers in the Premier Development League, where he won two PDL Championship, and a Division title. In 2001, he signed with Chicago Fire Reserves, and appeared in 18 matches and scored one goal. In 2002, he signed with the Milwaukee Rampage of the USL A-League, where he appeared in one match. In 2003, he signed with Minnesota Thunder where he featured in eleven matches and recorded one goal. In 2007, he signed with Vancouver Whitecaps, but was traded mid season to the Atlanta Silverbacks. On 22 January 2008, Atlanta announced the release of Hudson from his contract.

In 2009, he went abroad to Australia to sign with Brisbane Wolves FC of the Brisbane Premier League. Throughout the season he was appointed the team captain, and led his team to the Grand Final Championship final match against Capalaba FC, and contributed by scoring a goal in a 2-1 victory for Brisbane. In 2010, Hudson returned to Canada to sign with Hamilton Croatia of the Canadian Soccer League. He recorded his first goal for the club on 5 June 2010 in a 2-0 victory over Montreal Impact Academy. Hamilton would finish third in the overall standings with the best offensive record within the league. He helped Hamilton reach the CSL Championship finals, and featured in the quarter, and semi-final matches. In the CSL Championship match the club faced Brantford Galaxy, but lost the match to a score of 3-0.
