= Pullman F.C. =

Pullman F.C. was one of the dominant American soccer teams of the early twentieth century. Established in 1883 as the Pullman Company team, it was an inaugural member of the Chicago League of Association Football before moving to the Association Football League. It dominated the Peel Cup during the 1910s and early 1920s.

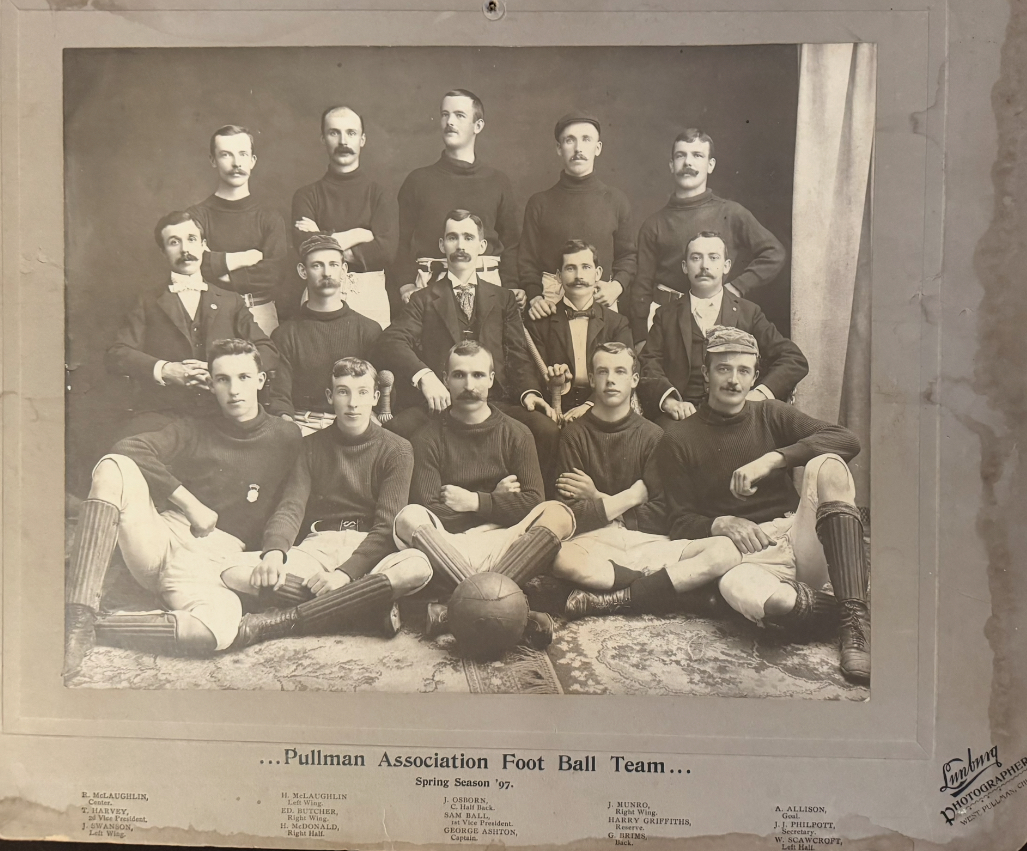
Team photo of Pullman soccer club from 1897

== History ==
In 1883, Pullman F.C. played the 39th Street Wanderers at Pullman's Lake Calumet athletic field complex in the first official association football game in Chicago, opening the inaugural season of the seven team Chicago League of Association Football (CLAF). Over the years, the Pullman Company sponsored numerous soccer teams, including teams for women, but the senior team remained in the CLAF for decades, competing for both the league championship, known as the Spalding Cup, and league cup, known as the Jackson Challenge Cup. Starting in 1901, Pullman also competed in a regional Midwestern professional soccer circuit, founded by Charles Comiskey in 1901 to take advantage of the popularity of the sport. The circuit included teams from Chicago, Milwaukee, St. Louis, and Detroit. It folded however in 1904.

In 1904, a new Chicago league, the Association Football League (AFA), was created as a rival to the CLAF. Pullman soon jumped leagues as the CLAF faded into obscurity to be replaced by the AFA as the city's dominant league. In 1912, Pullman built a soccer stadium for its team at 104th and Corliss. In 1913, the AFA collapsed, but was quickly replaced by the Chicago and District League, better known as the Chicago Soccer League. In 1917, Pullman disbanded its senior team. In 1920, the team was re-established. In the early twenties, Pullman moved to the Chicago Major Soccer League. It disbanded permanently in 1929.

== Year-by-year ==
Year	League	Reg. season	Peel Cup	National Challenge Cup
1909/10	AFA	2nd	Third round	N/A
1910/11	AFA	8th	?	N/A
1911/12	AFA	1st	Champion	N/A
1912/13	AFA	1st	Champion	N/A
1913/14	AFA	1st	Champion	Quarterfinal
1914/15	AFA	1st	Champion	Fourth round
1915/16	CSL	1st	?	Semifinal
1916/17	?	?	?	Second round
1917/18	On hiatus			
1918/19	On hiatus			
1919/20	On hiatus			
1920/21	?	?	Champion	Second round
1921/22	CSL	2nd	Final	Quarterfinal
1922/23	?	?	Champion	First round
1923/24	?	?	?	?
1924/25	?	?	Champion	Fourth round
1925/26	?	?	Champion	Quarterfinal
1926/27	?	?	?	?
1927/28	?	?	?	?
1928/29	?	?	?	?

== Honors ==
Peel Cup

- Winner (8): 1912, 1913, 1914, 1915, 1921, 1923, 1925, 1926
- Runner Up (1): 1922

Jackson Cup (League Cup)

- Winner (2): 1912, 1913, 1914, 1915

League Championship

- Winner (5): 1912, 1913, 1914, 1915, 1916
- Runner Up (2): 1910, 1922
