= Chicago Wings SC =

American-Ukrainian soccer club

Chicago Wings SC is an American-Ukrainian soccer club based in Chicago, Illinois. The club competed in the National Soccer League of Chicago and is currently competing in the First Division of the Metropolitan Soccer League.

The soccer club was founded in 1952 by young, recently arrived Ukrainian immigrants who populated the city of Chicago. The Wings Soccer Club operates under the Ukrainian American Youth Association (CYM). Over the decades Wings S.C. has fielded teams in the Major or 1st Division, as well as teams in the junior and youth age categories. The current operating teams are the Wings SC First Team, the Wings S.C. Over-50's, and the Wings S.C. Juniors. The Wings soccer teams, as did many of the organization's teams in other sporting categories, have won numerous trophies and championships, including many national tournaments hosted by the North American Ukrainian sporting associations USCAK and SUAST.

The Wings soccer club hosts their annual Wings Soccer tournament held in Baraboo, Wisconsin, which has been held since 1986. They also have an annual youth soccer camp, which is also held in Baraboo, which has been held since 1992. The year of 2017 has marked 2 major milestones as the club celebrated the club's 65th anniversary.

In 2015 the club made it to the First Division Championship of the Metro League, with a promotion to the Major Division on the line. The game was played against Republika Srpska on 11/8 at 8PM at Langhorst Field (Elmhurst College). After a hard-fought battle the Wings ended with a FULL-TIME score of 2-1.

The club participated in 2017 Great Lakes Cup hosted by rivals F.C. Connection, as well a Chicago-based Ukrainian side. Wings placed second overall, losing in a well-contested match to F.C. Connection 1-0 in the final

Wings SC hosted its 30th annual soccer tournament in early August 2017. The Men's Open Division team played well in the tournament and made the final. Despite fighting hard in the final the Wings lost to Madison United, 1-0, conceding their only goal of the tournament.

The Baraboo Wings Tournament Results:

The Open Division:

Year	Winner	Runner up	Score
2017	Madison United	Wings S.C.	1-0
2016	F.C. Connection	Madison United	
2015	Madison United	Das Magic	1-0
2014	Wings S.C.		
2013	Madison United	Wings S.C.	
2012	Wings S.C.		

The Over 48's Division:

Year	Winner	Runner up	
2017			
2016		Wings S.C.	
2015	Royal Cracovia	Madison United	4-0
2014			
2013			

Awards:

- Wings Tournament Championships:
- Major Division Championships:
- First Division Championships:
  - 2013 First Division Champions
- External Tournament Results:
  - 2015 SSK 7 v 7 Tournament Champions
  - 2011 Great Lakes Ukrainian Tournament Runners-Up

Famous Alumni:

- Nick Owcharuk - Former Professional Goalie in the American Soccer League, the Major Indoor Soccer League, and the North American Soccer League. Also, Ukrainian American Sports Hall of Fame Class of 20117
- Julian Kulas - Ukrainian American Sports Hall of Fame Class of 2016
- Orest Haliw - Ukrainian American Sports Hall of Fame Class of 2016
- Mario Kolody - Ukrainian American Sports Hall of Fame Class of 2018
- Joseph Owerko - DePaul University Athletic Hall of Fame Class of 2006 ( All-Time leader in career goals with 28 and 2nd All-Time in career points with 73)
- Bohdan Nedilskyj - Ukrainian American Sports Hall of Fame Class of 2016
- Jerry Kulas - Ukrainian American Sports Hall of Fame Class of 2016
- Yaro Dachniwsky - USA Olympian for Handball and Ukrainian American Sports Hall of Fame Class of 2017
