= Greater Los Angeles Soccer League =

- Founded: 1903; 123 years ago
- Country: United States
- Confederation: CONCACAF (North American Football Union)
- Number of clubs: 12
- Domestic cup: U.S. Open Cup
- International cup: CONCACAF Champions League

The Los Angeles Soccer League was a regional soccer league consisting of clubs based in and around Los Angeles. Established as the California Football Association, the league was founded in 1902 and it is one of the oldest soccer leagues in the United States (alongside the Cosmopolitan Soccer League and the Greater Chicago Soccer League).

The California Football Association changed, the south split off the San Francisco Soccer Football League and the Greater Los Angeles Soccer League was formed in 1951.

In 1963, Real Madrid CF came to LA to face Los Angeles United at the LA Coliseum. Stars like Paco Gento and Ferenc Puskas gave a great show thrashing the United by 9–0. Months after the game the historical LA United folded. Maccabee Los Angeles would be the team to dominate the league in the 1970s.

Nowadays, semi-professional and amateur leagues in and around Los Angeles are affiliated with the United States Adult Soccer Association region IV (California Soccer Association-South).

== Champions ==
Season	Champion
1950	Los Angeles Scots
1952	Los Angeles Scots
1954	Los Angeles Scots
1957	Danish Americans
1963	Los Angeles Kickers
1964	Los Angeles Kickers
1965	Los Angeles Kickers
1973	Maccabee Los Angeles
1975	Maccabee Los Angeles
1977	Maccabee Los Angeles
1978	Maccabee Los Angeles
1980	Maccabee Los Angeles
1981	Maccabee Los Angeles
1982	Maccabee Los Angeles
1986	Hollywood Stars SC
1988	San Pedro Croat
1989	San Pedro Croat
1990	San Pedro Croat

== 1951-52 teams ==
- Jackson High School
- San Pedro Yugoslavs
- Magyar A.C.
- LAAC Aztecs
- Swiss Soccer clubs
- Sons of Colombus
- Los Angeles Victoria AC
- Danes AC
- Scots AC
- Necaxa San Bernardino
- Austria F.C.
- Atlas AC
- Maccabee Los Angeles
- St.Stephens AC
- Olympia
- San Pedro Italians

== 1986-87 teams ==
- Hollywood Stars
- San Pedro Yugoslavs
- San Pedro Croat
- Inter-America
- San Gabriel
- Carson
- Cajititlan
- Atletico Latino
- Los Angeles United

== Notable presidents ==
- Duncan Duff 1953-
- Tony Morejon 1981–1989
- Gabriel Cucuk 1989-1993
