= Joško Ćaleta =

Croatian ethnomusicologist, music pedagogue

- Born: 2 October 1964 (age 62); Trogir
- Education: University of British Columbia; Academy of Music in Zagreb; Academy of Music in Split
- Awards: Josip Andreis prize (2000)
- Scientific career
- Fields: ethnomusicology
- Workplaces: Institute of Ethnology and Folklore Research
- Thesis: Music of the Dalmatian hinterland: Interdisciplinary anthropological – ethnomusicological approach to musical practice in a cultural context (2012)
- Doctoral advisor: Grozdana Marošević

Joško Ćaleta (2 October 1964) is a Croatian ethnomusicologist, music pedagogue, conductor, composer, record producer and klapa singer.

He is a member of the Croatian Composers' Society and the Croatian Ethnological Society.

== Early life and education ==
Born in Trogir in 1964, Ćaleta graduated in music education from the Academy of Music in Split in 1988, with the thesis Problems in interpreting contemporary music when working with amateur ensembles. He received the Master of Arts title in 1994 with the thesis Social and musical structure of the klapa singing style, Dalmatia and Vancouver at the University of British Columbia in Vancouver, under the mentorship of prof. Alan Thrasher. Since 1997, he has worked at the Institute of Ethnology and Folklore Research in Zagreb. Ćaleta received his doctorate degree in 2012 at the Academy of Music, University of Zagreb with the thesis Music of the Dalmatian hinterland: Interdisciplinary anthropological – ethnomusicological approach to musical practice in a cultural context.

== Career ==
He started singing in 1979 in Klapa Trogir. Ćaleta described his beginnings with klapa in article from 1997:

My love for singing began in early childhood when I learned to sing through listening and imitating older klapa singers. Having them for my idols, I hoped for a place among them. At the age of fifteen I had a chance to become a member of a klapa ensemble. I was fortunate to become a part of one of the best klapa ensembles, the klapa "Trogir", under the direction of Nikola Buble, the eminent maestro ("leader").

After he received further music education at the Music academy in Split, he became conductor of the klapa (1985–1989). Ćaleta also directed klapas "Radovan" and "Kairos", as well as "Zvonimir" (1989–1997), composed of Croatian Canadians in Vancouver. Under his guidance, "Zvonimir" was winner of the best ethnic choir award in Canada in 1994 and 1996.

Following his return to Croatia, he conducted klapas "Omiš", "Nostalgija", "Jelsa", "Sagena" and "Dišpet". He is record producer of around twenty music albums dedicated to klapa and other types of traditional singing in Croatia, six of which earned Croatian discographic award Porin (recorded by klapas "Nostalgija" and "Dišpet"). He is a member of professional, advisory and evaluation commissions, fairs and festivals throughout Croatia (International Folklore Fair, Pasionska baština), among others, klapa events: Dalmatian klapa Festival in Omiš, Večeri dalmatinske pisme in Kaštel Kambelovac, KiKfest in Buzet, Školjka in Pakoštane and higher lecturer in studies of ethnology and cultural anthropology at the University of Zadar.

Since 2001, Ćaleta is collaborating with National Folk Dance Ensemble of Croatia LADO as composer, vocal pedagogue and conductor. In 2008, he founded the Kantaduri ensemble, specialized in performing traditional vocal music of southern Croatia, the Adriatic and Dinaric cultural areas. Of particular note is the collaboration with Katarina Livljanić and the Dialogos ensemble from Paris, which resulted in the musical works Dalmatica (a work inspired by medieval church music in southern Croatia) and Okamejeni glasi (Heretical angels — a musical work inspired by the stećci and the religious heritage of medieval Bosnia and Herzegovina).

== Awards and honours ==
- Josip Andreis prize (2000), by Croatian Composers' Society
- Orlando prize (2003), at the Dubrovnik Summer Festival
- Ivan Lukačić prize (2004), at the Varaždin Baroque Evenings
- Porin (2004, 2012 and 2014)

== Selected works ==
=== Books ===
- Ćaleta, Joško (2006). Preveliku radost navišćujem vama [The Greatest Joy is Announced]. Cantus; LADO.
- Ćaleta, Joško; Bošković, Jurica (2011). Mediteranski pjev: o klapama i klapskom pjevanju [Mediterranean song – about klapa's and klapa singing]. Večernji list. ISBN 978-953-280-084-5.
- Ćaleta, Joško; Ćićerić, Tonći; Goreta, Ema; Vlašić, Danko; Žanić, Mladen (2017). Podstrana – Glagoljaško pučko crkveno pjevanje u Splitsko-makarskoj nadbiskupiji [Podstrana – Glagolitic folk Church chanting in the Split-Makarska Archdiocese]. Hrvatska kulturna udruga Pjevana baština; Institute of Ethnology and Folklore Research; Croatian Catholic University. ISBN 978-953-7528-09-6.
- Franov-Živković, Grozdana; Dubolnić Glavan, Martina; Dragan, Nimac; Joško, Ćaleta (2019). Vrgada. Glagoljaško pučko crkveno pjevanje u Zadarskoj nadbiskupiji [Vrgada. The Glagolitic folk Church Chanting in the Archdiocese of Zadar]. Hrvatska kulturna udruga Pjevana baština; Institute of Ethnology and Folklore Research; Croatian Catholic University. ISBN 978-953-7528-11-9.

=== Articles ===
- Ćaleta, Joško (1997). "Klapa singing, a traditional folk phenomenon of Dalmatia". Narodna umjetnost (in Croatian). 34 (1): 127–145. ISSN 1848-865X.
