= Raymond Bernabei =

American soccer player and referee

Ray Bernabei
Personal information
- Full name: Raymond Bernabei
- Date of birth: November 26, 1925
- Place of birth: New Castle, Pennsylvania, United States
- Date of death: September 5, 2008 (aged 82)
- Place of death: Longwood, Florida, United States
- Position: Fullback

Youth career
- 1946–1949: Indiana University of Pennsylvania

Senior career*
Years	Team	Apps	(Gls)
1949–1963	Harmarville Hurricanes		

Managerial career
- 1950: Indiana University of Pennsylvania
- * Club domestic league appearances and goals

Ray Bernabei (November 26, 1925 – September 5, 2008) was a US soccer fullback who played eleven seasons with the Harmarville Hurricanes. He was also a long time collegiate and professional referee. He is a member of both the National Soccer Hall of Fame and the National Intercollegiate Soccer Officials Association (NISOA) Hall of Fame.

== Player ==
Bernabei played as a youth player with the Indianolo Indians. He attended Indiana University of Pennsylvania, playing and coaching soccer at the school from 1946 to 1950. He was inducted into the school's Athletic Hall of Fame in 1996. In 1949, he joined the semi-professional Harmarville Hurricanes. He would play with Harmarville until his retirement in 1963. During these years, Harmarville was a national powerhouse winning the 1952 and 1956 U.S. Open Cups, and finishing runner up in 1953. Harmarville also lost in the finals of the 1950 and 1951 Amateur Cups.

== Referee ==
Bernabei served as a collegiate and professional referee for forty-three years. During this time, he officiated two NCAA finals. He also served as the president and executive director of the National Intercollegiate Soccer Officials Association.

He was inducted into the National Intercollegiate Soccer Officials Association (NISOA) Hall of Fame in 1976, the National Soccer Hall of Fame in 1978, and received the Bill Jeffrey Award for outstanding service to intercollegiate soccer in 1985. He died in Florida from complications related to non-Hodgkin's lymphoma.
