= Art Martinich =

American soccer player

International career
Years	Team	Apps	(Gls)
1973	USA	3	

Art Martinich is an American former soccer player who earned caps with the United States men's national soccer team in 1973.

Martinich's first game with the national team came in a 1–0 loss to Poland on August 3, 1973. He was subbed out for Richard Green at halftime. Two days later, he played every minute of a 1–0 win over Canada. His third, and last, game was five days after that when the U.S. lost 4–0 to Poland.
