= Nick Krat =

Ukrainian-American soccer player

Personal information
- Birth name: Mykola Krat
- Date of birth: February 24, 1943 (age 83)
- Place of birth: Ukraine
- Position: Defender

Youth career
- 1962–1965: Michigan State Spartans

Senior career*
| Years | Team | Apps | (Gls) |
| 1962–1966 | Ukrainian Lions | | |
| 1967 | Chicago Spurs | 11 | (0) |
| 1967–1968 | St. Louis Stars | 26 | (0) |
| 1969–1974 | Ukrainian Lions | | |
| 1972 | Chicago Schwaben | | |

International career
| 1968–1972 | United States | 14 | (0) |
- * Club domestic league appearances and goals

Nick Krat (Note: Ukrainian: Нік Крат, romanized: Nik Krat) (born Mykola Krat, (Note: Ukrainian: Микола Крат, romanized: Mykola Krat) February 24, 1943) is a retired soccer defender who played professionally in the National Soccer League of Chicago and the North American Soccer League. He earned fourteen caps with the United States men's national soccer team between 1968 and 1972.

== Youth ==
Krat, a native of Ukraine, attended college at Michigan State University where he played on the men's soccer team. In 1965, he was named the Defensive MVP of the NCAA post-season tournament as the Spartans went to the championship game, only to lose to Saint Louis University. That season, Krat was also named a First Team All American.

== Professional ==
In 1962, Krat began his career with the Ukrainian Lions of the National Soccer League of Chicago. He would play every season for the Lions until 1974 except for two. In 1967, he began the season as a center back with the Chicago Spurs of the National Professional Soccer League (NPSL) before moving to the St. Louis Stars. In 1968, the NPSL merged with the United Soccer Association to form the North American Soccer League. After the merger, Krat spent one more season, 1968, with the Stars, this time in the NASL. He won the 1972 and 1974 NSLC championships the Lions.

== National team ==
Krat earned fourteen caps with the national team between 1968 and 1972. His first game came on September 15, 1968, in a tie with Israel. At the time, the U.S. was preparing for the 1970 FIFA World Cup qualifying games. Krat started all six of those matches as the U.S. went 3-3, failing to make the tournament. The national team had no games in 1970 and 1971. When it resumed play in 1972, Krat started the first three games.
