= Chicago Slovak =

American soccer team

The Chicago Slovaks were a Chicago soccer team that was based in Berwyn, Illinois. They were the 1941 winners of the Kelley Cup. In 1942 and 1951, the Chicago Slovaks won the Peter J. Peel Challenge Cup. They tied with the Vikings for the Peel cup in 1943. They participated in the National Soccer League and won in 1951, 1952, and 1954. Some of their players during that time were Pete Matevich, who earned 4 caps for the United States men's national soccer team; Bill Conterio, who was a member of the United States soccer team at the 1952 and 1956 Summer Olympics; and Gino Gardassanich, who played for multiple clubs in Croatia, as well as earned 6 caps with the United States men's national soccer team. In 1970, the team reached the semifinals of the 1970 US Open Cup.

The Slovak Athletic Association is the successor to the Chicago Slovaks, which is a club for Slovak-Americans living in the Chicago area that nominates former players to the Illinois Soccer Hall of Fame. The club celebrated 100 year anniversary in 2024.
