= 1956 National Challenge Cup =

- Dewar Challenge Cup

Tournament details
- Country: United States

Final positions
- Champions: Harmarville Hurricanes
- Runners-up: Chicago Schwabens

The 1956 National Challenge Cup was the 43rd edition of the United States Soccer Football Association's annual open soccer championship. The final was contested over two legs between Harmarville Hurricanes and Chicago Schwabens, which the Hurricanes won 3–2 on aggregate score after a comeback from a two-goal deficit. Schwaben won the first leg 1–0 at home at Winnemac Stadium (in Chicago) and also scored the first goal in the return leg. The Hurricanes then scored three consecutive goals, including the clinching goal in the 142nd minute.
