= Stefan Szefer =

American soccer player (born 1942)

Personal information
- Full name: Stefan Rudolf Szefer
- Date of birth: May 8, 1942 (age 84)
- Place of birth: Pabianice, Poland
- Height: 6 ft 0 in (1.83 m)
- Position: Defender

Youth career
- 1959–1962: Pabianice

Senior career*
Years	Team	Apps	(Gls)
1963–1965	Śląsk Wrocław		
1966–1968	ŁKS Łódź		
1968	Chicago Mustangs		
1969–1971	MVV Maastricht	49	(2)
1971–1973	Chicago Wisła		
1973–1975	Ukrainian Lions		
1975	Chicago Sting	22	(3)
1976	Chicago Cats		
1977–1979	Chicago Sting	40	(3)
1980–1981	Chicago Sting (indoor)	8	(1)

International career
1966–1967	Poland	3	(0)
1973	United States	3	(0)
- * Club domestic league appearances and goals

Stefan Rudolf Szefer (born May 8, 1942), also known as Steve Shafer or Shaffer, is a former soccer player who played as a defender. He earned six caps during his career, three with Poland and three with the United States.

== Club career ==
Most sources for Szefer's early career are in Polish. In 1964, he was with Śląsk Wrocław. He then played for ŁKS Łódź from 1966 to 1968. In 1968, Szefer moved to the Chicago Mustangs of the North American Soccer League. The Mustangs folded at the end of the season. He then moved to Dutch club MVV Maastricht for two seasons, scoring two goals as a left back. In 1971, Szefer moved back to Chicago where he played for two amateur teams, Chicago Wisla (1971–1973) and the Ukrainian Lions (1973–1975). In 1975, he signed with the expansion Chicago Sting of the NASL. In May 1976, Szefer joined the Chicago Cats of the American Soccer League, but returned to the Sting for the 1977 season. Szefer played outdoor for the Sting until 1979. He returned briefly in 1980 to play for them during the 1980–1981 NASL indoor season.

== International career ==
=== Poland ===
Szefer played three games for the Poland from 1966 to 1967. He also played for Poland in the 1968 European Championship.

=== United States ===
In 1973, Szefer played for the U.S. under the name Steve Shafer. The first game was a 2–0 win over Canada on August 5. Five days later, he played in a 4–0 loss to Poland. On August 12, he played his last game with the U.S., a 1–0 win over Poland. He was replaced by Jerry Panek in the 60th minute.
