= Russell Hulse (footballer) =

Belizean footballer

Russell Hulse is a retired Belizean soccer player who played for Maccabi Los Angeles from 1977 thru 1982 winning the National Challenge Cup (US Open Cup) 3 times in 1977, 1978 and 1981 and appearing in the final in 1980 and 1982.
