= George Meyer (soccer coach) =

American former soccer coach

Personal information
- Full name: George Lescault Meyer
- Date of birth: 21 December 1922
- Place of birth: Chicago, Illinois, United States
- Date of death: 1 June 2022 (aged 99)

Managerial career
- Years: Team
- 1957: United States
- 1965: United States
- 1968: Chicago Mustangs
- 1971: St. Louis Stars
- 1976: Chicago Cats

George Meyer (born in Chicago, Illinois) is an American former soccer coach who had two brief tenures as head coach of the United States men's national soccer team, in 1957 and 1965. He also led the American team in its attempt to qualify for the 1964 Olympics, managing to lose a game to Suriname.

Meyer's record in charge of the USMNT was unimpressive but this was at a time when the USMNT had very few professionals to call on. In qualifying for the 1958 World Cup the United States lost home and away to Mexico 2-13 on aggregate, and lost home and away to Canada 3-8 on aggregate.

After the unsuccessful attempt to qualify for the 1964 Olympics, Meyer was retained to oversee the effort to qualify for the 1966 World Cup in England. The US fared better this time around, opening qualification with a creditable 2-2 draw at home to Mexico. They lost 2-0 in the return but won 1-0 and drew 1-1 in their two qualifying matches against Honduras.

He also coached Chicago Mustangs in 1968, when he was the only American coach in the NASL. He later coached the St. Louis Stars in 1971 and the Chicago Cats in 1976.
