= RWB Adria =

- Full name: Red White Blue Adria Chicago
- Founded: 1959; 67 years ago
- Stadium: Hales Franciscan High School
- Head coach: Sinisa Alebic
- League: Greater Chicago Soccer League
- Website: rwbadria.com
Home colors

RWB Adria (full name: Red White and Blue Adria, Croatian: Crven, bijeli, plavi Jadran) is an American soccer club from Chicago, Illinois. The club currently competes in the Midwest Premier League as well as the National Soccer League of Chicago.

== History ==
RWB Adria was founded in 1959 by Croatian immigrants in the city of Chicago. From its humble beginnings the club has gone on to become one of the most successful soccer clubs in Illinois, and is believed to have won the most trophies of any club in Illinois soccer. The most high-profile player to have played for RWB Adria is the legendary Portuguese player Eusébio who had a stint at the club in the late 1970s.

The club has been a regular participant in the Croatian North American Soccer Tournament since the competitions inception in 1964. RWB Adria has won the tournament on 12 occasions, second only to Toronto Croatia. RWB Adria has also participated in the U.S. Open Cup, the American equivalent of the FA Cup, five times: in 1991 (where the club was a semi-finalist), in 1996, in 2007, in 2008, and 2014. The club's main rivals include fellow Croatian-American sides from Chicago, HNK Zrinski Chicago and HNNK Hrvat Chicago.

2015 saw RWB compete in the fledgling Great Lakes Premier League along with teams from Wisconsin and Michigan. RWB won the league with a 100% record in the five games played by the time the final decision went their way with Oakland United's 3–4 home defeat on July 12.

The team announced it would play in the Midwest Premier League in 2020, but the COVID-19 pandemic forced cancellation of that season and a delay until 2021

== Honors ==
- National Amateur Cup Champions (2): 2011, 2013
- National Amateur Cup Runners-up (2): 2012, 2025
- National Amateur Cup, Region II Champions (4): 2012, 2019, 2023, 2025
- Great Lakes Premier League Champions (1): 2015
- National Soccer League of Chicago Champions (14): 2006, 2007, 2010, 2011, 2012, 2014, 2015, 2016, 2018, 2019, 2021, 2022, 2023, 2024
- Peel Cup (Illinois State Cup) (Currently Called The Tony Dallas Cup) Champions (14): 1988, 1989, 1993, 1994, 2002, 2003, 2005, 2006, 2008, 2010, 2013, 2016, 2019, 2022
- Croatian-North American Soccer Tournament Champions (18): 1966, 1980, 1982, 1984, 1985, 1994, 1998, 2001, 2002, 2003, 2004, 2007, 2013, 2014, 2015, 2016, 2019, 2021
- Hank Steinbrecher Cup (US Soccer Amateur Championship) Champions (1): 2014
- Midwest Premier League Heartland Conference Champions (2): 2024, 2025

== U.S. Open Cup ==
- 1996

First Round: El Paso Patriots - RWB Adria 3-0

- 2008

First Round: Rochester Rhinos - RWB Adria 2-1

- 2013

First Round: Pittsburgh Riverhounds - RWB Adria 1-1 (5-3 p)

- 2014

First Round: Detroit City FC - RWB Adria 2-2 aet (1-3 p)
Second Round: Michigan Bucks - RWB Adria 0-1 aet
Third round: Pittsburgh Riverhounds - RWB Adria 3-2 aet

- 2015

First Round: Lansing United - RWB Adria 0-0 (4-2 p)
