= Meir Segal =

Romanian footballer

Meir Segal is a former Romanian National footballer.

Segal moved to the US to play football in 1976. He continued his career as a player in the U.S in what later would become a national champion team with the Maccabi Los Angeles football team. Segal joined the team in 1976 and by 1978 he earned a Golden Boot Award on top of the Triple Crown both in 1977 and 1978 winning the National Soccer League Title, California State Cup and the National Challenge Cup. Segal started in the 1978 National Challenge Cup Final at Giants Stadium in front of a crowd of over 30,000 people.

During this time he also coached and started the soccer program at Notre Dame High School in Sherman Oaks, California. For the first time in the school's history, Notre Dame fielded a fotball team and had success competing in the Santa Fe League. The varsity squad wound up with a league record of 7-3-2 and 12-5-2 overall. This was good enough to place them second in the league and give the team a place in the C.I.F. playoffs.

Meir Segal currently coaches at Classic Soccer Club in Tempe Az.
