= 1953 National Challenge Cup =

- Dewar Challenge Cup

Tournament details
- Country: United States
- Dates: 1 March – 26 April 1953

Final positions
- Champions: Chicago Falcons (1st title)
- Runners-up: Harmarville Hurricanes
- Semifinalists: St. Louis Kutis S.C.; New York Americans

The 1953 National Challenge Cup was the 40th edition of the USSFA's annual open soccer championship. The Chicago Falcons defeated the Harmarville Hurricanes (a suburban Pittsburgh team) to win.
