= Maccabee Los Angeles =

American soccer club with multiple national championships

Maccabee Athletic Club
- Full name: Maccabee Los Angeles מכבי לוס אנג'לס
- Nickname: Maccabees
- Founded: 1971 (competitive)
- Dissolved: 1982
- Stadium: Jackie Robinson Field
- Capacity: 10,820
- League: Greater Los Angeles Soccer League
Home colors

Maccabee Athletic Club (Hebrew: מכבי לוס אנג'לס, MAH-KAH-Bee) was an American athletic club based in Los Angeles, California. The primary activity of the club was Maccabee Los Angeles Soccer Club, a team which competed professionally in the Greater Los Angeles Soccer League. The soccer club is notable for appearing in the US Open Cup final seven times in its eleven-year history, becoming one of only two teams to win the competition five times.

== History ==
Maccabee Los Angeles Soccer Club was formed by a group of Israeli immigrants to serve as a recreational Sunday soccer team. The team began playing competitively in 1971 as part of the Greater Los Angeles Soccer League, with the addition of former Israeli national team players who had recently immigrated to the Los Angeles area. While the club used the Star of David and other Jewish symbols, the players came from various countries and many of them were not Jewish. They won the Triple Crown twice in 1977 and 1978 by winning the Greater Los Angeles Soccer League, California State Cup and the US Open Cup. They qualified for the CONCACAF Champions Cup in 1974 and 1978 but withdrew before competing both times. Maccabee Los Angeles played Bridgeport Vasco da Gama from Connecticut in the 1978 US Open Cup winning the final at Giants Stadium in East Rutherford, New Jersey. The match was part of a double header with the New York Cosmos and the Tampa Bay Rowdies of the North American Soccer League in front of 30,000 fans. Maccabee Los Angeles ceased operations after the 1982 season but Maccabee Athletic Club is still in existence for youth players.

== Honors ==
- US Open Cup
  - Winner (5): 1973, 1975, 1977, 1978, 1981
  - Finalist (2): 1980, 1982
- Triple Crown Winners: (2): 1977, 1978
- Greater Los Angeles Soccer League
  - Winner (7): 1973, 1975, 1977, 1978, 1980, 1981, 1982

== Past rosters ==
=== US Open Cup 1973 ===
Note: Flags indicate national team as defined under FIFA eligibility rules; some limited exceptions apply. Players may hold more than one non-FIFA nationality.

No.	Pos.	Nation	Player
3	DF	GER	Eric Braeden
2	DF	ISR	Eli Marmur
8	MF	ISR	Yarone Schmitman
7	MF	ISR	Pinchas Benzaken
6	MF	ISR	Genny Ben-Acote
4	DF	USA	Mike Caspi
9	FW	ISR	Moshe Hoftman
1	GK	ARG	Eduardo Chantre
11	FW	MEX	Miguel Cuevas
10	FW	ISR	Benny Binshtock
5	DF	ARG	Vicente Guiterez
12	FW	ISR	Morris Storch
14	MF	USA	Michael Meyer (historian)

=== US Open Cup 1975 ===
Note: Flags indicate national team as defined under FIFA eligibility rules; some limited exceptions apply. Players may hold more than one non-FIFA nationality.

No.	Pos.	Nation	Player
2	DF	ISR	Eli Marmur
10	MF	MEX	Chon Miranda
11	FW	ISR	Benny Binshtock
3?	DF	MEX	Daniel Salazar Gutierrez

=== US Open Cup 1977 ===
Note: Flags indicate national team as defined under FIFA eligibility rules; some limited exceptions apply. Players may hold more than one non-FIFA nationality.

No.	Pos.	Nation	Player
1	GK	ARG	Eduardo Chantre
2	DF	ISR	Eli Marmur
3	DF	USA	Leo Kulinczenko
4	DF	BLZ	Russell Hulse
8	MF	ISR	Abraham Cohen
10	MF	MEX	Manuel Mena
11	FW	ENG	Guy Newman
9	FW	ROU	Meir Segal
7	FW	ISR	Benny Binshtock

=== US Open Cup 1978 ===
Note: Flags indicate national team as defined under FIFA eligibility rules; some limited exceptions apply. Players may hold more than one non-FIFA nationality.

No.	Pos.	Nation	Player
1	GK	ARG	Eduardo Chantre
2	DF	ISR	Eli Marmur
3	DF	USA	Leo Kulinczenko
4	DF	BLZ	Russell Hulse
5	DF	ISR	Joseph Mizrahi
6	MF	ISR	Abraham Cohen
7	FW	SLV	Toni Moran
8	MF	ARG	Ramon Sandounh
9	FW	ROU	Meir Segal
10	MF	ESP	Carlos Roveri
11	FW	ISR	Izhar Mozik
12	FW	ISR	Benny Binshtock
13	DF	USA	Peter Gonzales

=== US Open Cup 1980 ===
Note: Flags indicate national team as defined under FIFA eligibility rules; some limited exceptions apply. Players may hold more than one non-FIFA nationality.

No.	Pos.	Nation	Player
1	GK	ARG	Eduardo Chantre
4	DF	BLZ	Russell Hulse
9	FW	USA	Ole Mikkelsen
10	FW	USA	Remon Douek
11	FW	TRI	Tony Douglas

=== US Open Cup 1981 ===
Note: Flags indicate national team as defined under FIFA eligibility rules; some limited exceptions apply. Players may hold more than one non-FIFA nationality.

No.	Pos.	Nation	Player
1	GK	ARG	Eduardo Chantre
4	DF	BLZ	Russell Hulse
9	FW	TRI	Tony Douglas
10	MF	NED	Dan Ben Dror
11	FW	USA	Remon Douek

=== US Open Cup 1982 ===
Note: Flags indicate national team as defined under FIFA eligibility rules; some limited exceptions apply. Players may hold more than one non-FIFA nationality.

No.	Pos.	Nation	Player
1	GK	ARG	Eduardo Chantre
9	FW	TRI	Tony Douglas
4	DF	BLZ	Russell Hulse
10	FW	USA	Remon Douek

== US Open Cup results ==
- 1973 Maccabee Los Angeles 5 vs Cleveland Inter Italian 3
- 1975 Maccabee Los Angeles 1 vs New York Inter Giuliana 0
- 1977 Maccabee Los Angeles 5 vs Philadelphia German-Hungarians 1
- 1978 Maccabee Los Angeles 2 vs Bridgeport Vasco da Gama 0 (OT)
- 1980 New York Pancyprian-Freedoms 3 vs Maccabee Los Angeles 2
- 1981 Maccabee Los Angeles 5 vs Brooklyn Dodgers 1
- 1982 New York Pancyprian-Freedoms 4 vs Maccabee Los Angeles 3 (OT)
