= Mike Noha =

Former soccer player

Miguel "Mike" Noha
Personal information
- Date of birth: 1939 (age 86–87)
- Place of birth: Buenos Aires, Argentina

Senior career*
| Years | Team | Apps | (Gls) |
- Toronto Ukrainians
| 1972–1974 | Ukrainian Lions | | |
| 1959–1964 | Philadelphia Ukrainian Nationals | | |
| 1962 | Toronto Roma | | |
| 1963 | Montreal Ukrainians | | |
| 1963 | Toronto Roma | | |

International career
| 1964 | United States | 1 | (0) |
- * Club domestic league appearances and goals

Miguel "Mike" Noha (Note: Ukrainian: Михайло Нога, romanized: Mykhailo Noha) (born 1939) is a former soccer player who played as a forward. He spent at least five seasons in the American Soccer League. Born in Argentina, he earned one cap for the United States national team.

== Professional career ==
Born in the barrio of Villa Urquiza, Noha played soccer with local side Defensores de Villa Maipú in the Argentine league. In 1959, he moved to the United States, where he played for the Philadelphia Ukrainian Nationals until a knee injury ended his career in 1974. He was the ASL leading scorer during the 1959–1960 season with twenty-two goals. That season, Noha also gained a "double" when the Ukes won the ASL and National Challenge Cup titles. They won the National Cup in a 5–2 victory over the Los Angeles Kickers, with Noha scoring all five Philly goals. Philadelphia repeated as league and National Cup champions in 1960–1961. While Noha did not lead the league in scoring, he was the league MVP. He was still listed with Philadelphia when he appeared with the national team in 1964.

In 1962, he played abroad in the Eastern Canada Professional Soccer League with Toronto Roma. He returned to play in the ECPSL in 1963 with the Montreal Ukrainians. After a dispute with club officials, he re-signed with Toronto Roma for the remainder of the 1963 season.

== National team ==
Noha earned one cap with the U.S. national team in a 10–0 loss to England on May 27, 1964.
