= Croatian-North American Soccer Tournament =

The Croatian-North American Soccer Tournament is a soccer tournament established in 1964 featuring teams representing the Croatian Canadian and Croatian American communities. It is organized by the Croatian National Soccer Federation of Canada & the U.S., and hosted annually by a CNSF member club.

It is traditionally played on the Labour Day weekend to accommodate teams who have to travel long distances. There is no prize money for winning the tournament. The event attracts large Croatian crowds and is intended to allow each host club to gain financially so that they can maintain stability and promote their Croatian name and heritage in their own cities.

The dynasties of the competition are Toronto Croatia and Chicago CBP. Similar tournaments for Croatian diaspora teams are held in the west coast of North America and in Australia.

== Tournament winners ==
Club	Titles	Last Title
Chicago CBP	18	2021
Toronto Croatia	14	2010
Hrvat Chicago	7	2009
Cleveland Croatia	6	2025
Hamilton Croatia	2	1969
Zrinski Chicago	2	2011
Croatia Windsor	2	2021
Hrvat Kitchener	2	2026
Croatia New York	1	2012
Croatia London	1	1997
Dalmacija Streetsville	1	2018
Croatia Vancouver	1	1993
Velebit Oakville	1	1996
Zagreb Cleveland	1	1967
Hrvat St. Catharines	1	2023
Croat San Pedro	1	2024

== History of Tournaments ==
Year	Winner	Host Club
2026	Hrvat Kitchener	Jadran Ottawa (Can)
2025	Croatia Cleveland	Croatia Windsor (Can)
2024	Croat San Pedro	Cleveland Croatia (USA)
2023	Hrvat St. Catharines	HNNS (Hamilton)
2022	Adria Sudbury	Hrvat Kitchener (Can)
2022	Croatia Cleveland	Croatia Cleveland (USA)
2021	Croatia Windsor	Croatia Windsor (Can)
2021	Chicago CBP	Croatia Cleveland (USA)
2020	No tournament due to COVID	
2019	Chicago CBP	Toronto Zagreb
2018	Streetsville Dalmacija	Norval Croatia
2017	Cleveland Croatia	Hrvatski Orlovi Milwaukee
2016	Chicago CBP	Kitchener Hrvat
2015	Chicago CBP	Chicago CBP
2014	Chicago CBP	Dalmacija Streetsville
2013	Chicago CBP	Zrinski - Vitezovi Chicago
2012	New York Croatia	Livno Oakville
2011	Zrinski Chicago	Hamilton Croatia
2010	Toronto Croatia	St. Catharines Hrvat
2009	Hrvat Chicago	Cleveland Croatia
2008	Cleveland Croatia	London Croatia
2007	Chicago CBP	Windsor Croatia
2006	Toronto Croatia	Florida Croatia
2005	Zrinski Chicago	Adria Sudbury
2004	Chicago CBP	Sault Ste. Marie Croatia
2003	Chicago CBP	Toronto Zagreb
2002	Chicago CBP	Norval Croatia
2001	Chicago CBP	Hrvatski Orlovi Milwaukee
2000	Toronto Croatia	New York Croatia
1999	Kitchener Hrvat	Kitchener Hrvat
1998	Chicago CBP	Oshawa Adria
1997	London Croatia	Oakville Velebit
1996	Oakville Velebit	Chicago CBP
1995	Toronto Croatia	Detroit Croatia
1994	Chicago CBP	Toronto Croatia
1993	Vancouver Croatia	Hamilton Croatia
1992	Toronto Croatia	Hrvat Chicago
1991	Cleveland Croatia	Cleveland Croatia
1990	Toronto Croatia	London Croatia
1989	Toronto Croatia	Windsor Croatia
1988	Toronto Croatia	Adria Sudbury
1987	Cleveland Croatia	Ottawa Jadran
1986	Hrvat Chicago	Toronto Zagreb
1985	Chicago CBP	Hrvatski Orlovi Milwaukee
1984	Chicago CBP	Kitchener Hrvat
1983	Toronto Croatia	Oshawa Adria
1982	Chicago CBP	Oakville Velebit
1981	Windsor Croatia	Chicago CBP
1980	Chicago CBP	Cleveland Hrvat
1979	Hrvat Chicago	Toronto Croatia
1978	Toronto Croatia	Hamilton Croatia
1977	Hrvat Chicago	Hrvat Chicago
1976	Hrvat Chicago	London Croatia
1975	Hrvat Chicago	Cleveland Croatia
1974	Toronto Croatia	Croatia Windsor
1973	Toronto Croatia	Adria Sudbury
1972	Toronto Croatia	Hamilton Croatia
1971	Toronto Croatia	Chicago CBP
1970	Toronto Croatia	Croatia New York
1969	Hamilton Croatia	Toronto Croatia
1968	Hrvat Chicago	Cleveland Zagreb
1967	Cleveland Zagreb	Hrvatski Orlovi Milwaukee
1966	Chicago CBP	Hamilton Croatia
1965	Hamilton Croatia	Hrvat Chicago
1964	Cleveland Croatia	Cleveland Croatia
