= Daniella Pavicic =

- Origin: Toronto, Ontario, Canada
- Occupations: Singer, songwriter
- Years active: 2007–2020
- Website: www.daniellamusic.com

Daniella Pavicic (Pavičić), a.k.a. Daniella, is a Croatian-Canadian singer and songwriter, raised in Toronto. Daniella received her first No. 1 Billboard dance record, "Every Word" (with Ercola), in November 2008. SOCAN gave Daniella a No. 1 song award for "Every Word" in January 2009.

== Biography ==
Daniella was raised in Mississauga, a suburb of Toronto. She received her education at a Catholic school where she was active in talent shows and choirs. She played piano and the tambura, and danced Croatian folklore, ballet and modern dance. She sang in televised music festivals in Neum and Sibenik along the Croatian Adriatic Coast alongside notable Croatian performers Tereza Kesovija, Severina, and Thompson.

== Career ==
In November 2008, Daniella had her first no. 1 Billboard record with the track "Every Word" by Ercola and Daniella, remixed by Wendel Kos. Daniella and Alexander Perls wrote the melody and lyrics with music by Ercola. "Every Word" remained on the Hot Dance Airplay chart for 46 weeks. It was the no. 1 "Song of the Year" on BPM XM Satellite Radio in 2008. It was No. 1 on the UK Upfront Club Chart for two consecutive weeks in January 2009. Following the No. 1 track listing, Daniella produced the official "Every Wor"d music video, which aired on BPM TV in Canada and MTV Dance in the UK. The video was produced by Matt McDermitt (Backstreet Boys, Riz, Kim Sozzi).

In 2007, Daniella co-wrote "Summerfish" with Alexander Perls and Leonid Rudenko, which received no. 1 Song of the Year on BPM XM Satellite radio. The track played globally with support by major DJs such as Tiesto and introduced Daniella as a notable dance music vocalist and songwriter.

In 2008, "Every Word" received a nomination for the Best HiNRG track of the year at Miami's Winter Music Conference.

SOCAN gave Daniella a no. 1 song award for "Every Word" in January 2009.

== Singles ==
- "Every Word" – Ercola feat. Daniella – Fektive (NL) / Nervous (US) / Houseworks (Ger) - 2008
- "Ride" – Pacific & Vandyck feat. Daniella – Fektive (NL) - 2008
- "In Your Head" – Mikel Curcio – Noir Music (CA) / Star 69 – 2008
- "It's Over" – Mikel Curcio – Omnis Recordings (Ireland) - 2008
- "Summerfish" - Leonid Rudenko feat. Daniella - Fektive (NL) / Cyber (FR) / Nervous (US) 2007
- "Spinnin' it Back" – Pacific and Vandyck, Ben Macklin, Scandall feat. Daniella 2007
- "Gotta Move it" – Control One feat. Daniella – Track One (US) 2007
- "Shakin' that Groove All Day" – Albert Cabrera feat. Daniella – Track One (US) 2007
- "Groove in Me" – Da'Others and Stephen Kass feat. Daniella - Track One (US) 2007
