= 1985 CONCACAF Champions' Cup =

21st edition of premier club football tournament organized by CONCACAF

- Dates: 9 April 1985 – 26 January 1986

Final positions
- Champions: (Trinidad and Tobago) Defence Force
- Runners-up: (Honduras) Olimpia

The 1985 CONCACAF Champions' Cup was the 21st edition of the annual international club football competition held in the CONCACAF region (North America, Central America and the Caribbean), the CONCACAF Champions' Cup. It determined that year's club champion of football in the CONCACAF region and was played from 9 April 1985 till 26 January 1986.

The teams were split into 2 zones, North/Central America and Caribbean, (as North and Central America sections combined to qualify one team for the final), each one qualifying the winner to the final tournament. All the matches in the tournament were played under the home/away match system.

Trinidadian side Defence Force beat Hondurean team Olimpia 2–1 on aggregate, becoming CONCACAF champion for the first time in their history and also the first club from that country to win the competition. This is the last time to date a team from the Caribbean has won the continental title.

== North/Central American Zone ==
=== First round ===
Team 1	Agg.	Team 2	1st leg	2nd leg
Hotels International FC (Bermuda)	0–3	(Guatemala) Aurora	0–0	0–3
Chicago Croatian (United States)	0–6	(Honduras) Olimpia	0–4	0–2
Suchitepéquez (Guatemala)	4–1	(El Salvador) Águila	2–1	2–0
Vida (Honduras)	2–2 (5–4 pen.)	(El Salvador) FAS	1–1	1–1
América (Mexico)	4–2	(Mexico) Guadalajara	3–1	1–1

- Aurora advances to the fourth round.
- Olimpia, Suchitepéquez, Vida and América advance to the second round.

25 May 1985	Hotels International FC (Bermuda)	0–0	(Guatemala) Aurora	Hamilton, Bermuda
				Stadium: Bermuda National Stadium

2 June 1985	Aurora (Guatemala)	3–0 (3–0 agg.)	(Bermuda) Hotels International FC	Guatemala City, Guatemala
				Stadium: Estadio del Ejército

28 April 1985	Chicago Croatian (United States)	0–4	(Honduras) Olimpia	Tegucigalpa, Honduras
			Juan Flores x 2	Stadium: Estadio Nacional Chelato Uclés

1 May 1985	Chicago Croatian (United States)	0–2 (0–6 agg.)	(Honduras) Olimpia	Tegucigalpa, Honduras
				Stadium: Estadio Nacional Chelato Uclés

Both legs were played in Tegucigalpa, Honduras

24 May 1985	Suchitepéquez (Guatemala)	2–1	(El Salvador) Águila	Los Angeles, United States
	Dagoberto Medrano; Eugenio Flores		Juan Antonio Argueta	Stadium: Los Angeles Memorial Coliseum

26 May 1985	Águila (El Salvador)	0–2 (1–4 agg.)	(Guatemala) Suchitepéquez	Los Angeles, United States
			Ernesto Almengor; Carlos Castañeda	Stadium: Los Angeles Memorial Coliseum

Both legs were played in Los Angeles, United States

24 May 1985	Vida (Honduras)	1–1	(El Salvador) FAS	Los Angeles, United States
	Domingo Drummond		Juan Luis Guerrero	Stadium: Los Angeles Memorial Coliseum

26 May 1985	FAS (El Salvador)	1–1 (2–2 agg.) (5–4 p)	(Honduras) Vida	Los Angeles, United States
	Jose Luis Guerrero		Rolando Valladares	Stadium: Los Angeles Memorial Coliseum

Both legs were played in Los Angeles, United States

9 April 1985	América (Mexico)	3–1	(Mexico) Guadalajara	Los Angeles, United States
				Stadium: Los Angeles Memorial Coliseum

23 April 1985	Guadalajara (Mexico)	1–1 (2–4 agg.)	(Mexico) América	Los Angeles, United States
				Stadium: Los Angeles Memorial Coliseum

Both legs were played in Los Angeles, United States

=== Second round ===
Team 1	Agg.	Team 2	1st leg	2nd leg
Suchitepéquez (Guatemala)	1–1 (3–4 pen)	(Honduras) Olimpia	1–0	0–1
Vida (Honduras)	1–3	(Mexico) América	1–0	0–3

- Olimpia and América advance to the third round.

30 June 1985	Suchitepéquez (Guatemala)	1–0	(Honduras) Olimpia	Mazatenango, Guatemala
				Stadium: Estadio Carlos Salazar Hijo

7 July 1985	Olimpia (Honduras)	1–0 (1–1 agg.) (4–3 p)	(Guatemala) Suchitepéquez	Tegucigalpa, Honduras
				Stadium: Estadio Nacional Chelato Uclés

23 July 1985	Vida (Honduras)	1–0	(Mexico) América	Tegucigalpa, Honduras
				Stadium: Estadio Nacional Chelato Uclés

- 1st leg in Tegucigalpa
- Vida were in fact the Honduras national team

30 July 1985	América (Mexico)	3–0 (3–1 agg.)	(Honduras) Vida	Querétaro, Mexico
				Stadium: Estadio Corregidora

- 2nd leg in Querétaro
- Vida were in fact the Honduras national team

=== Third round ===
Team 1	Agg.	Team 2	1st leg	2nd leg
Olimpia (Honduras)	3–2	(Mexico) América	2–2	1–0

- Olimpia advances to the fourth round.

20 August 1985	Olimpia (Honduras)	2–2	(Mexico) América	Querétaro, Mexico
				Stadium: Estadio Corregidora

27 August 1985	América (Mexico)	0–1 (2–3 agg.)	(Honduras) Olimpia	Querétaro, Mexico
			Amílcar Lanza	Stadium: Estadio Corregidora

2nd leg in Querétaro

=== Fourth round ===
Team 1	Agg.	Team 2	1st leg	2nd leg
Aurora (Guatemala)	1–2	(Honduras) Olimpia	1–0	0–2

- Olimpia advances to the final.

6 November 1985	Aurora (Guatemala)	1–0	(Honduras) Olimpia	Guatemala City, Guatemala
				Stadium: Estadio del Ejército

20 November 1985	Olimpia (Honduras)	2–0 (2–1 agg.)	(Guatemala) Aurora	Tegucigalpa, Honduras
				Stadium: Estadio Nacional Chelato Uclés

== Caribbean Zone ==
The following clubs reportedly entered:
(Netherlands Antilles) SUBT
(Haiti) Violette
(Jamaica) Boys' Town
(Jamaica) Tivoli Gardens
(Martinique) Aiglon du Lamentin
(Suriname) SV Robinhood
but it is not known whether they played any matches.

=== First round ===
Team 1	Agg.	Team 2	1st leg	2nd leg
Racing Gonaïves (Haiti)	0–1	(Martinique) Golden Star	0–0	0–1
San Francois National (Trinidad and Tobago)	2–4	(Guadeloupe) Moulien	1–2	1–2
Jong Holland (Netherlands Antilles)	0–0 (4–3 pen.)	(Suriname) Transvaal	0–0	0–0

- Further matches and results are unknown among clubs at this stage.

Racing Gonaïves (Haiti)	0–0	(Martinique) Golden Star

Golden Star (Martinique)	1–0 (1–0 agg.)	(Haiti) Racing Gonaïves

San Francois National (Trinidad and Tobago)	1–2	(Guadeloupe) Moulien

Moulien (Guadeloupe)	2–1 (2–4 agg.)	(Trinidad and Tobago) San Francois National

Jong Holland (Netherlands Antilles)	0–0	(Suriname) Transvaal

Transvaal (Suriname)	0–0 (0–0 agg.) (3–4 p)	(Netherlands Antilles) Jong Holland

=== Second round ===
Team 1	Agg.	Team 2	1st leg	2nd leg
Moulien (Guadeloupe)	1–0	(Barbados) Weymouth Wales	1–0	
Defence Force (Trinidad and Tobago)	2–0	(Guadeloupe) JS Capesterre	1–0	1–0
Jong Holland (Netherlands Antilles)	3–0	(Netherlands Antilles) SUBT	2–0	1–0
Robinhood (Suriname)	3–3 (3–4 pen.)	(French Guiana) Montjoly	0–1	3–2

- Apparently played over one leg.
- Further matches and results are unknown among clubs at this stage.

Moulien (Guadeloupe)	1–0 (1–0 agg.)	(Barbados) Weymouth Wales

Defence Force (Trinidad and Tobago)	1–0	(Guadeloupe) JS Capesterre

JS Capesterre (Guadeloupe)	0–1 (0–2 agg.)	(Trinidad and Tobago) Defence Force

Jong Holland (Netherlands Antilles)	2–0	(Netherlands Antilles) SUBT

SUBT (Netherlands Antilles)	0-1 (3–0 agg.)	(Netherlands Antilles) Jong Holland

Robinhood (Suriname)	0–1	(French Guiana) Montjoly

Montjoly (French Guiana)	2–3 (3–3 agg.) (4–3 p)	(Suriname) Robinhood

=== Third round ===
Team 1	Agg.	Team 2	1st leg	2nd leg
Montjoly (French Guiana)	4–0	(Netherlands Antilles) Jong Holland	3–0	1–0

- Further matches and results are unknown among clubs at this stage.

Montjoly (French Guiana)	3–0	(Netherlands Antilles) Jong Holland

Jong Holland (Netherlands Antilles)	0–1 (0–4 agg.)	(French Guiana) Montjoly

=== Final round ===
Team 1	Agg.	Team 2	1st leg	2nd leg
Montjoly (French Guiana)	***	(Trinidad and Tobago) Defence Force		

- Defence Force apparently beat Montjoly in the final round
  to qualify as winners of the Caribbean Zone.

== Final ==
=== First leg ===
1985 CONCACAF Champions' Cup Final
January 19, 1986
First leg

Defence Force (Trinidad and Tobago)	2–0	(Honduras) Olimpia
Kenneth

Hasely Crawford Stadium, Port of Spain

=== Second leg ===
January 26, 1986
Second leg

Olimpia (Honduras)	1–0	(Trinidad and Tobago) Defence Force
Espinoza

Estadio Francisco Morazán, San Pedro Sula

Team details

Olimpia

Defence Force

- Defence Force won 2–1 on aggregate.

== Champion ==
CONCACAF Champions' Cup
1985 Champions
(Trinidad and Tobago)
Defence Force
Second title
