= Ukrainian Lions =

Ukrainian American Sports Club Lions
- Full name: Ukrainian American Sports Club Lions
- Nickname(s): The Ukrainian Lions
- Founded: 1949
- League: National Soccer League (Chicago)

The Ukrainian Lions was a soccer club that was operated by the Ukrainian American Sports Club. The club was based in Chicago, Illinois. It was founded in 1949 by Ukrainians that had settled in the Chicago area after the Second World War. They competed professionally in the Lamar Hunt US Open Cup (National Challenge Cup) and the National Soccer League (Chicago). All their home games were played at Hansen Stadium. There were 6 players from the Ukrainian Lions that played on the US National Team Willy Roy, Nick Krat, Orest Banach, Stefan Szefer, Fred Kovacs and Mike Noha.

In 1975, the Chicago Sting signed Ukrainian Lions players Willy Roy, Stefan Szefer, Richard Greene, Mike Winters, Eugene Andrus and Ian Stone for their inaugural season in the North American Soccer League. Other players that went on to play in the American Soccer League and the North American Soccer League were Nick Owcharuk with the San Diego Sockers, Leo Kulinczenko with the Los Angeles Skyhawks and Bill Mishalow with the Memphis Rogues. The club stopped operations in 2004.

== Honors ==
- National Soccer League of Chicago Champion: 4

1952-53, 1970–71, 1971–72, 1973–74

- Peel Cup: 1

1956

- Illinois Governors Cup:3

1972, 1974, 1977

== Notable former players ==
- (Germany) Orest Banach
- (Argentina) Mike Noha
- (Germany) Willy Roy
- (United States) Leo Kulinczenko
- (United States) Bill Mishalow
- (United States) Nick Owcharuk
- (Ukraine) Nick Krat
- (United States) Ian Stone
- (United States) Eugene Andrus
- (United States) Mike Winters
- (Peru) Richard Greene
- (Germany) Fred Kovacs
- (Poland) Stefan Szefer

== Former managers ==
- 1970–1986 (Ukraine) Anatoly Hordinskyj
- 1974–1981 (Ukraine) Vadim Mishalow
- 1969–1970 (Ukraine) Orest Klufas
