= Croatian National Soccer Federation =

North American soccer organization

Croatian National Soccer Federation (Croatian: Hrvatski Nacionalni Nogometni Savez) of is a soccer federation which helps coordinate Croatian Canadian and Croatian American clubs. It organizes the annual Croatian-North American Soccer Tournament. It is based in Toronto, Ontario.

During the time of Communist Yugoslavia the Federation considered itself the National representative of Croatian soccer, recognizing the Croatian Football Federation (HNS) as its superior after 1991. The CNSF has organized special events with the help of the HNS in recent years. In 2005 Hajduk Split's junior side had a tour of Canada, and the Croatian U21s played several matches against local Croatian Canadian sides.
