= Peel Cup =

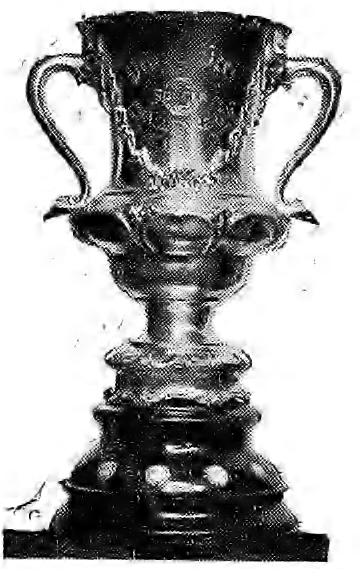

The Peter J. Peel Challenge Cup, better known as the Peel Cup, was an open soccer competition that crowned the Illinois state champion until it was replaced by the Illinois Governor's Cup in 1971.

== History ==
=== Origins ===
Peter Peel was born in 1866 in Dublin, Ireland and moved to Chicago, Illinois when young. He founded the first soccer association in Illinois, served as president of the Chicago Soccer League, and later became president of the United States Football Association. In 1909, he established a competition, named after himself, open to all soccer clubs in the Midwestern United States. Proceeds from the competition went to a fund to benefit injured soccer players. The first tournament included clubs from Chicago, Peoria, and Coal City. Peel also had plans to include clubs from St. Louis, Detroit, and Cleveland the following year. On October 3, 1909, the Campbell Rovers defeated Coal City 3–0 in front of a large crowd at the 124th Field Artillery Amory (52nd Street and South Cottage Grove Avenue) to win the first cup. Until the 1914 establishment of the National Challenge Cup, the Peel Cup was among the most significant cup competition in the United States. While it was originally intended to determine the club champion of the mid-west, the Peel Cup quickly became the tournament to determine the Illinois State Champions. For several years it was a de facto Chicago championship, due to the large number of talented teams in the city, especially those playing in the National Soccer League of Chicago. At the time, aside from Bethlehem Steel, teams from Chicago, New York City and Saint Louis dominated American soccer.

=== Name changes ===
After being awarded to the Olympics on November 1, 1970, the Peel Cup disappeared. The decision was made at that time to replace it with the Governor's Cup. Since then, the cup has changed names multiple times based on a tradition that the first team to win it three times keeps the cup. However, through all its name changes it continues to crown the annual Illinois State Champions and is commonly referred to as the Illinois State Cup. The winner, and runner up, of the Illinois State Cup advances to the Regional Tournament of Champions.

=== Peel Shield ===
The Peel Cup should not be confused with the Peel Shield which was established by Peter Peel in 1912 and held until 1919 as a high school soccer competition.

=== 2007 Final ===
On September 21, 2007, the cup final between RWB Adria and United Serbs was halted in the 40th minute with the score tied at 2–2 after rival fans began rioting.

=== Peel Cup ===
- 1909 Campbell Rovers
- 1910 Hyde Park Blues
- 1911 Blue Island
- 1912 Pullman F.C.
- 1913 Pullman F.C.
- 1914 Pullman F.C.
- 1915 Pullman F.C.
- 1916 Chicago Americans
- 1917 Harvey F.C.
- 1918 Joliet F.C.
- 1919 Scottish-Americans
- 1920 Bricklayers and Masons F.C.
- 1921 Pullman F.C.
- 1922 Olympia
- 1923 Pullman F.C.
- 1924 Bricklayers and Masons F.C.
- 1925 Pullman F.C.
- 1926 Pullman F.C.
- 1927 Coal City Maroons
- 1928 Chicago Sparta
- 1929 Chicago Sparta
- 1930 Chicago Sparta
- 1931 Chicago Sparta
- 1932 Chicago Sparta
- 1933 Chicago Sparta
- 1934 Wieboldts
- 1935 Harvey United
- 1936 Maccabees A.C.
- 1937 Chicago Sparta
- 1938 Manhattan Beer
- 1939 Chicago Sparta
- 1940 Vikings
- 1941 Vikings
- 1942 Chicago Slovak
- 1943 Chicago Slovak / Vikings
- 1944 Vikings
- 1945 Swedish-Americans
- 1946 Chicago Sparta
- 1947 Chicago Sparta
- 1948 Chicago Sparta
- 1949 Vikings
- 1950 A.A.C. Eagles
- 1951 Chicago Slovak
- 1952 Chicago Falcons
- 1953 Chicago Falcons
- 1954 A.A.C. Eagles
- 1955 A.A.C. Eagles
- 1956 Ukrainian Lions
- 1957 A.A.C. Eagles
- 1958 Schwaben
- 1959 Kickers
- 1960 Kickers
- 1961 Kickers
- 1962 Kickers
- 1963 A.A.C. Eagles
- 1964 Kickers
- 1965 Olympics
- 1966 Hansa
- 1967 Kickers
- 1968 Olympic
- 1969 Chicago Sparta / Kickers
- 1970 Olympics

=== Illinois Governor's Cup ===
- 1971 Schwaben
- 1972 Ukrainian Lions
- 1973 Croatans
- 1974 Ukrainian Lions
- 1975 Wisla
- 1976 Croatans
- 1977 Ukrainian Lions

=== Fred W. Netto Cup ===
- 1978 Croatan
- 1979 San Francisco
- 1980 Winged Bull
- 1981 Wisla
- 1982 Winged Bull
- 1983 Winged Bull

=== George E. Fishwick Cup ===
- 1984 Wisla
- 1985 Wisla
- 1986 Croatan
- 1987 Wisla

=== William P. Hemmings Cup ===
- 1988 RWB Adria
- 1989 RWB Adria
- 1990 Schwaben
- 1991 Schwaben
- 1992 Chicago Pegasus
- 1993 RWB Adria

=== Alfredo V. Arias Cup ===
- 1994 RWB Adria
- 1995 Chicago Pegasus
- 1996 United Romanians
- 1997 United Romanians
- 1998 Santos Degollado
- 1999 A.A.C. Eagles
- 2000 A.A.C. Eagles
- 2001 Morelia
- 2002 RWB Adria
- 2003 RWB Adria

=== George L. Chazaro Cup ===
- 2004 Vikings
- 2005 RWB Adria
- 2006 RWB Adria
- 2007 Suspended

=== Frank Mariani Cup ===
- 2008 RWB Adria
- 2009 Hellenic United / Ho Chunk
- 2010 RWB Adria
- 2011 International SC
- 2012 Hellenic United
- 2013 RWB Adria
- 2014 Vikings AA
- 2015 Vikings AA
- 2016 RWB Adria

=== Tony Dallas Cup ===
- 2017 AAC Eagles
- 2018 CKS Warta
- 2019 RWB Adria
- 2020 Canceled due to the COVID-19 Pandemic
- 2021 AAC Eagles
- 2022 RWB Adria
- 2023 Czarni Jaslo Chicago
- 2024 KS Wisloka Chicago
- 2025 Edgewater Castle FC
- 2026 Czarni Jaslo Chicago

=== Championships by Team ===
- RWB Adria: 14 times (1988, 1989, 1993, 1994, 2002, 2003, 2005, 2006, 2008, 2010, 2013, 2016, 2019, 2022)
- Pullman: 7 times (1912, 1913, 1914, 1915, 1921, 1925, 1926)
- Sparta: 8 times (1928, 1929, 1930, 1931, 1932, 1933, 1937, 1939, 1946, 1947, 1948) (Note: Sparta won 11 recorded titles in total during the historical era)
- Vikings / Vikings AA: 6 times (1940, 1941, 1944, 2004, 2014, 2015)
- AAC Eagles: 4 times (1999, 2000, 2017, 2021)
- Wisla: 4 times (1981, 1984, 1985, 1987)
- Winged Bull: 3 times (1980, 1982, 1983)
- Czarni Jaslo Chicago: 2 times (2023, 2026)
