= Fred Kovacs =

American soccer player

Fredrich Kovacs
Personal information
- Full name: Fredrich Kovacs
- Position: Defender

Senior career*
Years	Team	Apps	(Gls)
- Chicago Schwaben
- Chicago Sting

International career
1972–1973	United States	4	
- * Club domestic league appearances and goals

Fredrich Kovacs is an American former soccer player who earned four caps with the U.S. national team in 1972 and 1973.

Kovacs gained his first cap in a World Cup qualifier on September 10, 1972. The U.S. lost, 2–1, to Mexico. Kovacs started the game, then came off in the 56th minute for Gary Rensing. Kovacs then played three more full internationals in 1973. His last came in a 2–0 win over Canada on August 5, 1973.

Kovacs is also a longtime member of Schwaben Athletic Club of Chicago. He is a former Chicago Sting player.
