= Nick Owcharuk =

American soccer player

Personal information
- Date of birth: May 29, 1955 (age 71)
- Place of birth: Chicago, United States
- Height: 6 ft 1 in (1.85 m)
- Position: Goalkeeper

Senior career*
Years	Team	Apps	(Gls)
1976	Minnesota Kicks	2	(0)
1978	San Diego Sockers	0	(0)
1979	Tulsa Roughnecks	0	(0)
1979–1980	Tulsa Roughnecks (indoor)	3	(0)
1980–1981	Phoenix Inferno (indoor)	15	(0)
1982	Rochester Flash		
- * Club domestic league appearances and goals

Nick Owcharuk is an American retired soccer goalkeeper who played professionally in the American Soccer League and Major Indoor Soccer League and North American Soccer League.

In 1976, Owcharuk signed with the Minnesota Kicks of the North American Soccer League. He played three games, then was released. He joined the San Diego Sockers in the early part of the 1978 season, then moved to the Tulsa Roughnecks in 1979. He played a handful of games for the Roughnecks during the 1979–1980 NASL indoor season. In the fall of 1980, he signed with the Phoenix Inferno of the Major Indoor Soccer League. In 1981, he played for the Rochester Flash of the American Soccer League.
