= Bill Mishalow =

American soccer player

Personal information
- Full name: Wadim Mishalow
- Date of birth: March 6, 1952 (age 74)
- Place of birth: Chicago, Illinois, U.S.
- Position: Goalkeeper

Youth career
- 1973–1975: Alabama–Huntsville Chargers

Senior career*
Years	Team	Apps	(Gls)
1976–1978	Los Angeles Aztecs	26	(0)
1979	Memphis Rogues	2	(0)
1979	New England Tea Men	1	(0)
1979–1980	Pittsburgh Spirit (indoor)	10	(0)
1980	Atlanta Chiefs	11	(0)
1980–1981	Chicago Sting (indoor)	7	(0)
1981–1984	Memphis Americans (indoor)	77	(0)
- * Club domestic league appearances and goals

Wadim Mishalow is an American retired soccer goalkeeper who played in the North American Soccer League and the Major Indoor Soccer League.

Mishalow attended the University of Alabama, Huntsville, playing on the men's soccer team from 1973 to 1975. In 1976, he turned professional with the Los Angeles Aztecs of the North American Soccer League. He spent three seasons in Los Angeles before moving to the Memphis Rogues for the start of the 1979 season. He finished the season with the New England Tea Men. In the fall of 1979, he signed with the Pittsburgh Spirit of the Major Indoor Soccer League but injuries prevented him from playing until the end of December. He was back in the NASL in 1980 with the Atlanta Chiefs. The Chiefs then sent him to the Chicago Sting where he played the 1980–1981 NASL indoor season. In the fall of 1981, he was back in the MISL, this time with the Memphis Americans. He played three seasons with the Americans.
