= 1952 National Challenge Cup =

Football cup championship in the United States

- Dewar Challenge Cup

Tournament details
- Country: United States
- Dates: 11 March – 17 June 1952

Final positions
- Champions: Harmarville Hurricanes (1st title)
- Runners-up: Philadelphia Nationals
- Semifinalists: New York German–Hungarian S.C.; Sparta

The 1952 National Challenge Cup was the 39th edition of the United States Soccer Football Association's annual open soccer championship.

The Harmarville Hurricanes defeated the Philadelphia Nationals in a two-legged final, losing the first game 3-4 but winning the second 4-1.
