= Chicago Cats =

American soccer club

The Chicago Cats was an American soccer club based in Chicago, Illinois, that was a member of the American Soccer League. They played their home games at Hanson Stadium in Chicago's Belmont Cragin community.

== Year-by-year ==
Year	Division	League	Reg. season	Playoffs	U.S. Open Cup
1975	2	ASL	3rd, Midwest	Did not qualify	Did not enter
1976	2	ASL	3rd, East	Disqualified	Did not enter

Note: The 1976 Chicago Cats were declared by ASL commissioner Bob Cousy to have forfeited an unplayed, season-ending match against Cleveland. The forfeit leveled the two teams with 80 points. At the same time Commissioner Cousy controversially gave the final playoff spot to Cleveland, even though Chicago held the first two tiebreakers; wins and goal-differential.

== Coaches ==
- (Socialist Federal Republic of Yugoslavia) Mike Grbic (1975)
- (United States) George Meyer (1976)
