= Harmarville Hurricanes =

- Full name: Harmarville Hurricanes Soccer Club
- Nickname: The Hurricanes
- Founded: 1947 (by Frank DeMor)
- Dissolved: 1967
- Stadium: Consumer Field; Harmarville, Pennsylvania

The Harmarville Hurricanes were an amateur soccer club from Harmarville, Pennsylvania, a suburb of Pittsburgh, that twice won the Lamar Hunt U.S. Open Cup, known then as the National Challenge Cup, in 1952 and 1956. They also played in the Cup Final in 1953.

The team was owned by the Harmar Coal Company. Many of the players worked in the coal industry in addition to playing for the Hurricanes.

The Hurricanes beat the American Soccer League's Philadelphia Nationals 7–5 in the 1952 cup final with the winning goal scored by Sonny Yakopec.

The 1956 Final saw the Hurricanes win 3–2 on aggregate score after a comeback from a two-goal deficit. They lost the first leg on the road 1–0 and conceded the first goal in the return home leg. Harmarville defeated the Philadelphia Uhriks in the Eastern semifinal to make the final.

U.S. Soccer Hall of Fame players Ray Bernabei and Robert Craddock played for Harmarville.

== Honors ==
National Challenge Cup

- Champion -- 1952, 1956
- Runner-up -- 1953

National Amateur Cup

- Runner-Up -- 1950, 1951
