= Greater Chicago Soccer League =

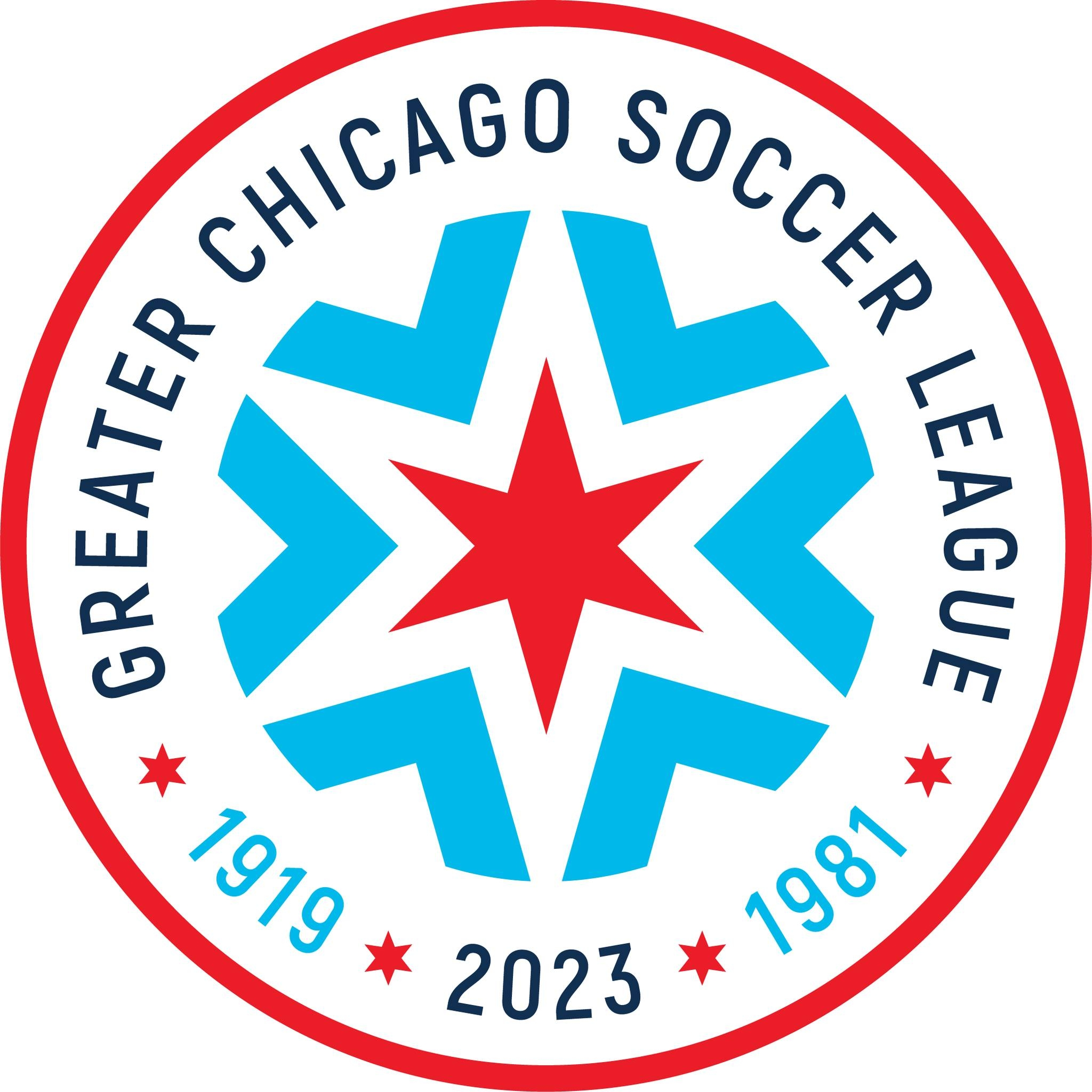
- Founded: 1919; 107 years ago
- Country: United States
- Confederation: CONCACAF (North American Football Union)
- Number of clubs: 50
- Level on pyramid: 5
- Domestic cup: U.S. Open Cup
- International cup: CONCACAF Champions League
- Current champions: Ethos United
- Website: gcslsoccer.com

The Greater Chicago Soccer League, formerly the National Soccer League (Chicago), formed by the merger of the Chicago Soccer League and International Soccer Football League of Chicago in 1928, is a semi-professional U.S. soccer league which claims to be the oldest continuously operating soccer league in the United States.

== History ==
In 1904, the Association Football League of Chicago (AFLC) was established as an ethnic British league in Chicago, Illinois. While the AFL, and others like it, catered to the British and Irish expatriate communities, there were few opportunities available to the rest of Chicago's many immigrant groups to play organized, competitive soccer. In 1913, the Chicago Soccer League came into existence. In 1915, it merged with the AFLC to form the Chicago and District Association Football League (CDAFL). However, this new league was better known as the Chicago Soccer League. In 1919, several non-British teams left the CDAFL to form the International Soccer League. This league lasted only one year, but led to the founding of the International Soccer Football League in 1920. That year the ISFL, with Frank Foldi as its president, was created to address the lack of league opportunities for non-British teams. With teams from nearly every significant ethnic group in Chicago, the ISFL quickly established itself as a major player in Chicago soccer. The league grew in strength as most of the city's other amateur and semi-professional league collapsed. In 1924, Carl Johnson of the ISFL's Swedish-Americans, became the first U.S. player from outside the north-east capped by the national team. In 1930, the ISFL created a junior division to give young players an opportunity to develop their talents at a high level en route to a spot on a first division roster. This served to enhance the league's stability as it grew its own talent pool. In 1938, only the Chicago Soccer League and the International Soccer Football League remained as the top two city leagues. That year, they merged to form the National Soccer League of Chicago.

World War II hit the NSL hard as most of the top players were inducted in the armed forces. However, the end of the war brought a renaissance when those men returned from the military, to be quickly followed by western and central European immigrants fleeing the devastation caused by the war. A few years later, another wave of immigrants, this time Eastern Europeans fleeing communism, brought another fresh group of talented players into the NSL. These waves of immigration led to an expansion of the league into multiple divisions including junior and youth teams. While centered on Chicago, the league expanded to include teams from towns surrounding the city.

In 1950, the National Soccer League created the first indoor soccer league in the United States. Chicago leagues had played indoor tournaments for decades but this was the first time an annual competitive indoor season was founded. The league featured twelve teams with games broadcast live on radio. This indoor adjunct of the NSL was continued until 1968. That year, the North American Soccer League was created as a division one league. While the NASL struggled at times and ultimately folded in 1984, it created a national league which drew the best U.S. players away from the traditional regional and city leagues which had dominated U.S. soccer. This brought the slow eclipse of the National Soccer League of Chicago as a major player in U.S. soccer. The collapse of the NASL in 1984 brought a brief resurgence to the NSL, but the founding of Major League Soccer in 1996, along with the merger of the A-League and USISL in 1997 to form the USL First Division led to the decline of the NSL. The league continues as a local recreational league, but its teams are no longer the competitive force on the national level they once were.

The NSL, in response to the COVID-19 pandemic in March 2020, cancelled the last two rounds of matches in indoor play as well as the playoffs. Later, the outdoor season would be cancelled as well. This marked the first time in the NSL's century-long history since World War II a season would not be played.

In 2023 the NSL and the competing Metropolitan Soccer League were officially merged as the Greater Chicago Soccer League, with the teams playing a common schedule in March before a formal merger happened in December, with the accompanying change of name.

== Champions ==
=== International Soccer Football League ===
- 1922 Sparta Union
- 1923 Olympia
- 1928 Chicago Sparta
- 1930 Chicago Sparta
- 1931 Chicago Sparta
- 1932 Chicago Sparta
- 1933 Chicago Sparta
- 1934 Chicago Sparta
- 1935 Chicago Sparta
- 1936 Chicago Sparta

=== National Soccer League ===
Former logo of the National Soccer League

- 1938 Chicago Sparta
- 1944 Hakoah Center
- 1948 Viking AA
- 1949 A.A.C. Eagles
- 1950 A.A.C. Eagles
- 1951 Chicago Slovak
- 1952 Chicago Slovak
- 1953 Ukrainian Lions
- 1954 (tie) A.A.C. Eagles, Ukrainian Lions and Chicago Slovak
- 1955 Schwaben
- 1956 (tie) A.A.C. Eagles, Ukrainian Lions and Schwaben
- 1957 Schwaben
- 1958 Schwaben
- 1959 Schwaben
- 1960 Schwaben
- 1961 Maroons
- 1962 Maroons
- 1963 Schwaben
- 1964 Kickers
- 1965 Hansa
- 1966 Kickers
- 1967 Schwaben
- 1968 Kickers
- 1969 Olympic
- 1970 Olympic
- 1971 Croatans/Ukrainian Lions a.k.a. Chicago Lions SC (division winners)
- 1972 Maroons/Ukrainian Lions a.k.a. Chicago Lions SC (division winners)
- 1973 Croatian
- 1974 Ukrainian Lions a.k.a. Chicago Lions SC
- 1982 Schwaben
- 1990 Schwaben
- 1992 The Liths
- 2004 Winged Bull
- 2005 Jahbat F.C.
- 2006 RWB Adria
- 2007 RWB Adria
- 2008 Deportivo Meridienne
- 2009 Inferno SC
- 2010 RWB Adria
- 2011 RWB Adria
- 2012 RWB Adria
- 2013 Gazelle SC
- 2014 RWB Adria
- 2015 RWB Adria
- 2016 RWB Adria
- 2017 Viking AA
- 2018 RWB Adria & Gazelle SC co-champions
- 2019 RWB Adria
- 2020 season not played due to the COVID-19 pandemic
- 2021 RWB Adria
- 2022 RWB Adria
- 2023 Viking AA

=== Greater Chicago Soccer League ===
- 2024 RWB Adria
- 2025 Hellenic AC
- 2026 Ethos United

== Men's League Divisions ==
2026 Season
Division	Team
Premier Division	Ethos United
Premier Division	CKS Warta A
Premier Division	Gazelle SC
Premier Division	RWB Adria
Premier Division	Vikings AA
Premier Division	Hellenic AC
Premier Division	UASC Lions
Premier Division	Assur City FC
Major Division	Ethos United II
Major Division	Wings SC
Major Division	Macchu Picchu FC
Major Division	FC Force UA
Major Division	Chicago Ghost FC
Major Division	Das Magic
Major Division	Cross United FC
Major Division	PAC
Major Division	Stare Byki FC
Major Division	Winged Bull FC
City Division	Lakeview FC
City Division	Saideira FC
City Division	AFC Roscoe
City Division	SouthPond FC
City Division	Juanacatlan FC Gorillas
City Division	SJA Dunbar FC
City Division	Hrvat Chicago SC
City Division	DAPS FC
City Division	Urbano SC
