= 2025–26 Antigua and Barbuda Premier Division =

Football league season

Antigua and Barbuda Premier Division
- Season: 2025–26
- Dates: 25 October 2025 – 31 May 2026
- Country: Antigua and Barbuda
- Teams: 12
- Champions: Grenades
- Runner up: All Saints United
- Relegated: Attacking Saints; John Hughes; Ottos Rangers; Jennings United
- CFU Club Shield: Grenades
- Top goalscorer: Rakeem Joseph (36)
- Biggest home win: Old Road 14–0 Jennings United (25 April 2026)
- Biggest away win: Jennings United 0–8 Old Road (8 November 2025)
- Highest scoring: Old Road 14–0 Jennings United (25 April 2026)
- All statistics correct as of 31 July 2026.

The 2026 AFA Senior Male League season was the 53rd season of the Antigua and Barbuda Premier Division. The competition began on 25 October 2025 and concluded on 31 May 2026.

Grenades were the Antigua and Barbuda Premier Division champions, making it their second-ever Antiguan league title.

Rakeem Joseph won the league's golden boot with 36 goals during the season, marking the most ever in a single season since at least 2000.

== Teams ==
=== Team changes ===
▲ from 2024–25 First Division	▼ to 2025–26 First Division
Ottos Rangers; Jennings United	Five Islands; Parham

=== Stadia and locations ===
Team	Location	Stadium	Capacity
All Saints United	North Sound	Sir Vivian Richards Stadium	10,000
Attacking Saints	St. John's	Antigua Recreation Ground	9,000
Aston Villa	St. John's	Antigua Recreation Ground	9,000
Pigotts Bullets	Piggotts	Piggotts Sports Ground	100
Garden Stars	Piggots	ABFA Technical Centre	1,300
Green City	Bendals	Antigua State College Football Field	200
Grenades	St. John's	Antigua Recreation Ground	9,000
Jennings United	Piggots	ABFA Technical Centre	1,300
John Hughes	John Hughes	John Hughes Playing Field	200
Old Road	St. John's	Antigua Recreation Ground	9,000
Ottos Rangers	Piggots	ABFA Technical Centre	1,300
Potters Tigers	Potters Village	Potters Playing Field	100

== League table ==
Pos	Team	Pld	W	D	L	GF	GA	GD	Pts	Qualification or relegation
1	Grenades (C)	22	19	2	1	65	18	+47	59	Qualification for the CFU Club Shield
2	All Saints United	22	18	2	2	72	19	+53	56	
3	Aston Villa	22	14	2	6	69	43	+26	44	
4	Pigotts Bullets	22	12	3	7	40	25	+15	39	
5	Old Road	22	10	6	6	75	37	+38	36	
6	Potters Tigers	22	9	6	7	41	36	+5	33	
7	Garden Stars	22	8	7	7	48	40	+8	31	
8	Green City (O)	22	6	5	11	35	41	−6	23	Qualification for the Relegation playoffs
9	Attacking Saints (R)	22	7	2	13	37	49	−12	23	Relegation to First Division
10	John Hughes (R)	22	5	1	16	17	68	−51	16	Relegation to First Division
11	Ottos Rangers (R)	20	3	0	17	24	67	−43	9	Relegation to First Division
12	Jennings United (R)	22	2	0	20	10	90	−80	6	Relegation to First Division

Source: RSSSF
Rules for classification: At end of season: 1) Points; 2) Goal difference; 3) Goals scored; 4) Head-to-head points; 5) Head-to-head goal difference; 6) Head-to-head goals scored; 7) Head-to-head away goals scored; 8) Play-off match or matches; 9) Penalty shoot-out (if the play-off match or matches end in a draw)
(C) Champions; (O) Play-off winners; (R) Relegated

== Postseason ==
=== Relegation playoffs ===
==== Fixtures and results ====
23 May 2026

SAP	2–3	Swetes
Lyne Adrian 65'; Emerson Henry 90+2'	Report	Tnoy Andrew 40'; Shalon Knight 47'; Kaijah Matthew 49'

ABFA Technical Centre, Piggots

27 May 2026

Green City	3–0	SAP
	Report

ABFA Technical Centre, Piggots

27 May 2026

Green City	1–1	Swetes
Ne-Quan Tanner 86' (o.g.)	Report	Kimoi Alexander 2'

ABFA Technical Centre, Piggots

==== Final table ====
Pos	Team	Pld	W	D	L	GF	GA	GD	Pts	Qualification or relegation
1	Green City (O)	2	1	1	0	4	1	+3	4	Promotion to Premier Division
2	Swetes	2	1	1	0	4	3	+1	4	Relegation to First Division
3	SAP	2	0	0	2	2	6	−4	0	Relegation to First Division

Source: RSSSF
Rules for classification: At end of season: 1) Points; 2) Goal difference; 3) Goals scored; 4) Head-to-head points; 5) Head-to-head goal difference; 6) Head-to-head goals scored; 7) Head-to-head away goals scored; 8) Play-off match or matches; 9) Penalty shoot-out (if the play-off match or matches end in a draw)
(O) Play-off winners

== Statistics ==
=== Top goalscorers ===
Rank	Player	Club	Goals
1	(United States Virgin Islands) Rakeem Joseph	Old Road	36
2	(Antigua and Barbuda) Raheem Deterville	All Saints United	29
3	(Antigua and Barbuda) Eroy Gonsalves	Aston Villa	15
4	(Antigua and Barbuda) Keon Greene	Potters Tigers	14
5	(Jamaica) Barrington Blake	Grenades	13
5	(Antigua and Barbuda) Jahtanie Barzey	Aston Villa	13
7	(Barbados) Kevon Lucas	Old Road	12
8	(Antigua and Barbuda) Akeem Isaac	Piggotts Bullets	11
9	(Antigua and Barbuda) Rick Gordon	Attacking Saints	10
9	(Haiti) Stanley Province	Grenades	10
9	(Saint Lucia) Obafemi Poyotte	Attacking Saints	10
