= 2012–13 Antigua and Barbuda Premier Division =

Antigua and Barbuda Premier Division
- Season: 2012–13

The 2012–13 Antigua and Barbuda Premier Division is the 45th season of the highest competitive football league of Antigua and Barbuda. Old Road FC are the defending champions having won their 1st championship last season. All games are played at the Antigua Recreation Ground.

== 2012-13 standings ==
1.Old Road          18  14  3  1  53-13  45  Champions
2.Hoppers           18  13  4  1  48-14  43
3.SAP               18  13  3  2  47-17  42
4.Parham            18   7  6  5  24-21  27
5.Bassa             18   8  2  8  25-24  26
6.All Saints United 18   8  1  9  40-35  25
7.Fort Road         18   5  0 13  25-43  15
8.Willikies         18   3  4 11  17-41  13  Relegation Playoff
9.Celtics           18   2  4 12  14-41  10  Relegated
10.Sea View Farm    18   3  1 14  14-58  10  Relegated

== Teams ==
Empire FC and Pigotts Bullets FC were relegated to the Antigua and Barbuda First Division after finishing in ninth and tenth place at the end of last season. They were replaced by the top two clubs from the First Division, Celtics FC and Virgin Atlantic Fort Road.

Bassa finished in 8th place last season and had to participate in a three-team playoff with the 3rd and 4th place teams of the First Division, Villa Lions FC and Ottos Rangers FC, for one spot in this competition. Bassa finished first after this playoff, thus retaining their spot in the league.

Team	City
All Saints United	All Saints
Bassa Sports Club	All Saints
Celtics FC	St. John's
Fort Road	St. John's
Hoppers	St. John's
Old Road FC	Old Road
Parham FC	Parham
SAP FC	Bolans
Sea View Farm FC	Sea View Farm
Willikies FC	St. John's
