= 2011–12 Antigua and Barbuda Premier Division =

Antigua and Barbuda Premier Division
- Season: 2011–12
- Matches: 34
- Goals: 110 (3.24 per match)
- Biggest home win: All Saints 6-1 Pigotts B. Old Road 7-2 Willikies
- Biggest away win: Empire 0-4 Old Road
- Highest scoring: Old Road 7-2 Willikies

The 2011–12 Antigua and Barbuda Premier Division (also known as the 2011–12 ABFA OBSERVER Group Premier Division for sponsoring purposes) is the 44th season of the highest competitive football league of Antigua and Barbuda. It began on 15 October 2011 and will conclude in March 2012. Parham FC are the defending champions having won their 3rd championship last season. All games are played at the Antigua Recreation Ground.

== Teams ==
Villa Lions FC and A&R Smitty FC were relegated to the Antigua and Barbuda First Division after finishing in ninth and tenth place at the end of last season. They were replaced by the top two clubs from the First Division, Willikies FC and Pigotts Bullets.

SAP FC finished in 8th place last season and had to participate in a three-team playoff with the 3rd and 4th place teams of the First Division, Potters FC and Swetes FC, for one spot in this competition. SAP finished first after this playoff, thus retaining their spot in the league.

Team	City
All Saints United	All Saints
Bassa Sports Club	All Saints
Empire FC	Gray's Farm
Hoppers	St. John's
Old Road FC	Old Road
Parham FC	Parham
Pigotts Bullets	Piggotts
SAP FC	Bolans
Sea View Farm FC	Sea View Farm
Willikies FC	

== League table ==
Pos	Team	Pld	W	D	L	GF	GA	GD	Pts	Qualification or relegation
1	Old Road FC (C)	18	13	3	2	37	16	+21	42	
2	All Saints United	18	10	3	5	33	21	+12	33	
3	Hoppers	18	8	7	3	33	23	+10	31	
4	Parham FC	18	8	5	5	31	22	+9	29	
5	SAP FC	18	8	3	7	27	26	+1	27	
6	Sea View Farm FC	18	6	4	8	19	24	−5	22	
7	Willikies FC	18	6	2	10	22	31	−9	20	
8	Bassa Sports Club	18	5	4	9	22	27	−5	19	Promotion/relegation playoffs
9	Empire FC (R)	18	3	6	9	12	22	−10	15	Relegation to Second level
10	Pigotts Bullets (R)	18	3	3	12	18	42	−24	12	Relegation to Second level

Updated to match(es) played on 22 February 2012. Source: Soccerway
Rules for classification: 1) points; 2) goal difference; 3) number of goals scored.
(C) Champions; (R) Relegated

== Results ==
Home \ Away	ALL	BAS	EMP	HOP	OLD	PAR	PIB	SAP	SEA	WIL
All Saints United		2–2	1–1	0–1	1–4	0–0	3–0	3–4	0–0	1–0
Bassa Sports Club	0–1		1–2	1–2	1–2	2–1	2–2	1–1	2–0	3–2
Empire FC	0–2	1–2		0–0	0–4	1–3	3–0	0–1	0–0	2–0
Hoppers	2–3	2–2	2–0		2–1	1–0	2–2	4–1	1–2	2–1
Old Road FC	0–1	1–0	2–0	2–2		1–1	1–0	2–0	2–1	7–2
Parham FC	1–2	2–0	1–1	3–3	3–1		3–1	0–3	2–0	1–2
Pigotts Bullets	1–6	2–1	2–1	0–3	1–2	3–3		3–2	0–1	0–2
SAP FC	4–2	2–0	0–0	2–3	1–1	2–0	3–0		2–0	0–3
Sea View Farm FC	1–3	2–1	1–1	1–1	1–2	1–3	1–0	0–1		4–1
Willikies FC	0–3	0–1	1–0	1–1	0–1	0–2	3–1	2–0	2–2	

Updated to match(es) played on 23 January 2012. Source: Soccerway
Legend: Blue = home team win; Yellow = draw; Red = away team win.

== Promotion/relegation playoffs ==
At the end of the year, the eighth-place finisher in the league will be in a three team round robin tournament with the 3rd and 4th place teams from the First Division. At the end of the playoff, the top team will be placed in next year's Premier Division while the other two will take part in the First Division.

Results:

March 2012

Bassa	2 – 1	Ottos Rangers

Antigua Recreation Ground, St. John's

11 March 2012

Bassa	2 – 2	Villa Lions
Josiah Lawrence; Troy Dublin	Report	Ayo Simon; Michael Roberts

Antigua Recreation Ground, St. John's

13 March 2012

Villa Lions	2 – 1	Ottos Rangers
Michael Roberts	Report	Shaquille Carr

Antigua Recreation Ground, St. John's

18 March 2012
21:30

Bassa	2 – 0	Villa Lions
Garry Barnes 31'; Roger Hurst 79'	Report

Antigua Recreation Ground, St. John's

Bassa retain his Premier Division level, while Villa Lions and Ottos Rangers still on the First Division.
