= 2019–20 Antigua and Barbuda Premier Division =

Antigua and Barbuda Premier Division
- Season: 2019–20

The 2019–20 Antigua and Barbuda Premier Division was the 49th season of the Antigua and Barbuda Premier Division, the top division football competition in Antigua and Barbuda. The season began on 26 October 2019, and was scheduled to conclude on 22 March 2020.

On 12 March 2020, the season was suspended due to concerns with the COVID-19 pandemic.

== Teams ==
Promoted from 2018–19 ABFA First Division	Relegated from 2018–19 ABFA Premier Division
All Saints United; Bullets; Ottos Rangers	Aston Villa; SAP; Tryum

== Table ==
Pos	Team	Pld	W	D	L	GF	GA	GD	Pts	Qualification or relegation
1	Grenades	16	9	4	3	29	19	+10	31	Qualification to Caribbean Club Shield
2	Hoppers	16	9	2	5	41	30	+11	29	
3	Ottos Rangers	16	6	6	4	24	25	−1	24	
4	Bullets	16	6	5	5	18	17	+1	23	
5	Swetes	16	6	4	6	29	24	+5	22	
6	Old Road	16	6	3	7	25	27	−2	21	
7	All Saints United	16	5	4	7	23	26	−3	19	
8	Liberta	16	4	6	6	26	28	−2	18	Qualification to relegation play-offs
9	Parham	16	3	7	6	24	33	−9	16	Relegation to the ABFA First Division
10	Five Islands	16	4	3	9	18	28	−10	15	Relegation to the ABFA First Division

Updated to match(es) played on 8 March 2020. Source: RSSSF

== Results ==
Home \ Away	ASU	BUL	FIV	GRN	HOP	LIB	OLD	OTT	PAR	SWE
All Saints United		0–1	1–1	1–1	TBA	2–0	1–0	2–3	3–3	1–0
Bullets	4–2		1–0	0–0	1–2	1–2	0–1	0–0	2–1	TBA
Five Islands	1–3	0–1			TBA	1–1	0–2	1–0	1–2	0–5
Grenades	3–1	3–1	0–2		3–1				2–0	3–2
Hoppers	4–2		2–1			2–4			2–1	
Liberta			4–0	2–2	0–2		2–3	1–1		2–1
Old Road		1–1		1–2	2–6			2–1		1–3
Ottos Rangers	2–1	2–1		0–2	4–2		1–1			
Parham	1–1		1–5			1–1	0–0	1–1		1–1
Swetes		0–1		3–1	1–1			1–1		

Updated to match(es) played on 8 March 2020. Source: Soccerway
Legend: Blue = home team win; Yellow = draw; Red = away team win.

== Stadiums ==
Team	Location	Stadium	Capacity
All Saints United			
Bullets			
Five Islands	Five Islands	Five Islands School Ground	200
Grenades	St. John's	Antigua Recreation Ground	9,000
Hoppers	St. John's	Antigua Recreation Ground	9,000
Liberta			
Old Road	St. John's	Antigua Recreation Ground	9,000
Ottos Rangers			
Parham	St. John's	Antigua Recreation Ground	9,000
Swetes			
