= 2017–18 Antigua and Barbuda Premier Division =

Premier Division
- Season: 2017–18
- Champions: Hoppers
- Relegated: Bullets; Empire
- Caribbean Club Shield: Hoppers
- Matches played: 90
- Goals scored: 265 (2.94 per match)
- Biggest home win: SAP 5–0 Tryum; 30 December 2018
- Biggest away win: SAP 1–5 Old Road; 9 January 2018; Empire 0–4 Grenades; 17 February 2018
- Highest scoring: Grenades 4–3 SAP; 18 November 2017; Swetes 5–2 SAP; 18 February 2018; Bullets 4–3 Parham; 4 March 2018

The 2017–18 Antigua and Barbuda Premier Division was the 47th season of the Antigua and Barbuda top-flight football league. The season began on 12 November 2017 and ended on 18 March 2018.

Hoppers won their second title, and their first since 2016, after defeating Parham, 1–0, on the final match day.

== Clubs ==
Team	Home city	Home ground
Bullets	Piggotts	Pigotts Sports Ground
Empire	St. John's	Antigua Recreation Ground
Five Islands	Five Islands	Five Islands School Ground
Grenades	St. John's	Antigua Recreation Ground
Hoppers	St. John's	Antigua Recreation Ground
Old Road	Old Road	Old Road Recreation Ground
Parham	Parham	Parham Field
SAP	St. John's	Antigua Recreation Ground
Swetes		
Tryum	St. John's	Antigua Recreation Ground

== Standings ==
Final table.

Pos	Team	Pld	W	D	L	GF	GA	GD	Pts	Qualification
1	Hoppers (C)	18	11	4	3	29	23	+6	37	Qualify for the 2019 CONCACAF Caribbean Club Shield
2	Five Islands	18	10	5	3	35	17	+18	35	
3	Parham	18	8	4	6	31	23	+8	28	
4	Grenades	18	7	5	6	27	24	+3	26	
5	Tryum	18	7	5	6	25	30	−5	26	
6	Swetes	18	5	7	6	27	26	+1	22	
7	SAP	18	5	6	7	25	33	−8	21	
8	Old Road (Q)	18	5	5	8	28	29	−1	20	Qualify for the Relegation playoffs
9	Bullets (R)	18	5	4	9	17	24	−7	19	Relegation to the ABFA First Division
10	Empire (R)	18	3	3	12	21	36	−15	12	Relegation to the ABFA First Division

Source: FIFA
(C) Champions; (Q) Qualified for the phase indicated; (R) Relegated

== Relegation playoffs ==
The eighth placed team in the Premier Division (Old Road) played a single round robin with the third and fourth placed teams from the First Division (Fort Road and Willikies, respectively). The winner of the round robin earned the right to play in the following years Premier Division, while the remaining teams would play in the First Division. At the end of playoffs, Old Road retained their spot in the Premier Division, and Fort Road and Willikies returned to the First Division.

Pos	Team	Pld	W	D	L	GF	GA	GD	Pts	
1	Old Road	2	2	0	0	4	1	+3	6	2018–19 Antigua and Barbuda Premier Division
2	Fort Road	2	1	0	1	5	2	+3	3	2018–19 Antigua and Barbuda First Division
3	Willikies	2	0	0	2	0	6	−6	0	2018–19 Antigua and Barbuda First Division

Source: RSSSF
