= 2010–11 Antigua and Barbuda Premier Division =

Antigua and Barbuda Premier Division
- Season: 2010–11
- Champions: Parham (3rd title)
- Relegated: Villa Lions; Smitty
- Matches: 90
- Goals: 289 (3.21 per match)
- Biggest home win: Parham 6-0 Empire
- Biggest away win: SAP 0-5 Parham
- Highest scoring: Empire 6-1 Hoppers; All Saints 3-4 Empire; Smitty 2-5 SAP; SAP 2-5 Hoppers
- Longest winning run: 5 matches: Hoppers & Old Road
- Longest unbeaten run: 10 matches: Old Road
- Longest winless run: 12 matches: Smitty
- Longest losing run: 6 matches: Smitty

The 2010–11 Antigua and Barbuda Premier Division (also known as the 2010–11 Digicel and Observer Group Premier Division for sponsoring purposes) is the 43rd season of the highest competitive football league of Antigua and Barbuda. It began on 19 September 2010 and will conclude on 14 February 2011. Bassa are the defending champions. All games are played at the Antigua Recreation Ground.

== Teams ==
Willikies FC and Potters FC were relegated to the Antigua and Barbuda First Division after finishing in ninth and tenth place at the end of last season. They were replaced by the top two clubs from the First Division, Empire FC and Sea View Farm FC.

| Team | City |
|---|---|
| A&R Smitty FC | St. John's |
| All Saints United | All Saints |
| Bassa Sports Club | All Saints |
| Empire FC | Gray's Farm |
| Hoppers FC | St. John's |
| Old Road FC | Old Road |
| Parham FC | Parham |
| SAP FC | Bolans |
| Sea View Farm FC | Sea View Farm |
| Villa Lions FC | St. John's |

== League table ==
| Pos | Team | Pld | W | D | L | GF | GA | GD | Pts | Qualification or relegation |
|---|---|---|---|---|---|---|---|---|---|---|
| 1 | Parham FC (C) | 18 | 12 | 2 | 4 | 49 | 17 | +32 | 38 | |
| 2 | Hoppers | 18 | 11 | 2 | 5 | 33 | 25 | +8 | 35 | |
| 3 | Old Road FC | 18 | 9 | 5 | 4 | 30 | 18 | +12 | 32 | |
| 4 | Empire FC | 18 | 7 | 3 | 8 | 31 | 34 | −3 | 24 | |
| 5 | Bassa Sports Club | 18 | 5 | 8 | 5 | 32 | 30 | +2 | 23 | |
| 6 | Sea View Farm FC | 18 | 5 | 8 | 5 | 21 | 22 | −1 | 23 | |
| 7 | All Saints United | 18 | 6 | 4 | 8 | 33 | 33 | 0 | 22 | |
| 8 | SAP FC (O) | 18 | 6 | 4 | 8 | 25 | 39 | −14 | 22 | Promotion/relegation playoffs |
| 9 | Villa Lions FC (R) | 18 | 5 | 5 | 8 | 19 | 22 | −3 | 20 | Relegation to second level |
| 10 | A&R Smitty FC (R) | 18 | 1 | 5 | 12 | 16 | 49 | −33 | 8 | Relegation to second level |

Source: Soccerway
Rules for classification: 1) points; 2) goal difference; 3) number of goals scored.
(C) Champions; (O) Play-off winners; (R) Relegated

== Results ==
| Home \ Away | ARS | ALL | BAS | EMP | HOP | OLD | PAR | SAP | SEA | VIL |
|---|---|---|---|---|---|---|---|---|---|---|
| A&R Smitty FC | | 3–3 | 0–4 | 0–3 | 1–3 | 1–5 | 1–5 | 2–5 | 1–0 | 0–3 |
| All Saints United | 4–1 | | 0–3 | 3–4 | 2–3 | 1–2 | 3–1 | 2–2 | 1–1 | 4–0 |
| Bassa Sports Club | 0–0 | 1–3 | | 3–3 | 3–3 | 1–1 | 1–4 | 3–0 | 2–3 | 0–0 |
| Empire FC | 2–1 | 3–1 | 4–0 | | 6–1 | 0–3 | 1–5 | 1–2 | 1–2 | 0–2 |
| Hoppers | 4–0 | 1–0 | 2–1 | 2–0 | | 3–1 | 0–1 | 5–2 | 1–1 | 2–1 |
| Old Road FC | 0–0 | 3–0 | 1–2 | 0–0 | 4–1 | | 2–1 | 0–1 | 1–1 | 2–0 |
| Parham FC | 3–1 | 0–2 | 3–3 | 6–0 | 1–0 | 4–0 | | 5–1 | 0–1 | 0–0 |
| SAP FC | 2–2 | 3–1 | 1–1 | 2–0 | 1–0 | 1–3 | 0–5 | | 1–1 | 0–3 |
| Sea View Farm FC | 1–1 | 0–0 | 2–2 | 1–3 | 0–1 | 0–1 | 2–4 | 2–1 | | 2–0 |
| Villa Lions FC | 2–1 | 2–3 | 1–3 | 0–0 | 0–1 | 1–1 | 0–2 | 3–0 | 1–1 | |

Source: Soccerway
Legend: Blue = home team win; Yellow = draw; Red = away team win.

== Promotion/relegation playoffs ==
At the end of the year SAP FC will be in a three team round robin tournament with the 3rd and 4th place teams from the First Division. These two First Division teams will be Potters FC and Swetes FC, while Willikies FC and Bullets FC were promoted directly to the Premier Division.

Results:

6 March 2011

| Potters FC | 0 – 0 | SAP FC |

Antigua Recreation Ground, St. John's

8 March 2011

| Swetes FC | 1 – 2 | Potters FC |
|---|---|---|
| Weeks 18' | | 20' (pen.) Ochoa (??) Benjamin |

Antigua Recreation Ground, St. John's

10 March 2011

| SAP FC | 9 – 0 | Swetes FC |
|---|---|---|
| Challenger 15' (pen.); Thomas 25', 42', 66'; Roberts 48'; Murray 57', 70'; Williamson 72'; Parker 88' | | (red card) ??' Decastro; (red card) ??' Goodwin; (red card) ??' Mason |

Antigua Recreation Ground, St. John's

SAP (4 points, +9 goal difference) remains in the Premier Division. Potters (4 points, +1 goal difference) and Swetes (0 points, -10 goal difference) remain in the First Division.
