= 2015–16 Antigua and Barbuda Premier Division =

Antigua and Barbuda Premier Division
- Season: 2015–16
- Champions: Hoppers
- Relegated: Fort Road; Five Islands
- CFU Club Championship: Hoppers; Grenades
- Biggest home win: Parham 7–0 Five Islands
- Biggest away win: Fort Road 1–4 Grenades
- Highest scoring: Fort Road 3–6 Ottos Rangers

The 2015–16 Antigua and Barbuda Premier Division was the 45th season of the competition. Hoppers won the title.

== Table ==
Pos	Team	Pld	W	D	L	GF	GA	GD	Pts	Qualification or relegation
1	Hoppers	18	13	2	3	41	16	+25	41	Qualification for 2017 CFU Club Championship
2	Grenades	18	11	3	4	33	19	+14	36	
3	Empire	18	9	5	4	34	26	+8	32	
4	Old Road	18	9	3	6	38	24	+14	30	
5	Parham	18	9	3	6	36	23	+13	30	
6	SAP	18	7	4	7	36	31	+5	25	
7	Pigotts Bullets	18	5	6	7	23	28	−5	21	
8	Ottos Rangers	18	6	3	9	30	38	−8	21	Qualification for Relegation playoffs
9	Fort Road	18	3	2	13	18	46	−28	11	Relegation to ABFA First Division
10	Five Islands	18	1	3	14	15	53	−38	6	Relegation to ABFA First Division

Source: RSSSF
