= 2016–17 Antigua and Barbuda Premier Division =

Premier Division
- Season: 2016–17
- Champions: Parham
- Relegated: Liberta; Glanvilles
- Matches: 90
- Goals: 292 (3.24 per match)
- Biggest away win: Liberta 0–7 Hoppers (16 Oct 2016)
- Highest scoring: Old Road 8–3 Tryum (29 Jan 2017)
- All statistics correct as of 25 April 2017.

The 2016–17 Antigua and Barbuda Premier Division was the 46th season of the Antigua and Barbuda top-flight football league. The league consists of 10 clubs that play 18 matches with a two-match series against every other club. The season began on 15 October 2016 and concluded on 19 February 2017.

Parham won the league title amassing the best record after 18 matches. It was the club's fifth title.

== Clubs ==
Team	Home city	Home ground
Empire	St. John's	Antigua Recreation Ground
Glanvilles	St. John's	Antigua Recreation Ground
Grenades	St. John's	Antigua Recreation Ground
Hoppers	St. John's	Antigua Recreation Ground
Liberta	St. John's	Antigua Recreation Ground
Old Road	Old Road	Old Road Recreation Ground
Parham	Parham	Parham Field
Pigotts Bullets	Piggotts	Pigotts Sports Ground
SAP	St. John's	Antigua Recreation Ground
Tryum	St. John's	Antigua Recreation Ground

== Table ==
Pos	Team	Pld	W	D	L	GF	GA	GD	Pts	Qualification or relegation
1	Parham (C)	18	14	2	2	45	15	+30	44	2018 Caribbean Club Championship (Note: The champions of the Antigua and Barbuda Premier Division were eligible to enter the 2017 Caribbean Club Shield. However, the Dominica FA elected not to send any teams to the competition, meaning that Parham did not participate.)
2	Hoppers	18	11	4	3	41	16	+25	37	
3	Grenades	18	10	6	2	33	19	+14	36	
4	Old Road	18	9	5	4	40	27	+13	32	
5	Empire	18	6	5	7	31	29	+2	23	
6	Pigotts Bullets	18	7	2	9	22	27	−5	23	
7	Tryum	18	5	4	9	23	35	−12	19	
8	SAP (O)	18	5	3	10	24	33	−9	18	Relegation play-offs
9	Liberta (R)	18	4	0	14	15	46	−31	12	2017–18 Antigua and Barbuda First Division
10	Glanvilles (R)	18	2	3	13	18	45	−27	9	2017–18 Antigua and Barbuda First Division

Updated to match(es) played on 25 April 2017.
Source: https://www.rsssf.org/tablesa/antig2017.html
(C) Champions;
(O) Play-off winners;
(R) Relegated
