= 2018–19 Antigua and Barbuda Premier Division =

Antigua and Barbuda Premier Division
- Season: 2018–19
- Champions: Liberta
- Relegated: SAP; Aston Villa
- Caribbean Club Shield: Liberta
- Matches: 24
- Goals: 71 (2.96 per match)
- Biggest home win: Swetes 4–1 Five Islands (4 November 2018); Grenades 3–0 SAP (26 November 2018); Five Islands 6–1 SAP (2 December 2018)
- Biggest away win: Aston Villa 1–5 Hoppers (1 December 2018)
- Highest scoring: Tyrum 3–4 Swetes (25 November)

The 2018–19 Antigua and Barbuda Premier Division was the 48th season of the Antigua and Barbuda Premier Division, the top division football competition in Antigua and Barbuda. The season began on 27 October 2018.

Liberta were the champions.

== Clubs ==
Team	Home city	Home ground
Aston Villa	St John's	Antigua Recreation Ground
Five Islands	Five Islands	Five Islands School Ground
Grenades	St. John's	Antigua Recreation Ground
Hoppers	St. John's	Antigua Recreation Ground
Liberta	Liberta	Kennedy's Sports Complex
Old Road	Old Road	Old Road Recreation Ground
Parham	Parham	Parham Field
SAP	Bolans	Antigua Recreation Ground
Swetes	Swetes	Antigua Recreation Ground
Tryum	St. John's	Antigua Recreation Ground

== League table ==
Pos	Team	Pld	W	D	L	GF	GA	GD	Pts	Qualification or relegation
1	Liberta (C)	18	10	4	4	27	14	+13	34	Caribbean Club Shield
2	Hoppers	18	10	3	5	36	25	+11	33	
3	Grenades	18	10	2	6	25	17	+8	32	
4	Old Road	18	10	1	7	35	22	+13	31	
5	Parham	18	8	2	8	27	29	−2	26	
6	Swetes	18	6	6	6	38	34	+4	24	
7	Five Islands	18	7	3	8	27	29	−2	24	
8	Tryum (R)	18	5	5	8	24	29	−5	20	Relegation playoffs
9	SAP (R)	18	6	0	12	26	47	−21	18	Relegated to ABFA First Division
10	Aston Villa (R)	18	4	2	12	18	37	−19	14	Relegated to ABFA First Division

Source: Soccerway
(C) Champions; (R) Relegated
