= 2014–15 Antigua and Barbuda Premier Division =

Football league season

Premier Division
- Season: 2014–15
- Matches: 45
- Goals: 135 (3 per match)
- Highest scoring: Grenades 6-3 Old Road; Parham 8-1 Urlings Golden Stars
- Longest winning run: Parham; Grenades (6)
- Longest losing run: Five Islands (6)
- All statistics correct as of 15 December 2014.

The 2014–15 Antigua and Barbuda Premier Division will be the 44th season of the Antigua and Barbuda top-flight football league. The league consists of 10 clubs that play 18 matches with a two-match series against each other club.

== Teams ==
The league will be contested by 10 teams, including Ottos Rangers, Urlings Golden Stars and Five Islands, all of which were promoted from the 2013–14 Division 1. Willikies, All Saints United and Potters Tigers were each relegated. All games are played at Antigua Recreation Ground in St. John's. The stadium has a capacity of 9,000.

== League table ==
The season began on 20 September 2014, with Bassa and Old Road playing to a scoreless draw.

Pos	Team	Pld	W	D	L	GF	GA	GD	Pts	Qualification or relegation
1	Parham	18	15	2	1	45	7	+38	47	Advances to CFU Club Championship
2	Greenbay Hoppers	18	11	4	3	31	20	+11	37	Advances to CFU Club Championship
3	SAP	18	11	2	5	31	18	+13	35	
4	Grenades	18	9	1	8	35	35	0	28	
5	Fort Road	18	8	2	8	30	25	+5	26	
6	Ottos Rangers	18	6	3	9	23	24	−1	21	
7	Old Road	18	6	3	9	28	33	−5	21	
8	Five Islands	18	5	4	9	20	28	−8	19	Relegation play-off
9	Bassa	18	3	6	9	12	24	−12	15	Relegation to 2015–16 Division 1
10	Urlings Golden Stars	18	2	1	15	12	53	−41	7	Relegation to 2015–16 Division 1

Updated to match(es) played on 15 December 2014. Source: - UNAFUT.com
Rules for classification: 1) points; 2) goal difference; 3) number of goals scored.

=== Results ===
Home \ Away	BSC	FIV	FOR	GBH	GRE	OLD	OTT	PAR	SAP	UGS
Bassa		0–0	0–0	0–2	1–3	0–0	1–1	1–2	1–0	2–1
Five Islands	0–0		3–2	0–0	0–2	3–4	1–0	0–0	0–2	2–1
Fort Road	3–1	4–0		1–2	1–5	1–2	2–0	0–2	0–3	0–0
Greenbay Hoppers	2–0	4–3	1–5		2–3	1–1	0–0	1–1	2–1	3–0
Grenades	2–0	0–3	1–2	2–3		6–3	1–0	0–1	2–5	3–1
Old Road	0–1	1–0	1–2	1–2	5–1		3–2	0–4	1–1	4–0
Ottos Rangers	3–3	1–0	2–0	0–2	2–0	3–0		0–3	0–1	3–0
Parham	2–1	5–0	3–0	2–0	3–0	3–1	1–0		1–0	8–1
SAP	2–0	2–0	2–1	0–1	2–2	2–1	4–1	1–0		3–2
Urlings Golden Stars	1–0	0–5	0–3	0–3	1–2	1–0	2–5	1–4	0–3	

Updated to match(es) played on 15 December 2014. Source: 2014–15 Antigua and Barbuda Premier Division
Legend: Blue = home team win; Yellow = draw; Red = away team win.

== Season Statistics ==
=== Hat-tricks ===
Player	For	Against	Result	Date
(Antigua and Barbuda) Rakeem Henry	Grenades	Old Road	6–3	27 September 2014
(Antigua and Barbuda) Gayson Gregory	Parham	Urlings Golden Stars	8–1	3 October 2014
(Antigua and Barbuda) Tavaughn Harriette	Parham	Old Road	3–1	19 October 2014
(Antigua and Barbuda) Okeem Challenger	SAP	Grenades	2–5	6 December 2014

Updated on 15 December 2014
