= Oalex Anderson =

Vincentian footballer (born 1995)

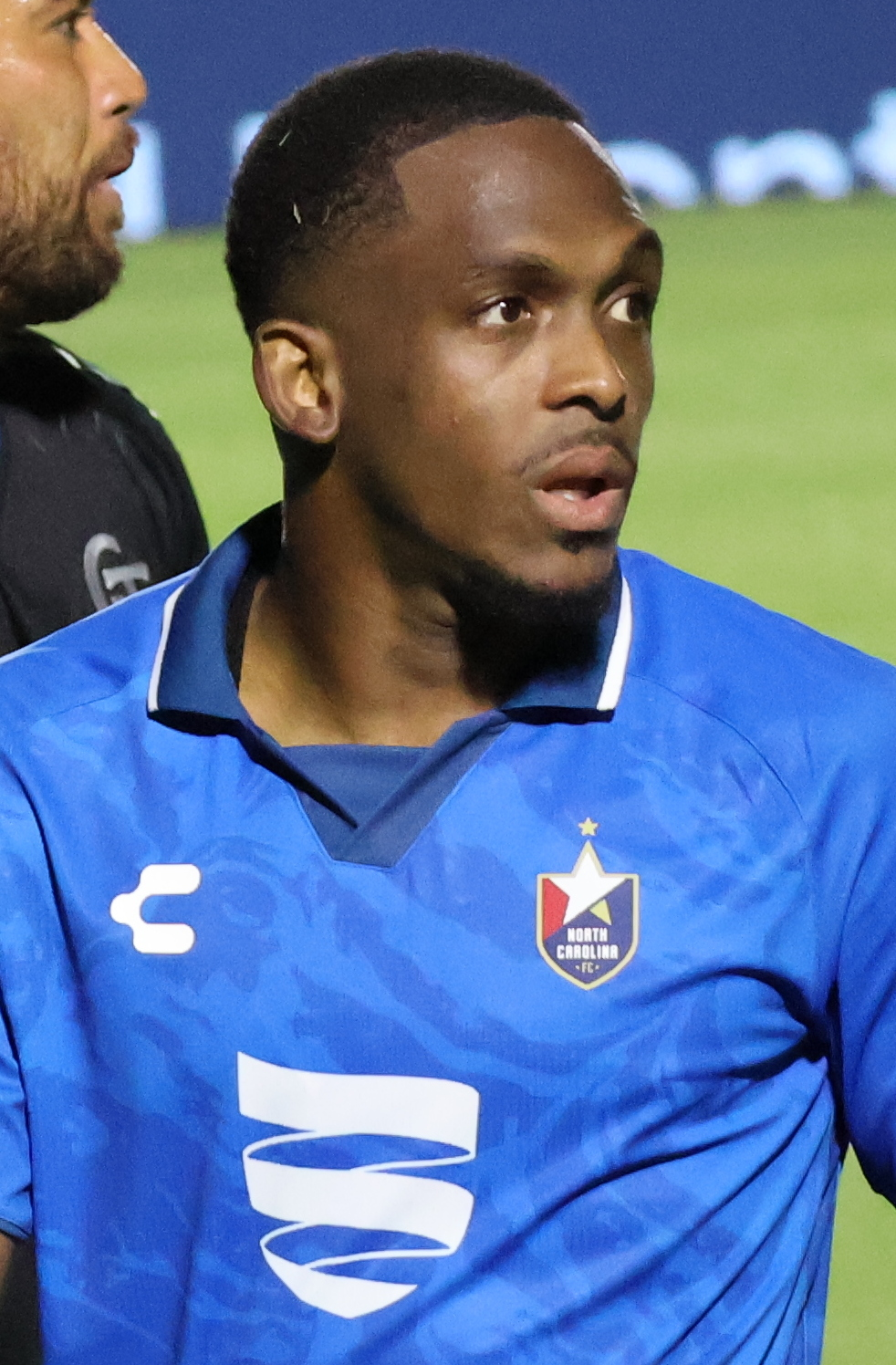
- Anderson with North Carolina FC in 2025

Personal information
- Date of birth: 11 November 1995 (age 31)
- Place of birth: Barrouallie, Saint Vincent and the Grenadines
- Height: 1.73 m (5 ft 8 in)
- Position: Centre forward

Team information
- Current team: Las Vegas Lights
- Number: 25

Senior career*
Years	Team	Apps	(Gls)
2013–2015	System 3 FC		
2014–2015	→ Grenades FC (loan)	18	(12)
2015	Seattle Sounders FC 2	16	(4)
2016	Seattle Sounders FC	15	(0)
2016	→ Seattle Sounders FC 2 (loan)	2	(1)
2019–2020	System 3 FC		
2020–2021	Richmond Kickers	30	(5)
2022–2025	North Carolina FC	106	(41)
2026–	Las Vegas Lights	21	(11)

International career^{‡}
2014–	Saint Vincent and the Grenadines	59	(34)
- * Club domestic league appearances and goals as of 10:21, 9 November 2026 (UTC) ‡ National team caps and goals as of 14:30, 17 November 2026 (UTC)

Oalex Anderson (born 11 November 1995) is a Vincentian professional footballer who plays for Las Vegas Lights FC in USL Championship and the Saint Vincent and the Grenadines national team. Anderson is known by the nickname "Bounty" for his prolific goal scoring.

== Club career ==
Anderson has played for System 3 FC of the NLA Premier League, the top tier of football in Saint Vincent and the Grenadines. Anderson was the league's top scorer for the 2013/2014 season. In September 2014, System 3 loaned Anderson to Grenades FC of the Antigua and Barbuda Premier Division, along with national teammate Kevin Francis, on 6-month deals. Only days later, Anderson scored his first goal for the club on 27 September 2014 in a 6–3 league victory over Old Road FC on his league debut. During his time with the club, Anderson appeared in 18 matches, finishing second in the league with 12 goals.

Anderson joined USL club Seattle Sounders FC 2, of which fellow Vincentian Ezra Hendrickson was coach, in March 2015. He made his debut for the club on 11 April 2015, in a 2–1 victory over Portland Timbers 2 as an 82nd-minute substitute for Aaron Kovar. The score was tied 1–1 as he made his entrance but minutes later, he was taken down in the box for a penalty which Pablo Rossi converted to give S2 the victory. Anderson scored his first goal for the club on 15 May 2015, the game-winner of a 3–1 victory over Oklahoma City Energy. On 12 July 2015, Anderson scored his first brace for the club before being carted off with an injury in the 30th minute as Sounders 2 beat Arizona United, 4–0. Anderson's 2nd-minute first goal was, at that point, the fastest goal in club history. For his efforts, Anderson was named to the USL's Team of the Week.

On 4 December 2015, it was announced that Anderson would return to S2 for the 2016 USL season, along with international teammate Myron Samuel. It was announced on 1 March 2016 that Anderson had been signed by the Seattle Sounders FC of Major League Soccer. That year the club won its first MLS Cup. Following the 2016 season, it was announced that the club would not extend Anderson's contract.

After a four year gaps because of a serious injury, Anderson signed with the Richmond Kickers on August 31, 2020.

Anderson signed with North Carolina FC on 18 January 2022. During the 2023 season, Anderson finished as the team's top goal scorer with 17 goals en route to victory in the 2023 USL League One Final. On 26 October 2024, Anderson became the club's all-time top goal scorer after scoring the winning goal against Las Vegas Lights FC, helping his team clinch a spot in the 2024 USL Championship playoffs in the process.

On 4 March 2026, Las Vegas Lights announced they had signed Anderson to a contract for the 2026 USL Championship season.

== International career ==
Anderson made his international debut on 2 February 2014 in a friendly against Dominica. After a strong start to his international career, Anderson was named to the squad for the 2014 Windward Islands Tournament and 2014 Caribbean Cup qualification. Anderson went on to score two goals during the Windwards Islands Tournament and five during Caribbean Cup qualification before SVG were eliminated, making him ranked among the top goal scorers during qualification.

In May 2015, Anderson was called up for two Under-23 matches against Dominica in 2015 CONCACAF Men's Olympic Qualifying Championship qualification and two matches with the senior squad against Guyana as part of its opening round of 2018 FIFA World Cup qualification. Anderson scored a goal and was named team captain for the opening U23 match as SVG won 2–0. Anderson scored again in the second fixture, a 3–0 victory, sending SVG to the next round of qualification. Anderson was called up to the U23 squad again in August 2015 for matches against Haiti in the final round of qualification.

== Career statistics ==
=== International ===
International appearances and goals
No.	Date	Venue	Opponent	Result^{†}	Competition	Goal
2014
1	7 February	Sion Hill Playing Field, Kingstown, Saint Vincent and the Grenadines	Dominica	3–2	Friendly	
2	9 February	Sion Hill Playing Field, Kingstown, Saint Vincent and the Grenadines	Dominica	0–0	Friendly	
3	30 April	Windsor Park, Roseau, Dominica	Grenada	0–0	2014 Windward Islands Tournament	
4	2 May	Windsor Park, Roseau, Dominica	Dominica	3–2	2014 Windward Islands Tournament	2 (2)
5	4 May	Windsor Park, Roseau, Dominica	Saint Lucia	0–0	2014 Windward Islands Tournament	
6	3 September	Antigua Recreation Ground, St. John's, Antigua and Barbuda	Dominican Republic	1–0	2014 Caribbean Cup qualification	1 (3)
7	5 September	Antigua Recreation Ground, St. John's, Antigua and Barbuda	Anguilla	4–0	2014 Caribbean Cup qualification	2 (5)
8	7 September	Antigua Recreation Ground, St. John's, Antigua and Barbuda	Antigua and Barbuda	1–2	2014 Caribbean Cup qualification	
9	8 October	Stade René Serge Nabajoth, Les Abymes, Guadeloupe	Guadeloupe	1–3	2014 Caribbean Cup qualification	
10	10 October	Stade René Serge Nabajoth, Les Abymes, Guadeloupe	Curaçao	1–0	2014 Caribbean Cup qualification	1 (6)
11	12 October	Stade René Serge Nabajoth, Les Abymes, Guadeloupe	Martinique	3–4	2014 Caribbean Cup qualification	1 (7)
2015
12	6 March	Barbados National Stadium, St. Michael, Barbados	Barbados	1–3	Friendly	
13	8 March	Barbados National Stadium, St. Michael, Barbados	Barbados	2–2	Friendly	
14	10 June	Arnos Vale Stadium, Arnos Vale, Saint Vincent and the Grenadines	Guyana	2–2	2018 FIFA World Cup qualification	
15	14 June	Providence Stadium, Providence, Guyana	Guyana	4–4	2018 FIFA World Cup qualification	1 (8)
16	28 August	Arnos Vale Stadium, Arnos Vale, Saint Vincent and the Grenadines	Barbados	2–2	Friendly	
17	4 September	Arnos Vale Stadium, Arnos Vale, Saint Vincent and the Grenadines	Aruba	2–0	2018 FIFA World Cup qualification	1 (9)
18	8 September	Trinidad Stadium, Oranjestad, Aruba	Aruba	1–2	2018 FIFA World Cup qualification	
19	4 November	Arnos Vale Stadium, Arnos Vale, Saint Vincent and the Grenadines	Antigua and Barbuda	2–1	Friendly	
20	13 November	Busch Stadium, St. Louis, United States	United States	1–6	2018 FIFA World Cup qualification	1 (10)
21	17 November	Arnos Vale Stadium, Arnos Vale, Saint Vincent and the Grenadines	Guatemala	0–4	2018 FIFA World Cup qualification	
2016
22	25 March	Arnos Vale Stadium, Arnos Vale, Saint Vincent and the Grenadines	Trinidad and Tobago	2–3	2018 FIFA World Cup qualification	
23	29 March	Hasely Crawford Stadium, Port of Spain, Trinidad and Tobago	Trinidad and Tobago	0–6	2018 FIFA World Cup qualification	
24	2 September	Arnos Vale Stadium, Arnos Vale, Saint Vincent and the Grenadines	United States	0–6	2018 FIFA World Cup qualification	
25	6 September	Estadio Mateo Flores, Guatemala City, Guatemala	Guatemala	3–9	2018 FIFA World Cup qualification	2 (12)
2019
26	5 September	Nicaragua National Football Stadium, Managua, Nicaragua	Nicaragua	1–1	2019–20 CONCACAF Nations League B	1 (13)
27	11 October	Arnos Vale Stadium, Arnos Vale, Saint Vincent and the Grenadines	Suriname	2–2	2019–20 CONCACAF Nations League B	
28	14 October	André Kamperveen Stadion, Paramaribo, Suriname	Suriname	1–0	2019–20 CONCACAF Nations League B	
29	15 November	Arnos Vale Stadium, Arnos Vale, Saint Vincent and the Grenadines	Nicaragua	1–0	2019–20 CONCACAF Nations League B	
2021
30	25 March	Stadion dr. Antoine Maduro, Willemstad, Curaçao	Curaçao	0–5	2022 FIFA World Cup qualification	
31	30 March	Ergilio Hato Stadium, Willemstad, Curaçao	British Virgin Islands	3–0	2022 FIFA World Cup qualification	1 (14)
2022
32	6 June	Arnos Vale Stadium, Arnos Vale, Saint Vincent and the Grenadines	Nicaragua	2–2	2022–23 CONCACAF Nations League B	1 (15)
2023
33	24 March	Nicaragua National Football Stadium, Managua, Nicaragua	Nicaragua	1–4	2022–23 CONCACAF Nations League B	
34	27 March	Arnos Vale Stadium, Arnos Vale, Saint Vincent and the Grenadines	Bahamas	1–1	2022–23 CONCACAF Nations League B	
35	12 September	Arnos Vale Stadium, Arnos Vale, Saint Vincent and the Grenadines	Bermuda	4–3	2023–24 CONCACAF Nations League B	3 (18)
36	13 October	Arnos Vale Stadium, Arnos Vale, Saint Vincent and the Grenadines	French Guiana	1–4	2023–24 CONCACAF Nations League B	
37	16 October	Stade Pierre-Aliker, Fort-de-France, Martinique	French Guiana	2–3	2023–24 CONCACAF Nations League B	
38	21 November	Kirani James Athletic Stadium, St. George's, Grenada	Belize	3–0	2023–24 CONCACAF Nations League B	
2024
39	5 June	Dr. Ir. Franklin Essed Stadion, Paramaribo, Suriname	Suriname	1–4	2026 FIFA World Cup qualification	1 (19)
40	9 June	Dr. Ir. Franklin Essed Stadion, Paramaribo, Suriname	El Salvador	1–3	2026 FIFA World Cup qualification	1 (20)
2025
50	6 October	Arnos Vale Stadium, Arnos Vale, Saint Vincent and the Grenadines	Cuba	7–0	Friendly	1 (25)
51	9 October	Arnos Vale Stadium, Arnos Vale, Saint Vincent and the Grenadines	Cuba	1–0	Friendly	1 (26)
52	12 November	Estadio Cibao FC, Santiago, Dominican Republic	Dominican Republic	0–2	Friendly	
53	15 November	Estadio Cibao FC, Santiago, Dominican Republic	Saint Lucia	3–1	Friendly	1 (27)
2026
54	26 March	Stadion Antonio Trenidat, Rincon, Bonaire	Bonaire	1–3	Friendly	
55	29 March	Stadion Antonio Trenidat, Rincon, Bonaire	Barbados	3–2	Friendly	1 (28)
56	26 September	FFB Stadium, Belmopan, Belize	French Guiana	2–1	2026–27 CONCACAF Nations League B	2 (30)
57	2 October	FFB Stadium, Belmopan, Belize	Sint Maarten	4–2	2026–27 CONCACAF Nations League B	3 (33)
58	6 October	FFB Stadium, Belmopan, Belize	Sint Maarten	4–0	2026–27 CONCACAF Nations League B	1 (34)
59	17 November	Arnos Vale Stadium, Arnos Vale, Saint Vincent and the Grenadines	French Guiana	0–1	2026–27 CONCACAF Nations League B	
^{†}Saint Vincent and the Grenadines' goal tally first.

== Honours ==
- NLA Premier League Golden Boot: 2013–14
- Antigua and Barbuda Premier Division Golden Boot runner-up: 2014–15
- Major League Soccer MLS Cup: 2016
- USL League One Championship: 2023
