= Ronaldo Viana =

Brazilian footballer

Personal information
- Full name: Ronaldo Aparecido Viana
- Date of birth: 7 January 1979 (age 47)
- Place of birth: Vera Cruz do Oeste, Brazil
- Position: Midfielder

Senior career*
Years	Team	Apps	(Gls)
2002–2003	W Connection		
2004	→ Železnik (loan)		
2005–2008	W Connection		
2009	Trindade		
2010	San Juan Jabloteh	4	(1)
2010–2013	Parham		
2013–2014	San Juan Jabloteh		
- * Club domestic league appearances and goals

Ronaldo Aparecido Viana, known as Ronaldo Viana (born 7 January 1979) is a Brazilian former professional footballer who played as a midfielder.

== Career ==
Born in Vera Cruz do Oeste, he played with W Connection between 2002 and 2008. During the winter of the 2003–04 season, he was loaned to Serbian club FK Železnik along Gefferson Goulart. Both stayed till next winter, playing the second half of the 2003–04 and first half of the 2004–05 First League of Serbia and Montenegro seasons. He made two appearances in the 2004–05 season.

He spent some time back in Brazil after leaving W Connection in 2007 and he played with Trindade Atlético Clube during first semester of 2009. He then returned to Trinidad and Tobago and signed a 10-month deal with San Juan Jabloteh in April 2010. By September 2010 he moved to Antigua and Barbuda and signed a six-month deal with Parham. He played again with San Juan Jabloteh during the 2012–13 season.

== Honours ==
W Connection

- TT Pro League: 2005
- Trinidad and Tobago Cup: 2002

Železnik

- Serbia and Montenegro Cup: 2004–05

San Juan Jabloteh

- Trinidad and Tobago Cup: 2010–11

Parham

- Antigua and Barbuda Premier Division: 2010–11
- Antigua and Barbuda FA Cup: 2011–12
