= 2013 Antigua Barracuda FC season =

Antigua Barracuda FC
2013 season
- Owner: Gordon Derrick
- Manager: Adrian Whitbread
- Stadium: None
- USL Pro: 13th
- USL Pro Playoffs: Did not qualify
- Antigua and Barbuda FA Cup: Did not enter
- CFU Club Championship: Group stage
- Highest home attendance: N/A
- Lowest home attendance: N/A
- Average home league attendance: N/A
Home colours	Away colours

The 2013 Antigua Barracuda FC season was the club's third and final season in existence, playing in the USL Pro, which at the time was the third division in the United States soccer pyramid. The regular season began on 6 April 2013 and concluded on 31 August 2013.

During the 2013 season, Antigua Barracuda played all of their matches on the road, thus being a travelling team. The team became the first team in the history of United States soccer leagues to lose every single one of their matches, amassing a record of 0-26-0, scoring 11 goals and conceding 91.

Outside of USL Pro, Antigua Barracuda played in the 2013 CFU Club Championship, being a club based in a CFU-member nation. There, they finished in third place in their group, losing one match and tying another. Barracuda did not participate in the Antigua and Barbuda FA Cup, and did not qualify for the USL Pro Playoffs.

Following the conclusion of the 2013 season, Antigua Barracuda FC folded due to financial difficulties.

== Competitions ==
=== USL Pro ===
==== Table ====
Pos	Team	Pld	W	T	L	GF	GA	GD	Pts
9	Wilmington Hammerheads	26	11	4	11	35	39	−4	36 (Note: Wilmington were deducted one point for fielding an ineligible player on July 21 against Pittsburgh.)
10	VSI Tampa Bay	26	9	5	12	41	39	+2	32
11	Rochester Rhinos	26	6	10	10	25	39	−14	28
12	Phoenix FC	26	5	7	14	28	41	−13	22
13	Antigua Barracuda	26	0	0	26	11	91	−80	0

Source: USL Pro official standings
Rules for classification: 1) points; 2) goal difference; 3) number of goals scored.

==== Results summary ====
Overall								Home						Away					
Pld	W	D	L	GF	GA	GD	Pts	W	D	L	GF	GA	GD	W	D	L	GF	GA	GD
26	0	0	26	11	91	−80	0	0	0	0	0	0	0	0	0	26	11	91	−80

Source: Match reports

==== Results by round ====
Round	1	2	3	4	5	6	7	8	9	10	11	12	13	14	15	16	17	18	19	20	21	22	23	24	25	26
Ground	A	A	A	A	A	A	A	A	A	A	A	A	A	A	A	A	A	A	A	A	A	A	A	A	A	A
Result	L	L	L	L	L	L	L	L	L	L	L	L	L	L	L	L	L	L	L	L	L	L	L	L	L	L
Position	10	12	12	13	13	13	13	13	13	13	13	13	13	13	13	13	13	13	13	13	13	13	13	13	13	13

Source: Match reports
A = Away; H = Home; W = Win; D = Draw; L = Loss

==== Match reports ====
13 April 2013 1	Charlotte Eagles	2–0	Antigua Barracuda FC	Charlotte, NC, United States
20:00 ADT	Thornton 27'; Ramirez 85'	Report	Kirwan (yellow card) 40'	Stadium: Dickson Field; Attendance: 932; Referee: David McPhun

19 April 2013 2	Wilmington Hammerheads	2–0	Antigua Barracuda FC	Wilmington, NC, United States
20:00 ADT	Greig 49'; Nicholson 69'	Report		Stadium: Legion Field; Attendance: 3,213; Referee: Matthew Jozaitis

20 April 2013 3	Charleston Battery	4–0	Antigua Barracuda FC	Charleston, SC, United States
20:30 ADT	Cordoves 21'; Fisk 23'; Griffith (yellow card) 46'; Kelly 75'; Prince 85'	Report	Phoenix (yellow card) 75'	Stadium: Blackbaud Stadium; Attendance: 4,546; Referee: Howard Ash

3 May 2013 4	VSI Tampa Bay FC	3–1	Antigua Barracuda FC	Plant City, FL, United States
21:00 ADT	Donatelli 52'; Salles 75', 91+'	Report	Thomas 8'; Philip (red card) 92+'	Stadium: Plant City Stadium; Attendance: 256; Referee: Donald Thompson

=== CFU Club Championship ===
==== Group table ====
Team	Pld	W	D	L	GF	GA	GD	Pts
(Trinidad and Tobago) W Connection	2	1	1	0	4	0	+4	4
(Trinidad and Tobago) Caledonia AIA	2	1	0	1	3	5	−2	3
(Antigua and Barbuda) Antigua Barracuda	2	0	1	1	1	3	−2	1

==== First round ====
28 April 2013 1	Caledonia AIA (Trinidad and Tobago)	3–1	(Antigua and Barbuda) Antigua Barracuda FC	Couva, Trinidad and Tobago
17:00 ADT	Gay 21'; Theobald 34'; Edwards 90'	Report	Manders 88'	Stadium: Ato Boldon Stadium; Attendance: 40; Referee: Kimbett Ward

30 April 2013 2	W Connection (Trinidad and Tobago)	0–0	(Antigua and Barbuda) Antigua Barracuda FC	Couva, Trinidad and Tobago
18:00 ADT		Report		Stadium: Ato Boldon Stadium; Attendance: 86; Referee: Johannes Dolaini

== Statistics ==
Note: Flags indicate national team as defined under FIFA eligibility rules; some limited exceptions apply. Players may hold more than one non-FIFA nationality. Squad correct as of July 6, 2013.

No.	Pos.	Nation	Player
1	GK	USA	Corey Whisenhunt
2	MF	JAM	Toric Robinson
4	DF	ATG	Karanja Mack
6	DF	ATG	Jamoy Stevens
7	MF	ATG	Eugene Kirwan
8	FW	ATG	Alex Phillip
9	DF	ATG	Mervyn Hazlewood
10	FW	ATG	Rolston Phoenix
12	MF	SKN	Orlando Mitchum
13	MF	ATG	Tamorley Thomas
14	MF	ATG	Randolph Burton
15	MF	ATG	Lawson Robinson
17	DF	ATG	George Dublin
18	GK	ATG	Molvin James
19	FW	ATG	Lloyd Jeremy
22	DF	ATG	Hazeley Pyle
24	DF	ATG	Omarie Daniel
27	MF	HAI	James Marcelin
29	MF	BER	Andre Manders
