= Gayson Gregory =

Antiguan footballer

Personal information
- Date of birth: 5 April 1982 (age 44)
- Place of birth: Bolands, Saint Mary
- Height: 5 ft 7 in (1.70 m)
- Position: Striker

Team information
- Current team: Swetes FC

Senior career*
Years	Team	Apps	(Gls)
2001–2002	Joe Public		
2003–2005	Hoppers FC		
2005–2006	Freemansville FC		
2006	Joe Public		
2006–2007	Hoppers FC		
2007–2008	Freemansville FC		
2008	San Juan Jabloteh		
2008	Montreal Impact	6	(0)
2009	Freemansville FC		
2009–2010	Old Road FC		
2010–2011	Joe Public		
2011	Antigua Barracuda	12	(1)
2014–2017	Parham FC		
2017–	Swetes FC		

International career^{‡}
2000–2014	Antigua and Barbuda	49	(8)
- * Club domestic league appearances and goals as of 22 November 2024 ‡ National team caps and goals as of 22 November 2024

Gayson Gregory (born 5 April 1982) is an Antiguan footballer.

== Club career ==
Born in Bolands, Gregory was named Most Valuable Player of the 1999 season at the Antigua Football Association's Hall of Fame induction. He joined Trinidadian side Joe Public F.C. in March 2001 to embark a career in professional football, whilst completing his secondary education. Gregory denied rumours linking him with a move to Hoppers FC in August 2003, but a month later did move to Hoppers. It was revealed in 2005 that Gregory was registered with two teams, Freemansville and Wadadli FC, and that Freemansville had made a request for him to be released from his contract with Wadadli.

Gregory scored 13 goals in the Antigua and Barbuda Premier Division in the 2006–07 season. He went for trials with AFC Bournemouth and Nottingham Forest following the closure of the 2006–07 season, and also went on trial with York City after he and Damien Farrell had been recommended by Bryan Hamilton, a consultant for the Antiguan national team. He and Farrell were however sent back to their homeland, but York manager Billy McEwan said he and Farrell could still be brought back on trial throughout the season.

It was reported that Gregory was to return to England within a few weeks after returning home. He was to return to York City for additional trials before the end of August, but went to play for San Juan Jabloteh for the remainder of their season. He scored four goals in the Pro League for San Juan, but scored eight goals overall. He joined Montreal Impact in the USL First Division in August 2008, but left in January 2009 to rejoin Freemansville.

== International career ==
Nicknamed Bubbler, Gregory earned his first cap for Antigua and Barbuda in 2000. He was joint seventh top scorer of the 2007 CONCACAF Gold Cup Qualifying with two goals. He has participated in nine FIFA World Cup qualification games, and was part of the Antigua squad which took part in the final stages of the 2010 Caribbean Championship.

=== National team statistics ===
As of 27 May 2011.

Antigua and Barbuda national team
Year	Apps	Goals
2000	6	2
2003	3	0
2004	1	0
2006	6	2
2008	11	1
2009	1	1
2010	7	2
2011	1	0
Total	36	8

Scores and results list Antigua and Barbuda's goal tally first.

No.	Date	Venue	Opponent	Score	Result	Competition
1.	7 May 2000	Antigua Recreation Ground, St John's, Antigua and Barbuda	Saint Vincent and the Grenadines	1-0	2–1	2002 FIFA World Cup qualification
2.	7 May 2000	Antigua Recreation Ground, St John's, Antigua and Barbuda	Saint Vincent and the Grenadines	2-1	2–1	2002 FIFA World Cup qualification
3.	24 September 2006	Antigua Recreation Ground, St John's, Antigua and Barbuda	Saint Kitts and Nevis	1-0	1–0	2007 Caribbean Cup qualification
4.	28 November 2006	Georgetown Cricket Club Ground, Georgetown, Guyana	Guadeloupe	1-2	1–3	2007 Caribbean Cup qualification
5.	8 June 2008	Sir Vivian Richards Stadium, Saint George, Antigua and Barbuda	Saint Kitts and Nevis	2-0	2–0	Friendly
6.	28 June 2009	National Cricket Stadium, St George's, Grenada	Grenada	1-1	2–2	Friendly
7.	27 November 2010	Stade En Camée, Rivière-Pilote, Martinique	Jamaica	1-3	1–3	2010 Caribbean Cup
8.	29 November 2010	Stade En Camée, Rivière-Pilote, Martinique	Guyana	1-0	1–1	2010 Caribbean Cup
