= Lawson Robinson =

Antiguan footballer (born 1986)

Personal information
- Full name: Lawson Robinson
- Date of birth: October 19, 1986 (age 40)
- Place of birth: Antigua and Barbuda
- Position: Midfielder

Team information
- Current team: Antigua Barracuda FC
- Number: 23

Senior career*
Years	Team	Apps	(Gls)
2004–2006	Hoppers		
2007–2008	Empire		
2008–2009	Hoppers		
2009–2011	All Saints United		
2011–2013	Antigua Barracuda FC	37	(1)

International career^{‡}
2010–	Antigua and Barbuda	19	(1)
- * Club domestic league appearances and goals as of August 20, 2012 ‡ National team caps and goals as of October 19, 2012

Lawson Robinson (born October 19, 1986) is an Antiguan footballer who currently plays for Antigua Barracuda FC in the USL Professional Division and the Antigua and Barbuda national team.

== Club career ==
Robinson began his professional career in 2004 with Hoppers in the Antigua and Barbuda Premier Division, and helped the team win the CTV Warriors' Cup in 2005. He went on to play for Empire and All Saints United.

In 2011 Robinson transferred to the new Antigua Barracuda FC team prior to its first season in the USL Professional Division. He made his debut for the Barracudas in their first competitive game on April 17, 2011, a 2–1 loss to the Los Angeles Blues.

== International career ==
Robinson made his debut for the Antigua and Barbuda national team in 2010, and has since gone on to make four appearances for his country. He was part of the Antigua squad which took part in the final stages of the 2010 Caribbean Championship.

=== National team statistics ===
Antigua and Barbuda national team
Year	Apps	Goals
2010	3	0
2011	7	0
2012	9	1
Total	19	1

=== International goals ===
Scores and results list Antigua and Barbuda' goal tally first.

N.	Date	Venue	Opponent	Score	Result	Competition
1.	April 1, 2012	Arnos Vale Stadium, Kingstown, Saint Vincent and the Grenadines	Saint Vincent and the Grenadines	1–0	2–1	Friendly
