= Keita de Castro =

Antigua and Barbudan footballer

Personal information
- Full name: Keita de Castro
- Date of birth: May 23, 1981 (age 45)
- Place of birth: Antigua and Barbuda
- Position: Goalkeeper

Senior career*
Years	Team	Apps	(Gls)
2003–2004	Empire FC		
2008–2011	All Saints United		
2011–2012	Antigua Barracuda FC	28	(0)

International career^{‡}
2008–	Antigua and Barbuda	13	(0)
- * Club domestic league appearances and goals as of August 20, 2012 ‡ National team caps and goals as of August 20, 2012

Keita de Castro (born May 23, 1981) is an Antiguan and Barbudan footballer who played for Antigua Barracuda FC in the USL Professional Division.

== Club career ==
de Castro began his career in 2003 with Empire FC, helping his club finish fourth in the Antigua and Barbuda Premier Division, but he only lasted one season with the team. After being without a club for five years, de Castro signed with All Saints United in 2008, and spent three seasons there.

In 2011 de Castro transferred to the new Antigua Barracuda FC team prior to its first season in the USL Professional Division. He made his debut for the Barracudas on April 27, 2011, in a 7–0 victory over Puerto Rico United.

== International career ==
de Castro made his debut for the Antigua and Barbuda national team in 2008, and has since gone on to make nine appearances for his country. He was part of the Antigua squad which took part in the final stages of the 2010 Caribbean Championship.
