= Derrick Edwards =

Antigua and Barbudan footballer and manager

Personal information
- Full name: Derrick Edwards
- Date of birth: 24 May 1968 (age 58)
- Place of birth: Antigua and Barbuda
- Position: Forward

Team information
- Current team: Grenades F.C. (Manager)

Senior career*
Years	Team	Apps	(Gls)
2000–2005	SAP F.C.		

International career
1988–2003	Antigua and Barbuda	20	(18)

Managerial career
- SAP F.C.
- 2005–2008: Antigua and Barbuda
- 2009–2012: Old Road F.C.
- 2016–: Grenades F.C.
- * Club domestic league appearances and goals

Derrick Edwards (born 24 May 1968), is an Antiguan and Barbudan former footballer and manager of the Antigua and Barbuda national team. He is currently the head coach of Grenades F.C.

== International career ==
Nicknamed "Pretty Boy", Edwards made his debut for Antigua and Barbuda in 1988 and was member of the national team for 12 years. He played in 10 FIFA World Cup qualification games.

After retiring as a player, he became coach of SAP F.C. and then national team coach in 2006.

== International goals ==
Scores and results list Antigua's goal tally first, score column indicates score after each Antigua goal.

No.	Date	Venue	Opponent	Score	Result	Competition	Ref.
1	29 July 1988	Willemstad, Netherlands Antilles	Netherlands Antilles	1–0	1–3	1989 CONCACAF Championship qualification	
2	26 April 1992	Antigua Recreation Ground, St. John's, Antigua and Barbuda	Netherlands Antilles	1–0	3–0	1994 FIFA World Cup qualification	
3	26 April 1992	Antigua Recreation Ground, St. John's, Antigua and Barbuda	Netherlands Antilles	2–0	3–0	1994 FIFA World Cup qualification	
4	26 April 1992	Antigua Recreation Ground, St. John's, Antigua and Barbuda	Netherlands Antilles	3–0	3–0	1994 FIFA World Cup qualification	
5	4 April 1993	Ronald Webster Park, The Valley, Anguilla	Anguilla	1–0	4–0	1993 Caribbean Cup qualification	
6	4 April 1993	Ronald Webster Park, The Valley, Anguilla	Anguilla	4–0	4–0	1993 Caribbean Cup qualification	
7	21 May 1995	Antigua Recreation Ground, St. John's, Antigua and Barbuda	Saint Kitts and Nevis		2–2	1995 Caribbean Cup qualification	
8	25 July 1995	Grand Cayman, Cayman Islands	French Guiana		2–1	1995 Caribbean Cup	
9	10 March 1996	Windsor Park, Roseau, Dominica	Dominica	2–1	3–3	1998 FIFA World Cup qualification	
10	10 March 1996	Windsor Park, Roseau, Dominica	Dominica	3–2	3–3	1998 FIFA World Cup qualification	
11	31 March 1996	Antigua Recreation Ground, St. John's, Antigua and Barbuda	Dominica	1–1	1–3	1998 FIFA World Cup qualification	
12	6 July 1997	Antigua Recreation Ground, St. John's, Antigua and Barbuda	Grenada		1–3	1997 Caribbean Cup	
13	15 April 1998	Antigua Recreation Ground, St. John's, Antigua and Barbuda	Guyana	1–0	1–3	1998 Caribbean Cup qualification	
14	15 April 1998	Antigua Recreation Ground, St. John's, Antigua and Barbuda	Guyana	2–1	1–3	1998 Caribbean Cup qualification	
15	22 July 1998	Hasely Crawford Stadium, Port of Spain, Trinidad and Tobago	Trinidad and Tobago	1–2	2–3	1998 Caribbean Cup	
16	24 July 1998	Hasely Crawford Stadium, Port of Spain, Trinidad and Tobago	Dominica	1–0	2–1	1998 Caribbean Cup	
17	26 July 1998	Hasely Crawford Stadium, Port of Spain, Trinidad and Tobago	Martinique	2–1	5–1	1998 Caribbean Cup	
18	23 April 2000	Bermuda National Stadium, Hamilton, Bermuda	Bermuda	1–1	1–1	2002 FIFA World Cup qualification	
