= Stefan Smith =

Antigua and Barbudan footballer

Personal information
- Full name: Stefan Smith
- Date of birth: August 11, 1989 (age 37)
- Place of birth: Antigua and Barbuda
- Position: Forward

Team information
- Current team: Empire

Senior career*
Years	Team	Apps	(Gls)
2008–2019	Old Road FC		(90)
2011–2012	Antigua Barracuda FC	35	(9)
2013	Charlotte Eagles	22	(2)
2019-	Empire		

International career
- Antigua and Barbuda U17
- Antigua and Barbuda U20
2011	Antigua and Barbuda U23	3	(2)
2011–2018	Antigua and Barbuda	14	(2)
- * Club domestic league appearances and goals as of 1 May 2024

Stefan Smith (born August 11, 1989) is an Antiguan footballer who currently plays for Charlotte Eagles in the USL Professional Division.

== Club career ==
Smith began his career in 2008 playing for Old Road FC in the Antigua and Barbuda Premier Division. He was the top scorer in the league in his debut season in 2008/09, scoring 17 goals, and helped the team finish as runners-up to Bassa in 2009/10.

In 2011 Smith transferred to the new Antigua Barracuda FC team prior to its first season in the USL Professional Division. He made his debut for the Barracudas on April 17, 2011, in the team's first ever competitive game, a 2–1 loss to the Los Angeles Blues.

=== International goals ===
Scores and results list Antigua and Barbuda's goal tally first.

Goal	Date	Venue	Opponent	Score	Result	Competition
1.	18 May 2008	Antigua Recreation Ground, St. John's, Antigua and Barbuda	Saint Lucia	?	6–1	Friendly
2.	8 October 2016	Antigua Recreation Ground, St. John's, Antigua and Barbuda	Trinidad and Tobago	2–0	2–0	2017 Caribbean Cup qualification
