= Tash Harris =

Antigua and Barbudan footballer

Personal information
- Full name: Tash Harris
- Date of birth: October 28, 1983 (age 43)
- Place of birth: Antigua and Barbuda
- Position: Defender

Team information
- Current team: Antigua Barracuda FC
- Number: 8

Senior career*
Years	Team	Apps	(Gls)
2005–2010	Old Road FC		
2011–	Antigua Barracuda FC	3	(0)

International career^{‡}
2008	Antigua and Barbuda	1	(0)
- * Club domestic league appearances and goals as of September 16, 2011 ‡ National team caps and goals as of May 31, 2011

Tash Harris (born October 28, 1983) is an Antiguan footballer who currently plays for Antigua Barracuda FC in the USL Professional Division.

== Club career ==
Harris began his career with Old Road FC, and played 6 seasons for them in the Antigua and Barbuda Premier Division between 2006 and 2010, before joining Antigua Barracuda FC in 2011. He made his debut for Barracuda on April 17, 2011, in the team's first competitive game, a 2–1 loss to the Los Angeles Blues.

== International career ==
Harris has been capped once for the Antigua and Barbuda national team in 2008.
