= Football in Antigua and Barbuda =

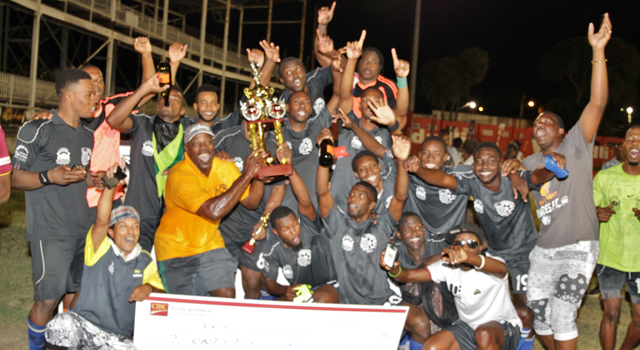
- 2016 ABFA champions
- Country: Antigua and Barbuda
- National team: Men's national team

National competitions
- Premier League

International competitions
- CONCACAF Champions League; CONCACAF League; FIFA Club World Cup; CONCACAF Gold Cup (National Team); CONCACAF Nations League (National Team); FIFA World Cup (National Team); CONCACAF Women's Championship (National Team); FIFA Women's World Cup (National Team)

Football in Antigua and Barbuda is one of the Caribbean country's most popular sports. It is second only to cricket.

- National Football Team

== League system ==
Level	League(s)/Division(s)
1	Premier League; 10 clubs
	↓↑ 2-3 clubs
2	Antigua and Barbuda First Division; 12 clubs
	↓↑ 2-3 clubs
3	Antigua and Barbuda Second Division 22 clubs in 2 groups

== Stadiums in Antigua and Barbuda ==
Stadium	Country	Capacity
Sir Vivian Richards Stadium	Antigua and Barbuda	10,000

== Attendances ==
The football club from Antigua and Barbuda with the highest average home league attendance per league season:

Club	Season	Games	Total	Average
Antigua Barracuda	2011	12	18,911	1,576

Source: League page on Wikipedia
