= Gravy (disambiguation) =

Gravy is a type of sauce, usually made from the juices that naturally run from meat or vegetables during cooking.

Gravy may also refer to:

- Gravy (entertainer), adopted name of dancer Labon Kenneth Blackburn Leeweltine Buckonon Benjamin
- Gravy (film), a 2015 horror comedy film
- Gravy, a magazine and podcast created by the Southern Foodways Alliance
- "Gravy (On My Mashed Potatoes)", a 1962 song by Dee Dee Sharp
- Gravy, 1968 song by The Monkees, from their album, Head
- Dave Felton, musician
- Jamal Woolard, rapper and star of the Notorious B.I.G. biopic
- Tomato gravy, an Italian-American tomato sauce

== See also ==
- Lumpy Gravy, a 1968 album by Frank Zappa
- Wavy Gravy, a peace activist and hippie clown associated with The Grateful Dead
- Yung Gravy, a rapper
