= GCFC =

The initials GCFC may refer to the following:

- Gilford Crusaders F.C.
- Global Cebu F.C.
- Gloucester City F.C.
- Green City F.C.
- Guildford City F.C.
- The Gold Coast Suns
- Gold Coast United Football Club
- Generalized context-free grammar or GCFC
- Get Coffee From Cafe

See also: Guildford (city) and Gold Coast, Queensland
