= Kimoi Alexander =

Antiguan footballer

Personal information
- Full name: Kimoi Alexander
- Date of birth: November 13, 1985 (age 40)
- Place of birth: Antigua and Barbuda
- Position: Midfielder

Team information
- Current team: Swetes FC
- Number: 10

Senior career*
Years	Team	Apps	(Gls)
2011–2013	Antigua Barracuda FC	29	(0)
2013	All Saints United	?	(?)
2013-	Swetes FC	?	(?)

International career^{‡}
2008–	Antigua and Barbuda	9	(1)
- * Club domestic league appearances and goals as of August 20, 2012 ‡ National team caps and goals as of August 20, 2012

Kimoi Alexander (born November 13, 1985) is an Antiguan footballer who currently plays for Swetes FC in the USL Professional Division.

== Career ==
Alexander made his professional debut for Barracuda on May 8, 2011, in a 1–0 win against River Plate Puerto Rico.

== International ==
Alexander so far has made nine appearances for the Antigua and Barbuda national team and scored one goal.

=== International goals ===
Scores and results list Antigua and Barbuda's goal tally first.

Goal	Date	Venue	Opponent	Score	Result	Competition
1.	2 September 2011	Grenada National Stadium, St. George's, Grenada	Grenada	2–2	2–2	Friendly
