= Luciano Cigno =

Argentinean footballer (born 1988)

Personal information
- Full name: Luciano Leonel Cigno
- Date of birth: February 29, 1988 (age 38)
- Place of birth: Buenos Aires, Argentina
- Position: Midfielder

Senior career*
Years	Team	Apps	(Gls)
-2012	Club Atlético Vélez Sarsfield	2	(0)
2011	AC Bellinzona→(loan)	0	(0)
2012-2013	Club Almagro→(loan)	20	(2)
2014-2015	Sportivo Dock Sud	44	(12)
2015-2016	Maccabi Ahi Nazareth F.C.	31	(9)
2016-2017	Club Atlético Ciclón		
2017-2018	Sacachispas Fútbol Club	2	(0)
2018-2019	Club El Porvenir	11	(1)
2019	Old Road F.C.		
2020	Empire Club		
- * Club domestic league appearances and goals

Luciano Cigno (born 29 February 1988) is an Argentinean footballer who last played for Empire Club in Barbados.

== Career ==
Cigno started his senior career with Club Atlético Vélez Sarsfield. In 2012, he signed for Club Almagro in the Argentinean Primera B Metropolitana, where he made twenty-one appearances and scored two goals. After that, he played for Sportivo Dock Sud, Maccabi Ahi Nazareth, Club Atlético Ciclón, Sacachispas Fútbol Club, Old Road, and Empire Club.
