= Conrad Whyte =

Antiguan footballer

Conrad Whyte is an Antigua and Barbuda former footballer who last played as a striker for Empire.

== Early life ==
Whyte started playing football at the age of ten. He is nicknamed "Boast".

== Youth career ==
Whyte played in the Shipwreck Youth Football League, which was described as "responsible for the development of a number of players coming out of the Gray’s Green community and other communities across the island".

== Education ==
Whyte obtained a A License.

== Playing career ==
Whyte started his career with Antigua and Barbuda side Empire, where he was described as "won several scoring titles with a successful Empire football team".

== Style of play ==
Whyte mainly operated as a striker and was described as "known to be clinical in front of goal".

== Post-playing career ==
Whyte has owned the Carisamba Soccer Academy.

== Managerial career ==
After retiring from playing football, Whyte worked as assistant manager.

== Personal life ==
Whyte is the father of Antigua and Barbuda footballer Jair Whyte.
