= Karanja Mack =

Antigua and Barbudan footballer

Personal information
- Date of birth: 24 August 1987 (age 39)
- Place of birth: Antigua and Barbuda
- Height: 1.73 m (5 ft 8 in)
- Position: Defender

Team information
- Current team: Antigua Barracuda FC
- Number: 4

Senior career*
Years	Team	Apps	(Gls)
2006–2010	SAP FC		
2011–2013	Antigua Barracuda FC	39	(0)

International career^{‡}
- Antigua and Barbuda U20
2006–	Antigua and Barbuda	56	(0)
- * Club domestic league appearances and goals as of 20 August 2012 ‡ National team caps and goals as of 14:50, 7 March 2017 (UTC)

Karanja Mack (born 24 August 1987) is an Antiguan footballer currently playing for Antigua Barracuda FC in the USL Professional Division.

== Club career ==
Mack played with SAP FC in the Antigua and Barbuda Premier Division from 2006 to 2010, winning the league championship in 2005-06 and 2008–09, and the Antigua and Barbuda FA Cup in 2009, and played for SAP in the group stages of the CFU Club Championship in 2006–07. Mack also had a trial with Trinidadian professional outfit Tobago United in 2008, but did not sign with the team.

In 2011 Mack transferred to the new Antigua Barracuda FC team prior to its first season in the USL Professional Division. He made his debut for the Barracudas in their first competitive game on April 17, 2011, a 2–1 loss to the Los Angeles Blues.

== International career ==
Mack made his debut for Antigua and Barbuda in a November 2006 CONCACAF Gold Cup qualification match against the Dominican Republic and has earned nearly 10 caps since. He played in 2 World Cup qualification games, and was part of the Antigua squad which took part in the final stages of the 2010 Caribbean Championship.
