= Tevaughn Harriette =

Antigua and Barbuda footballer (born 1995)

Personal information
- Date of birth: 26 June 1995 (age 31)
- Place of birth: Antigua and Barbuda
- Position: Striker

Team information
- Current team: Parham FC

Senior career*
Years	Team	Apps	(Gls)
2014–	Parham FC		

International career^{‡}
- Antigua and Barbuda U17
- Antigua and Barbuda U20
2014–	Antigua and Barbuda	23	(6)
- * Club domestic league appearances and goals ‡ National team caps and goals as of 30 October 2020

Tevaughn Harriette (born 26 June 1995) is an Antigua and Barbuda international footballer who plays as a striker.

He was the United Progressive Party candidate in St Peter in the 2023 Antiguan general election.

== International career ==
Harriette has been capped at under-17 and under-20 level. He made his senior international debut for Antigua and Barbuda with a goal on 3 September 2014 in a match against Anguilla in the Caribbean Cup.

=== International goals ===
As of match played 9 September 2019. Antigua and Barbuda score listed first, score column indicates score after each Harriette goal.

International goals by date, venue, cap, opponent, score, result and competition
No.	Date	Venue	Cap	Opponent	Score	Result	Competition
1	3 September 2014	Antigua Recreation Ground, St. John's, Antigua and Barbuda	1	Anguilla	3–0	6–0	2014 Caribbean Cup qualification
2	10 June 2015	Sir Vivian Richards Stadium, North Sound, Antigua and Barbuda	9	Saint Lucia	1–0	1–3	2018 FIFA World Cup qualification
3	14 June 2015	Sir Vivian Richards Stadium, North Sound, Antigua and Barbuda	10	Saint Lucia	2–1	4–1	2018 FIFA World Cup qualification
4	4 November 2015	Arnos Vale Stadium, Kingstown, Saint Vincent and the Grenadines	13	Saint Vincent and the Grenadines	1–0	1–2	Friendly
5	7 June 2016	Sir Vivian Richards Stadium, North Sound, Antigua and Barbuda	15	Grenada	4–1	5–1	2017 Caribbean Cup qualification
6	9 September 2019	Sir Vivian Richards Stadium, North Sound, Antigua and Barbuda	20	Aruba	4–1	5–1	2019–20 CONCACAF Nations League B
