= F.C. Aston Villa (Antigua and Barbuda) =

- Full name: Football Club Aston Villa
- Nickname: The Lions
- Founded: 1968
- Ground: Antigua Recreation Ground; St John's, Antigua and Barbuda
- Capacity: 9,000
- League: Antigua and Barbuda Premier Division
- 2025–26: 3rd

Football Club Aston Villa or Villa Lions is an Antiguan professional football club playing in the Antigua and Barbuda Premier Division. It is based in St. John's.

== History ==
The club was founded in 1968 and was founded as the Villa Lions. The club's name was named after England's Aston Villa.

The club has won the Premier Division twice, in 1984 and a second time in 1986.

== Achievements ==
- Antigua and Barbuda Premier Division: 2

1983–84, 1985–86
