= Tyio Simon =

Antigua and Barbudan footballer

Personal information
- Full name: Tyio Simon
- Date of birth: 29 September 1978 (age 48)
- Place of birth: Antigua and Barbuda
- Position: Midfielder

Team information
- Current team: SAP

Senior career*
Years	Team	Apps	(Gls)
2003–	SAP		

International career^{‡}
2003–2008	Antigua and Barbuda	12	(2)
- * Club domestic league appearances and goals as of 21:24, 2 June 2008 (UTC) ‡ National team caps and goals as of 31 December 2008

Tyio Simon (born 29 September 1978) is an Antiguan and Barbudan footballer, currently playing for SAP in the Antigua and Barbuda Premier Division.

== International career ==
Simon, not be confused with fellow Antiguan midfielder Troy Simon, made his debut for Antigua and Barbuda in a March 2003 CONCACAF Gold Cup qualification match against Cuba and has earned over 10 caps since. He played in 4 FIFA World Cup qualification games.

== National team statistics ==
Antigua and Barbuda national team
Year	Apps	Goals
2003	2	0
2004	1	0
2005	0	0
2006	6	0
2007	0	0
2008	3	1
Total	12	1

=== International goals ===
Scores and results list Antigua and Barbuda's goal tally first.

Goal	Date	Venue	Opponent	Score	Result	Competition
1.	3 November 2006	Arnos Vale Stadium, Kingstown, Saint Vincent and the Grenadines	Grenada	?	1–1	Friendly
2.	17 June 2008	Sir Vivian Richards Stadium, North Sound, Antigua and Barbuda	Cuba	3–3	3–4	2010 FIFA World Cup qualification
