= John Hughes SC =

- Full name: John Hughes Sports Club
- Founded: 1999; 26 years ago
- Ground: John Hughes Ground
- League: Antigua and Barbuda Premier Division
- 2024–25: 7th
- Website: https://www.facebook.com/JHSC268/

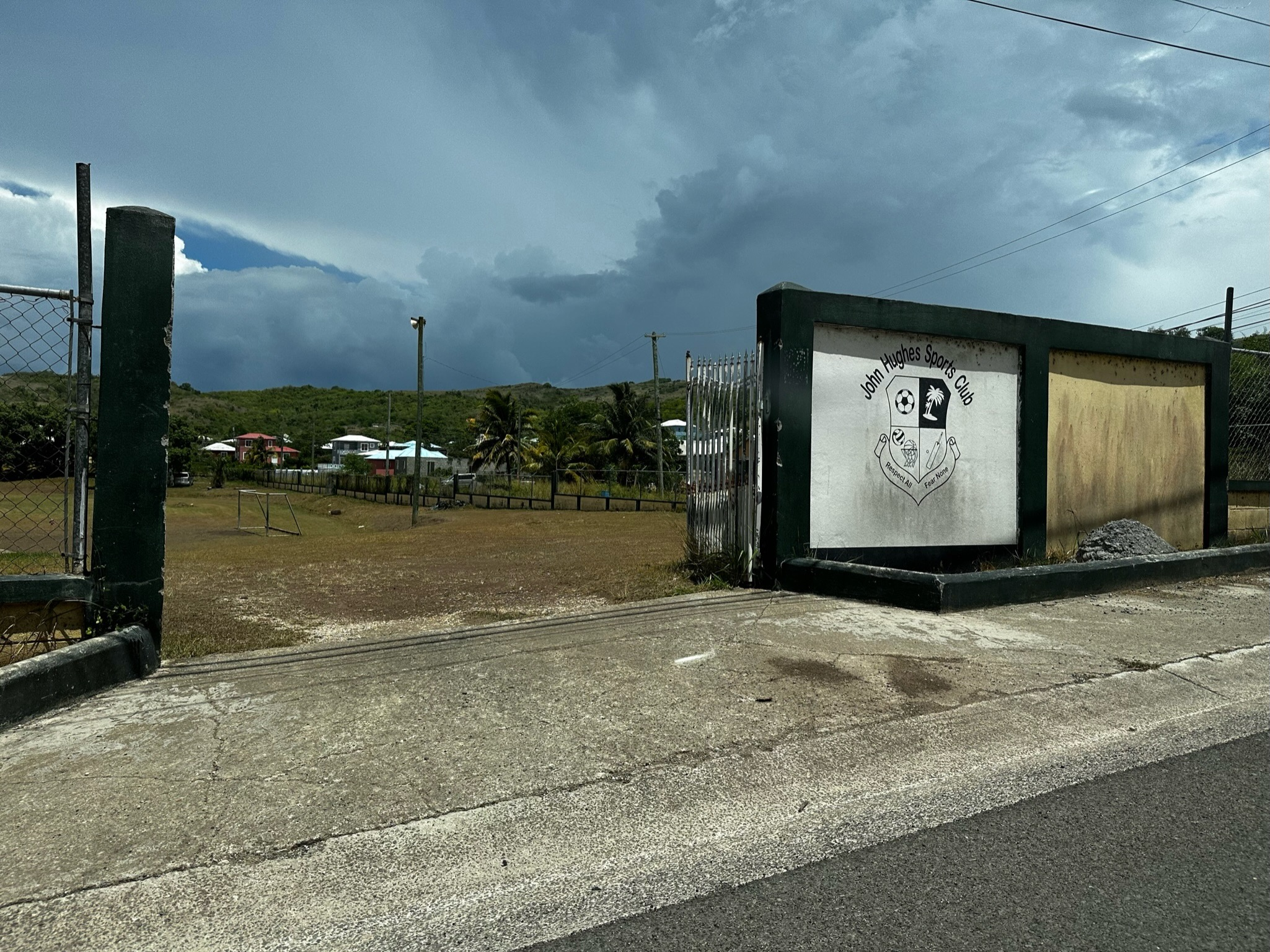
John Hughes SC playing field in June 2023

John Hughes SC is an Antiguan association football club from the town of John Hughes that currently plays in the Premier Division. The club also fields a cricket team in the island's cricket league.

== History ==
The club was founded in 1999. In 2018 the club competed in the First Division, the second tier of football in the country. In May 2023, the club defeated Cedar Grove Blue Jays FC in the promotion/relegation play-off to earn promotion to the Premier Division the following season.
