= Rowan Benjamin =

Antigua and Barbuda football manager

Personal information
- Place of birth: Antigua and Barbuda

Team information
- Current team: Liberta F.C. (technical director)

Managerial career
- Years: Team
- 2008–2011: Antigua and Barbuda
- 201x–2013: All Saints United F.C.

Rowan "Porridge" Benjamin is an Antiguan and Barbudan manager of the Antigua and Barbuda national team. He is currently the technical director of the All Saints United Football Club, the 2013-2014 champions of the Premier Division in Antigua.

== Career ==
Since 2008 until 2011 he coached national team.
