= Steveroy Anthony =

Antigua and Barbudan footballer (born 1971)

Personal information
- Date of birth: 7 July 1971 (age 55)
- Place of birth: Antigua and Barbuda
- Position: Defender

Team information
- Current team: Hoppers FC Green Bay

International career
Years	Team	Apps	(Gls)
2000–2004	Antigua and Barbuda	11	(0)

Steveroy "Deman" Anthony (born 7 July 1971) is an Antigua and Barbudan football player. He has played for Antigua and Barbuda national team. He was the head coach of the Empire Football Club in the St. John's neighborhood, as well as a founder of the Football Past Players Support Foundation.

== National team statistics ==
Antigua and Barbuda national team
Year	Apps	Goals
2000	4	0
2001	0	0
2002	2	0
2003	3	0
2004	2	0
Total	11	0
