= Gravy (entertainer) =

Antiguan entertainer

Gravy (born Labon Kenneth Blackburn Leeweltine Buckonon Benjamin; in 1955), is a former entertainer, famous throughout the cricket world, for 12 years of voluntary entertaining of the crowd through a variety of antics at the Antigua Recreation Ground in St John's, Antigua.

== Performances ==
For 12 years from 1988, Gravy entertained the crowd with a variety of costumes and performances in (and sometimes above) the crowd at the stadium: "Gravy is a performer. He cross-dresses and dances and writhes and swings from the rafters and puts on a show that you will not ever forget."

His act began by chance: "It started to rain during the presentation ceremony, and the podium was left open. "Something told me, Gravy, this is your time. I went down on the podium, in the rain, and started dancing. Everybody was excited about it. They loved it."" He was unpaid for his activities. When he retired in 2000, he did so while wearing a white wedding dress. Since retirement, he runs a hardware stall in St John's.

== Shooting incident ==
In February 2004, Gravy was shot in the arm. He was driving home at 2 a.m. when, in his own words "a car overtook me and rang out four shots at me, and then I felt a burning on my arm". Gravy believes it was a case of mistaken identity, and has stated "I thought they took me for the wrong person. I don't know anybody who could point a finger at me".
