= Vera Cruz do Oeste =

Coordinates: 25.0578°S 53.8769°W

- Municipality
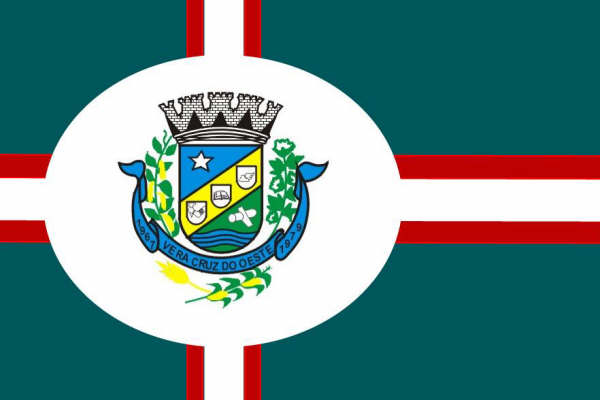
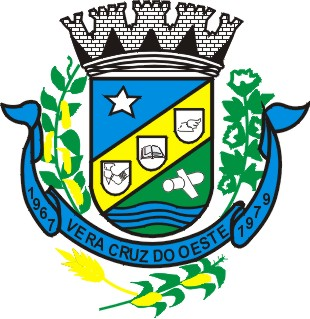
- Flag Coat of arms
- Interactive map of Vera Cruz do Oeste
- Country: Brazil
- Region: Southern
- State: Paraná
- Mesoregion: Oeste Paranaense

Population (2020)
  - Total: 8,454
- Time zone: UTC−3 (BRT)

Vera Cruz do Oeste is a municipality in the state of Paraná in the Southern Region of Brazil.

== See also ==
- List of municipalities in Paraná
