= Antigua and Barbuda Premier Division =

Association football league in Antigua and Barbuda

Premier Division
- Organising body: Antigua and Barbuda Football Association
- Founded: 1968
- Country: Antigua and Barbuda
- Confederation: CONCACAF
- Number of clubs: 12
- Level on pyramid: 1
- Relegation to: First Division
- Domestic cup: Antigua and Barbuda FA Cup
- International cup: CFU Club Shield
- Current champions: Grenades FC (2025–26)
- Most championships: Empire FC (13 titles)
- Top scorer: Conrad Whyte (158 goals)
- Website: www.antiguafootball.com
- Current: 2025–26 Antigua and Barbuda Premier Division

Antigua and Barbuda Premier Division, also known as ABFA Premier League, is an association football league and the highest level in Antigua and Barbuda. Founded in 1968, the league is contested by twelve participating clubs, and the last two placed clubs are relegated to the Antigua and Barbuda First Division.

== History ==
It was created in 1968 and is headed by the Antigua and Barbuda Football Association. As of the 2023–24 Season, 15 teams participate in this league, and as of 2025–26, 12 teams participate. The winner of the league qualifies for the following year's CFU Club Championship. The 9th and 10th placed teams are relegated to the Antigua and Barbuda First Division.

The championship is usually played between September and March.

From 28 January 2024, the league has found a steady growth of interest in parts of the United Kingdom.

== Participating clubs ==
Location of the Premier Division clubs in the 2025–26 season
- All Saints United FC
- Attacking Saints FC
- FC Aston Villa
- Garden Stars FC
- Green City FC
- Grenades FC
- Jennings United FC
- John Hughes SC
- Old Road FC
- Ottos Rangers FC
- Pigotts Bullets FC
- Potters Tigers FC

== Champions ==
Ed.	Season	Champions
1	1969	Empire
2	1970	Empire
3	1971	Empire
4	1972	Empire
5	1973	Empire
6	1974–75	Empire
7	1975–76	Supa Stars
8	1976–77	Supa Stars
9	1977–78	Five Islands
10	1978–79	Empire
11	1979–82	
12	1983	Lion Hill Spliff
13	1983–84	Villa Lions
14	1984–85	Liberta
15	1985–86	Villa Lions
16	1986–87	Liberta
17	1987–88	Empire
18	1988–89	SAP
19	1989–90	J&J Construction
20	1990–91	
21	1991–92	Empire
22	1992–93	
23	1993–94	Lion Hill Spliff
24	1994–95	English Harbour
25	1995–96	English Harbour
26	1996–97	English Harbour
27	1997–98	Empire
28	1998–99	Empire
29	1999–00	Empire
30	2000–01	Empire
31	2001–02	Parham
32	2002–03	Parham
33	2003–04	Bassa
34	2004–05	Bassa
35	2005–06	SAP
36	2006–07	Bassa
37	2007–08	Bassa
38	2008–09	SAP
39	2009–10	Bassa
40	2010–11	Parham
41	2011–12	Old Road
42	2012–13	Old Road
43	2013–14	SAP
44	2014–15	Parham
45	2015–16	Hoppers
46	2016–17	Parham
47	2017–18	Hoppers
48	2018–19	Liberta
49	2019–20	Unfinished season due to COVID-19 pandemic
–	2020–21	The league was canceled due to COVID-19 pandemic
50	2022–23	Grenades
51	2023–24	All Saints United
52	2024–25	All Saints United
53	2025–26	Grenades

== Performances ==
Rank	Club	Titles	Winning seasons
1	Empire FC	13	1969, 1970, 1971, 1972, 1973, 1974–75, 1978–79, 1987–88, 1991–92, 1997–98, 1998–99, 1999–00, 2000–01
2	Parham FC	6	1989–90, 2001–02, 2002–03, 2010–11, 2014–15, 2016–17
3	Bassa Sports Club	5	2003–04, 2004–05, 2006–07, 2007–08, 2009–10
4	SAP FC	4	1988–89, 2005–06, 2008–09, 2013–14
5	English Harbour	3	1994–95, 1995–96, 1996–97
6	Hoppers FC	2	2015–16, 2017–18
6	Liberta	2	1984–85, 1986–87
6	Lion Hill Spliff	2	1983, 1993–94
6	Old Road FC	2	2011–12, 2012–13
6	Supa Stars	2	1975–76, 1976–77
6	Villa Lions	2	1983–84, 1985–86
6	Grenades FC	2	2022–23, 2025–26
6	All Saints United FC	2	2023–24, 2024–25
14	Five Islands FC	1	1977–78
14	Liberta SC	1	2018–19

== Player records ==
=== Top goalscorers ===
Year	Topscorer(s)	Club(s)	Goals
2000–01	(Antigua and Barbuda) Conrad Whyte	Empire	21
2001–02	(Antigua and Barbuda) Conrad Whyte	Empire	26
2002–03	(Antigua and Barbuda) Rackley Thomas	SAP	20
2004–05	(Antigua and Barbuda) Peter Byers	SAP	18
2006–07	(Antigua and Barbuda) Ranjae Christian	Bassa	15
2008–09	(Antigua and Barbuda) Stefan Smith	Old Road	17
2009–10	(Antigua and Barbuda) Kelly Frederick	Hoppers	15
2012–13	(Antigua and Barbuda) Stefan Smith	Old Road	16
2013–14	(Antigua and Barbuda) Tevaughn Harriette	Parham	15
2016–17	(Antigua and Barbuda) Stefan Smith	Old Road	18
2017–18	(Cuba) Sánder Fernández	Five Islands	14
2019–20	(United States Virgin Islands) Rakeem Joseph	Empire	10
2022–23	(Antigua and Barbuda) Raheem Deterville	Old Road	22
2023–24	(Antigua and Barbuda) Raheem Deterville	Old Road	20
2024–25	(Antigua and Barbuda) Raheem Deterville	All Saints United	19
2025–26	(United States Virgin Islands) Rakeem Joseph	Old Road	36

- Most time goalscorers: 3 times each.
  - Stefan Smith (2008–09, 2012–13, 2016–17)
  - Raheem Deterville (2022–23, 2023–24, 2024–25)
- Most goals by a player in a single season: 36 goals
  - Rakeem Joseph (2025–26)
- Most goals by a player in a single game:
- 10 goals
  - Rakeem Joseph

=== All-time goalscorers ===
Rank	Player	Goals
1	(Antigua and Barbuda) Conrad Whyte	158
2	(Antigua and Barbuda) Peter Byers	141

=== Multiple hat-tricks ===
Rank	Country	Player	Hat-tricks
1	(Antigua and Barbuda)	Peter Byers	6
2	(Antigua and Barbuda)	Kelly Frederick	4
2	(Antigua and Barbuda)	Raheem Deterville	4
4	(Antigua and Barbuda)	Kerry Skepple	3
4	(Antigua and Barbuda)	Stefan Smith	3
4	(Saint Lucia)	Ridel Stanislas	3
4	(Antigua and Barbuda)	Tamorley Thomas	3
8	(United States Virgin Islands)	Rakeem Joseph	2
8	(Antigua and Barbuda)	Nazir McBurnette	2
8	(Antigua and Barbuda)	Tariq Prince	2
8	(Antigua and Barbuda)	Yoandir Puga	2
8	(Antigua and Barbuda)	Ahzino Solomon	2
8	(Antigua and Barbuda)	Malcolm Stewart	2
8	(Antigua and Barbuda)	Shaquan Telemarque	2
8	(Antigua and Barbuda)	Jamie Thomas	2
8	(Antigua and Barbuda)	Rackley Thomas	2
8	(Antigua and Barbuda)	Tyrique Tongue	2
8	(Cuba)	Yasnay Torres	2
19	(Antigua and Barbuda)	Bonnis Anthony	1
19	(Antigua and Barbuda)	Errie Barnes	1
19	(Antigua and Barbuda)	Clinton Benjamin	1
19	(Antigua and Barbuda)	Junior Benjamin	1
19	(Antigua and Barbuda)	Barrington Blake	1
19	(Antigua and Barbuda)	Emil Browne	1
19	(Antigua and Barbuda)	Theo Browne	1
19	(Antigua and Barbuda)	Randolph Burton	1
19	(Antigua and Barbuda)	Okeem Challenger	1
19	(Antigua and Barbuda)	Kenyatta Christian	1
19	(Antigua and Barbuda)	Ranjae Christian	1
19	(Antigua and Barbuda)	Derrick Edwards	1
19	(Antigua and Barbuda)	Eroy Gonsalves	1
19	(Antigua and Barbuda)	Gayson Gregory	1
19	(Dominica)	Ronnie Gustave	1
19	(Antigua and Barbuda)	Steven Harris	1
19	(Antigua and Barbuda)	Tash Harris	1
19	(Antigua and Barbuda)	Ashden Isaac	1
19	(Antigua and Barbuda)	Kai Jacobs	1
19	(Antigua and Barbuda)	Shafeeq Joseph	1
19	(Antigua and Barbuda)	Rodney Lawrence	1
19	(Antigua and Barbuda)	Tev Lawrence	1
19	(Jamaica)	Renae Lloyd	1
19	(Antigua and Barbuda)	Kenny Morgan	1
19	(Antigua and Barbuda)	Donovan Pert	1
19		Samoel Rodriques	1
19	(Antigua and Barbuda)	Sean Sam	1
19	(Antigua and Barbuda)	Tyio Simon	1
19	(Antigua and Barbuda)	Mitchley Wall	1
19	(Antigua and Barbuda)	Denzil Watson	1

- Most hat-tricks in a single season:
  - 25 hat-tricks (2022–23)
