= 2013–14 Antigua and Barbuda Premier Division =

Antigua and Barbuda Premier Division
- Season: 2013–14

Statistics of Antigua and Barbuda Premier Division during the 2013–14 season.

== League table ==
1.SAP               18  14  4  0  43–13  46  Champions
2.Parham            18  12  2  4  38–18  38
3.Hoppers           18  11  1  6  38–20  34
4.Jennings Grenades 18   8  3  7  34–23  27
5.Bassa             18   7  4  7  30–28  25
6.Fort Road        18   7  2  9  34–39  23
7.Old Road          18   5  7  6  25–23  22
-------------------------------------------
8.Willikies         18   5  2 11  17–31  17  Relegation Playoff
-------------------------------------------
9.All Saints United 18   4  5  9  17–40  17  Relegated
10.Potters Tigers   18   1  2 15  16–57   5  Relegated
