= Okeem Challenger =

Antiguan and Barbudan footballer

Personal information
- Full name: Okeem Challenger
- Date of birth: 22 August 1989 (age 37)
- Place of birth: Antigua and Barbuda
- Height: 1.78 m (5 ft 10 in)
- Position: Striker

Team information
- Current team: SAP

Senior career*
Years	Team	Apps	(Gls)
2004–	SAP		

International career
- Antigua and Barbuda U17
- Antigua and Barbuda U20
2008–2014	Antigua and Barbuda	6	(3)
- * Club domestic league appearances and goals as of 10:01, 24 May 2008 (UTC)

Okeem Challenger (born 22 August 1989) is an Antiguan and Barbudan footballer who plays for SAP in the Antigua and Barbuda Premier Division.

== International career ==
Nicknamed Soda, Challenger made his debut for Antigua and Barbuda in a March 2008 FIFA World Cup qualification match against Aruba, in which game he came on as a late substitute for Randolph Burton and immediately scored the winner. He has earned five caps since, but only played in one World Cup qualification game.

=== International goals ===
Scores and results list Antigua and Barbuda's goal tally first.

Goal	Date	Venue	Opponent	Score	Result	Competition
1.	26 March 2008	Antigua Recreation Ground, St. John's, Antigua and Barbuda	Aruba	1–0	1–0	2010 FIFA World Cup qualification
2.	27 August 2008	Truman Bodden Sports Complex, George Town, Cayman Islands	Bermuda	4–0	4–0	2008 Caribbean Cup qualification
3.	21 September 2008	Antigua Recreation Ground, St. John's, Antigua and Barbuda	Guyana	2–0	3–0	Friendly
