= Rackley Thomas =

Antigua and Barbudan footballer

Personal information
- Date of birth: 27 July 1980 (age 46)
- Place of birth: Antigua and Barbuda
- Position: Defender

International career
Years	Team	Apps	(Gls)
2002–2008	Antigua and Barbuda	5	(0)

Rackley Thomas is an Antigua and Barbudan football player. He has played for Antigua and Barbuda national team.

== National team statistics ==
Antigua and Barbuda national team
Year	Apps	Goals
2002	2	0
2003	2	0
2004	0	0
2005	0	0
2006	0	0
2007	0	0
2008	1	0
Total	5	0
