= Green City F.C. =

- Full name: Green City Football Club
- Short name: GCFC
- Founded: 2018
- Ground: Antigua State College Football Field; Bendals, Antigua and Barbuda
- Capacity: 200
- League: Antigua and Barbuda Premier Division
- 2025–26: 8th

Green City Football Club is an Antiguan professional football club playing in the Antigua and Barbuda Premier Division. It is based in Bendals.

== History ==
The club was founded in 2018. In 2023, the club earned promotion into the top division for the first time ever. The club has remained in the top division since then, although in 2026, it came close to being relegated, but won the relegation playoffs.
