= Sea View Farm F.C. =

Association football club in Antigua and Barbuda

Sea View Farm FC
- Full name: Sea View Farm Football Club
- Founded: 1965
- Ground: Antigua Recreation Ground; St John's, Antigua and Barbuda
- League: ?

The Sea View Farm FC is an Antigua and Barbuda Football Association team playing in the local second level – the First Division.

The club was founded in 1965, making it among the oldest in the country.
