= Antigua and Barbuda FA Cup =

Association football tournament in Antigua and Barbuda

- Organiser(s): Antigua and Barbuda Football Association
- Founded: 2004
- Region: Caribbean Football Union

The Antigua and Barbuda FA Cup is the top knockout tournament of the Antiguan football. The cup was created in 2004.

== Winners ==
- 2004/05 : SAP FC 2-1 Hoppers FC
- 2005/06 : Freemansville FC 1-1 Bassa (aet, 2-1 pens)
- 2006/07 : tournament cancelled on request of clubs due to long season
- 2007/08 : Bassa 0-0 Parham FC (aet, 5-4 pens)
- 2008/09 : SAP FC awd Hoppers FC
- 2009/10 : Bassa 1-1 Goldsmitty FC (aet, 4-1 pens)
- 2010/11 : Not played
- 2011/12 : Parham FC 4-0 Bassa
