= Grenades F.C. =

Association football club in Antigua and Barbuda

Grenades
- Full name: Grenades Football Club
- Founded: 1990; 36 years ago
- Ground: Antigua Recreation Ground; St John's, Antigua and Barbuda
- Capacity: 9,000
- Manager: Devonroy Wesley
- Coach: Tecquan Mullins
- League: Premier Division
- 2025–26: 1st
Home colours	Away colours

Grenades Football Club is an Antiguan professional football club established in 1990 and playing in the Antigua and Barbuda Premier Division. The club is based in St. John's, Antigua. Grenades joined the Premier Division in 2013–14, finishing fourth in their first season.

== Squad ==
2024 CFU Club Shield

Note: Flags indicate national team as defined under FIFA eligibility rules; some limited exceptions apply. Players may hold more than one non-FIFA nationality.

No.	Pos.	Nation	Player
—	GK	ATG	Zaheim Joseph
—	GK	ATG	Zaieem Scott
—	GK	ATG	Murphy Parker
—	DF	JAM	Keanu Barrett
—	DF	JAM	Blake Thompson
—	DF	ATG	Iteba Baltimore
—	DF	JAM	Kenneth Goulbourne
—	DF	CUB	Tony Sánchez
—	DF	CUB	Renay Malblanche
—	DF	ATG	Zaire Scott
—	DF	LCA	Kurt Frederick
—	MF	ATG	Teran Williams
—	MF	ATG	Kieron Richards
—	MF	LCA	Sherman Augustin
—	MF	ATG	Eugene Kirwan
—	MF	ATG	Carl Osbourne
—	MF	JAM	Barrington Blake

No.	Pos.	Nation	Player
—	MF	ATG	Quinton Griffith
—	MF	ATG	Stefan Smith
—	MF	LCA	Ridel Stanislas
—	MF	ATG	Daryl Massicot
—	MF	LCA	Lester Joseph
—	MF	ATG	D'Jarie Sheppard
—	MF	ATG	Sean Tomlinson
—	FW	CUB	Luis Ciudad
—	FW	TRI	Sean Cooper
—	FW	ATG	Rakeem Henry
—	FW	VIN	Akeem Williams
—	FW	LCA	Tev Lawrence
—	FW	VIN	Malcolm Stewart
—	FW	ATG	Maliko Anthony
—	FW	VIN	Kamol Griffith
