= Ottos Rangers FC =

- Founded: 1967; 59 years ago
- Manager: Daryl Michael
- League: Antigua and Barbuda Premier Division
- 2024/25: 1st, First Division (Promoted)
- Website: Website

Ottos Rangers FC is an Antiguan association football club that currently plays in the Premier Division.

== History ==
The club was founded in 1967. The club was champion of the 2024/25 First Division and earned promotion back to the Antigua and Barbuda Premier Division.
