= Antigua and Barbuda Football Association =

Governing body of association football in Antigua and Barbuda

CONCACAF
- Short name: abfa
- Founded: 1928
- Headquarters: St. John's
- FIFA affiliation: 1972
- CONCACAF affiliation: 1972
- President: Everton Gonsalves
- Website: http://antiguafootball.com/

The Antigua and Barbuda Football Association is the governing body of football in Antigua and Barbuda. They control the Antigua and Barbuda national football team.

== Association staff ==
Name	Position	Source
(Antigua and Barbuda) Everton Gonsalves	President	
(Antigua and Barbuda) Akheilla Hillhouse	Vice-president	
(Antigua and Barbuda) Daryl Michael	2nd Vice-president	
(Antigua and Barbuda) Gwen Solomon	3rd Vice-president	
(Antigua and Barbuda) Rohan Hector	General secretary	
(Antigua and Barbuda) Margaret Massiah	Treasurer	
(Antigua and Barbuda) Sowebry Gomes	Technical director	
(Mexico) Jacques Passy	Team coach (men's)	
(Antigua and Barbuda) Karen Warner	Team coach (women's)	
(Antigua and Barbuda) Troy Gibson	Media/communications manager	
(Antigua and Barbuda) Sean Samuel	Futsal Coordinator	
(Antigua and Barbuda) Rolston James	Chairperson of the Referees Committee	
(Antigua and Barbuda) Kelehsa Antoine	Head/Director of the Referees Department	
(Antigua and Barbuda) Kelehsa Antoine	Referee Coodinator	

== Competitions ==
The ABFA oversees the administration of Antigua and Barbuda's football leagues; the Premier Division, First Division, Second Division and the Female Division as well as the Antigua and Barbuda FA Cup.

== National Stadium ==
The ABFA's official national stadium is the Antigua Recreation Ground which have recently been approved to host World Cup 2010 qualifying matches. An attempt to have the Sir Vivian Richards Stadium approved for matches was rebuffed due to "ongoing works."
