= All Saints United F.C. =

Association football club in Antigua and Barbuda

All Saints United
- Full name: All Saints United Football Club
- Short name: ASUFC
- Founded: 1996
- Ground: New Jersey Antigua Playing Field
- Presidente: Hilroy Browne
- Head coach: Saverius Teach
- League: Premier Division
- 2025–26: 2nd
| Home colours | Away colours |

All Saints United F.C. is an Antiguan professional football club in the Antigua and Barbuda Premier Division. The All Saints United Football Club was founded in 1996 where two community teams, Westdnd Pressers and Attackers, came together. The team's motto is "When conviction runs, deep courage rises to sustain it".

In 2005/06 the team won the First Division League and was promoted to the Premier Division. The team entered the league under the leadership of Alphanse Danials and retired coach Eliston Thomas. In the 2013/14 season, Danny and Rowan Benjamin resigned and Tracey Allen became the head coach. After two failed promotion attempts, All Saints United signed Schyan Jeffers at the start of the 2016/17 season.
