= Parham, Antigua and Barbuda =

Parham
- Town
- Town of Parham
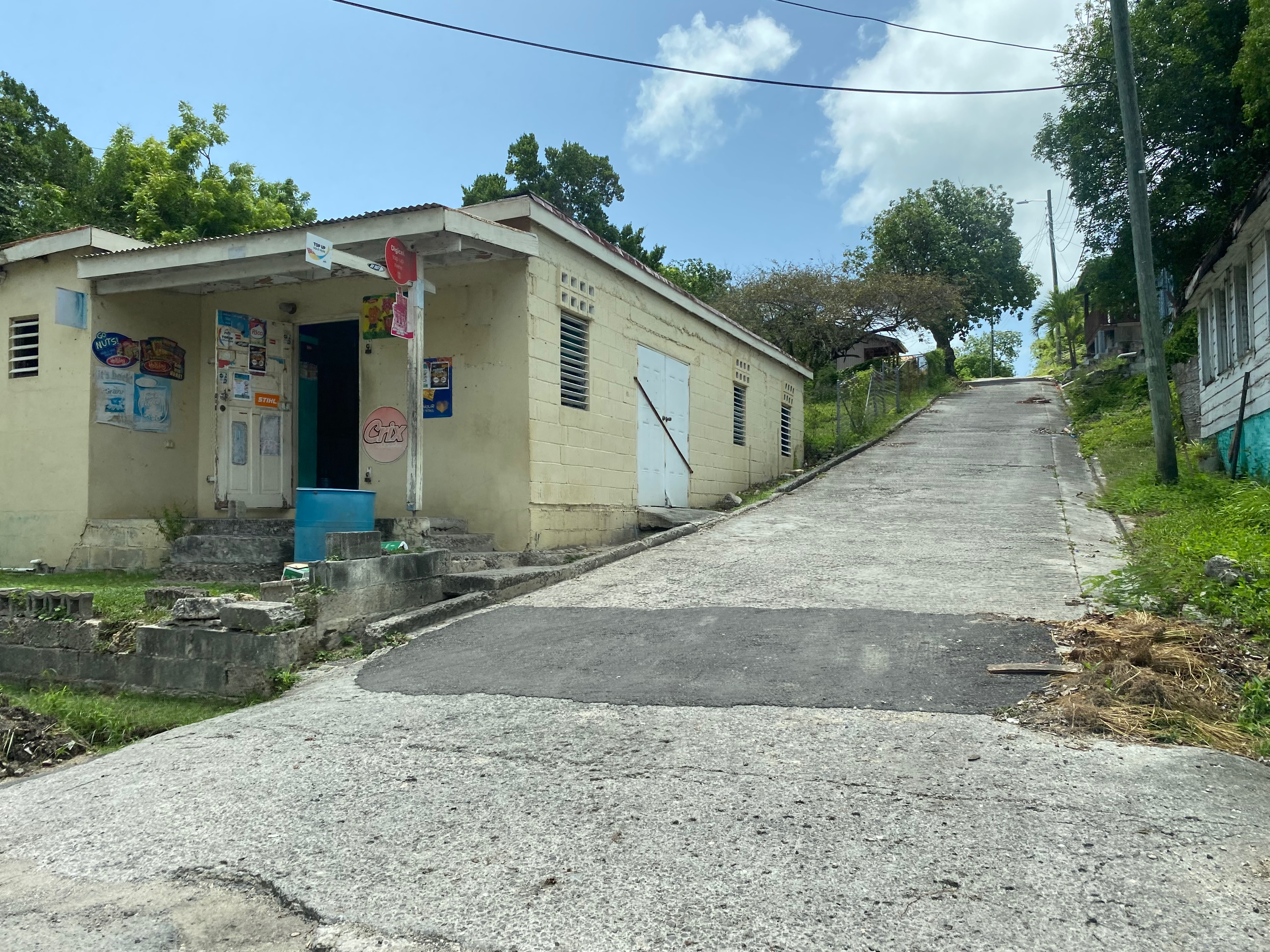
- A street in Parham
- Interactive map of the Parham main place
- Location within Antigua and Barbuda
- Coordinates: 17°06′37.50″N 61°46′04.09″W
- Country: Antigua and Barbuda
- Island: Antigua
- Civil parish: Saint Peter Parish (capital)

Government
  - Representative: Rawdon Turner

Area
  - Town: 1.99 km^{2} (0.77 sq mi)

Population (2011)
  - Town: 1,307
  - Metro: 3,499
- Demonym: Parhamite
- Time zone: UTC-4 (AST)
- Website: parhamtown.org

Parham (/pɑːɹʊm/; North Antiguan: Paarum), officially known as the Town of Parham, is the capital of Saint Peter, the largest city in Saint Peter, and the fourteenth largest city in Antigua and Barbuda. Parham's population was 1,307 in 2011, distributed over 1.99 square kilometres. Parham is situated on the shore of Parham Harbour, one of the most important harbors in the country, enclosed by the Crabbs Peninsula and Long Island.

Parham comprises four main neighbourhoods: Lovers Lane, Parham Market, Byam Wharf, and the School neighborhood. If the Saint Peter portion of All Saints, home to 1,954 people extending across three parishes, is considered a separate city, Parham would be regarded as the second largest city of Saint Peter. The major division of Parham, the town's metropolitan area, stretching over the eastern portion of the parish, had a 2011 population of 3,499 people.

== Etymology ==
The town was given its name in 1675 when a British naval officer by the name of Lord Willoughby de Parham arrived from England with a patent from King Charles II, allowing him to designate Parham as one of the six trading towns in colonial Antigua while also establishing it as the capital of the colony.

== History ==
St Peter's Anglican Church at Parham, Antigua Island

Parham served as a significant trading port for the importing of slaves from West Africa and the sale of rum and sugar to England during the colonial era. The agricultural products of the St. Peter, St. Phillip, and St. George parishes were sold at Parham Harbour. Around 1750, the Parham sugar mill was divided into two separate enterprises, each with its own windmill and boiling house. As a result of the St. Peter's Anglican Parish Church's construction in 1840, Parham would not have seen its heyday and peak population until the middle of the nineteenth century, during the height of the Industrial Revolution and the early days of freedom.

The Parham Anglican Primary School and the Parham Anglican Rectory were also built at that time. The Antigua Almanac, a newspaper from the 19th century, claimed that the people these initiatives drew would have turned the town of Parham into the island's capital once more.

When sugar prices collapsed in the early to mid-20th century, the most sugar planters departed the island, and the descendants of freed slaves from the nearby sugar plantations are likely to have moved into Parham. They maintained the town's existence as a flourishing commercial hub by engaging in trades, including fishing, farming, carpentry, and masonry. Massive emigration caused by the collapse of the sugar industry in the 1960s and 1970s led to a population loss in Parham that has not been replaced or recovered from to this day. Agriculture and fishing continue to be the mainstays of the neighborhood economy.

== Geography ==
Parham is on the shore of Parham Harbour, a well-protected anchorage.

== Demographics ==
Parham is subdivided into six enumeration districts, Lovers Lane, Parham Market, Byams Wharf, Parham School #1, Parham School #2, and Parham School #3. The centre of Parham is located in the Parham Market neighborhood, and is home to four of Parham's 39 business owners.

- 50700 Parham-LoversLane
- 50800 Parham-Market
- 50900 Parham-ByamsWharf
- 51001 Parham-School_1
- 51002 Parham-School_2

=== Census data (2011) ===
Q48 Ethnic	Counts	%
African descendent	998	92.06%
Caucasian/White	5	0.47%
East Indian/India	3	0.28%
Mixed (Black/White)	17	1.61%
Mixed (Other)	44	4.06%
Hispanic	6	0.57%
Other	8	0.76%
Don't know/Not stated	2	0.19%
Total	1,084	100.00%

Q49 Religion	Counts	%
Adventist	192	18.17%
Anglican	251	23.81%
Baptist	32	3.01%
Church of God	26	2.43%
Evangelical	5	0.49%
Jehovah Witness	4	0.39%
Methodist	110	10.40%
Moravian	19	1.85%
Nazarene	13	1.26%
None/no religion	76	7.19%
Pentecostal	87	8.26%
Rastafarian	16	1.55%
Roman Catholic	38	3.60%
Weslyan Holiness	153	14.48%
Other	30	2.82%
Don't know/Not stated	3	0.29%
Total	1,055	100.00%
NotApp :	30	

Q58. Country of birth	Counts	%
Other Latin or North American countries	1	0.09%
Antigua and Barbuda	847	78.07%
Other Caribbean countries	2	0.19%
Canada	2	0.19%
Other Asian countries	1	0.09%
Dominica	31	2.84%
Dominican Republic	7	0.66%
Guyana	47	4.35%
Jamaica	33	3.02%
Monsterrat	5	0.47%
St. Kitts and Nevis	8	0.76%
St. Lucia	1	0.09%
St. Vincent and the Grenadines	10	0.95%
Trinidad and Tobago	3	0.28%
United Kingdom	4	0.38%
USA	30	2.74%
USVI United States Virgin Islands	7	0.66%
Not Stated	45	4.16%
Total	1,084	100.00%

Q71 Country of Citizenship 1	Counts	%
Antigua and Barbuda	933	86.01%
Other Caribbean countries	5	0.47%
Dominica	19	1.80%
Dominican Republic	3	0.28%
Guyana	33	3.02%
Jamaica	29	2.65%
Monsterrat	2	0.19%
St. Vincent and the Grenadines	3	0.28%
Trinidad and Tobago	1	0.09%
United Kingdom	2	0.19%
USA	23	2.08%
Other countries	2	0.19%
Not Stated	30	2.74%
Total	1,084	100.00%

Q71 Country of Citizenship 2 (Country of Second Citizenship)	Counts	%
Other Caribbean countries	7	6.93%
Canada	4	3.96%
Other Asian and Middle Eastern countries	1	0.99%
Dominica	14	13.86%
Dominican Republic	3	2.97%
Guyana	15	14.85%
Jamaica	9	8.91%
Monsterrat	3	2.97%
St. Lucia	1	0.99%
St. Vincent and the Grenadines	7	6.93%
Trinidad and Tobago	2	1.98%
United Kingdom	2	1.98%
USA	33	31.68%
Other countries	1	0.99%
Total	104	100.00%
NotApp :	981	

Employment status	Counts	%
Employed	466	56.80%
Unemployed	63	7.62%
Inactive	290	35.33%
Not stated	2	0.25%
Total	821	100.00%
NotApp :	263	

Q91 Business Earning (Earnings a business made)	Counts	%
Under 1,000 $EC per month	10	27.03%
1,000 to 1,999 $EC per month	10	27.03%
2,000 to 2,999 $EC per month	9	24.32%
3,000 to 4,999 $EC per month	6	16.22%
5,000 $EC and over per month	2	5.41%
Total	38	100.00%
NotApp :	1,037	
Missing :	9	

Q55 Internet Use	Counts	%
Yes	507	46.79%
No	568	52.36%
Don't know/Not stated	9	0.85%
Total	1,084	100.00%

Q117 MoneyOverseas (Money from friends and relatives overseas)	Counts	%
Under 100 EC$	779	94.88%
100 to 499 EC$	9	1.12%
500 to 999 EC$	13	1.62%
1,000 to 1,999 EC$	7	0.87%
2,000 to 4,999 EC$	7	0.87%
5,000 to 99,999 EC$	5	0.62%
Total	821	100.00%
NotApp :	263	

== Attractions ==
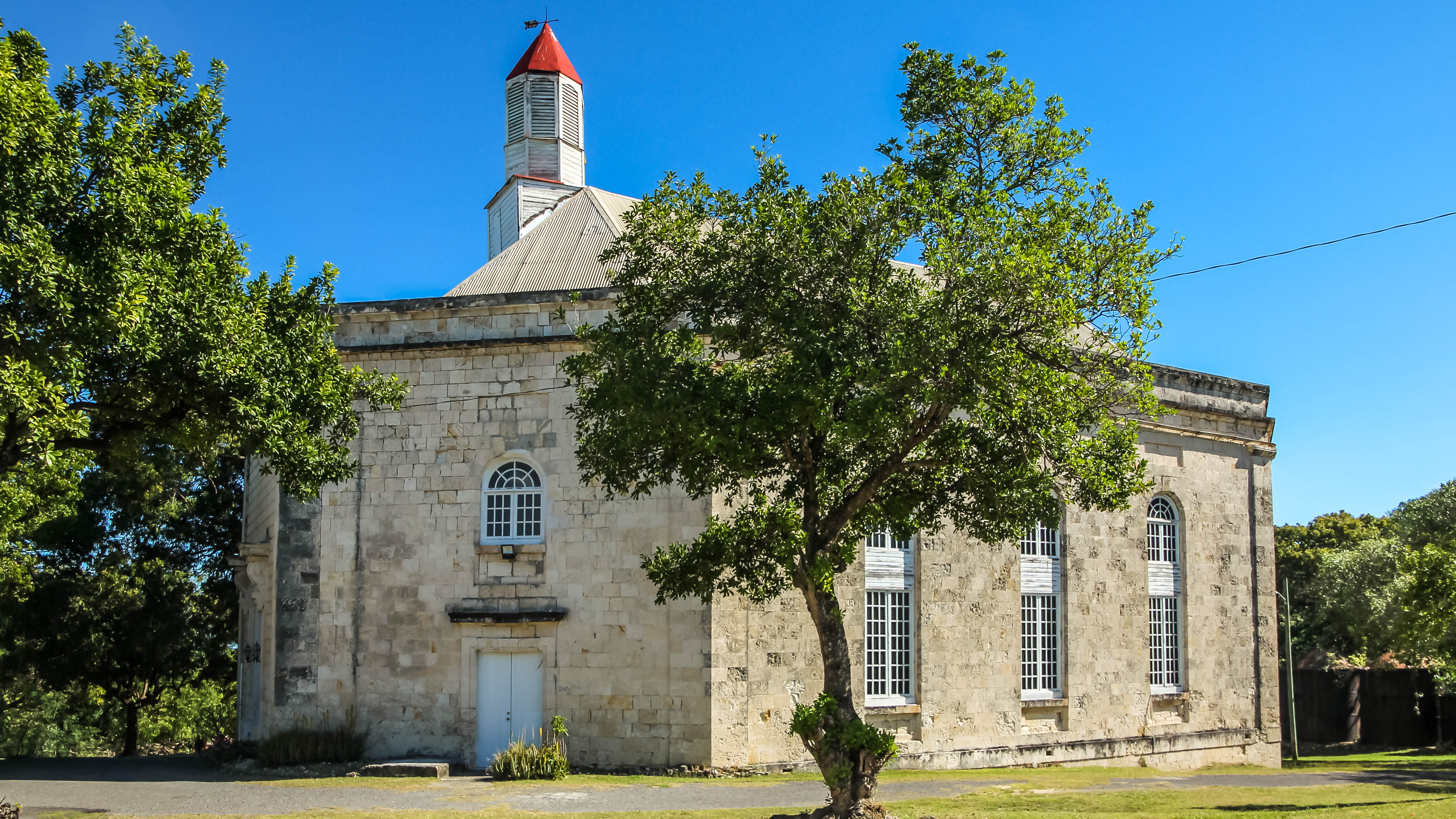
Parham: St. Peter's Anglican Church

- Parham Hill, a well-preserved colonial home.
- Great Bird Island, in Parham Harbor
- St. Peter's Anglican Church was built in 1840 by eminent English architect Thomas Weekes.

== Law enforcement ==
In January 2021, the Parham Police were moved to a temporary headquarters in the ticket booth in the Sir Vivian Richards Stadium, until a new police station can be constructed, with the old one being demolished.

== See also ==
- Category:Antigua
