= Pigotts Bullets F.C. =

Association football club in Antigua and Barbuda

Pigotts Bullets Football Club
- Full name: Pigotts Bullets Football Club
- Nickname: Bullets
- Founded: 1980
- Ground: Pigotts Sports Ground ("The Trough"), Pigotts, Antigua
- League: Premier Division
- 2025–2026: 5th

The Pigotts Bullets Football Club is an Antigua and Barbuda Football Association team playing in the Antigua and Barbuda Premier Division. The club was founded in 1980. After working their way through the ranks, they secured a spot in the Premier Division after the 2010–11 season.
