= Parham F.C. =

Association football club in Antigua and Barbuda

- Full name: Parham Football Club
- Ground: Antigua Recreation Ground; St John's, Antigua and Barbuda
- Capacity: 9,000
- League: Premier Division
- 2024–25: 11th
Home colours	Away colours

Parham Football Club is an Antiguan professional football team playing in the Antigua and Barbuda Premier Division. The club is based in Parham, Antigua.

== History ==
Parham are a four-time champion of the Antigua and Barbuda Premier Division, most recently in 2014–15.

== Achievements ==
- Antigua and Barbuda Premier Division: 5

2001–02, 2002–03, 2010–11, 2014–15, 2016–17.

- Antigua and Barbuda FA Cup: 1

2011–12

== Players ==
Note: Flags indicate national team as defined under FIFA eligibility rules; some limited exceptions apply. Players may hold more than one non-FIFA nationality.

No.	Pos.	Nation	Player
—	GK	ATG	Davrick Lockhart
—	GK	CUB	Odelín Molina
—	DF	ATG	John Francies
—	DF	JAM	Kenneth Goulbourne
—	DF	ATG	Akeem Thomas
—	DF	ATG	Karanja Mack
—	DF	ATG	Jeremiah Harritte
—	MF	ATG	Devon Oliver

No.	Pos.	Nation	Player
—	MF	ATG	Kelvin Ferrance
—	MF	ATG	Tevaughn Harriette
—	MF	VIN	Nazir McBurnette
—	MF	ATG	Jawarn Locker
—	MF	ATG	Winston Roberts
—	MF	ATG	Rondolph Burton
—	FW	ATG	Gayson Gregory
—	MF	ATG	Denie Henry
