= Empire F.C. =

Association football club in Antigua and Barbuda

Empire FC
- Full name: Empire Football Club
- Founded: 1962; 64 years ago
- Ground: Antigua Recreation Ground
- Capacity: 12,000
- Manager: Steveroy Anthony
- League: First Division
- 2024–25: 6th

Empire Football Club is an Antiguan association football club based in the Gray's Farm, neighborhood of St. John's, Antigua and Barbuda. The club is the most successful Antiguan football club winning the Antigua and Barbuda Premier Division on thirteen occasions.

== Honors ==
- Antigua and Barbuda Premier Division
  - Champions (13): 1969, 1970, 1971, 1972, 1973, 1974–75, 1978–79, 1987–88, 1991–92, 1997–98, 1998–99, 1999–2000, 2000–01
- Antigua and Barbuda First Division
  - Winners (2): 2014–15, 2019–20
