= SAP F.C. =

Association football club in Antigua and Barbuda

S.A.P F.C.
- Full name: Spirit, Attitude, Performance
- Founded: 1979; 47 years ago
- Ground: Antigua Recreation Ground; St John's, Antigua and Barbuda
- Manager: Charles Weston
- Coach: Janeel "Board" Simon
- League: First Division (II)
- 2024–25: 3rd

The S.A.P Football Club is an Antiguan professional football team playing in the Antigua and Barbuda Premier Division. It is based in Bolans. SAP stands for Spirit, Attitude & Performance.

== History ==
SAP Football Club originated in 1979 in Bolans Village by a group of friends who were often considered outcast by the villagers. As of such, the guys did everything together; ate, prayed, smoke, attended school, worked and played football together. A customary practice for the fellas was cooking and naming their dishes. These names range from, Yham Till You Drop, Bun Up Joe, Belly Full, Bun Bottom etc. However, they frequently cooked a meal called Sappy Rice.

So when the guys decided to form a football team in 1977 to play in the Bolans Community League they called their team Sappy, a derivation from the dish Sappy Rice.

In 1979 they joined ABFA League and renamed the team SAP and became the first club from the south side of Antigua to become a member of the Antigua & Barbuda Football Association.

By the beginning of the ’90s, the acronym for SAP became known as Success through Application and Practice. However, this was never made official and in 1999 was changed to Spirit, Attitude, Performance and still remains the same today.

SAP FC have clinched the Antiguan league title three times. As champions of the 2008–2009 Antigua & Barbuda Premier Division, they have qualified for the 2010 CFU Club Championship.

== Achievements ==
- Antigua and Barbuda Premier Division: 3

1988-89, 2005–06, 2008–09

- Antigua and Barbuda FA Cup: 2

2004-05, 2008–09

- Antigua and Barbuda Charity Shield: 1

2004-05

== Performance in CONCACAF competitions ==
- CFU Club Championship: 2 appearances

Best: 2006–07 Group Phase – 6 pts

Year	Opponent	1st leg	2nd leg
2006–07	(Trinidad and Tobago) San Juan Jabloteh	0–4	
	(United States Virgin Islands) New Vibes	3–1	
	(Aruba) SV Britannia	7–1	

== Current squad ==
As of 12 December 2006

Nationality given from place of birth Note: Flags indicate national team as defined under FIFA eligibility rules; some limited exceptions apply. Players may hold more than one non-FIFA nationality.

No.	Pos.	Nation	Player
—	GK	ATG	Teon Nathaniel
—	DF	ATG	Daniel McKell
—	DF	ATG	Michael Murray
—	DF	ATG	Odell Murray
—	DF	ATG	Kerry Parker
—	DF	ATG	Brian Samuel
—	DF	ATG	Trevor Tonge
—	MF	ATG	Blaire Christian

No.	Pos.	Nation	Player
—	MF	ATG	Jaroy Jefferey
—	MF	ATG	Lawson Lemerick
—	MF	ATG	Karanja Mack
—	MF	ATG	Teran Williams
—	MF	ATG	Tyio Simon (Captain)
—	FW	ATG	Kevin Aaron
16	FW	ATG	Peter Byers
—	FW	ATG	Okeem Challenger

== Top scorer ==
Peter Byers
Detail	League	Cup	Concacaf competition	Total
Goals	119	9	2	130
