= Antigua and Barbuda First Division =

- Country: Antigua and Barbuda
- Confederation: CONCACAF
- Level on pyramid: 2
- Promotion to: Premier Division
- Relegation to: Second Division
- Current champions: Ottos Rangers FC (2024/2025)

The Antigua and Barbuda First Division is the men's second division football league of the Caribbean island nation of Antigua and Barbuda. The league is sanctioned by the Antigua and Barbuda Football Association. Winners are promoted to the Premier Division while bottom-finishers are relegated to the Second Division.

== Format ==
League winners are automatically promoted while the second-place finishers participate in a promotion/relegation play-off with the second-to-last finisher in the Premier Division.
