= Hoppers F.C. =

Association football club in Antigua and Barbuda

Greenbay Hoppers F.C.
- Full name: Hoppers Football Club
- Founded: 1969
- Ground: Antigua Recreation Ground; St John's, Antigua and Barbuda
- Capacity: 9,000
- Chairman: Rohan Gordon
- Manager: Samuel Whitfield
- League: Antigua and Barbuda Premier Division
- 2024–25: 14th

Hoppers Football Club is an Antiguan professional football club playing in the Antigua and Barbuda Premier Division. It is based in Greenbay.

== History ==
The Greenbay Hoppers FC is a nonprofit organization which was formed over 40 years ago. One of the founders, Mr. Londel Benjamin, who was president until 2009, along with fathers, grandfathers and uncles of present players organized a football team from the Greenbay community.

Greenbay Hoppers FC took part in the CFU Club Championship in an attempt to qualify for the CONCACAF Champions Cup.

== Achievements ==
- Antigua and Barbuda Premier Division: 2

2015–16, 2017–18

- CTV Warriors' Cup: 1

2005

== Performance in CONCACAF competitions ==
- CFU Club Championship: 2 appearances

Best: 2005 Quarter-Finals – Lost against (Jamaica) Portmore United 10 – 0 on aggregate

Year	Opponent	1st leg	2nd leg
2005	(Dominica) Grand Bazaar	2–1	4–0
	(Jamaica) Portmore United	0–3	0–7
2006–07	Puerto Rico Islanders	1–3	
	(Trinidad and Tobago) W Connection	0–5	
