= Old Road F.C. =

Association football club in Antigua and Barbuda

Old Road FC
- Full name: Old Road Football Club
- Ground: Antigua Recreation Ground; St John's, Antigua and Barbuda
- Capacity: 9,000
- League: Premier Division
- 2025–26: 5th

Old Road Football Club is an Antiguan professional football team playing in the Antigua and Barbuda Premier Division. The club is based in Old Road, Antigua.

== History ==
Old Road are a two time champion of the Antigua and Barbuda Premier Division, having won back to back titles in 2011-12 & 2012–13.

== Former players ==
- (Argentina) Luciano Cigno

== Achievements ==
- Antigua and Barbuda Premier Division
  - Champions (2): 2011–12, 2012–13
  - Runners-up (1): 2009–10
