= Antigua Recreation Ground =

Sports venue in Antigua and Barbuda

Coordinates: 17°07′20″N 61°50′21″W

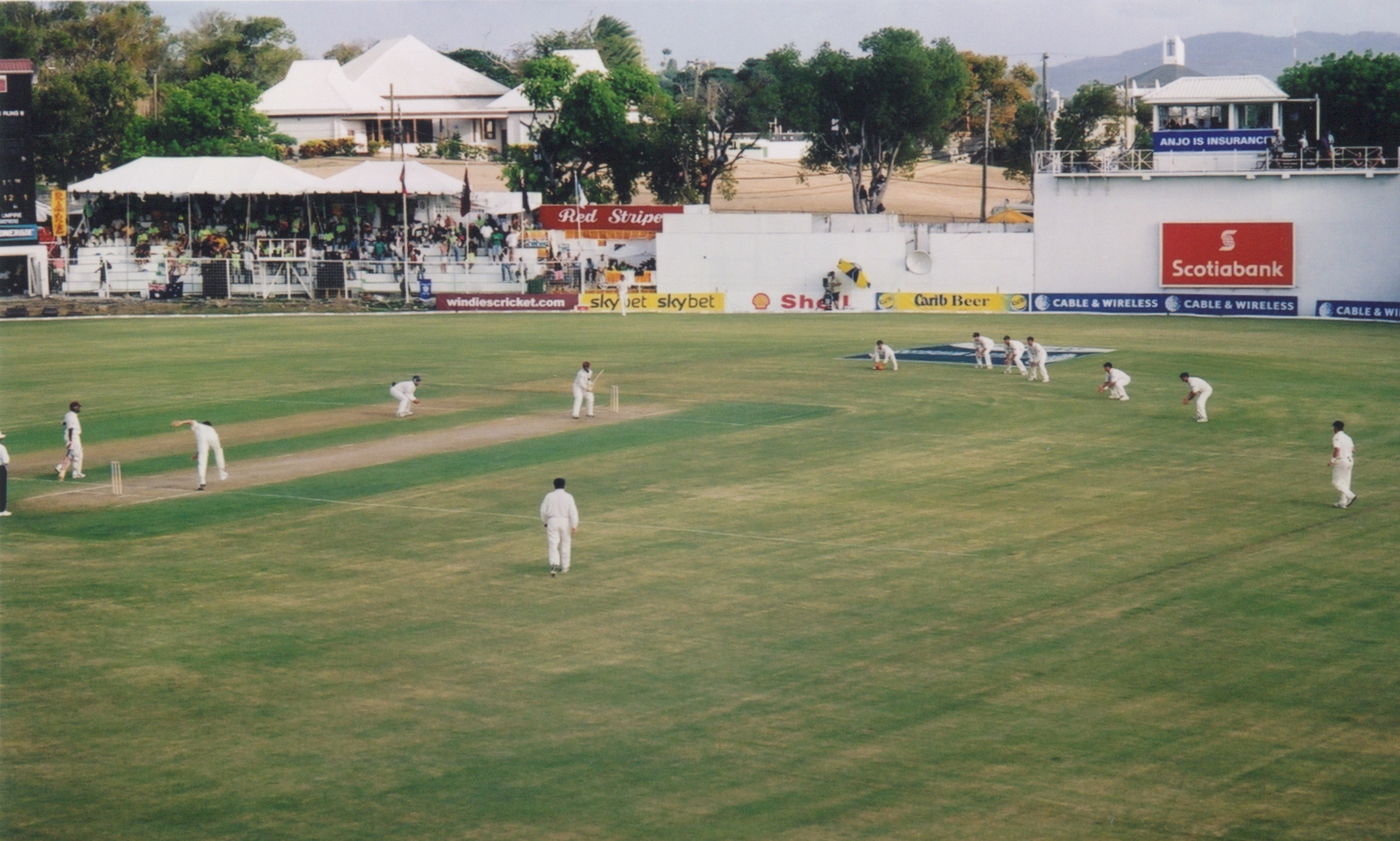
- West Indies v Australia in May 2003
- Interactive map of Antigua Recreation Ground

Ground information
- Location: Antigua
- Country: West Indies
- Establishment: 1978
- Capacity: 9,000
- End names
- Pavilion End; Factory Road End

International information
- First men's Test: 28 Mar – 1 Apr 1981: West Indies v England
- Last men's Test: 15–19 Feb 2009: West Indies v England
- First men's ODI: 22 Feb 1978: West Indies v Australia
- Last men's ODI: 28 Feb 2007: Bangladesh v Canada
- As of 21 February 2009; Source: Antigua Recreation Ground, Cricinfo

Antigua Recreation Ground is the national stadium of Antigua and Barbuda. It is located in St. John's, on the island of Antigua. The ground has been used by the West Indies cricket team and Antigua and Barbuda national football team. It had Test cricket status. It was also known as the Old Recreation Ground, or the Old Rec. against England in the "Blackwash" series of 1986 at the Recreation Ground. It was also where Brian Lara twice set the record for highest individual Test innings, scoring 375 in 1994 and the current record of 400 not out in 2004, both times against England.

In May 2003 the West Indies completed the highest ever successful run chase in Test Cricket at the ARG, making 418/7 against Australia in their fourth innings to win by 3 wickets.

Antigua is considered to be a good wicket on which to bat – hard and dry whilst not offering much bounce or movement to bowlers. This is colloquially known as a "featherbed".

After the building of the Sir Vivian Richards Stadium for the 2007 World Cup, no further Test cricket was expected at the Recreation Ground. However, due to the abandonment of the Second Test between West Indies v England on 13 February 2009 after just ten balls (due to an unfit outfield), an extra Test, called the Third Test, began at the Antigua Recreation Ground on 15 February 2009, despite concerns about the dilapidated condition of the stadium.

Like many other cricket grounds in the Caribbean, the Antigua Recreation Ground traditionally hosts a variety of off the field entertainment, particularly music, both live and recorded, during breaks in play. For many years, an entertainer called Gravy would operate in the stands, usually in fancy dress.

== List of five-wicket hauls ==
A total of 16 five-wicket hauls were taken in Test matches on the ground.

Five-wicket hauls in Men's Test matches at Antigua Recreation Ground (Note: Additionally, Dennis Lillee took 6/125 for the WSC Australians against the WSC West Indies in the 5th Supertest during the 1979 World Series Cricket tour of the West Indies)
No.	Bowler	Date	Team	Opposing Team	Inn	O	R	W	Result
1	Colin Croft	27 March 1981	West Indies	England	1	25	74	6	Drawn
2	Carl Rackemann (Note: Rackemann and Garner took their give-wicket hauls in the same match.)	7 April 1984	Australia	West Indies	2	42.4	161	5	West Indies won
3	Joel Garner	7 April 1984	West Indies	Australia	3	20.5	63	5	West Indies won
4	Ian Bishop	12 April 1990	West Indies	England	1	28.1	84	5	West Indies won
5	Waqar Younis	1 May 1993	Pakistan	West Indies	1	28	104	5	Drawn
6	Courtney Walsh	8 April 1995	West Indies	Australia	1	21.3	54	6	Drawn
7	Curtly Ambrose (Note: Ambrose and Morrison took their five-wicket hauls during the same match.)	27 April 1996	West Indies	New Zealand	2	32	68	5	Drawn
8	Danny Morrison	27 April 1996	New Zealand	West Indies	3	20	61	5	Drawn
9	Curtly Ambrose (Note: Ambrose and Muralitharan took their five-wicket hauls during the same match.)	13 June 1997	West Indies	Sri Lanka	1	13.1	37	5	West Indies won
10	Muttiah Muralitharan	13 June 1997	Sri Lanka	West Indies	2	23.4	34	5	West Indies won
11	Curtly Ambrose	3 April 1999	West Indies	Australia	1	29.5	94	5	Australia won
12	Courtney Walsh (Note: Walsh's and both of Wasim Akram's five-wicket hauls were taken during the same match.)	25 May 2000	West Indies	Pakistan	1	26	83	5	West Indies won
13	Wasim Akram	25 May 2000	Pakistan	West Indies	2	26.2	61	6	West Indies won
14	Wasim Akram	25 May 2000	Pakistan	West Indies	4	30	49	5	West Indies won
15	Jermaine Lawson	9 May 2003	West Indies	Australia	1	19.1	78	7	West Indies won
16	Graeme Swann	15 February 2009	England	West Indies	2	24	57	5	Drawn

== See also ==
- Cricket
- 2007 Cricket World Cup
- List of Test cricket grounds
- Stanford Cricket Ground
- Sir Vivian Richards Stadium
