= 1969 American Soccer League =

American Soccer League 1969 season
- Season: 1969
- Teams: 8
- Top goalscorer: Jim Lefkos (22)
- Longest unbeaten run: Washington Darts (19)

Statistics of the American Soccer League II for the 1969 season.

== League standings ==
Northern Division
Team	Pld	W	D	L	GF	GA	Pts
Syracuse Scorpions	20	12	5	3	53	26	29
Rochester Lancers	20	12	5	3	41	18	29
Boston Astros	20	5	0	15	24	48	10
New York Inter	20	2	4	14	20	44	8

Southern Division
Team	Pld	W	D	L	GF	GA	Pts
Washington Darts	20	14	5	1	46	11	33
Philadelphia Spartans	20	7	5	8	26	32	19
Philadelphia Ukrainians	20	7	5	8	27	38	19
Newark Ukrainian Sitch	20	6	1	13	34	54	13

== ASL All-Stars ==
First Team	Position	Second Team
Lincoln Phillips, Washington	G	Walt Tarnawsky, Philadelphia Spart.
Frank Donlavey, Syracuse	D	Carl Yakovino, Philadelphia Spart.
Charlie Mitchell, Rochester	D	Robert Watson, Philadelphia Ukran.
Alberto Trik, Philadelphia Ukran.	M	Eddie Barker, Rochester
Willie Evans, Washington	M	Winston Earle, Syracuse
Jose Montero, Boston	M	______ Dalmago, Washington
John Kerr, Washington	F	Wagner Leao, Boston
Yaw Kankam, Syracuse	F	Tibor Vigh, Rochester
Jim Lefkos, Syracuse	F	Juan Paletta, Philadelphia Spart.
Frank Odoi, Syracuse	F	Marion Oleksyn, Newark
Gerry Browne, Washington	F	Carlos Metidieri, Rochester

== Playoffs ==
=== Bracket ===
Northern Division playoff (single match)			ASL Championship (2-match aggregate)
			S1	Washington Darts	2	2	4
N1a	Syracuse Scorpions	2	N1	Syracuse Scorpions	0	0	0
N1b	Rochester Lancers	1

=== Northern Division playoff ===
October 11	Rochester Lancers	1–2	Syracuse Scorpions	Aquinas Memorial Stadium • Att. 2,456

=== Championship final ===
Team 1	Aggregate	Team 2	First leg	Second leg	Attendance
Syracuse Scorpions	0–4	Washington Darts	0–2	0–2	September 19 • Griffin Field • ??? September 26 • Brookland Stadium • 3,976

==== First leg ====
October 19, 1969
2:30 PM EST

Syracuse Scorpions	0–2	Washington Darts
	Report	Kerr 39' (Gyau); Browne 41'

Griffin Field, Liverpool, New York
Attendance: ???

==== Second leg ====
October 26, 1969
EST

Washington Darts	2–0	Syracuse Scorpions
Browne 5'; Gyau 86' (Kerr)	Report

Brookland Stadium, Washington, D.C.
Attendance: 3,976

1969 ASL Champions: Washington Darts (4-0 aggregate)

== Season awards ==
- Most Valuable Player: Jim Lefkos, Syracuse
- Coach of the Year: Lincoln Phillips, Washington
- Manager of the Year: Walter Bahr, Philadelphia Spartans
- Rookie of the Year: Bob DiLuca, Rochester
- Most Improved Player: Jerry Kliveka, Philadelphia Spartans
