= NASL Final 1970 =

Soccer match

- Event: NASL Final
Rochester Lancers	Washington Darts
4	3
- on aggregate

First leg
Rochester Lancers	Washington Darts
3	0
- Date: September 5, 1970
- Venue: Aquinas Memorial Stadium, Rochester, New York
- Referee: Mike Ashkenazi
- Attendance: 9,321

Second leg
Washington Darts	Rochester Lancers
3	1
- Date: September 13, 1970
- Venue: Brookland Stadium, Washington, D.C.
- Attendance: 5,543

NASL Final 1970 was the North American Soccer League's postseason championship final of the 1970 season. As no championship game was played for the 1969 season, it was the first championship game since the 1968 season. The event was contested in a two-game aggregate match between the Rochester Lancers and the Washington Darts. The first leg was held on September 5, 1970 at Aquinas Memorial Stadium in Rochester, New York, with the Lancers victorious by a score of 3–0. The second leg was played on September 13, 1970 at Brookland Stadium in Washington, D.C. That day the Darts came out on top by the score of 3–1. Renato Costa, who played under the alias of "Raul Herrera" that year, scored three of Rochester's four goals. With the two-legged competition completed, the Rochester Lancers held a 4–3 aggregate lead and were crowned the 1970 NASL champions.

== Background ==
The Rochester Lancers and the Washington Darts respectively won the Northern Division and Southern Division of the NASL. This earned each team the right to compete for the league title.

== Series summary ==
Champion	Runner-up	Game 1	Venue	Game 2	Venue	Agg.
Rochester Lancers	Washington Darts	3–0	Aquinas Memorial Stadium	1–3	Brookland Stadium	4–3

== Match details ==
=== First leg ===
NASL Final 1970
September 5
8:00 p.m. (EST)
First leg

Rochester Lancers	3–0	Washington Darts
Costa 26', 61'; Marotte 72' (pen.)	Report

Aquinas Memorial Stadium, Rochester, NY
Attendance: 9,321
Referee: Mike Ashkenazi

Rochester Lancers	Washington Darts

GK	1	(Brazil) Claude Campos
DF	2	(England) Phil Davis
DF	5	(England) Peter Short
DF	14	(Jamaica) Winston Earle
DF	3	(Scotland) Charlie Mitchell (c)
MF	15	(Ghana) Yeo Kankam
MF	16	(Ghana) Frank Odoi
MF	10	(Uruguay) Luis Marotte
FW	9	(Brazil) Renato Costa
FW	17	(Ghana) Gladstone Ofori
FW	11	(Brazil) Carlos Metidieri
Substitutes:
MF	7	(Brazil) Jesús Pelez Miranda	Substituted in
Manager:
(United States) Sal DeRosa

GK	1	(Trinidad and Tobago) Lincoln Phillips (Note: Lincoln Phillips was a player-coach for Rochester.)
DF	12	(Scotland) Frank Donlavey
DF	16	(Trinidad and Tobago) Winston Alexis
DF	13	(Ghana) Willie Evans (c)
DF	6	(Trinidad and Tobago) Victor Gamaldo
MF	10	(Scotland) Billy Fraser
MF	11	(Trinidad and Tobago) Warren Archibald
MF	17	(Scotland) Danny Paton
FW	7	(Ghana) Joseph Gyau
FW	15	(Argentina) Victorio Casa
FW	14	(Trinidad and Tobago) Leroy DeLeon
Substitutes:
F	8	(Scotland) John Muir	Substituted in
M	5	(Trinidad and Tobago) Bertrand Grell	Substituted in
Manager:
(Trinidad and Tobago) Lincoln Phillips

=== Second leg ===
September 13
3:00 p.m. (EST)
Second leg

Washington Darts	3–1	Rochester Lancers
DeLeon 44' (pen.); Gyau 49'; Browne 65'	Report	Costa 40'

Brookland Stadium, Washington, D.C.
Attendance: 5,543

Washington Darts	Rochester Lancers

GK	1	(Trinidad and Tobago) Lincoln Phillips
DF	12	(Scotland) Frank Donlavey
DF	3	(Trinidad and Tobago) Roland Crispin
DF	13	(Ghana) Willie Evans (c)
DF	6	(Trinidad and Tobago) Victor Gamaldo
MF	10	(Scotland) Billy Fraser
MF	11	(Trinidad and Tobago) Warren Archibald
MF	5	(Trinidad and Tobago) Bertrand Grell
FW	7	(Ghana) Joseph Gyau
FW	9	(Trinidad and Tobago) Gerry Browne
FW	14	(Trinidad and Tobago) Leroy DeLeon
Substitutes:
MF	17	(Scotland) Danny Paton	Substituted in
Manager:
(Trinidad and Tobago) Lincoln Phillips

GK	1	(Brazil) Claude Campos
DF	2	(England) Phil Davis
DF	5	(England) Peter Short
DF	14	(Jamaica) Winston Earle
DF	3	(Scotland) Charlie Mitchell (c)
MF	15	(Ghana) Yeo Kankam
MF	16	(Ghana) Frank Odoi
MF	10	(Uruguay) Luis Marotte
FW	9	(Brazil) Renato Costa
FW	17	(Ghana) Gladstone Ofori
FW	11	(Brazil) Carlos Metidieri
Substitutes:
MF	7	(Brazil) Jesús Pelez Miranda	Substituted in
Manager:
(United States) Sal DeRosa

Notes

1970 NASL Champions: Rochester Lancers

== Post-match ==
The Lancers were sent to the 1971 CONCACAF Champions' Cup as the first and only representative from the original NASL, alongside 1970 U.S. Open Cup winners Elizabeth S.C.

== See also ==
- 1970 North American Soccer League season
