= 1970 North American Soccer League season =

Soccer league season

North American Soccer League 1970 season
- Season: 1970
- Champions: Rochester Lancers
- Premiers: Washington Darts
- 1971 CONCACAF Champions' Cup: Rochester Lancers
- Matches: 84
- Goals: 253 (3.01 per match)
- Top goalscorer: (Greece) Koulis Apostolidis (16 goals)
- Average attendance: 3,163

Statistics of North American Soccer League in season 1970. This was the 3rd season of the NASL.

== Overview ==
Six teams competed with the Rochester Lancers winning the championship. Santos FC of Brazil beat the NASL All-Stars 4–3 at Soldier Field in Chicago to finish the season. In 1970, NASL teams rounded out their schedules by playing an assortment of foreign clubs including Hapoel Petah Tikva, Varzim, Hertha Berlin and Coventry City. These games weren't just for attendance but also counted in the standings. The Washington Darts went 2-2-0 versus the international teams earning the "International Cup".

== Changes from the previous season ==
=== New teams ===
- Rochester Lancers*
- Washington Darts*

*joined from American Soccer League

=== Teams folding ===
- Baltimore Bays

=== Teams moving ===
- None

=== Name changes ===
- None

== Map of clubs ==
Northern Division Southern Division

== Regular season ==
W = Wins, L = Losses, T= Ties, GF = Goals For, GA = Goals Against, PT= point system

6 points for a win, 3 points for a tie, 0 points for a loss, 1 point for each goal scored up to three per game.

-Premiers (most points). -Other playoff team.

Northern Division	W	L	T	GF	GA	PT
Rochester Lancers	9	9	6	41	45	111
Kansas City Spurs	8	10	6	42	44	100
St. Louis Stars	5	17	2	26	71	60

Southern Division	W	L	T	GF	GA	PT
Washington Darts	14	6	4	52	29	137
Atlanta Chiefs	11	8	5	53	33	123
Dallas Tornado	8	12	4	39	39	92

== NASL All-Stars ==
First Team	Position	Second Team
(Trinidad and Tobago) Lincoln Phillips, Washington	G	(Uruguay) Leonel Conde, Kansas City
(Scotland) Charlie Mitchell, Rochester	D	(England) John Cocking, Atlanta
(Brazil) Uriel da Veiga, Atlanta	D	(Jamaica) Delroy Scott, Atlanta
(Ghana) Willie Evans, Washington	M	(England) Ray Bloomfield, Atlanta
(United States) John Best, Dallas	M	(United States) Roy Turner, Dallas
(Scotland) Billy Fraser, Washington	M	(Canada) Bob DiLuca, Rochester
(United States) Carlos Metidieri, Rochester	F	(Trinidad and Tobago) Warren Archibald, Washington
(England) Dave Metchick, Atlanta	F	(Brazil) Clarival Oliveira, Kansas City
(Jamaica) Art Welch, Atlanta	F	(Greece) Kirk Apostolidis, Dallas
(Trinidad and Tobago) Leroy DeLeon, Washington	F	(United States) Mike Renshaw, Dallas
(United States) Manfred Seissler, Kansas City	F	(United States) Pat McBride, St. Louis

== NASL Final 1970 ==
Northern Champions	Aggregate	Southern Champions	First leg	Second leg	Attendance
Rochester Lancers	4–3	Washington Darts	3–0	1–3	September 5 • Aquinas Memorial Stadium • 9,321; September 13 • Brookland Stadium • 5,543

=== First leg ===
September 5
8:00 PM (EST)

Rochester Lancers	3–0	Washington Darts
Costa 26' (Kankam); Costa 61' (Ofori); Marotte 72' (pen.)	Report

Aquinas Memorial Stadium, Rochester, New York
Attendance: 9,321
Referee: Mike Ashkenazi

=== Second leg ===
September 13
3:00 PM (EST)

Washington Darts	3–1	Rochester Lancers
DeLeon 44' (pen.); Gyau 49' (Grell); Browne 65' (Archibald)	Report	Costa 40' (Metidieri)

Brookland Stadium, Washington, DC
Attendance: 5,543

1970 NASL Champions: Rochester Lancers

== Post season awards ==
- Most Valuable Player: (United States) Carlos Metidieri, Rochester
- Coach of the year: (United States) Sal DeRosa, Rochester
- Rookie of the year: (United States) Jim Leeker, St. Louis
