= Sal DeRosa =

American soccer coach (1931–2014)

Personal information
- Full name: Salvatore DeRosa
- Date of birth: August 10, 1931
- Place of birth: Pignataro Maggiore, Italy
- Date of death: March 2, 2014 (aged 82)
- Place of death: Getzville, New York, U.S.

Managerial career
- Years: Team
- Italian Army team
- 1968–69: Syracuse Scorpions (ASL)
- 1970–71: Rochester Lancers (NASL)
- 1972: Miami Gatos (NASL)
- 1973: Rochester Lancers (NASL)
- 1979–80: Buffalo Stallions (MISL)

Salvatore "Sal" DeRosa (August 10, 1931 – March 2, 2014) was a naturalized American soccer coach best known for winning the 1970 North American Soccer League Championship with Rochester Lancers.

DeRosa competed professionally in Naples, Italy until a knee injury ended his playing days. Before settling in the United States in 1967, he had previously coached the Italian Army team and also served as an assistant for Italy's Olympic squad. Once in America, he served as coach, general manager and owner of the Syracuse Scorpions of the American Soccer League. In 1969, he guided the Scorpions to a tie at the top of the Northern Division and won a one match playoff for the division crown over Rochester, before losing to the Washington Darts in the ASL finals.

He took over as coach the Lancers (who had since moved to the NASL) midway through the 1970 season, bringing five of the Scorpions’ top players along with him, including midfielder Frank Odoi and goalie Claude Campos. Over the final thirteen games of the season, he guided the Lancers to a mark of 6-4-3 and into the NASL title series, defeating those same Washington Darts (who had also jumped leagues) by a two-match aggregate of 4–3. He also won the 1970 NASL Coach of the Year award. In 1971 the Lancers won the NASL regular season title under him, but lost in a grueling semi-final series to eventual champion Dallas. That year the Lancers also were awarded the NASL Governor's Cup, given to the squad with best record against foreign teams. This was in large part due to their 4th-place finish in the 1971 CONCACAF Champions' Cup, where they finished 4-1-2 (and +4 on goal dif) in all matches.

DeRosa went on to coach the Miami Gatos (formerly the Washington Darts) in 1972, before returning to Rochester to coach the Lancers for one more season. Several years later, Sal also served as vice-president and general manager of the Buffalo Stallions of the Major Indoor Soccer League and as their coach from 1979 to 1980. In 1977, he was named to the Rochester Lancers Team of the Decade. He founded the Buffalo Storm of the United Soccer League in 1984 and has served as special consultant and president of the citizens advisory committee for the Buffalo Blizzard of the NPSL in the 1990s. After leaving professional soccer altogether, he helped develop youth soccer clinics in the Buffalo area throughout the 1990s and into the 21st century.

He died at a nursing home on March 2, 2014.
