= 1971 NASL Professional Hoc-Soc Tournament =

Indoor soccer tournament in the United States

North American Soccer League -1971 Hoc-Soc Tournament-
1971 NASL Indoor Tournament

Tournament details
- Dates: March 19, 1971
- Teams: 4

Final positions
- Champions: Dallas Tornado (1st title)
- Runners-up: Rochester Lancers

Tournament statistics
- Matches played: 4
- Goals scored: 12 (3 per match)
- Attendance: 5,060 (1,265 per match)
- Top scorer(s): (United States) Mike Renshaw (United States) Jim Benedek (Canada) Dragan Popović (2 goals)
- Best player: (United States) Mike Renshaw

The 1971 NASL Professional Hoc-Soc Tournament was the first indoor variant of soccer sanctioned by the North American Soccer League. It was held in St. Louis, Missouri on the evening of March 19, 1971 and involved four of the league's eight franchises.

== Overview ==
Indoor soccer tournaments had been played in one form or another in North America throughout much of the 20th century, but 1971 marked the first time that a Division One professional league organized an indoor competition for its member clubs. The total purse was $2,800. The winning side received $1,000, while the runners-up earned $750. The winners and losers of the third place match made $600 and $450 respectively.

The matches themselves were all played on March 19 at the St. Louis Arena. Individual matches lasted 30 minutes and were divided by an intermission into two 15-minute periods. Golden goal overtime was in place to break any tie after regulation time if needed. The first two matches were scheduled for 8:00 PM and 8:45 PM starts, with the others to follow at unspecified times.

Four of the NASL's five established franchises participated: the Dallas Tornado, Rochester Lancers, St. Louis Stars and Washington Darts. The Atlanta Chiefs did not. The other three NASL squads, Montreal, New York and Toronto, were all expansion teams set to begin play in the 1971 outdoor season, which itself was to begin a few weeks later.

=== Hoc-Soc rules ===
The basic premise of hoc-soc, was to combine several of the rules of hockey with small-side soccer. The playing surface was AstroTurf and the field dimensions were the same as a standard NHL hockey rink (200 feet by 85 feet), surrounded by dasher boards. The goals were set into the end boards and essentially cut in half (12 feet across by 8 feet high). As in hockey, the dasher boards were in play. Rosters were nine players strong, with six a side taking the field at the start of play. Free substitutions were permitted on the fly at the substituting team's own risk. Most fouls committed would result in a two-minute, sending-off penalty being assessed to the offending player, which would also give the opposition a hockey-style power play. The offending player's team would play short handed for two minutes or until the other team scored a goal –whichever occurred first. As there were no assistant referees, the standard offside rules of soccer did not apply to hoc-soc. This caused many at the time to predict that the scoring would be much higher than that of a conventional match.

Two specific rules were created to keep play moving. The first was that a player in their own defensive half was not permitted to kick the ball directly over the boards out of play. Doing so would result in a two-minute penalty for delay of game. The second allowed the goalie to clear the ball only by throwing the ball to teammates within the defensive half of the field. Kicking the ball to clear it or throwing the ball to a teammate beyond midfield would result in an indirect free kick from the spot of the illegal pass.

== Map of clubs ==
NASL Professional Hoc-Soc Tournament clubs

== Tournament recap ==
A crowd of 5,060 came out to witness the four back-to-back games. Eight minutes and five seconds into the opening match of the tournament, the home fans cheered as Jim Leeker put St. Louis ahead with the historic, first-ever NASL indoor goal. Their joy was short-lived as the Tornado rallied to defeat the Stars, 2–1, on the strength of two second-half goals by Jim Benedek. The second match saw the Lancers dispatch the Darts, 3–1. After a longer intermission, the losing teams, St. Louis and Washington, faced off in the Third Place match, with the Stars winning, 2–0. Dragan Popović scored both of St. Louis' goals. The evening culminated with the championship game between Dallas and Rochester. Tournament MVP Mike Renshaw was the man of the match with a pair of goals. After their 3–0 victory, the Dallas Tornado were crowned the NASL's professional hoc-soc champions.

Despite pre-tournament predictions, the score lines were not overly high (in fact, there were only 12 goals in the four games, or three per contest; in the 1971 NASL "outdoor" season, there were 292 goals scored in 89 games, or 3.28 per match). Pundits attributed this to the players' instinctive reluctance to play in offside positions, despite the nonexistence of such a rule in hoc-soc.

== Match results ==
=== Bracket ===
Opening round
Dallas Tornado	2
St. Louis Stars	1
Rochester Lancers	3
Washington Darts	1

Championship Final
Dallas Tornado	3
Rochester Lancers	0
Third place
St. Louis Stars	2
Washington Darts	0

=== Opening round ===
March 19, 1971 Game 1	St. Louis Stars	1–2	Dallas Tornado	St. Louis, Missouri
8:00 PM (CST)	Leeker ((McBride) 8:05)	Report	Benedek ((Berto)17:00); Benedek ((Renshaw) 21:00)	Stadium: St. Louis Arena; Attendance: 5,060; Referee: Larry King / Ray Puricelli

March 19, 1971 Game 2	Rochester Lancers	3–1	Washington Darts	St. Louis, Missouri
8:45 PM (CST)	Seissler ((Durante) 13:08); Durante (13:45); Metidieri ((Seissler) 29:43)	Report	Kerr (5:40)	Stadium: St. Louis Arena; Attendance: 5,060; Referee: Larry King / Ray Puricelli

=== Third-place match ===
March 19, 1971 3rd Place	St. Louis Stars	2–0	Washington Darts	St. Louis, Missouri
	Popović ((McBride) 16:27); Popović ((Leeker) 29:31)	Report		Stadium: St. Louis Arena; Attendance: 5,060; Referee: Larry King / Ray Puricelli

=== Championship final ===
March 19, 1971

Dallas Tornado	3–0	Rochester Lancers
Renshaw (12:15); Best ((Molnar) 28:11)	Report

St. Louis Arena, St. Louis, Missouri
Attendance: 5,060
Referee: Larry King / Ray Puricelli

== Tournament awards ==
- Most Valuable Player: (United States) Mike Renshaw (Dallas) - Goals: 2 Assists: 1
- All-tournament Team: (United States) Mike Renshaw (Dallas), (United States) Jim Benedek (Dallas), (United States) Manfred Seissler (Rochester), (England) Peter Short (Rochester), (Canada) Dragan Popović (St. Louis), (Brazil) Miguel de Lima (St. Louis)

== Final rankings ==
Pos = Final Position, G = Games, W = Wins, L = Losses, GF = Goals For, GA = Goals Against, GD = Goal Differential

Pos	Team	G	W	L	GF	GA	GD
1	Dallas Tornado	2	2	0	5	1	+4
2	Rochester Lancers	2	1	1	3	4	–1
3	St. Louis Stars	2	1	1	3	2	+1
4	Washington Darts	2	0	2	1	5	–4

== Statistical leaders ==
Goals (worth 2 points), A = Assists (worth 1 point)

Leading scorers	Goals	Assists	Points
(United States) Mike Renshaw (Dallas)	2	1	5
(United States) Jim Benedek (Dallas)	2	0	4
(Canada) Dragan Popović (St. Louis)	2	0	4
(Brazil) Eli Durante (Rochester)	1	1	3
(United States) Jim Leeker (St. Louis)	1	1	3
(United States) Manfred Seissler (Rochester)	1	1	3
(United States) John Best (Dallas)	1	0	2
(Canada) John Kerr (Washington)	1	0	2
(United States) Carlos Metidieri (Rochester)	1	0	2
(United States) Pat McBride (St. Louis)	0	2	2
(Brazil) Berto (Dallas)	0	1	1
(Hungary) Tibor Molnár (Dallas)	0	1	1

GA = Goals Against, GAA = Goals Against Average

Leading Goalkeepers	Minutes	GA	GAA
(England) Ken Cooper (Dallas)	60	1	0.50
(Brazil) Miguel de Lima (St. Louis)	60	2	1.00
unknown (Rochester)	60	4	2.00
(United States) Manford Elcer (Washington)	60	5	2.50

== Legacy ==
While 1971 marked the NASL's first foray into indoor soccer, it was by no means its last. In 1973 the Atlanta Apollos hosted two matches at The Omni against Montreal and Dallas respectively. In February 1974 the famed Soviet Red Army squad embarked on a three-city tour (Toronto, Philadelphia, St. Louis) against NASL competition. It was the second of those three matches, played on February 11 that caught everybody's attention. The Philadelphia Atoms lost a close match to the Soviets before 11,790 screaming fans at the Spectrum. That night is often cited as the watershed moment of indoor soccer in the United States. With over 35,000 fans attending the three Russian matches, the NASL began to recognize the sport's potential. Larger indoor tournaments were staged in 1975 and 1976, as well as more independently staged matches. All of this ultimately led to full NASL indoor seasons beginning in 1979–80.

By no small coincidence, the future co-founder of the Major Indoor Soccer League, Ed Tepper, was also in attendance at the Spectrum that night in 1974. Liking what he saw, Tepper later shared a videotape of a 1977 indoor match with former Washington Whips owner, Earl Foreman. Foreman also saw the game's potential, and the two men set about forming a new indoor-only soccer league. The MISL began play in 1978, and lasted until 1992.

Other national indoor leagues that followed included the Continental Indoor Soccer League, the American Indoor Soccer Association, (MISL II and MISL III), as well as the current Major Arena Soccer League. In 2008 the Federación Internacional de Fútbol Rápido, or FIFRA, was formed as the sport's international governing body. FIFRA was effectively replaced in 2013 by the World Minifootball Federation.
