= Dick Howard (soccer) =

Former soccer player (born 1943)

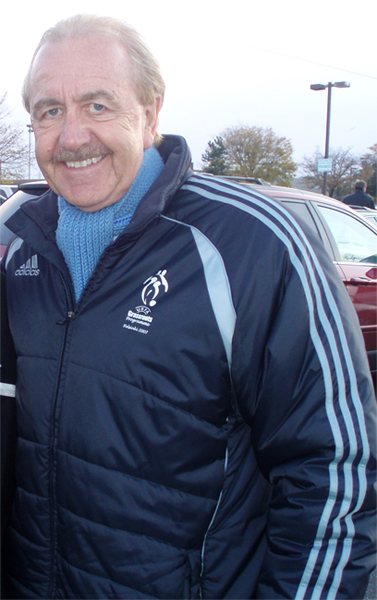
- Howard in 2008
- Born: Richard James Howard; 10 June 1943 (age 83); Bromborough, Cheshire, England
- Education: Chester College of Education; State University of New York at Brockport
Association football career
- Position: Goalkeeper
Senior career*
Years	Team	Apps	(Gls)
1965–1966	Chester	1	(0)
1967	Hamilton Primos		
1967	Rochester Lancers		(0)
1968	Detroit Cougars	6	(0)
1969–1971	Rochester Lancers		(0)
1971–1974	Toronto Metros	47	(0)
International career
1972–1973	Canada	5	(0)
Howard's voice
Recorded 2 October 2007
at a Canadian Soccer League match
- * Club domestic league appearances and goals

Richard James Howard (born 10 June 1943) is a retired professional soccer player who played as a goalkeeper. He moved to Canada from England in 1967 and went on to appear for Canada internationally.

After retiring from playing in 1974, he became an educator, long-time FIFA coaching instructor, coach, author, and a print and broadcast journalist on soccer in Canada and abroad. Howard was inducted into the Canadian Soccer Hall of Fame in 2002.

== Playing career ==
Howard made one appearance for Chester in the English Football League Fourth Division during 1965–66. During this time, he received a diploma in physical education from the Chester College of Education in 1965. He moved to Canada and played for the Hamilton Primos of the National Soccer League in 1967, making it to the championship finals before losing to Windsor Teutonia. Later that year he played several matches for the Rochester Lancers in the American Soccer League before playing in the inaugural season of the North American Soccer League for the Detroit Cougars in 1968. When the team folded at the end of that season he returned to Rochester which were now playing in the American Soccer League by that time.

The Lancers joined the NASL in 1970 where he was a member of the team that won the championship that year. Howard graduated from the nearby State University of New York at Brockport with a degree in physical education. He was acquired from the Lancers by the Toronto Metros in 1971 and played in Toronto through the 1974 season. He was also a member of the Canadian national team during 1974 FIFA World Cup qualification. In 1977, he was named to the Rochester Lancers Team of the Decade.

== Post-playing career ==
From 1972 to 1986 he was director of athletics and head of physical education at Crescent School, a prominent private school in Toronto. During this time he served on the coaching staff of Canadian national youth teams and in 1981 was assistant coach of the World Cup team for 1982 FIFA World Cup qualification, as the team came within one goal of qualifying for the 1982 World Cup. Howard was appointed technical director of the Canadian Soccer Association from 1986 to 1992 and also served as Canada's first National Goalkeeping Coach. He attained a unique treble in 1986 as the first person in Canadian soccer history to have played, managed and coached in the national program. In 1987, he was appointed by FIFA to conduct a coaching course in Kuwait and since that time has conducted more than 100 FIFA courses and projects around the world as the longest-serving FIFA coaching instructor in North America. In addition Howard was a member of the FIFA Technical and Development Committee from 1998 until 2012 and served as Chairman of the CONCACAF Coaching Committee from 2001 until 2012.

An author of two books on the game "Shutouts and Saves", a goalkeeping manual, and "Soccer - Diving headers, selling a dummy, and everything else about the game" with noted artist Ben Wicks. This in addition to producing numerous coaching manuals and video tapes for the Canadian Soccer Association, CONCACAF and FIFA. He also wrote a weekly soccer column for the Toronto Sun newspaper from 1994 to 1998.

Howard has had an extensive career as a soccer media analyst. It all began in the 1980s when Howard and Mike Povey were hired as hosts for the popular series "Road to Wembley" on CFMT-TV. He also hosted and produced "The CSA Report" which featured the Soccer 2000 series as well as the Classic Cup Final series on ESPN Classic Canada. Howard was the in-studio analyst for every World Cup from 1990 until 2010 and worked for CBC Radio Sports in Brazil 2014. He was the on-location or in-studio analyst for EURO Finals from 1996 until 2008. In addition he has been a color commentator for over 200 games on CBC, CTV, ROGERS SPORTSNET, TSN, CFMT/OMNI, and the FOX SOCCER CHANNEL. He currently is the international reporter for the longest running radio show in North America "Soccer is a kick in the grass" on WYSL in Rochester New York and recently completed a five-year soccer project as Director of Soccer at Crescent School from 2009 to 2014.

Howard was inducted into the Canadian Soccer Hall of Fame in 2002 as a builder and the Rochester Lancers Wall of Fame in 2013.
