= Rochester Lancers (1967–1980) =

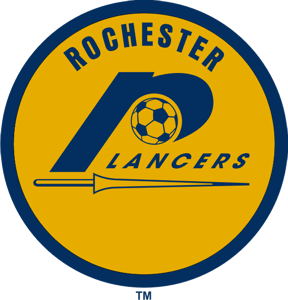
- Full name: Rochester Lancers
- Founded: 1967; 59 years ago
- Dissolved: 1980; 46 years ago
- Stadium: Holleder Memorial Stadium
- Owner: Charlie Schiano (majority)
- Chairman: Charlie Schiano
- League: ASL (1967–69); NASL (1970–80)
Home colors	Away colors

The Rochester Lancers were an American soccer team that competed in the American Soccer League (ASL) from 1967 until 1969, and in the North American Soccer League (NASL) from 1970 to 1980. The team was based in Rochester, New York, and played home games at Holleder Memorial Stadium. The Lancers won the 1970 NASL Championship and was the only NASL team to compete in the CONCACAF Champions' Cup. The Lancers could not sustain their early success, posting two winning records and a few playoff appearances before folding after the 1980 season.

== History ==
=== Founding and ASL years ===
On March 23, 1967, it was announced Rochester, New York, had been granted a franchise in the upcoming professional American Soccer League (ASL) season. A group of local businessmen headed by attorney Rudy LePore formed Rochester Soccer Club, Inc. Roman Kucil, who had played for the Hungarian-Americans of the Rochester District Soccer League, was employed as manager of the team, which was officially named Rochester Lancers. On May 30, the Lancers played their first game, an exhibition game against German team SC Concordia von 1907, losing 4–2. The team's next match was another exhibition against Chelsea F.C., an English Football League First Division team, on June 13, 1967. The Lancers lost the match 6–1. On July 21, 1967, it was confirmed the Lancers would participate in the ASL's first division and would open the season on 27 August at home against Boston Tigers, and the teams would also play an exhibition match two weeks earlier.

A few days before the season, Rochester Lancers replaced manager Kucil with George Baker and signed seven players including Scottish forward Ken Allison and Brazilian Nelson Bergamo, who had played for Santos FC. In early October, Baker was replaced by general manager Charlie Schiano as acting coach. Sal DeRosa was hired and coached the team for the last four games of the season. In mid November, goal keeper Dick Howard joined the team; he allowed only two goals in his first four games with the club. The Lancers played their scheduled season finale against Philadelphia Ukrainians, losing 2–1 on December 17, 1967; however, the Lancers' 15-October match against Newark Ukrainian Sitch was postponed due to a conflict with the ASL All-Star game being held at Yankee Stadium. Originally rescheduled to be played in December, the game was not played until April 28, 1968. The match ended in 2–2 draw, securing a fourth-place finish for the Lancers in its debut season with a record of six wins, two draws and seven losses. Bergamo, who signed a new contract with the club a week earlier, scored a goal in the contest, finishing the season with 15 and leading the league. For the season, the team reported losses close to $50,000.

In early March 1968, the Lancers named Italian Ricardo Musci, who had spent the previous ten years coaching in Venezuela, as the team's new coach. On May 22, 1968, the Lancers hosted 1967–68 English First Division champions Manchester City F.C., losing 4–0 in the exhibition match; Francis Lee scored all four of City's goals. The Lancers' next match on June 11 was another exhibition match, this time against 1967–68 Scottish Cup champions Dunfermline Athletic F.C., who defeated the Lancers 8–1 with Barrie Mitchell scoring a hat-trick and Robert Paton scoring two goals. On June 25, the Lancers hosted Borussia Dortmund; the city provided a motorcade for the German team and presented them with the key to the city. The Lancers lost their third-consecutive match against international competition 6–0. In August, the Lancers signed a working agreement with the Detroit Cougars of the North American Soccer League, resulting in several Cougar players including goal keeper Dick Howard playing for Rochester Lancers. On October 15, Ricardo Musci was fired as coach after the team had compiled a record of four wins, three losses and one draw in league play, with an additional five loses in exhibition matches.

General manager Charlie Schiano again became interim coach. On November 7, 1968, it was announced Andrej Nagy, former manager of Washington Whips and Detroit Cougars, would take over as head coach of the Lancers from 1 February 1969; goalkeeper Howard was hired as assistant coach and ran training with Schiano, managing the touchline for the remaining games of the season. On December 1 that year, the Lancers finished the season with a 10–0 away victory against Hartford Kings, ending the 1968 American Soccer League season in second place with a record of six wins, five losses and one draw.

Six weeks before the start of the 1969 season, Andrej Nagy resigned his position and was replaced by former Canada men's national soccer team assistant coach Frank Pike. By the middle of March, GM Schiano had begun to revise the roster, having already signed Tony Lecce, Charlie Williams and Jorge Piotti. The team traded or released fourteen players from the 1968 roster, and ten new players joined the 1969 squad. Other notable additions included John Kerr, who had played with the team during the 1967 season; Canadian international Ralph McPate; and former captain of the NASL Houston Stars Hungarian-born Tibor Vigh. After playing seven games, the team was in first place in the ASL Northern Division and compiling a record of two wins and five draws. The Lancers fired coach Pike and replaced him with Jimmy Koerner on an interim basis.

At the beginning of July 1969, the Lancers defeated the Canada men's national team 4–0 in exhibition match held in Lincoln, Ontario, and in mid August, the team hosted an all-star team of players from the National Soccer League of Canada, defeating the visitors 2–1 for their seventeenth-consecutive match without a defeat. After a dispute with GM Charles Schiano over training, Koerner resigned his coaching position and was replaced by Augie Thomas on October 1, 1969. The Lancers finished the 1969 American Soccer League season with a record of twelve wins, five draws and three losses, and tied for first place with Syracuse Scorpions. The Scorpions defeated the Lancers in a single-game playoff 3–1. The day before the playoff match, Bob DiLuca was named ASL Rookie of the Year and Charlie Mitchell was named an all-star for the second-consecutive season.

=== Promotion to the NASL and early success ===
At the conclusion of the 1968 North American Soccer League season, the league announced it would suspend play for three-year period, during which league management would run an all-star team supported by eight of the current teams. This United States Soccer Federation (USSFA) rejected this plan and the league's 1969 season opened with five teams. Throughout mid 1969, there were rumors the Lancers might join the NASL; Dallas Tornado and Kansas City Chiefs owner Lamar Hunt visited Rochester and met with Lancers management in August. After the conclusion of the 1969 American Soccer League and North American Soccer League seasons, it was announced the Lancers and Washington Darts would join the NASL for the following season. On January 7, 1970, the Lancers hired Alex Perolli as head coach for a salary of $25,000. A few weeks before the start of the season, the team re-signed veterans Charlie Mitchell, Davie Thomson, and their leading scorer the previous season Carlos Metidieri. Five days before the start of the season, GM Charlie Schiano announced his resignation but returned to the position a week later.

The Lancers defeated Dallas Tornado 2–1 in their first game in the NASL in Texas but lost their home opener against defending champions Kansas City Spurs. For the 1970 season, the NASL invited four international teams to play each American team; the results of the match would count in league standings. The Lancers lost the first two of these international matches to Hertha BSC by 3–1 on May 12, 1970, and lost 1–2 against Coventry City on 26 May 1970. On July 12, the Lancers played Israeli team Hapoel Petah Tikva F.C.; the match finished in a scoreless draw; and on July 29, the Lancers defeated Portuguese club Varzim S.C. 3–2. Due to a dispute between Perolli and team management, GM Schiano coached the team in their 5–1 victory over St. Louis Stars on June 14; it was the team's first victory in eight games. Perolli coached the team for its next game in Dallas, but resigned his position on July 1, and Sal DeRosa returned from Syracuse Scorpions to take over as head coach. DeRosa brought several Syracuse players including goalkeeper Claude Campos, attacking Midfielder Frank Odoi and defender Winston Earle to Rochester. The Lancers finished the 1970 North American Soccer League season in first place in the Northern Division, winning the division title in the last game of the season against Kansas City Spurs, with a record of nine wins, nine losses and six draws. Facing Washington Darts in the two-legged championship final, the Lancers won the first game in Rochester 3–0 on September 5 and lost the away leg in Washington DC 3–1 on 13 September for an aggregate score of 4–3, winning the championship. The next month, Carlos Metidieri was voted the league's Player of the Year.

During the off-season, Rochester added several players from the now-defunct Kansas City Spurs, including the leading scorer Manfred Seissler, and signed defender Adolfo Gori from Juventus FC On 19 March 1971, the Lancers participated in the NASL's 1971 Hoc-Soc Tournament, the league's first foray into indoor soccer, which was hosted by St. Louis Stars. The Lancers played two games in the tournament and defeated Washington Darts 3–1 but lost to the Dallas Tornado 3–0. Due to new laws concerning tax exempt organizations, the Lancers were forced to play their first two home games at Silver Stadium, home of minor-league baseball team Rochester Red Wings, and there were rumors the Lancers might move to Miami if they if could not find a suitable stadium. Before the team's first international match of the season, however, an arrangement was made for the team to continue to use Aquinas Memorial Stadium.

For the 1971 season, the league again arranged for each team to host four international clubs and for the matches to count in league standings. Scottish club Heart of Midlothian F.C. was the first team to make the trip; they played the Lancers on May 26, ending in a 0–0 draw. On June 18, the Lancers defeated Italian team L.R. Vicenza 3–2 with Metidieri scoring three goals. The following month, the Lancers defeated Greek team Apollon Smyrnis F.C. 4–0 for their seventh-consecutive victory, equaling the NASL record. In August, the Lancers secured first place in the Northern Division with a 0–0 draw against Brazilian side Bangu Atlético Clube, the Lancers' last international opponent of the season. The Lancers finished the 1971 North American Soccer League season with a record of thirteen wins, six draws and five losses—the best record in the league and also leading the league in attendance with an average of 5,871 fans per game.

On September 1, 1971, the Lancers hosted Dallas Tornado in Rochester for the first game of a best-of-three semifinal series. The game ended with a 2–1 victory for Rochester after ninety minutes of regulation and six fifteen-minute overtime periods, totaling 176 minutes of play, setting the record for the longest game in league history. The Tornado evened the series with a 3–1 win in Dallas, before winning the series on September 8 by defeating the Lancers 2–1 in Rochester after 148 minutes of play, ninety minutes of regulation and four overtime periods. The day before the team was eliminated from the playoffs, league-leading scorer Carlos Metidieri was voted league MVP for the second consecutive season.

=== 1971 CONCACAF Champions' Cup ===
By winning the 1970 NASL Championship the Lancers qualified to participate in the 1971 CONCACAF Champions' Cup; they were the only NASL team to compete in the competition and the first appearance by a US professional team. In the first round of the North American Zone qualifying stage, the Lancers were drawn to play the Bermudian Premier Division champions Pembroke Hamilton in a two-legged series. The first leg was played on September 19, 1971, in Rochester, New York, with the Lancers winning 4–1. At the end of regulation in the return leg in Bermuda, Pembroke had a 3–0 lead, resulting in a 4–4 aggregate score over both legs. With two minutes left in the second overtime, Manfred Seissler scored, resulting in a 5–4 Lancers victory for the series. The Lancers were set to play C.D. Guadalajara in the next round but in early October, the Mexican team informed Rochester it could not attend the scheduled match in New York. On November 29, CONCACAF awarded the Lancers the series victory due to forfeit because Guadalajara did not select a date for the match. The victory made the Lancers the first American soccer team to reach the finals of a CONCACAF tournament.

In March 1972, the Rochester Lancers were one of six teams to participate in a round-robin tournament hosted in Guatemala City. In their first match, over 42,000 people watched the Lancers defeat the Surinamese club S.V. Transvaal 2–0. In the second match on March 16, the Lancers faced Mexican Primera División side Cruz Azul—the tournament favorites and eventual winners—drawing 1–1. The team's 2–0 victory over Netherlands Antilles Championship winners SV Estrella put the Lancers in first place of the tournament standings after three match rounds. Four days later, the Lancers suffered their first defeat, losing 3–1 to home team Comunicaciones F.C. In their final match of the tournament, Rochester lost 1–0 to Costa Rican side Liga Deportiva Alajuelense. For the tournament, the Lancers earned five points with a record of two wins, one loss and two draws, finishing in fourth place. It was the best finish by a US club until LA Galaxy finished second in the 1997 CONCACAF Champions' Cup.

=== Decline to mediocrity ===
After the team's home win in the 1971 CONCACAF Champions' Cup against Pembroke Hamilton, head coach Sal DeRosa announced he had tendered his resignation with the club a month earlier but agreed to stay on for the NASL playoffs and first round of the CONCACAF tournament. In February 1972, Adolfo Gori was named player-coach for the 1972 season. During the off season, the Lancers signed new players Carlo Dell'Omodarme— who had played with Gori at Juventus—and Gary Barone, who was selected in the NASL college-player draft, while releasing more than twelve players from the previous year's roster. Rochester hosted one international opponent during the 1972 season, losing 3–1 to German team Werder Bremen on July 23, 1972. The Lancers finished the 1972 North American Soccer League season in second place in the Northern Division with a record of six wins, five losses and three ties, losing the division title to New York Cosmos in the teams' final meeting of the season.

The Lancers were eliminated from the playoffs the following week after a 2–0 loss to St. Louis Stars. Defender Peter Short was the only Rochester player named a first-team all-star for the season. Shortly after the season's end, GM Charles Schiano announced he would recommend against retaining Gori as head coach of the team, a move confirmed in mid-December. It was also revealed the team had not paid several players due to financial trouble, which the team attributed to the league cutting the number of games for the season from twenty-four to fourteen, and the NASL not having scheduled three promised international friendlies for each NASL Team. On December 15, 1972, it was reported approximately $10,000 was owed to players and that the team had not yet posted the league-required $75,000 performance bond.

==== New ownership ====
At the beginning of January 1973, it was announced a group of businessmen had purchased the franchise rights of the Lancers from the league, and would retain the name and assume all outstanding debts. General Manager Charles Schiano and team President Pat Dinolfo, who were part of the previous ownership group, were retained in advisory capacities. It was later revealed the previous ownership group had returned their franchise rights to the league, effectively folding the club. In the first week of March, after at least two other offers for the Lancer's open head-coaching position were rejected, the Lancers rehired Sal DeRosa as head coach. The next week, Peter Short signed a new contract with the team as a player and assistant coach. During the 1973 season, the Lancers hosted three international opponents but unlike earlier seasons, the games did not count towards the standings. Rochester Lancers defeated Irish club Finn Harps 1–0 on May 25 in the team's first win of the season. On 17 June 1973, the Lancers hosted Brazilian side Santos FC, which was led by their team captain Pelé, and the Lancers lost the match 2–1. Pelé, who had received the key to the city earlier in the day, scored on a penalty kick. The Lancers faced C.D. Veracruz, who were managed by former Rochester head coach Alex Perolli, on June 29, losing to the Mexican team 1–0, the Lancers fifth-consecutive game without a victory. The match against Veracruz was the only match against international opponents that counted in the league's final standings. The 1973 season was the last season in which games from non-league clubs counted in league standings.

A week after the team's game against Santos, it was reported the team lost $10,000 hosting the match and that FC Torpedo Moscow had declined an invitation to Rochester due to the reported field conditions. A survey of city residents also showed little interest in the Russian team. Along with the disagreements between the Lancers and the city authorities over the stadium, it was rumoredteam might need to consider moving from Rochester following the season. The Lancers finished the 1973 season in last place in the Northern Division with a record of four wins, six draws and nine losses, having scored a league-low seventeen goals. It was the first season in the team's NASL history no players were named to the first-team All-Star team. After the season, the board committed to investing more money into the club and announced the team would participate in an indoor soccer season set to begin in January 1974; however, no indoor season was held in 1974.

In January 1974, the Lancers announced DeRosa would switch positions and become the team's assistant general manager and that the club would hire Brockport State's Bill Hughes as head coach. During the off-season, the Lancers released, sold or traded eighteen players from the previous season's roster, including two-time league MVP Carlos Metidieri, who was traded to Toronto Metros, retired and then accepted a contract from Boston Minutemen; and defender and assistance coach Peter Short, who was sold to Dallas Tornado. During and the Lancers' home loss to Los Angeles Aztecs on June 11, fans threw rocks at the lineman after those in attendance thought an incorrect call by the official had led to a Lancers player being ejected from the game. On July 20, the Lancers' team was in first place in their division with a record of eight wins and seven losses; a disagreement between head coach Bill Hughes and general manager Jim Petrossi led to Hughes being left in Rochester and Petrossi sitting on the bench during the team's game in Boston that evening.

On July 20, 1974, Boston Minutemen defeated the Lancers 7–1, their worst loss of the season, allowing the Minuteman to take over first place in the division. A few days later, Romanian Ted Dumitru was introduced as the new head coach; Hughes was described as suspended without pay. Rochester Lancers did not win a match for the remainder of the season, finishing with a record of eight wins, ten losses and two draws, and were placed third in the Northern Division. A few days after the end of the season, the team announced Dumitru had been rehired as head coach. The next day, it was revealed although the Lancers announced attendances of 60,000 for the first eleven home games, the city stadium operators estimated only 15,768 tickets were sold for those games. GM Petrossi disagreed with the city's numbers; the club stated a few days later it sold over 74,000 tickets for the season but expected to lose about $40,000 for the season.

==== First Indoor tournament and worst season ====
In December 1974, it was announced Rochester Lancers would host one of the four 1975 NASL Indoor regional tournaments at the Community War Memorial. In mid-January 1975, New York Cosmos, Boston Minutemen and the Hartford, Connecticut, expansion team were named as the other teams that would compete in the Region 2 tournament to be held in early February. On February 6, New York Cosmos beat Hartford team 6–4 and the Boston Minutemen defeated Rochester Lancers 4–3. Two days later, the first-round winners played the losing teams. In the first match of the night, the team from Hartford defeated the Minutemen 5–3 and the Lancers defeated the Cosmos 8–7. With each team in the region having one win and one loss, the Cosmos were declared the winners of the group on goal difference. A week prior to the tournament, Lancers' ownership stated they expected hosting the tournament to cost approximately $50,000 and that they would need to sell 5,000 tickets for each night to break even. Attendance for the first round was only 2,191 and just 3,173 attended the second round.

In April 1975, before the season, the Lancers embarked on a 16-day tour through Italy, playing a series of friendlies against teams such as Casertana F.C., a team of players from S.S. Lazio and A.S. Roma, Ascoli F.C. and Formia Calcio. During the off-season, the Lancers added nine new players including Italian-Canadian rookie goalkeeper Ardo Perri. The Lancers' first home game of the season was postponed because the stadium's grass did not grow properly; it was estimated this would cost the team up to $6,000 to reprint tickets and programs. On June 27, 1975, the Lancers hosted New York Cosmos, who were led by Pelé, with 14,562 fans in attendance—a record for a home game. After nine games, the Lancers were in first place in the Northern division but finished the 1975 North American Soccer League season in fourth place with a record of six wins and sixteen losses, losing the last six games of the season.

The Lancers had struggled to score all season, having signed and released five strikers to pair with Tommy Ord by the end of June. In a shocking move, the team announced they were rebuilding for the next season and sold Ord to the Cosmos for $75,000. In late August 1975, it was revealed the Lancers had not yet posted their $100,000 performance bond with the league, the payment being due on 10 September. Club vice president and general manager John Petrossi stated it was the league rather than the Lancers that had defaulted on certain conditions and repeated a threat to move the team to Buffalo. On September 29, however, Petrossi announced he was taking a less-active role in the team and named Sal DeRosa general manager of the team. It was also announced the team board had voted to pay a performance bond of $150,000 for the 1976 season. On October 20 that year, Ted Dumitru resigned as head coach. A little over a month later, the team sold Charlie Mitchell, the last player on the roster who was a member of the original Lancers when they joined the NASL, to Washington Diplomats.

=== Popović era ===
==== Return to playoffs ====
In mid December 1975, Dragan 'Don' Popović was introduced as the Lancer's head coach, the 15th in the team's 10-year history. In January, the team president Pat Dinolfo announced a substantial increase in funding to the team boosting the payroll to over $100,000. The team's total budget for the 1976 season was $230,000, the lowest in the league. To break even for the season, Dinolfo stated, the team would need to draw between 7,000 and 8,000 fans per home game. The team's first competitive action under Popović were the Midwest Regionals of the 1976 NASL Indoor tournament held in Chicago March 13 and March 14. The Lancers won the region, defeating the Chicago Sting 5–2 on the first night and St. Louis Stars 5–4 the following evening, to advance to the finals in St. Petersburg, Florida. In the first match of the tournament Final Four, the Lancers defeated the San Jose Earthquakes 6–4 in an upset over the defending indoor league champions. The Lancers suffered multiple injuries in the match including starting goalkeeper Jim May and forward Frank Odoi. The team lost the next match 6–4 to the Tampa Bay Rowdies coming in second in the tournament. In mid April, the team announced that it was reorganizing its ownership structure to seek new investors and confirmed the team had lost money the previous three seasons, with losses for the 1975 season estimated to be between $80,000 and $90,000.

Only two players who had started the 1975 season remained with the team for the 1976 season. During the offseason the team added Mike Stojanović, Jim Pollihan, Craig Reynolds, as well as six Portuguese players. The Lancers hosted a single friendly during the season, losing to Roma of Italy 1–0 in late June 1976. Lancers management raised the ticket prices from $3.50 to $5.00 for the 23 July home match against the New York Cosmos with that Cosmos stars Pelé and Giorgio Chinaglia would attract larger demand for tickets. With Pelé out with a groin injury and Chinaglia held to one goal, the Lancers defeated the Cosmos 2–1 for Rochester's sixth straight home victory. The Lancers would go on to win their next six games, securing a playoff berth with a 3–0 victory over the Boston Minutemen. The team finished the 1976 North American Soccer League season with a loss to the Toronto Metros-Croatia, finishing in third place of the Atlantic Conference Northern Division with a record of thirteen wins and eleven losses. They were defeated by Toronto 2–1 in the first round of the playoffs on a last-second goal by Gene Strenicer.

==== Ownership changes and 1977 season ====
After the season, it was reported that the Lancers had lost money every year since their founding in 1967, with a ten-year deficit estimated to be around $745,000. It was also reported the team would be late in depositing its performance bond with the league for the second-consecutive year. The bond was deposited with the league on November 12, 1976, after the team has received three extensions to the deadline. The same month, it was revealed a group from Buffalo had offered $450,000 to purchase the club and had given the Lancer's board a check for $50,000 as a down-payment. The offer was rejected after disagreements between the Lancer's board members. A few weeks later, majority owner John Petrossi died, causing a further split among the remaining owners. Ownership group members Ralph DeStephano and Ray LeChase reopened negotiations with the interested parties from Buffalo while Charles Schiano and Pat Dinolfo—members of the original ownership group who founded the club in 1967—worked to keep the team in Rochester. In January 1976, Schiano and Dinoflo acquired a 60% controlling interest in the team by agreeing to assume the outstanding debts of the other owners. The team's debts were reported to be between $180,000 and $200,000. If the Dinolof/Schiano ownership group were to default on the outstanding debt, DeStaphano and LeChase could reclaim the franchise. A week later, the team announced Don Popović would return as head coach, becoming the first coach in team history to begin two consecutive seasons, and that the team would have an expected budget of $300,000 to $350,000.

For the upcoming season, the core of the previous year's playoff team remained with team leading scorer Mike Stojanović resigning, Jim Pollihan named captain, and Francisco Escos anchoring the midfield. The team drafted Don Droege during the NASL college draft, signed German-born Goalkeeper Jack Brand, who had represented Canada during the 1976 Summer Olympics, and Messias Timula was brought over on loan from S.L. Benfica. The Lancers again only hosted one international opponent during the summer, playing Italian team S.S. Lazio to a 0–0 draw on 3 June 1977. Popovic was suspended for two games and find $500 by the league after he had an altercation with referee Bob Matthewson after the Lancers lost to the Chicago Sting. The Lancers tied the league record for most road losses in a row losing fourteen before defeating the San Jose Earthquakes 3–1 on 11 June 1977. A week later, the team lost to the Portland Timbers 3–2 at home in overtime, it was the Lancers' first loss at Holleder Memorial Stadium since 11 June 1976, a span of fourteen games.

In July, after a referee refused to continue a game at Holleder Stadium unless he was guaranteed protection after fans had tried to attack, it was reported that the league hand picked match officials that could deal with the intimidation from the Rochester fans. The Lancers set a regular season attendance record on 15 July 1977, when they hosted Pelé and Giorgio Chinaglia and the New York Cosmos. A crowd of 17,572 watched Rochester defeat the Cosmos 1–0 in a shootout. The Lancers finished the 1977 North American Soccer League season in third place of the Northern Division of the Atlantic Conference with eleven wins and fifteen losses, including a 1–12 road record for the season. Despite having a losing record, the Lancers qualified for the post season playoffs and only lost the division title and home field advantage in the playoffs by losing the last game of the regular season against the Toronto Metros-Croatia. Rochester defeated the St. Louis Stars 1–0 in a shootout in St. Louis in the single-game first round. Facing Toronto in the Division Championships, Rochester won the home leg 1–0 in another shootout on 13 August 1977, and then defeated the Metros in Toronto 1–0 in regulation time to advance to the Conference Championships. Facing the Cosmos, the Lancers lost both legs of the playoff series, losing the first match 1–2 at home with a record 20,005 fans in attendance, and 4–1 at Giants Stadium the next week.

==== Bigger budgets, little success ====
Despite losing $340,000 during the 1977 campaign, the following off-season, the team announced it expected to increase the overall budget for the upcoming season to $600,000. The budget was later increased to $850,000. It was also reported the ownership board had rejected two offers to purchase the team; one for $750,000 and one for $1 million. Don Popović was rehired as coach on a two-year contract. The Lancers re-signed Mike Stojanović in November 1977 and signed Hungarian Midfielder József Horváth in January 1978 to a contract the club described as the most expensive in its history. During the off-season, the Lancers signed nine new players, including Francisco Bolota—a veteran of the Primeira Liga, the top flight of Portuguese football—Horacio Palmieri and Hugo Nicolini. Also during the off-season, the organization established a booster club to help with fan outreach, redesigned the team's uniforms, hired a dance squad to perform at home games, and negotiated with the city for a new clock and scoreboard. A few days before the Lancers' first game of the 1978 season, Rochester was named the worst city and Holleder Memorial Stadium as the worst stadium to play in a poll of NASL players.

On 12 May 1978, seven members of the front-office staff resigned their positions after public relations director Jerry Epstein was fired, citing disagreement with board chairman Charlie Schiano. General manager Dick Kraft resigned a few days later, citing similar reasons and support for the other staff members. It was reported the team's executive board had voted to fire Kraft the previous December but Charles Schiano had retained Kraft against the board's wishes. On June 5, former Chicago Cardinals and Cleveland Browns defensive back Don Paul was named the team's new general manager. In May 1978, it was reported New York real-estate investor Bernie Rodin intended to purchase 20% of the Lancers ownership shares for $400,000. Rodin's investment was to be paid over three years. Later in the year, Rodin stated he was willing to increase his investment to $1 million during that time. The June 21 home game against Toronto Metros-Croatia resulted in violence after Vančo Balevski scored the winning goal for Toronto. Coach Popović tried to punch lineman Steve Szabo, feeling the Toronto side's midfielder was off-side; the fans tried to storm the field, and threw rocks and other objects at match officials. Two days later, the Lancers were notified they would be fined and that coach Popović would be suspended from the sidelines for the Lancers' remaining eight home matches. Popović would coach all but one of the remaining home games from the roof of the stadium's press box, using a walkie talkie to communicate with the bench. (Note: Woosnam lifted the suspension for the final home game of the Lancer's season which was Dragan Popović Appreciation Night.) The Lancers finished the 1978 North American Soccer League season in last place of the National Conference Eastern Division with 16 losses and 14 wins, one of which was awarded by forfeit against Tulsa Roughnecks, who used an ineligible player during the match on June 15, 1978. The lancers also missed the playoffs for the first time under Popović.

After the conclusion of the regular season, Bernie Rodin announced to the press general manager Don Paul would not be returning to the position, a decision team president Pat Dinolfo disputed. After originally announcing former Washington Redskins GM Mike Menchel had been hired, Menchel decided not take the job and public relations director Harry Abraham assumed the position. On 22 October 1978, Don Popović resigned his position as head coach to take the same job at the New York Arrows in the newly founded Major Indoor Soccer League. Charlie Schiano stated the team expected Popović to return to coach the outdoor season and it was reported the resignation was a way to sidestep competition rules. The Arrows were owned by John Luciani, a business partner of Lancer's co-owner Bernie Rodin, and the organizations planned to loan and sell players between the teams. The Arrows, whose roster included several Lancers players, and new signings Slaviša Žungul and Shep Messing, would win the 1978–79 Major Indoor Soccer League Championship.

==== 1979 season ====
During the offseason, the Lancers sold midfielder József Horváth for $70,000 and defender Don Droege $60,000; both to Washington Diplomats. In what was considered a coup for the club, goalkeeper Shep Messing, who was the highest-paid American soccer player the previous season with Oakland Stompers, signed with the Lancers. The team also signed Fred Grgurev who between 1973 and 1976 had earned fourteen caps with the United States men's national soccer team. Several players who won the MISL championship with New York Arrows, including Luis Alberto, Branko Šegota, Jim McLoughlin, Enzo Di Pede and Damir Šutevski, joined the Lancers. In late November, Popovic confirmed he would return to coach the 1979 season but announced it would be his last as coach of the Lancers. The Lancers opened the season on March 31, 1979, on the road against Philadelphia Fury, losing 3–0. The Arrows players had only a week between the MISL final and the Lancers' opening game.

On April 4, 1979, New York Arrows owner John Lucinai announced he was purchasing a 10% stake in the Lancers. A week later, Arrows GM Mike Menchel joined the Lancers as director of operations, having declined the Lancer's GM position the previous autumn. Due to several Lancers players honoring a short-lived players' strike, the Lancers were forced to sign eight replacement players, four of whom played in the team's 5–2 loss to Tulsa Roughnecks on April 14. The strike ended on April 18; it was the only game the Lancers played with replacement players. The Lancers' 1–0 victory over Washington Diplomats on April 22 was attended by 8,253 fans, the largest-ever crowd for a Lancer's home opener. The Lancers' largest regular-season attendance, with 18,881 fans, occurred on August 20, 1979, in a match against New York Cosmos. The 1979 season's home attendance average was 8,680, an increase of 28% over the previous season but below the 10,000-to-12,000 threshold the team's owners said they needed to make money. Throughout the season, there were rumors the team would move; Montreal was determined as the most-likely destination, and in early August, the organization stated for the Lancers to remain in Rochester, they needed to sell 6,000 season tickets for the next season. The Lancers finished the 1979 North American Soccer League season with a record of 15 wins and 15 losses, scoring 43 goals and winning seven of their last nine games, and missing the playoffs by one point, scoring 14–16 against Toronto Blizzard, who had scored 52 goals, earning 133 points for the season against Rochester's 132. (Note: During the 1979 season, teams earned six points for a win and one point for each regulation goal scored up to three per game.)

===== Fixing scandal =====
A few days after the conclusion of the 1979 season, goalkeeper Shep Messing was quoted in New York Post stating there was an attempt to fix the final score of the Lancer's August-11 match against the New England Tea Men, with each team giving the other a goal to allow both teams to qualify for the post-season playoffs. The Lancers were winning the match 2–0 when the offer was allegedly made. The game ended with the same score after a goal by Šegota was disallowed due to a Lancer foul in the penalty area. After several Lancers players denied any knowledge of the scheme, Mike Stojanović said Tea Men keeper Kevin Keelan had made the offer to him, and he was just forwarding the offer to Messing. Spokesman Vince Casey for the Tea Men denied the event occurred and the league announced it would investigate the matter. According to Tea Men GM Keating, Keelan said Stojanović had made the suggestion, which Keelan said he refused. During an interview with ABC television, Messing told Jim McKay he believed the suggestion was made in jest and nothing had been arranged. The incident was satirized in a Tank McNamara comic strip. In October 1979, it was predicted the investigation would continue into the next calendar year; NASL Commissioner Phil Woosnam was planning to question the players involved and the journalists who reported the incident. In June 1980, Woosnam announced the league investigation had determined no fixing has occurred but that Stojanović suggested to Messing the teams exchange goals, and that Messing should have immediately reported the incident. Both players were fined undisclosed sums.

=== Final season ===
Rumors of an imminent sale and move away from Rochester had persisted in mid 1979 and continued during the off-season. Lancers' management had been negotiating a sale with Molson Brewery that would move the team to Montreal for $3 million. In late September, however, it was announced the two sides had ended talks and that the Lancers would stay in Rochester. In late October 1979, it was reported John Luciani and Bernie Rodin, who between them owned 31% of the Lancers, were still planning to move the club to Montreal without selling the team. Rodin told media representatives in early November a decision for the team to move or remain in Rochester would be made by Thanksgiving, November 22. A spokesperson for the league told media inquirers it believed the matter had already been settled; Luciani had visited Montreal to scout the city as a potential location for the Lancers. One week after Thanksgiving, Luciani announced the decision would be made by the end of the year and that they were considering several cities. He confirmed he and Rodin wanted to move the team as soon as possible, and that a "southern city" was a likely choice on his list of potential destinations.

The next day, it was announced a fan-led group called Rochester Investors Sport Enterprises (RISE) had contacted the team owners offering to invest $1 million into the Lancers if the management team agreed to stay in Rochester. On December 10, 1979, Charlie Schiano said he expected the team to be sold for over $2 million to a group that included Molson, and a move to Montreal. Molson denied the report the following day but the company marketing director confirmed a member of the Lancer's ownership was expected to visit Montreal. On January 7, 1980, however, the Lancers' management team and Rochester Area Chamber of Commerce held a press conference announcing the Lancers would remain in Rochester for the 1980 NASL season. Team ownership expected with the indicated support from the Chamber of Commerce and average paid attendances of 12,000, the Lancers would break even with the projected $1.2 million budget.

Don Popović's contract as head coach of the Lancers expired at the end of the season; Popović confirmed in early January 1980 he would not return and had quit the team. Team ownership were publicly conflicted on whether they had wanted Popović to return. Several high-profile candidates were reported to be interested in the position; Kenny Cooper Sr. and Ron Newman were said to be leading candidates. After several months of speculation, Ray Klivecka, who had helped coach New York Cosmos to a 15–4 record and a semifinal appearance after Eddie Firmani was fired eleven games into the 1979 season, was hired as head coach on March 11, 1980. Klivecka was also given the post of general business manager. Executive vice-president and co-owner Bernie Rodin announced at the end of February Shep Messing would not be returning to play for the Lancers and would be replaced by Enzo Di Pede, who the previous season had served as Messing's backup and also played for New York Arrows. Several other Lancers players also left the team; 1979 NASL Defender of the Year Nick Mijatovic was sold to Washington Diplomats, and veteran defenders Miralem Fazlić and Nelson Cupello were released. The Lancer's all-time-leading scorer Mike Stojanović resigned for the 1980 season and the team added midfielders Dušan Lukić and Gene Strenicer shortly before the season.

The Lancers opened the 1980 season with a 2–0 loss on the road to Fort Lauderdale Strikers on April 12, 1980. They respectfully lost the next two games against the Toronto Blizzard and Tampa Bay Rowdies. The Lancers' first victory of the season came on their May 4 home-opener against Philadelphia Fury in front of a club-record home-opening attendance of 8,489. On May 22, with the Lancers having lost 3–4 and in last place of the National Conference Eastern Division, head coach Ray Klivecka was fired. The Lancers rehired Alex Perolli, who had coached the team for the first part of the 1970 NASL season and had been fired after a dispute with owner and general manager Charlie Schiano. In nineteen games, the Lancers compiled a record of 10 wins and 9 losses but the team won only two more matches for the rest of the season, ending the 1980 North American Soccer League season with a record of 12 wins and 20 losses and allowing 31 goals in the last 11 games.

==== Ownership feud, front-office turmoil ====
Results on the field were frequently overshadowed by a feud between the two factions of Lancers' owners; Rochester-based Charlie Schiano, Pat DiNolfo and Nuri Sabuncu, each of whom owned 22% of the team; and New York City-based Bernie Rodin and John Luciani, who owned 22% and 10% of the team, respectively. The split between the owners began when Rodin and Luciani sold Nick Mijatovic to Washington Diplomats without the consent of the Rochester co-owners. At the Lancer's kickoff dinner a few days before the team's home opener with over 800 fans in attendance, team vice president Sabuncu announced Rodin and Luciani had given the Rochester group until June 1 to buy them out or sell them their shares. Shortly after the start of the season, Rodin and Luciani sued the Rochester ownership group for $640,000 to recover loans made to the team. Head coach Ray Klivecka was fired on May 22, 1980; in part because the Rochester owners felt Klivecka was too loyal to the New York City faction. The following day, the Lancer's director of operations Mike Menchel resigned his position in protest over Klivacka's dismissal. The court hearing about the suit brought by Rodin and Luciani was delayed twice, and in late July, the two sides settled their ownership dispute with an agreement one side would buy the other's shares in the team or sell to a third party by October 1 that year. Prior to the settlement, Klivecka told the press he expected the New York faction to gain control of the team and that he would return to coach the squad.

The Lancers experienced financial problems throughout the 1980 season. In late May, it was reported the city courts had given authority to the landlord of the building housing the team's offices to evict them due to non-payment of rent, and that Rodin and Luciani were no longer providing any funding to the team. The Rochester owners announced they were seeking new investors and their intention to meet all outstanding obligations. On June 10, it was reported the players considered boycotting the upcoming match against New York Cosmos because at least 19 players had not been paid for two weeks. Later that month, it was revealed the Internal Revenue Service (IRS) had filed a lien for more than $53,000 in unpaid taxes against the team. By July 7, the Lancers had paid the IRS and outstanding debts to BlueCross BlueShield. The week earlier, however, Rochester Gas and Electric had turned off power to Holleder Memorial Stadium for two days due to nonpayment. On July 4, it was reported GM Harry Abraham had been given a week to "cool off" after getting into an argument with one of the Rochester owners.

Two weeks later, Abraham announced he had been terminated for attending a meeting with the District Attorney's office to report $44,000 in bad checks Lancers' management had written. Abraham said he had personally covered over $6,000 in expenses for the team, and that both former director of operations Mike Menchel and coach Klivecka also charged team expenses to their personal credit cards. Abraham also said the team owed private companies over $200,000. Lancers' VP Nuri Sabuncu acknowledged checks the team had issued were not honored but stated this occurred because the team's bank account was frozen when the IRS placed a lien on the team earlier in the month. According to Sabuncu, the team did not owe Abraham any money, and the team paid his outstanding wages. Sabuncu said the team owed money, as do all businesses, but stated Abraham was bitter and did not like the Lancers. The District Attorney reported Abraham did not attend a meeting and had not returned his office's calls, and that no evidence was presented to his office.

=== Demise ===
Just before the final home game of the season against Atlanta Chiefs, Bernie Rodin stated if the Rochester-based owners sold their shares to him and John Luciani for $1.9 million, the team would remain in the city. A week after the end of the season, the majority of the front office staff were sent on vacation for at least two and a half weeks. In September 1980, it was reported the Rochester group had agreed to sell their shares in the club to Rodin and Luciani, who would then add new investors. Later that month, the Lancers were evicted from their offices. Although the owners had agreed to complete a deal by October 1, no deal had been reached by the middle of the month, and it was suggested the current ownership group might return for the next season. The next day, it was reported the deal was being restructured and later that month, team vice president Sabuncu and a league spokesperson confirmed the Lancers would be participating in the 1981 season, despite the team not having yet posted its performance bond with the league. The following month, the NASL announced the Lancers had "voluntarily terminated" the franchise by not paying the required performance bond and because of debts including over $100,000 to players, and $200,000 to the league and its teams. The previous week, however, Western Enterprises, a group of former Lancer owners who claimed to still have franchise rights, had filed for and received a restraining order from the New York Supreme Court barring the league from terminating the team. On December 1, 1980, the NASL board of directors allowed the Lancers' an additional week to raise funds to posts the team's performance bond.

The next week, the league reported the Lancers, along with Washington and Houston, had not met the extended deadline. Two days later, the New York Supreme Court extended the order barring the league from terminating the team. On December 15, the Lancers participated in the league's draft, selecting three players. The next week, after the NASL was able to get the original restraining order lifted, the Rochester owners secured another injunction against the league. On December 23, State Supreme Court Justice Patlow refused to impose any further injunctions against the league. The NASL announced it had already notified the remaining 21 teams in the league they were proceeding without Rochester and team lawyers announced they would continue their legal action against the league. In early January 1981, after the NASL had released a schedule that did not include Rochester, the league announced it would grant the Lancers a chance to go through an involuntary termination process, allowing team representatives to state their case before the league board. Charlie Schiano and Pat Diniofro flew to Chicago to attend the league meetings but neither attended the hearing, which resulted in the league affirming Rochester Lancers were no longer part of the NASL. Two weeks later, a different State Supreme Court justice dismissed the Lancers' suit against the NASL on a technicality; a lawyer representing the owners promised to refile it. In late February, it was reported Pat Dinolfo had made a presentation to the league for reinstatement with the aim of restarting play for the 1982 season, and was waiting for the NASL to reply. Dinolfo said the team would fight to protect the franchise's rights to players whom the league had declared free agents.

== Results by year ==
Year	Record (W-L-D)	Regular season finish	Playoffs	Avg. Attend.
American Soccer League
1967–68	6–7–2	4th, First Division, ASL	Did not qualify	
1968	6–5–1	2nd, First Division, ASL	Runners-up	
1969	12–3–5	1st (tie), Northern Division, ASL	Northern Division Playoff	
North American Soccer League
1970	9–9–6	1st, Northern Division	NASL Champions	4,506
1971	13–5–6	1st, Northern Division	Semifinals	5,871
1972	6–5–3	2nd, Northern Division	Semifinals	5,505
1973	4–9–6	3rd, Northern Division	Did not qualify	4,069
1974	8–10–2	3rd, Northern Division	Did not qualify	5,908
1975	6–16	4th, Northern Division	Did not qualify	5,333
1976	13–11	3rd, Northern Division, Atlantic Conference	First round	5,159
1977	11–15	3rd, Northern Division, Atlantic Conference	Division Championships	6,065
1978	14–16	4th, Eastern Division, National Conference	Did not qualify	6,758
1979	15–15	4th, Eastern Division, National Conference	Did not qualify	8,680
1980	12–20	4th, Eastern Division, National Conference	Did not qualify	7,757

=== NASL indoor soccer ===
On March 19, 1971, the league staged its first indoor event, a four-team Hoc-Soc tournament at the St. Louis Arena. Rochester won its first match 3–1 before falling to the Dallas Tornado 3–0 in the final. In late 1975, the NASL ran a two-tiered, 16 team, indoor tournament with four regional winners meeting in a "final-four" style championship. Despite hosting their region at Rochester War Memorial Arena, the Lancers did not progress out of the group. In March, they played an additional match, losing to Toronto Metros-Croatia 10–7 at home. In 1976, the Lancers advanced to the finals before being beaten 6–4 by the host Tampa Bay Rowdies at Bayfront Center. The NASL sanctioned a full indoor season in 1979–80 but the Lancers did not participate.

Year	Record	Regular season finish	Playoffs
1971	1–1	Hoc-soc tournament	Runners-up
1975	1–2	(two-tiered, 16 team tournament)	group stage
1976	3–1	(two-tiered, 12 team tournament)	Runners-up

== Honors ==
NASL championships (1)
- 1970

NASL Regular Season Titles (1)

- 1971

NASL Championships indoor

- 1971 runner-up
- 1976 runner-up

ASL championships

- 1968 runner-up

NASL Governor's Cup

- 1971

CONCACAF Champions Cup

- 1971: Fourth place

Division titles

- 1969 Northern Division (ASL)
- 1970 Northern Division
- 1971 Northern Division

NASL Most Valuable Player

- 1970 Carlos Metidieri
- 1971 Carlos Metidieri

NASL Scoring Champion

- 1970 Carlos Metidieri (14 goals, 7 assists, 35 points)
- 1971 Carlos Metidieri (19 goals, 8 assists, 46 points)

NASL Goal Scoring Champion

- 1971 Carlos Metidieri (19 goals)

All-Star first team selections

- 1970 Carlos Metidieri, Charlie Mitchell
- 1971 Carlos Metidieri, Manfred Seissler, Peter Short
- 1972 Peter Short

All-Star second team selections

- 1970 Bob DeLuca
- 1971 Francisco Escos, Charlie Mitchell
- 1972 Francisco Escos, Carlos Metidieri
- 1973 Francisco Escos
- 1975 Charlie Mitchell, Tommy Ord
- 1977 Mike Stojanovic

All-Star honorable mentions

- 1971 Claude Campos, Roberto Lonardo
- 1972 Adolfo Gori, Charlie Mitchell
- 1974 Charlie Mitchell
- 1978 Joszef Horvath

Indoor All-Stars

- 1971 Manfred Seissler, Peter Short
- 1976 Jim May, Joao Pedro

Canadian Soccer Hall of Fame

- 2002 Dick Howard, Branko Šegota
- 2008 Jack Brand
- 2009 Mike Stojanović

Indoor Soccer Hall of Fame

- 2012 Don Popović, Branko Šegota
- 2019 Shep Messing

== Other achievements ==
- Participations in CONCACAF Champions' Cup: 1971

== Head coaches ==
- Roman Kucil 1967
- Tony Pullano 1967
- George Baker 1967
- Charles Schiano 1967
- Sal DeRosa 1967
- Ricardo Musci 1968
- Charles Schiano 1968
- Andrej Prean Nagy 1969 (accepted job but left to coach in Mexico)
- Frank Pike (soccer)1969
- Jim Koerner 1969
- Auggie Thomas 1969
- Alex Perolli 1970, 1980
- Charles Schiano 1970
- Sal DeRosa 1970–1971, 1973
- Adolfo Gori 1972
- Bill Hughes 1974
- John Petrossi 1974
- Ted Dumitru 1974–1975
- Dragan Popovic 1976–1979
- Ray Klivecka 1980

== Team executives ==
- Charlie Schiano: Majority Owner and chairman of the Board
- Pat DiNolfo: President and Co-owner
- Nuri Sabuncu: Executive Vice President and Co-owner
- Tony Pullano: Treasurer and Co-owner
- Harold Tausch: Co-owner
