= New York Express =

The New York Express was a soccer team based out of Uniondale, New York that played in the Major Indoor Soccer League. They played only part of the 1986–87 MISL season before folding just after the league's midseason All-Star Break. Their home arena was Nassau Veterans Memorial Coliseum. They were owned by Stan Henry and ex-New York Cosmos goalie Shep Messing.

== Formation ==
The Express were formed in late 1985, and played an exhibition schedule in the winter of 1986. The Express featured Messing in goal and former Cosmos star and U.S. National Team player Rick Davis, as well as Iranian national team star Andranik Eskandarian. New York won all five games it played (all held at the Nassau Coliseum), against such competition as Arsenal and Red Star Belgrade as well as the Portuguese and Irish national teams, drawing about 6,000 fans per contest. Finally, on May 15, 1986, the Express were accepted as an expansion franchise by the MISL.

== 1986-87 season ==
Things did not go nearly as well for the club once they joined the MISL; in fact, it quickly turned into a disaster. Despite drawing a decent crowd of 10,577 for their home opener on November 21, 1986, attendance quickly dropped as New York lost their first ten games, costing coach Ray Klivecka his job on December 23. After three more defeats, the Express hired ex-Arrows coach Don Popovic, who led them to a their first-ever win on January 7, 1987, 6–4 over the Chicago Sting, in front of 3,106 on Long Island. New York would make it two in a row with a 7–4 victory over the Kansas City Comets two nights later at the Coliseum; however, another slump gave the Express a putrid 2–22 record at the All-Star break. (Defender Chris Whyte and midfielder Michael Collins were selected for the game, played at the Los Angeles Forum and won by the East over the West, 6–5, in overtime.)

On February 14, 1987, the Express got their third (and final) win of the season when Mark Liveric's goal gave New York a 6–5 overtime win over the Lazers in Los Angeles. (It was the Lazers' ninth straight loss en route to a 16–36 record, worst in the West.) The next day, in a game carried nationally on ESPN, the Express were actually leading the defending champion Sockers, 2–1, at halftime in San Diego (with Njego Pesa getting both New York tallies). However, a flurry of San Diego goals in the second half made the final score 6–2, dropping the Express' record to 3-23. It would be the last game the New York Express would ever play: two days later, on February 17, the club announced it was bankrupt. Messing blamed poor attendance (an average of 5,212 for 13 home games) and an inability to sell sufficient shares in a $5.2 million public stock offering. MISL commissioner Bill Kentling, unhappy to see its New York team fail so spectacularly, threatened to sue the Express for fraud and breach of contract. The 37-year-old Messing also retired as a player after the death of the Express.

== Legacy ==
The Express were the fourth and final attempt by the MISL to establish itself in the New York market, after previously failing with the New York Arrows (1978–1984), who also played at Nassau Coliseum, the New Jersey Rockets (1981–1982), and the post-NASL New York Cosmos (1984–1985).

== Former coaches ==
- (United States) Ray Klivecka
- (United States) Don Popovic
- (United States) Mark Steffens
