= Ray Klivecka =

Soccer coach (born 1941)

Personal information
- Full name: Rimantas Klivečka
- Date of birth: 22 April 1941 (age 85)
- Place of birth: Vilnius, Lithuania

Managerial career
- Years: Team
- 1979: New York Cosmos
- 1980: Rochester Lancers
- 1980–1981: Buffalo Stallions (indoor)
- 1984–1985: New York Cosmos (indoor)
- 1986–1987: New York Express (indoor)

Rimantas Klivečka (born 22 April 1941) known as Ray Klivecka in the United States is a former soccer player and coach. He is best known for managing the New York Cosmos.

== College career ==
Klivecka played for Long Island University from 1961 to 1963. He was a two-time All-American and ended his college career as LIU's all-time leading goal scorer with 55 goals. His 23 goals in the 1963 season led LIU to its first ever NCAA Tournament appearance. He was inducted into the LIU Hall of Fame in 2000.

== Coaching career ==
After serving as a United States youth team coach, Klivecka spent the 1978 and 1979 seasons as an assistant coach for the New York Cosmos under head coach Eddie Firmani. When Firmani was fired in 1979, Klivecka took over for the remainder of the Cosmos' North American Soccer League campaign. The Cosmos finished the season in first place with a 24–6 record, but Klivecka was dismissed after suffering a loss to the Vancouver Whitecaps in the semifinals.

From 1979-80, he was a co-owner of the then Major Indoor Soccer League expansion franchise, St. Louis Steamers.

In 1980, he was also head coach and general manager for seven matches of the NASL-Franchise Rochester Lancers, which quit after that season.

Klivecka took over as head coach of the Buffalo Stallions of Major Indoor Soccer League for the 1980 and 1981 seasons, compiling a 39–30 record and leading the club to the playoffs in both seasons.

Due in part to his success with Buffalo, in the early days of December 1984 Klivecka was re-hired as head coach of the New York Cosmos, now playing indoor soccer in the MISL, for the 1984 season, where he stayed until the bitter end in mid 1985. Later he ended up suing the cosmos for $100,000.

In 1986, he was a short-lived coach of the indoor expansion franchise New York Express. President and ex-Cosmos goalkeeper Shep Messing fired him after a 0–10 season start record.
