= Francisco Escos =

Argentine footballer and manager

Personal information
- Date of birth: 10 July 1942 (age 84)
- Place of birth: Argentina
- Position: Midfielder

Senior career*
Years	Team	Apps	(Gls)
1961–1962	Temperley		
1962–1966	Estudiantes		
1967–1968	Lister Rossel		
1969	Magallanes	22	(6)
1970	Estudiantes	5	(1)
1971–1978	Rochester Lancers	127	(12)
1979–1981	Buffalo Stallions (indoor)	37	(4)

Managerial career
- 1984: Buffalo Storm
- Rochester Rhinos (assistant)
- * Club domestic league appearances and goals

Francisco Escos is an Argentine football manager and former player who played as a midfielder.

== Career ==
Escos played in Argentina for Temperley and Estudiantes for five years, in the NASL between 1971 and 1978 for the Rochester Lancers and in the Major Indoor Soccer League for the Buffalo Stallions from 1979 to 1981. In 1977, he was named to the Rochester Lancers Team of the Decade.

In Chile, he tried with Universidad de Chile and Magallanes in 1967 before joining Lister Rossel in the Segunda División (1967–1968). In 1969, he played for Magallanes in the top division.

In 1984, Escos coached the Buffalo Storm of the United Soccer League. He later served as an assistant coach and the general manager of the Rochester Rhinos.
