= Dušan Lukić =

Serbian footballer (b. 1948)

Personal information
- Full name: Dušan Lukić
- Date of birth: 13 December 1948 (age 77)
- Place of birth: Belgrade, FPR Yugoslavia
- Height: 1.78 m (5 ft 10 in)
- Position: Midfielder

Youth career
- Mladenovac

Senior career*
| Years | Team | Apps | (Gls) |
| –1969 | Mladenovac | | |
| 1969–1978 | OFK Beograd | 206 | (29) |
| 1978 | San Jose Earthquakes | 20 | (3) |
| 1978 | Tulsa Roughnecks | 6 | (0) |
| 1979 | Philadelphia Fury | 29 | (6) |
| 1979–1980 | St. Louis Steamers (indoor) | 5 | (2) |
| 1980 | Rochester Lancers | 18 | (1) |
| 1980–1981 | Philadelphia Fever (indoor) | 12 | (2) |
- Sinđelić Beograd
| Total | | 296 | (43) |
- * Club domestic league appearances and goals

Dušan Lukić (Serbian Cyrillic: Душан Лукић; born 13 December 1948) is a Yugoslav retired footballer who played as a midfielder.

== Career ==
After starting out at Mladenovac, Lukić spent nine seasons with OFK Beograd between 1969 and 1978, making 206 appearances and scoring 29 goals in the Yugoslav First League.

In 1978, Lukić went to the United States and spent three seasons in the North American Soccer League. He also played indoor soccer in the Major Indoor Soccer League.
