= Gary Barone =

American soccer player

Personal information
- Place of birth: United States
- Position: Defender

Youth career
- SUNY Brockport

Senior career*
Years	Team	Apps	(Gls)
1972, 1974	Rochester Lancers	14	(0)

International career
1972	United States	1	(0)
- * Club domestic league appearances and goals

Gary Barone was an American soccer player who earned one cap with the U.S. national team. He also spent two seasons in the North American Soccer League.

Barone attended SUNY Brockport and was an All Conference soccer player in 1970 and 1971. He then went on to play with the Rochester Lancers in the North American Soccer League in 1972 and 1974. He was suspended and the waived by the Lancers due to an incident at a Rochester employment agency.

Barone earned one cap with the U.S. national team in a 2–2 tie with Canada on August 29, 1972, World Cup qualifier. Barone came on for Barry Barto.
