= Dave Thomson (footballer, born 1943) =

Scottish footballer

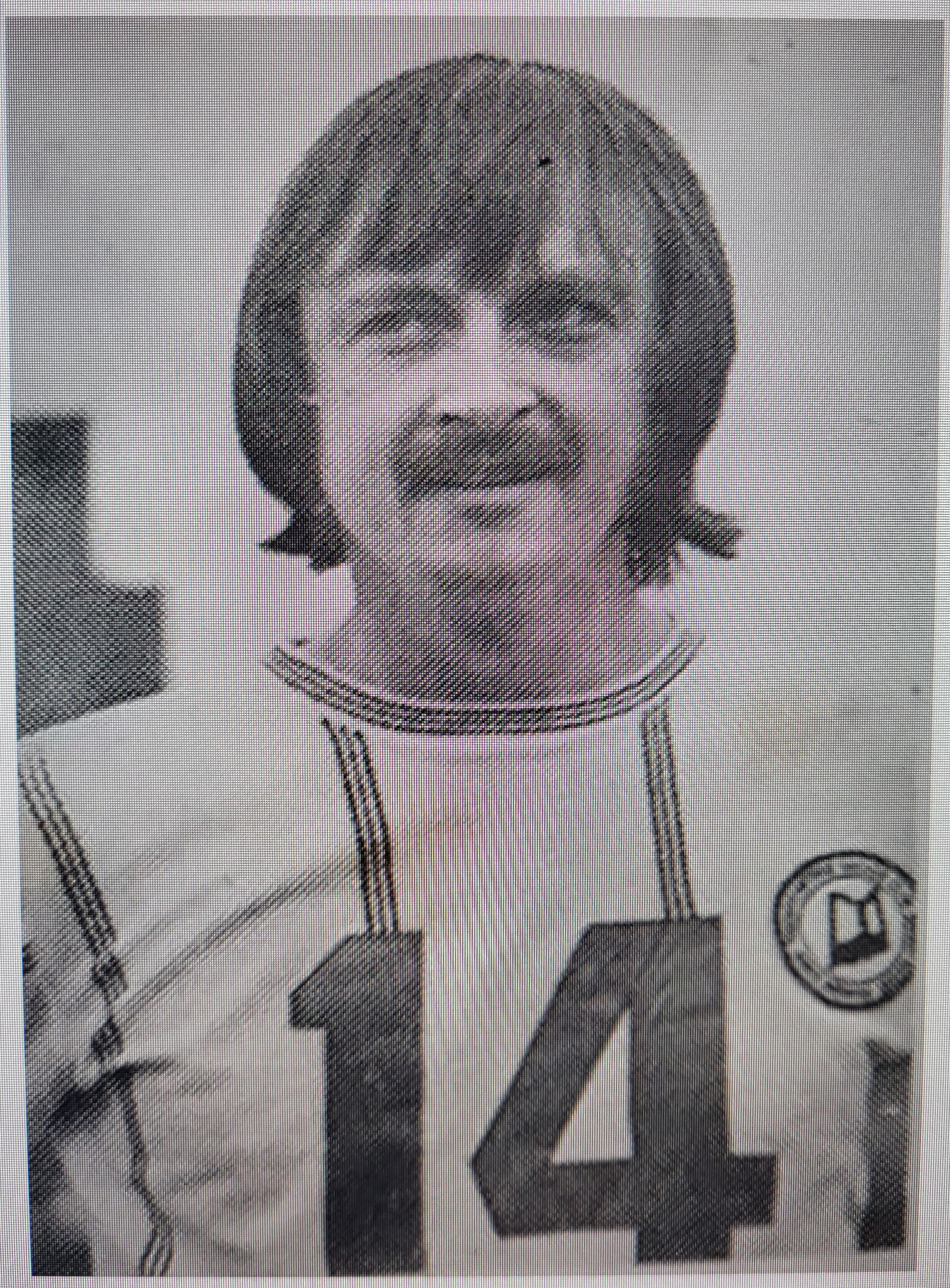
Davie Thomson Toronto Metros 1972
Personal information
- Full name: David Ferguson Thomson
- Date of birth: 14 February 1943
- Place of birth: Dumbarton, Scotland
- Date of death: May 2019 (aged 76)
- Positions: Midfielder; outside left

Youth career
- -1957: Drumchapel Amateur F.C.

Senior career*
Years	Team	Apps	(Gls)
1957–1963	Clyde	46	(10)
1968–1971	Rochester Lancers		
1971–1972	Toronto Metros	17	(0)
1973–1974	Toronto Hungaria		

International career
1956-1957	Scotland Schoolboys	2	(0)
1958–1959	Scotland Amateurs	3	(0)
- * Club domestic league appearances and goals

Davie Thomson (born 14 February 1943) was a Scottish former footballer who played as a midfielder.

== Youth career ==
Thomson played for the prodigious Drumchapel Amateur F.C. as a youth and was also selected to represent his country at School Boy level in the Victory Shield in 1956 and 1957.

== Career ==
Thomson began his career at Clyde and won 3 caps for the Scotland Amateur team. With various clubs vying for his signature, he eventually choose to sign for Clyde straight out of school in 1957 at 15 years old. As he was just 15, he was only able to sign on an amateur contract

He made his Clyde debut against Airdrieonians F.C. (1878) on 20 February 1960, in a 4-2 win at Broomfield Park. Going on to play a total of 4 times in the League in the 1959–60 Scottish Division One season. His first senior goal came again against Airdrie, scoring in a 2-0 win on 24 December 1960. He played 13 times that season in the 1960–61 Scottish Division One. With the season culminating in him helping Clyde share the Glasgow Charity Cup after a 1-1 draw with Celtic F.C. at Hampden Park.

Clyde would go on to win the 1961–62 Scottish Division Two League title, with Thomson playing 15 times that season in League and cup, scoring 6 goals. With Clyde returning to the Scottish First Division in season 1962-63. Thomson would play 12 times in League and cup scoring twice. His last game for Clyde being a 5-0 home loss against Kilmarnock F.C.

At some point around this time, Davie left Clyde to purse a career song writing and subsequently emigrating to Canada.

He played in the American Soccer League in 1968 with Rochester Lancers. He returned to play with Rochester for the 1969 season. In 1970, the Lancers joined the North American Soccer League, and Thomson continued playing with the team. The following season he was traded to Toronto Metros. In 1973, Toronto released him from his contract.

He would subsequently sign with Toronto Hungaria in the National Soccer League along with former Metros teammate John Fahy. In his debut season with Hungaria he assisted in securing the double (NSL Championship & NSL Cup). He re-signed with Toronto Hungaria for the 1974 season. In 1977, he was named to the Rochester Lancers Team of the Decade.
