= Gene Strenicer =

Canadian retired soccer player (born 1945)

Personal information
- Full name: Jeno Strenicer
- Date of birth: August 12, 1945 (age 81)
- Place of birth: Budapest, Hungary
- Positions: Midfielder; defender

Senior career*
Years	Team	Apps	(Gls)
1973–1974	Toronto Metros	37	(3)
1975–1977	Toronto Metros-Croatia	58	(0)
1978–1979	Chicago Sting	39	(4)
1979–1982	New York Arrows (indoor)	108	(16)
1980	Rochester Lancers	25	(2)
1982–1984	Phoenix Inferno (indoor)	83	(6)

International career
1977–1980	Canada	8	(0)
- * Club domestic league appearances and goals

Jeno "Gene" Strenicer (born August 12, 1945) is a Canadian retired soccer player who played professionally in the North American Soccer League and the Major Indoor Soccer League. He earned eight caps with the Canadian men's national soccer team between 1977 and 1980.

== Professional ==
Strenicer fled Hungary and settled in Toronto in the 1970s. In 1973, he joined the Toronto Metros of the North American Soccer League. The Metros merged with Toronto Croatia before the 1975 season and Strenicer player for the Toronto Metros-Croatia for three seasons. In 1978, he moved to the Chicago Sting and finished his outdoor career with the Rochester Lancers in 1980. He played indoor soccer with the MISL New York Arrows in 1982.

== National team ==
For Canada, Strenicer played five times in World Cup qualifying in 1977, and three more times in 1980.
