= Miralem Fazlić =

Bosnian-Herzegovinian footballer

Personal information
- Full name: Miralem Fazlić
- Date of birth: 10 June 1947 (age 79)
- Place of birth: Tuzla, FPR Yugoslavia
- Position: Defender

Senior career*
Years	Team	Apps	(Gls)
- Sloboda Tuzla
1974	Toronto Croatia		
1975–1976	Toronto Metros-Croatia	33	(0)
1976–1979	Rochester Lancers	77	(2)
Total		110	(2)
- * Club domestic league appearances and goals

Miralem Fazlić (born 10 June 1947) is a Bosnian retired professional footballer who played as a defender.

== Club career ==
Fazlić played in his home country for Sloboda Tuzla, and in the NASL between 1975 and 1979 for the Toronto Metros-Croatia and Rochester Lancers. In 1974, he played in the National Soccer League with Toronto Croatia. In 1977, he was named to the Rochester Lancers Team of the Decade.
