= Francisco Bolota =

Portuguese footballer

Personal information
- Full name: Francisco Estêvão Bolota
- Date of birth: April 20, 1946 (age 80)
- Place of birth: Alcochete, Portugal
- Position: Striker

Youth career
- 1964–1967: GD Alcochetense

Senior career*
| Years | Team | Apps | (Gls) |
| 1967–1970 | F.C. Barreirense | 3 | (0) |
| 1970–1971 | C.D. Montijo | | |
| 1971–1976 | União de Tomar | 109 | (29) |
| 1976–1977 | C.D. Montijo | 30 | (12) |
| 1977 | Toronto Italia | 15 | (27) |
| 1978 | Rochester Lancers | 28 | (12) |
| 1978–1979 | C.D. Montijo | | |
| 1979 | Toronto First Portuguese | | |
| 1979–1981 | Juventude Sport Clube | 51 | (22) |
| 1981–1982 | Lusitano G.C. | | |
| 1982–1984 | União de Tomar | 15 | (5) |
| 1984–1985 | C.D. Montijo | 5 | (0) |
| 1986 | Toronto First Portuguese | | |
- * Club domestic league appearances and goals

Francisco Bolota (born April 20, 1946) is a Portuguese former footballer who played as a forward.

== Career ==
Bolota joined the youth ranks of GD Alcochetense in 1964. In 1967, he played in the Primeira Divisão with F.C. Barreirense for two seasons. Later he joined C.D. Montijo and played in the Segunda Divisão Portuguesa. In 1971, he returned to the top flight with União de Tomar for five seasons, and returned to former team C.D. Montijo for the 1976–77 season. In 1977, he played abroad in the National Soccer League with Toronto Italia. In his debut season in Toronto he recorded 27 goals in 15 matches.

In 1978, he played in the North American Soccer League with Rochester Lancers. He played with Toronto First Portuguese for the 1979 NSL season. The following season he returned to former team Montijo in the Segunda Divisão Portuguesa. He later had a stint with Juventude Sport Clube, and Lusitano G.C. He concluded his career in Portugal with former teams União de Tomar, and Montijo. In 1986, he returned to play in the National Soccer League with Toronto First Portuguese.

In 1985, he permanently settled in Canada and found employment as a construction worker.
