= Frank Donlavey =

Scottish footballer

Personal information
- Date of birth: February 22, 1945
- Place of birth: Govan, Glasgow, Scotland
- Date of death: January 1, 2009 (aged 63)
- Place of death: Hamilton, Ontario, Canada
- Positions: Defender; midfielder

Senior career*
Years	Team	Apps	(Gls)
- Hamilton Imperials
- Hamilton Superga
1965	Arcadia United	4	(0)
1969	Syracuse Scorpions		
1970–1971	Washington Darts	43	(2)
1971	Washington Darts (indoor)		
1971	New York Cosmos	19	(0)
1972	Miami Gatos	5	(0)
1972	Toronto Metros	6	(0)
1974	New York Cosmos	14	(0)
1976	Hamilton Italo-Canadians		
Total		87	(2)

Managerial career
- 1978: Hamilton Italo-Canadians
- 1983–2003: McMaster Marauders (women)
- * Club domestic league appearances and goals

Frank Donlavey (22 February 1945 – 1 January 2009) was a Scottish soccer player who played in the NASL.

In 1976, he played in the National Soccer League with the Hamilton Italo-Canadians. He died on January 1, 2009.

== Managerial career ==
Donlavey served as a head coach for Hamilton Italo-Canadians in the National Soccer League in 1978. In 1983, he became the head coach for the McMaster Marauders women's soccer team.

== Career statistics ==
=== Club ===
Appearances and goals by club, season and competition
Club	Season	League			Cup		Other		Total	
Club	Season	Division	Apps	Goals	Apps	Goals	Apps	Goals	Apps	Goals
Washington Darts	1970	NASL	20	2	0	0	0	0	20	2
Washington Darts	1971	NASL	23	0	0	0	0	0	23	0
Washington Darts	Total		43	2	0	0	0	0	43	2
New York Cosmos	1971	NASL	19	0	0	0	0	0	19	0
Miami Gatos	1972	NASL	5	0	0	0	0	0	5	0
Toronto Metros	1972	NASL	6	0	0	0	0	0	6	0
New York Cosmos	1974	NASL	14	0	0	0	0	0	14	0
Career total			87	2	0	0	0	0	87	2
