= Alex Perolli =

Albanian football coach

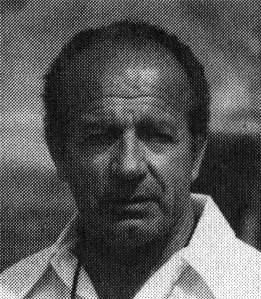
- Perolli circa 1975

Personal information
- Date of birth: 7 December 1915
- Place of birth: Tirana, Albania
- Date of death: March 19, 1994 (aged 78)
- Place of death: Montreal, Canada
- Position: Striker

Senior career*
Years	Team	Apps	(Gls)
1944–1954	SK Sturm Graz		

Managerial career
- 1955: Italy U23
- 1961: Montreal Cantalia
- 1961: Montreal Concordia
- 1969: Toronto Hellas
- 1970: Rochester Lancers
- 1973: Vera Cruz
- 1974: Los Angeles Aztecs
- 1975: San Antonio Thunder
- 1980: Rochester Lancers
- * Club domestic league appearances and goals

Alex Perolli (December 7, 1915 – March 19, 1994) was an Albanian football coach best known for coaching the Los Angeles Aztecs to a North American Soccer League championship in 1974. The following season, he coached the San Antonio Thunder for 9 games before being fired, having won only one match.

In 1955, Perolli coached the Italy U23. In 1970, he coached the Rochester Lancers for 13 games before leaving midway through the season. He coached the Mexican side Vera Cruz in 1973 before taking the helm of the expansion Aztecs the following year. On 25 September 1974, Perolli was named head coach of the San Antonio Thunder. He returned to the Lancers a decade later 8 games into the 1980 season. In 1961, he coached Montreal Cantalia in the Eastern Canada Professional Soccer League, and later with Montreal Concordia which played a dual season in the International Soccer League and National Soccer League. In 1969, he was the head coach for Toronto Hellas in the National Soccer League. He had another run in the NSL in 1976 with the Buffalo Blazers.
