= Winston Earle =

Jamaican footballer (born 1948)

Personal information
- Date of birth: 31 March 1948 (age 78)
- Place of birth: Kingston, Jamaica
- Position: Defender

Senior career*
Years	Team	Apps	(Gls)
- Santos
1968	Baltimore Bays (NASL)	16	(0)
1969	Syracuse Scorpions		
1970–1971	Rochester Lancers	9	(0)
1972–1973	Baltimore Bays (ASL)		
1974–1975	Baltimore Comets	15	(0)

Managerial career
- 1977–1979: Bay College of Maryland
- 1980–1982: Baltimore Community College
- 1982–1984: Morgan State
- 1984–1986: Coppin State
- 1992–????: Johns Hopkins (assistant)
- * Club domestic league appearances and goals

Winston Earle is a Jamaican retired footballer. After beginning his career in Jamaica with Santos, he came to the United States and from 1968 to 1975 played with several teams in the North American Soccer League and the American Soccer League. He played for the Baltimore Bays of the NASL, the Syracuse Scorpions, the Rochester Lancers, the Baltimore Bays of the ASL, and finally the Baltimore Comets. He then coached collegiate soccer, as a head coach at Bay College of Maryland, Baltimore Community College, Morgan State, and Coppin State, and as an assistant at Johns Hopkins.
