= Federación Internacional de Fútbol Rápido =

International governing body of indoor soccer

Coordinates: 47.3814°N 8.5744°E

Federación Internacional de Futbol Rapido (FIFRA)
- Formation: 2008
- Type: Federation of national sport associations
- Headquarters: Mexico
- Official language: English, Spanish
- Chief Executive Officer: Sergio Del Rio

The Federación Internacional de Fútbol Rápido, commonly known by the acronym FIFRA, was the international governing body of indoor soccer (Spanish: fútbol rápido). From 2008–2013 FIFRA was responsible for the organization and governance of indoor soccer's major international tournaments. In North America, the MASL umbrella of leagues were official affiliates of FIFRA, including the Professional Arena Soccer League and Premier Arena Soccer League.

== Member countries ==
- Argentina
- Brazil
- Canada
- Colombia
- Costa Rica
- Curaçao
- Ecuador
- El Salvador
- Guatemala
- Honduras
- Mexico
- United States
- Panama

== Board of directors ==
- MEX Alejandro Burillo – President
- MEX Sergio del Rio – CEO
- MEX Hector Zarate – Treasurer
- CAN Christian Prevost – Secretary general
- CAN John Stellato – executive member
- USA Kevin Milliken – Vice-chair
- MEX Alfredo Maccise – Vice-chair
- ESA Hector de La Vega – Vice-chair
- GER Erich Geyer – Member
- GUA Pedro Monzon – Member
