= Manfred Seissler =

German-American soccer player (born 1939)

Manny Seissler
Personal information
- Date of birth: August 8, 1939 (age 87)
- Place of birth: Germany
- Position: Forward

Youth career
- 1960–1961: KSV Hessen Kassel

Senior career*
Years	Team	Apps	(Gls)
1961–1963	Hessen Kassel	15	(3)
1963–1965	Pforzheim	18	(6)
1965–1966	Entracht Trier	0	(0)
1967	Pittsburgh Phantoms	16	(10)
1968–1970	Kansas City Spurs	48	(14)
1971–1973	Rochester Lancers	38	(14)
1971	Rochester Lancers (indoor)	2	(1)
1973	Montreal Olympique	6	(1)
1974	Syracuse Scorpions		
1974	Rochester Lancers	1	(0)

International career
1973	United States	1	(0)

Managerial career
- 1972: Rochester Lancers (assistant)
- * Club domestic league appearances and goals

Manfred "Manny" Seissler (German: Manfred Seißler) (born August 8, 1939) is a former soccer player who began his career in the lower German divisions before moving to the United States. He played one season in the National Professional Soccer League and seven in the North American Soccer League. Born in Germany, he earned one cap with the U.S. national team in 1973.

== Club career ==
=== Germany ===
Born in Germany, Seissler began his career in 1960 with the KSV Hessen Kassel junior team. In 1961, he moved to the first team which competed in the Oberliga Süd, the southern conference of the German first division back then, which preceded the creation of the Bundesliga. In 1963, he moved to Regionalliga Süd (Second Division) club 1. FC Pforzheim. In 1965, he moved to SV Eintracht Trier 05 of the Second Division.

=== United States ===
In 1967, he left Germany for the United States where he signed with the Pittsburgh Phantoms of the National Professional Soccer League. The NPSL merged with the United Soccer Association in 1968 to form the first incarnation of the North American Soccer League (NASL). The Phantoms folded and Seissler signed with the Kansas City Spurs. With the Spurs he won the NASL championship of 1969 and Seissler played with them, in the end as captain, until they folded following the 1970 season.

He then transferred to the Rochester Lancers. While with Rochester, Seissler participated in the first NASL-sanctioned indoor tournament in 1971. He scored one goal and one assist in two matches and was named to the all-tournament team. In 1973, the Lancers traded Seissler to the Montreal Olympique but it folded at the end of the season and Seissler returned to the Lancers for the 1974 season. He played only one game, then retired. During his early years in the NASL, Seissler was one of the league's top forwards, being named a first team All Star in 1969, 1970 and 1971. In 1977, he was named to the Rochester Lancers Team of the Decade. Seissler was named to the Lancers Wall of Fame in 2017.

== International career ==
Seissler earned one cap with the U.S. national team in a 4–0 loss to Poland on March 20, 1973. He started the game, but came off for Siegfried Stritzl in the 58th minute.
