= Dragan Popović =

Yugoslav association football player and coach (1941–2025)

Don Popovic
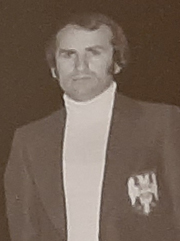
- Popović in 1974

Personal information
- Full name: Dragan Popović
- Date of birth: 1 January 1941
- Place of birth: Berane, Kingdom of Yugoslavia
- Date of death: 29 September 2025 (aged 84)
- Place of death: St. Louis, Missouri, U.S.
- Position: Midfielder

Senior career*
Years	Team	Apps	(Gls)
1963–1964	Red Star Belgrade	4	(1)
1965–1966	Hajduk Split	15	(1)
1967–1968	St. Louis Stars	17	(1)
1968–1969	Kansas City Spurs	46	(0)
1969–1971	St. Louis Stars	23	(1)
1971	St. Louis Stars (indoor)	2	(2)
1971–1973	Serbian White Eagles		

Managerial career
- 1971–1972: Serbian White Eagles (player-coach)
- 1974–1975: Serbian White Eagles
- 1976–1979: Rochester Lancers
- 1978–1983: New York Arrows
- 1983–1984: Golden Bay Earthquakes
- 1984–1985: Las Vegas Americans
- 1985–1986: Pittsburgh Spirit
- 1987: New York Express
- 1989–1992: St. Louis Storm
- * Club domestic league appearances and goals

Dragan "Don" Popovic (Serbian Cyrillic: Драган Дон Поповић; 1 January 1941 – 29 September 2025) was a Yugoslavian-born American soccer midfielder and coach. He played professionally in Yugoslavia, Canada and the North American Soccer League. He later coached in both the North American Soccer League and Major Indoor Soccer League.

In 1993 became the director of the youth soccer, Lou Fusz Soccer Club, which has teams playing in the St. Louis Youth Soccer Association (SLYSA) soccer league and the Midwest Regional League (MRL)

== Playing career ==
Popovic turned professional in 1958 at age 17 in Yugoslavia. In 1967, he moved to the United States to play for the St. Louis Stars of the first National Professional Soccer League. In 1968, the NPSL merged with the United Soccer Association to form the North American Soccer League. That year, Popovic moved to the Kansas City Spurs where he played at least one full year and perhaps part of another. In 1969, he moved back to the Stars where he finished his NASL playing career in 1971. He then moved to Canada where he played for the Serbian White Eagles of the Canadian National Soccer League until 1973. That year, he played for the Canada national team in an exhibition game with Arsenal F.C.

== Managerial career ==
While playing for the St. Louis Stars, Popovic also served as an assistant coach. In 1974, Popovic became the head coach of the Serbian White Eagles. He took the team to the 1975 Canadian National Soccer League championship. In 1976, the Rochester Lancers of the North American Soccer League hired Popovic as head coach. In 1978, the New York Arrows entered the newly created Major Indoor Soccer League. It drew most of its players from the Lancers and hired Popovic as head coach. He led the Arrows to four consecutive MISL championships (1979–1982). The Arrows fired him at the end of February 1983 and he was hired a week later to coach the Golden Bay Earthquakes. He coached the Earthquakes during the 1983 and 1985 outdoor seasons as well as the 1983–1984 indoor season. The Earthquakes sat out the 1984–1985 indoor season. On 16 December 1984, the Las Vegas Americans hired Popovic to replace player-coach Alan Mayer as head coach. When the Americans folded in June 1985, Popovic was hired by the Pittsburgh Spirit. The Spirit folded at the end of the season and Popovic committed to coaching a team in Portugal. In December 1985, the New York Express made an offer to hire Popovic. While he began running practices and overseeing player acquisitions and even coached one game in late January 1987, the team never signed him to a contract. When no coaching jobs became available, Popovic entered the real estate business. In 1989, the expansion St. Louis Storm hired Popovic. He coached the team for nearly three seasons before being fired in March 1992. He was inducted into the St. Louis Soccer Hall of Fame in 2004.

== Death ==
Popović died on 29 September 2025, at the age of 84.

== Honors ==
=== As player ===
- NASL All League First Team while playing for the St. Louis Stars: 1971
- NASL All Tournament while playing for the St. Louis Stars in an indoor tournament: 1971

=== As coach ===
- National Soccer League Regular Season while coaching the Serbian White Eagles: 1974
- Canadian Open Cup while coaching the Serbian White Eagles: 1974
- Coach of the Year while coaching the New York Arrows: 1981
- Coach of the Year while coaching the Golden Bay Earthquakes: 1983
- Inducted into the St. Louis Soccer Hall of Fame: 2004

== Youth Soccer Highlights ==
Popovic was the head coach for the following championship teams:

- 2000 Missouri State Cup, Boys U-13 (under 13 years of age)
- 2001 Missouri State Cup, Boys U-14 (under 14 years of age)
- 2008 Missouri State Cup, Boys U-14 (under 14 years of age)
- 2007 Missouri State Cup, Boys U-13 (under 13 years of age)
- 2006 Missouri State Cup, Boys U-15 (under 15 years of age)
- 2003 Missouri State Cup, Boys U-15 (under 15 years of age)
- 2010 Missouri State Cup, Boys U-16 (under 16 years of age)
