= Claude Campos =

Brazilian footballer

Personal information
- Place of birth: Brazil
- Height: 5 ft 10 in (1.78 m)
- Position: Goalkeeper

Senior career*
Years	Team	Apps	(Gls)
1969–1970	Syracuse Scorpions		
1970–1974	Rochester Lancers	65	(0)
1974	Rochester Lancers (indoor)		
1976	New Jersey Americans		
Total		65+	(0+)
- * Club domestic league appearances and goals

Claude Campos is a Brazilian retired footballer who played as a goalkeeper.

== Career ==
Campos played in the United States for the Syracuse Scorpions (in the ASL), the Rochester Lancers (in the NASL), and the New Jersey Americans (in the ASL).

In 1971, Graham Leggat kicked Campos in the face in a game between the Lancers and the Toronto Metros. The kick broke Campos' jaw in five places. In 1977, he was named to the Rochester Lancers Team of the Decade.
