= Peter Short (footballer) =

English footballer (1944–1984)

Personal information
- Date of birth: 27 October 1944
- Place of birth: Liverpool, England
- Date of death: 22 February 1984 (aged 39)
- Place of death: Los Angeles, California, U.S.
- Positions: Defender; forward

Senior career*
Years	Team	Apps	(Gls)
1967	Philadelphia Spartans	12	(4)
1968	Cleveland Stokers	24	(0)
1969	Dallas Tornado	16	(6)
1970–1973	Rochester Lancers	75	(6)
1971	Rochester Lancers (indoor)	2	(0)
1974	Dallas Tornado	8	(0)
1975	Denver Dynamos	19	(3)
1975	Vancouver Whitecaps	1	(0)
1976	Dallas Tornado (indoor)		
1976–1977	Minnesota Kicks	19	(1)
Total		174	(20)
- * Club domestic league appearances and goals

Peter Short (27 October 1944 – 22 February 1984) was an English professional footballer who played as a defender and a forward. Active in the United States and Canada, Short made over 150 appearances in a career lasting 11 seasons.

== Career ==
Born in Liverpool, Short played professionally in the United States and Canada for the Philadelphia Spartans, the Cleveland Stokers, the Dallas Tornado, the Rochester Lancers, the Denver Dynamos, the Vancouver Whitecaps and the Minnesota Kicks. In 1966, he played in the Eastern Canada Professional Soccer League with Toronto Italia Falcons. After the conclusion of the ECPSL season he played in the American Soccer League with Newark Ukrainian Sitch. Short scored the first goal in the first game of the National Professional Soccer League, held on 16 April 1967.

Short was shot in the chest and killed during an attempted robbery at his cloth cutting business near the Coliseum in Los Angeles in 1984.

== Awards and honors ==
Short was an NASL first team All-Star in 1971 and 1972. He was also named to the All-Tournament team of the NASL's first indoor tournament in 1971. In 1977, he was named to the Rochester Lancers Team of the Decade. On 27 December 2014, the Rochester Lancers of the Major Arena Soccer League will induct Short into the Rochester Lancers Wall of Fame as one of Rochester's "soccer pioneers". Short played for the original Rochester Lancers of the North American Soccer League.
