= 1971 CONCACAF Champions' Cup =

7th edition of premier club football tournament organized by CONCACAF

Tournament details
- Dates: August 22, 1971 – April 19, 1972
- Teams: 22 (from 12 associations)

Final positions
- Champions: (Mexico) Cruz Azul (3rd title)
- Runners-up: (Costa Rica) Alajuelense
- All statistics correct as of On January 6, 2012.

The 1971 CONCACAF Champions' Cup was the 7th edition of the annual international club football competition held in the CONCACAF region (North America, Central America and the Caribbean), the CONCACAF Champions' Cup. It determined that year's club champion of association football in the CONCACAF region. It was played from August 22, 1971, till April 19, 1972, under the home/away match system.

The teams were split into 3 zones (North American, Central American and Caribbean), each one qualifying two teams to the final tournament, played for the first time in a group system. After the end of the group, a playoff match had to be played because two teams ended with the same points in the lead of the group. This tournament included the Rochester Lancers, the only team from the original North American Soccer League to take part.

Cruz Azul from Mexico won the final, and became for the third time in its history became CONCACAF champion.

== North American Zone ==
October 3, 1971	Elizabeth (United States)	0–0	(Mexico) Cruz Azul	Elizabeth, United States
				Stadium: Farcher's Grove

October 13, 1971	Cruz Azul (Mexico)	2–0 (2–0 agg.)	(United States) Elizabeth	Mexico City, Mexico
				Stadium: Estadio Azteca
Note: Elizabeth S.C. forfeit

Elizabeth S.C. forfeit.

(Mexico) Cruz Azul advanced to the CONCACAF Final Tournament.

September 19, 1971	Rochester Lancers (United States)	4–1	(Bermuda) Pembroke Hamilton	Rochester, United States
				Stadium: Aquinas Memorial Stadium
Note:

September 26, 1971	Pembroke Hamilton (Bermuda)	3–1 (4–5 agg.)	(United States) Rochester Lancers	Hamilton, Bermuda
				Stadium: Bermuda National Stadium
Note:

(United States) Rochester Lancers advanced to the CONCACAF Final Tournament.

== Central American Zone ==
=== Preliminary round ===
August 22, 1971	Diriangén (Nicaragua)	0–5	(Guatemala) Comunicaciones	Diriamba, Nicaragua
			Omar Larrosa; Enrique Mendoza; Hector Tambasco	Stadium: Estadio Colegio La Salle

August 29, 1971	Comunicaciones (Guatemala)	10–1 (15–1 agg.)	(Nicaragua) Diriangén	Guatemala City, Guatemala
	Hernán Godoy; Omar Larrosa			Stadium: Estadio Doroteo Guamuch Flores

- Comunicaciones advanced to the First Round.

=== First round ===
August 22, 1971	Aurora (Guatemala)	2–1	(El Salvador) Atlético Marte	San Salvador, El Salvador
	Alex Frank; Edgar Gonzalez			Stadium: Estadio Jorge "El Mágico" González

August 29, 1971	Atlético Marte (El Salvador)	1–1 (2–3 agg.)	(Guatemala) Aurora	Guatemala City, Guatemala
	Sergio Mendez		Edgar Gonzalez	Stadium: Estadio Doroteo Guamuch Flores

(Guatemala) Aurora advanced to the Second Round.

September 19, 1971	Motagua (Honduras)	0–3	(Costa Rica) Saprissa	Tegucigalpa, Honduras
			Hernán Morales 10'; Fernando Hernández 18'; Edgar Marín 60'	Stadium: Estadio Tiburcio Carías Andino; Referee: Ramón Molinero (GUA)

September 26, 1971	Saprissa (Costa Rica)	2–0 (5–0 agg.)	(Honduras) Motagua	San José, Costa Rica
	Odir Jacques 22' 65'			Stadium: Estadio Ricardo Saprissa Aymá; Referee: Ramón Molinero (GUA)

(Costa Rica) Saprissa advanced to the Second Round.

September 26, 1971	Comunicaciones (Guatemala)	5–2	(El Salvador) FAS	Guatemala City, Guatemala
	Omar Larrosa; Oscar Molina; Hugo Torres		David Cabrera; Ricardo “la Tuca” Gómez	Stadium: Estadio Doroteo Guamuch Flores

October 3, 1971	FAS (El Salvador)	0–3 (2–8 agg.)	(Guatemala) Comunicaciones	Santa Ana, El Salvador
			Hernán Godoy; Peter Sandoval; Hugo Torres	Stadium: Estadio Óscar Quiteño

(Guatemala) Comunicaciones advance to the second round

September 26, 1971	Olimpia (Honduras)	0–0	(Costa Rica) Alajuelense	Tegucigalpa, Honduras
				Stadium: Estadio Tiburcio Carías Andino

October 12, 1971	Alajuelense (Costa Rica)	1–0 (1–0 agg.)	(Honduras) Olimpia	Alajuela, Costa Rica
	Walter Elizondo			Stadium: Estadio Alejandro Morera Soto; Attendance: 5,775

(Costa Rica) Alajuelense advanced to the Second Round.

=== Second round ===
November 7, 1971	Aurora (Guatemala)	1–2	(Guatemala) Comunicaciones	Guatemala City, Guatemala
	Rolando Valdez		Oscar Molina	Stadium: Estadio del Ejército

November 14, 1971	Comunicaciones (Guatemala)	1–0 (3–1 agg.)	(Guatemala) Aurora	Guatemala City, Guatemala
	(o.g.)			Stadium: Estadio Doroteo Guamuch Flores

(Guatemala) Comunicaciones advance to the Final Tournament

November 14, 1971	Saprissa (Costa Rica)	1–5	(Costa Rica) Alajuelense	Heredia, Costa Rica
	Carlos Solano 52'		Mario Vega 27'; Alfredo Piedra 47'; Chávez 49'; Victor Ruiz 65'; Oscar Cordero 88'	Stadium: Estadio Eladio Rosabal Cordero

November 21, 1971	Alajuelense (Costa Rica)	0–3 (5–4 agg.)	(Costa Rica) Saprissa	Alajuela, Costa Rica
			Francisco Hernández 5'; Jaime Grant 10' 48'	Stadium: Estadio Alejandro Morera Soto

(Costa Rica) Alajuelense advanced to the Final Tournament

== Caribbean Zone ==
September 30, 1971	Transvaal (Suriname (Kingdom of the Netherlands))	3–1	(Guyana) Thomas United
			Pierre

October 5, 1971	Thomas United (Guyana)	0–3 (1–6 agg.)	(Suriname (Kingdom of the Netherlands)) Transvaal

(Suriname (Kingdom of the Netherlands)) Transvaal advanced to the Final Tournament

Estrella (Netherlands Antilles)	w.o.	(Haiti) Aigle Noir

(Netherlands Antilles) Estrella advance to the Final Tournament

== CONCACAF Final Tournament ==
Pos	Team	Pld	W	D	L	GF	GA	GD	Pts	Qualification
1	(Mexico) Cruz Azul	5	3	2	0	17	4	+13	8	Forced to a playoff
2	(Costa Rica) Alajuelense	5	4	0	1	8	5	+3	8	Forced to a playoff
3	(Guatemala) Comunicaciones (H)	5	2	1	2	15	7	+8	5	
4	(United States) Rochester Lancers	5	2	1	2	6	5	+1	5	
5	(Suriname (Kingdom of the Netherlands)) Transvaal	5	1	2	2	3	8	−5	4	
6	(Netherlands Antilles) Estrella	5	0	0	5	1	21	−20	0	

(H) Hosts
- After the end of the group stage a playoff match had to be played due to Cruz Azul and Alajuelense ended with the same points in the lead of the group.
- The final tournament was played in Guatemala City.

March 12, 1972	Rochester Lancers (United States)	2–0	(Suriname (Kingdom of the Netherlands)) Transvaal	Guatemala City, Guatemala
	Eli Durante; Carlos Dell’Omodarme			Stadium: Mateo Flores Stadium; Attendance: 42,000

March 12, 1972	Comunicaciones (Guatemala)	7–0	(Netherlands Antilles) Estrella	Guatemala City, Guatemala
	Héctor Tambasco; Carlos Guzmán; Enrique Mendoza; Antonio Rojas; Oscar Molina			Stadium: Mateo Flores Stadium; Attendance: 42,000

March 14, 1972	Alajuelense (Costa Rica)	2–1	(Netherlands Antilles) Estrella
	Emilio Valle		Ismael Croes

March 14, 1972	Cruz Azul (Mexico)	1–1	(Suriname (Kingdom of the Netherlands)) Transvaal	Guatemala City, Guatemala
	Octavio Muciño		Edwin Schal	Stadium: Mateo Flores Stadium

March 16, 1972	Cruz Azul (Mexico)	1–1	(United States) Rochester Lancers	Guatemala City, Guatemala
	Manfred Seissler		José Luis Desachy	Stadium: Mateo Flores Stadium; Attendance: 25,000

March 16, 1972	Comunicaciones (Guatemala)	3–1	(Suriname (Kingdom of the Netherlands)) Transvaal	Guatemala City, Guatemala
	Héctor Tambasco		Edwin Schal	Stadium: Mateo Flores Stadium; Attendance: 25,000

March 20, 1972	Rochester Lancers (United States)	2–0	(Netherlands Antilles) Estrella	Guatemala City, Guatemala
	Francisco Escos; Charlie Mitchell			Stadium: Mateo Flores Stadium; Attendance: 20,000

March 20, 1972	Comunicaciones (Guatemala)	1–2	(Costa Rica) Alajuelense	Guatemala City, Guatemala
	Antonio Rojas		Walter Elizondo	Stadium: Mateo Flores Stadium; Attendance: 20,000

March 22, 1972	Alajuelense (Costa Rica)	2–0	(Suriname (Kingdom of the Netherlands)) Transvaal	Guatemala City, Guatemala
	Roy Saénz; Emilio Valle			Stadium: Mateo Flores Stadium; Attendance: 6,000

March 22, 1972	Cruz Azul (Mexico)	9–0	(Netherlands Antilles) Estrella	Guatemala City, Guatemala
	Octavio Muciño; Cesareo Victorino; Alberto Gómez; Fernando Bustos; Antonio Munguía			Stadium: Mateo Flores Stadium

March 23, 1972	Cruz Azul (Mexico)	3–1	(Costa Rica) Alajuelense
	Fernando Busto; Octavio Muciño		Carlos Mejía

March 23, 1972	Comunicaciones (Guatemala)	3–1	(United States) Rochester Lancers
	Oscar Molina; Peter Sandoval		Manfred Seissler

March 26, 1972	Transvaal (Suriname (Kingdom of the Netherlands))	1–0	(Netherlands Antilles) Estrella	Guatemala City, Guatemala
	Edwin Schal			Stadium: Mateo Flores Stadium; Attendance: 1,500

March 26, 1972	Alajuelense (Costa Rica)	1–0	(United States) Rochester Lancers	Guatemala City, Guatemala
	Walter Elizondo			Stadium: Mateo Flores Stadium; Attendance: 40,000

March 26, 1972	Cruz Azul (Mexico)	3–1	(Guatemala) Comunicaciones	Guatemala City, Guatemala
	Octavio Muciño; Javier Guzmán		Oscar Molina	Stadium: Mateo Flores Stadium; Attendance: 40,000

=== Playoff ===
April 19, 1972
Playoff

Cruz Azul (Mexico)	5–1	(Costa Rica) Alajuelense
Bustos 16'; Vera 25', 60'; Muciño 70', 75' (pen.)		Villalobos 43'

Estadio Azteca, Mexico City
Referee: Henry Dandawer (USA)

Team details

Cruz Azul
Alajuelense

GK	(Argentina) Miguel Marín
DF	(Mexico) Marco Antonio Ramírez
DF	(Mexico) Javier Guzmán
DF	(Chile) Alberto Quintano
DF	(Mexico) Javier Sánchez
MF	(Mexico) Jesús Prado
MF	(Mexico) Héctor Pulido
MF	(Mexico) Antonio Munguía	(substituted off) 75'
FW	(Mexico) Fernando Bustos	(substituted off) 72'
FW	(Mexico) Octavio Muciño
FW	(Paraguay) Eladio Vera
Substitutions:
MF	(Mexico) Antonio Gutiérrez	(substituted on) 72'
FW	(Mexico) Cesáreo Victorino	(substituted on) 75'
Manager:
(Mexico) Raúl Cárdenas

GK	(Panama) Roberto Tyrrel
DF	(Costa Rica) Luis Castro
DF	(Costa Rica) Walter Elizondo
DF	(Costa Rica) José Cedeño
DF	(Costa Rica) José M. Agüero
MF	(Costa Rica) Álvaro Vega
MF	(Costa Rica) Oscar Cordero
MF	(Costa Rica) Juan José Gámez
MF	(Costa Rica) Roy Sáenz
FW	(Costa Rica) Rolando Villalobos
FW	(Costa Rica) William Quiroz
Manager:
(Argentina) Juan Colecchio

== Champion ==
CONCACAF Champions' Cup
1971 Champion
(Mexico)
Cruz Azul
Third title
