= Brookland Stadium =

Former athletic field

- Killion Field
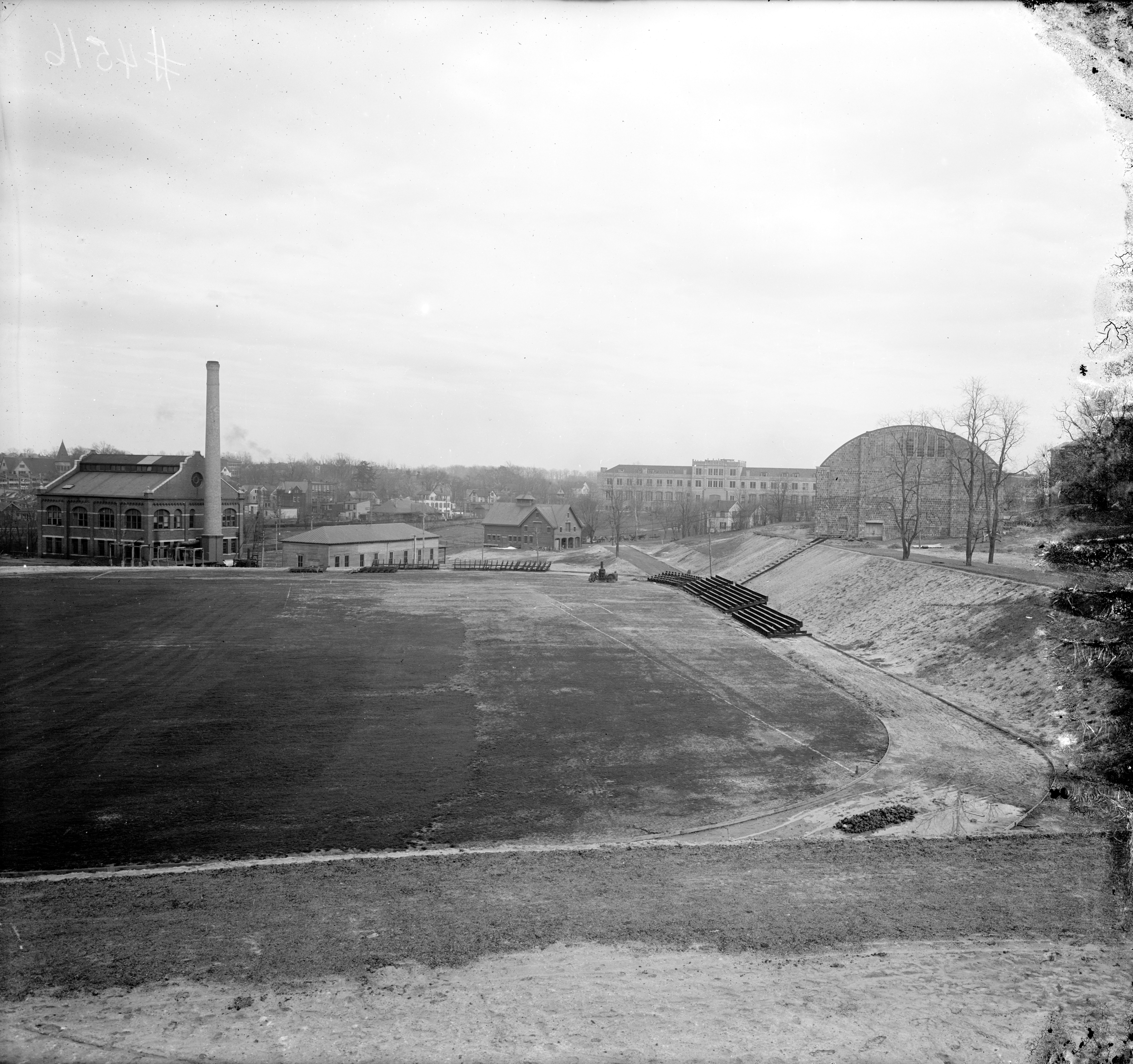
- The stadium under construction
- Interactive map of Brookland Stadium
- Location: Brookland, WA
- Owner: Catholic University
- Operator: Catholic University
- Capacity: 30,000
- Surface: Grass
- Current use: Football; Baseball; Soccer

Construction
- Opened: 1924-10
- Closed: 1985; 41 years ago

Tenants
- Catholic University (NCAA) teams: football / soccer / baseball; Professional teams: Washington Darts (NASL)

Brookland Stadium, or Killion Field, was a stadium in Brookland, Washington, D.C., serving as the athletic field for the Catholic University Cardinals from 1924 to 1985. It was named after alumni Captain Edward Lucien Killion, who died in France during World War I.

The stadium was located on the main campus of The Catholic University of America, next to Brookland Gymnasium (today's Edward M. Crough Center for Architectural Studies), in the area now occupied by the Columbus School of Law and the Law School Lawn.

Primarily used for college football, it was also a baseball and soccer stadium. It hosted the second leg of the 1970 NASL Final between the Rochester Lancers and the Washington Darts.

== History ==
In the early 1920s, rector Thomas Joseph Shahan was the biggest booster for the new stadium, saying he expected "the finished Bowl would be our chief financial asset". On May 26, 1923, ground was broken. Engineering professor Louis Crook served as the stadium's planner.

On September 30, 1924, Boston College's student newspaper The Heights wrote:

The completion of Catholic University's new Stadium, which will accommodate 30,000 people, signalizes the venture of the Brookland institution into a higher plane of college athletics than that school has heretofore known.

Catholic University plans to take its place in the athletic world among the foremost colleges of the East. Everything points to the ultimate admission of Catholic University into the Jesuit College circuit, composed of Georgetown, Boston College, Holy Cross and Fordham. Maybe not for a year or two, but it is highly probable that before many years roll by Catholic University will become a member of that select circle in which the rivalry is so intense and the competition of the highest order.

The new stadium is but the beginning of a new era for Catholic University in the sport world. New and stronger opponents will be taken on. Holy Cross will be met in football this season, and Notre Dame's appearance on the Brookland gridiron in 1925 is practically assured.

The stadium was dedicated on October 4, 1924, with a game against the Quantico Marines Devil Dogs, with President Calvin Coolidge in attendance, to become the new home of the Catholic University Cardinals football team.

On October 29, 1983, Brookland Stadium hosted the last important football game with a victory of the Cardinals over the Georgetown Hoyas in the nation's capital own Holy War for the Steven Dean Memorial Trophy.

In 1983, ground was broken by Marion Barry, Mayor of the District of Columbia, and William J. Byron, President of Catholic University of America, for a new athletic facility, the Raymond A. DuFour Athletic Center, opened in 1985. It includes Cardinal Stadium, Brookland Stadium's replacement.
