= Bob DiLuca =

Canadian soccer player (born 1946)

Personal information
- Date of birth: 30 August 1946 (age 80)
- Place of birth: Italy
- Height: 1.78 m (5 ft 10 in)
- Positions: Defender; midfielder

Senior career*
Years	Team	Apps	(Gls)
1968	Toronto Hawks		
1970	Rochester Lancers	0	(0)
1971	Toronto Metros	5	(0)
1975	Connecticut Yankees		

International career
1967	Canada Olympic	7	(0)
1968	Canada	4	(0)
- * Club domestic league appearances and goals

Bob DiLuca (born 30 August 1946) is a Canadian former international soccer player who played as a defender and midfielder.

== Early and personal life ==
DiLuca was born in Italy and was raised in Belgium and Canada.

== Career ==
DiLuca played for Toronto Hawks, Rochester Lancers, Toronto Metros and Connecticut Yankees.

He made 7 appearances for the Canada Olympic team in 1967, and 4 appearances for the senior team in 1968. He represented Canada at the 1967 Pan American Games.
