= John Kerr (soccer, born 1943) =

Soccer player (1943–2011)

Personal information
- Date of birth: 15 October 1943
- Place of birth: Glasgow, Scotland
- Date of death: 19 June 2011 (aged 67)
- Place of death: North Carolina, United States
- Position: Midfielder

Youth career
- Partick Thistle

Senior career*
Years	Team	Apps	(Gls)
1961–1967	Hamilton Steelers /-Primos		
1968	Detroit Cougars	26	(9)
1969–1971	Washington Darts		
1971	Washington Darts (indoor)	2	(1)
1971	New York Hota		
1972	New York Cosmos	14	(3)
1972–1973	Club América		
1973–1975	New York Cosmos	36	(2)
1976–1977	Washington Diplomats	33	(0)

International career
1968–1977	Canada	10	(0)

Managerial career
- 1977: Washington Diplomats (assistant)
- Fairfax Spartans
- 1987–1990: Washington Stars
- 1993–1994: Richmond Kickers
- * Club domestic league appearances and goals

John Kerr Sr. (15 October 1943 – 19 June 2011) was a professional soccer player who played as a midfielder. Born in Scotland, he played for the Canada men's national team.

== Club career ==
Kerr began his professional career with Partick Thistle in Scotland. When his mother moved to Canada, Kerr followed and emigrated to the Toronto area before signing with the Hamilton Steelers/Primos in the Eastern Canada Professional Soccer League and later in the National Soccer League (NSL). He also played with Hamilton Croatia in the NSL. In 1968, he played in the North American Soccer League with the Detroit Cougars. In 1969, he joined the Washington Darts of the second division American Soccer League where he was a First Team All Star. The Darts moved up to the NASL in 1970 and Kerr remained with the team through the 1971 season. He was the league's 14th leading scorer with Washington in 1971 with 18 points in 24 games. He scored Washington only goal of the NASL's first-ever indoor tournament in 1971. He also played for New York Hota of the German American Soccer League when it won the 1971 National Challenge Cup. He also played for Club América of Mexico in the early 1970s. In 1972, Kerr became a member of the New York Cosmos. In 1972, he was again the league's 14th top scorer with 10 points in 14 games with the Cosmos and was named league First Team All-Star at midfield. He then played the 1976 and 1977 seasons with the Washington Diplomats, serving during the 1977 season as an assistant coach. However, on 17 July 1977, the Dips informed Kerr that the team planned to release him.

== International career ==
Kerr played ten times for Canada, four times in World Cup qualifying in 1968, five times in W.C. qualifying in 1976 and once in a 1977 friendly. Canada failed to qualify for either World Cup.

== Coaching ==
Kerr coached the Georgetown University freshman soccer team in 1970 and then coached the American Eagles men's soccer team in 1971. Kerr took the amateur Fairfax Spartans to the 1986 National Amateur Cup. In 1987, the Spartans became known as F.C. Washington and later the Washington Stars as it entered the American Soccer League. Kerr was hired as head coach of the Stars on 24 June 1987. He coached the Stars until the team folded following the 1990 American Professional Soccer League season. Kerr was head coach of the Richmond Kickers in 1993–94.

He was the Major League Soccer's Players Association executive director during the late 1990s.

Kerr coached the varsity boys' team at Hilton Head High School in Hilton Head Island, South Carolina in the mid-2000s. At the time of his death, Kerr was coaching for Triangle Futbol Club in Raleigh, North Carolina.

== Personal life ==
In 2008, Kerr was inducted into the Virginia-DC Soccer Hall of Fame. In 2015 Kerr was inducted as a builder into the Canadian Soccer Hall of Fame. Kerr's son John Kerr Jr. is a former American international.
