= Frank Odoi (footballer) =

Ghanaian footballer (born 1943)

Personal information
- Date of birth: 23 February 1943 (age 83)
- Place of birth: Accra, Ghana
- Height: 5 ft 3 in (1.60 m)
- Position: Midfielder

Senior career*
Years	Team	Apps	(Gls)
1962	Accra Standfast		
1963–1967	Great Olympics		
1968	Washington Whips	6	(0)
1969	Syracuse Scorpions		
1970–1978	Rochester Lancers	125	(8)
1979–1980	Buffalo Stallions (indoor)	11	(1)

International career
1963–1968	Ghana		

Managerial career
- 1996–?: Rochester Rhinos (assistant)
- * Club domestic league appearances and goals

Frank Odoi (born 23 February 1943) is a Ghanaian former professional footballer who played as a midfielder in Ghana and the United States. He was a member of Ghana's 1964 Olympic football team.

== Club career ==
In 1962, Odoi finished his degree in mechanical engineering at Kaneshie Technical College. That year, he began his football career with second division Standfast FC. In 1963, he moved to Great Olympics in the Ghana Premier League. In 1968, he left Ghana to move to the United States where he signed with the Washington Whips of the North American Soccer League. In 1969, he moved to the second division Syracuse Scorpions of the American Soccer League before returning to the NASL in 1970, this time with the Rochester Lancers. He spent nine seasons with the Lancers. In 1977, he was named to the Rochester Lancers Team of the Decade. In 1979, he joined the Buffalo Stallions of the Major Indoor Soccer League for one season.

== International career ==
Odoi was called up to the Ghana national team in 1963. In 1964, he played one game for Ghana at the 1964 Summer Olympics. He also represented Ghana at the 1965 African Cup of Nations and scored twice, including the extra-time goal to defeat Tunisia in the final.

== Coaching career ==
In 1996, the newly established Rochester Rhinos hired Odoi as an assistant coach.
