= Holleder Memorial Stadium =

Football stadium in Rochester, New York, U.S.

Coordinates: 43.193°N 77.657°W

- Interactive map of Holleder Memorial Stadium
- Former names: Aquinas Memorial Stadium
- Owner: Aquinas Institute
- Operator: Aquinas Institute
- Capacity: 20,000
- Surface: Grass

Construction
- Opened: 1949
- Closed: 1985
- Demolished: 1985

Tenants
- Original stadium: Aquinas Institute (1949–1985); Rochester Rockets (Ontario Rugby Football Union) (1956); Rochester Lancers (ASL/NASL) (1967–1980); Rochester Flash (ASL/USL) (1981–82, 1984); Wegmans Sports Complex: Rochester Rattlers (2016); Rochester Lancers (2016–present)

Holleder Memorial Stadium was a 20,000 seat football stadium in Rochester, New York.

Located on Ridgeway Avenue, at the south east corner of Mount Read Blvd., it was built in 1949 to serve as the home of Aquinas Institute football.

Originally named Aquinas Memorial Stadium, it was renamed in 1974, in memory of former Aquinas and Army quarterback Major Don Holleder, who was killed on 17 October 1967, in the Battle of Ong Thanh and was posthumously awarded the Distinguished Service Cross, Silver Star, Soldier's Medal, Bronze Star medal with three Oak Leaf clusters, Purple Heart, Army Commendation Medal with an Oak Leaf cluster and Air Medal with 7 Oak Leaf clusters.

It was the home to the short-lived Rochester Rockets of the Ontario Rugby Football Union, the first U.S. entry into the league, in 1956. Despite a crowd of 4,000 for its first pre-season game, the Rockets were later barred from the stadium after its second-regular season game due to noise complaints by the neighborhood residents. The team failed to find a new home venue and ceased operations on November 15, 1956. The team lost all four of its games it played.

The first ever win for the Buffalo Bills of the American Football League was held at the stadium; on August 13, 1960, the Bills won an exhibition game against the Denver Broncos. The Bills continued to host occasional exhibition games at the stadium through the 1960s.

Holleder Stadium was the home pitch for professional soccer's Rochester Lancers, who played at Holleder from 1967–69 as members of the American Soccer League, and 1970–80 while in the NASL. On August 21, 1977, 20,005 people, the largest crowd to attend a Lancers game at Holleder Stadium, watched Pelé lead his Cosmos to a 2–1 victory over the hometown Lancers in the first round of the 1977 NASL playoffs. It was also the host of the first match of the NASL Final 1970.

Holleder Stadium also hosted the Rochester Flash soccer team, who called Holleder Stadium home in 1981–82 (ASL) and 1984 (USL).

The stadium was torn down in 1985, and an industrial park, named Holleder Technology Park, was built on the site. Aquinas would eventually replace the stadium in 2005 with the Wegmans Sports Complex, with a smaller capacity.

== Concerts ==
The stadium hosted several musical concerts, including:

- The Grateful Dead - September 1, 1979
- Journey and Bryan Adams - June 5, 1983
- The Police, The Fixx and A Flock of Seagulls - August 7, 1983

The Rochester Grey Knights held the Tournament of Drums(Drum and Bugle competition) annually from 1948–1968.

Drum Corps Associates held the Senior Drum and Bugle Championships there in 1968-1971 and 1973–1976.
