= Gerry Browne =

Trinidad and Tobago footballer

Personal information
- Date of birth: 9 December 1944 (age 81)
- Position: Forward

Senior career*
Years	Team	Apps	(Gls)
- Belmont Colts
1964–1967	Regiment		
1970–1971	Washington Darts		

International career
1965–1967	Trinidad and Tobago	4	(1)
- * Club domestic league appearances and goals

Gerry Browne (born 9 December 1944) is a Trinidad and Tobago former footballer.
