= Charlie Mitchell (footballer) =

Scottish American soccer player and coach

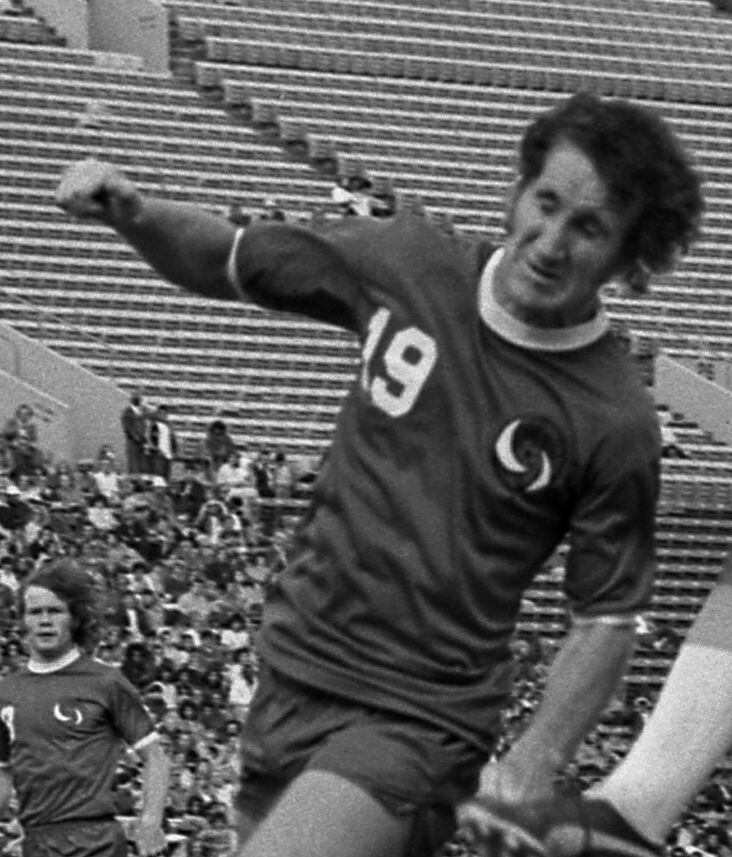
- Mitchell playing for the New York Cosmos in 1976

Personal information
- Date of birth: 18 May 1948 (age 78)
- Place of birth: Paisley, Scotland
- Position: Defender

Senior career*
Years	Team	Apps	(Gls)
- St Mirren F.C.
1969	Sudbury Italia		
1970–1975	Rochester Lancers	121	(5)
1976	New York Cosmos	7	(0)
1977	Team Hawaii	23	(0)
1978	Tulsa Roughnecks	25	(0)
1979	Toronto Blizzard	30	(0)

Managerial career
- 1977: Team Hawaii
- 1980–1981: Tulsa Roughnecks
- 1996–2005: Northeastern State RiverHawks (men & women)
- * Club domestic league appearances and goals

Charlie Mitchell is a Scottish American former soccer defender and coach. He played ten seasons in the North American Soccer League from 1970 to 1979.

== Club career ==
Mitchell played for St Mirren F.C. in his native Scotland. In 1969, he played in the National Soccer League with Sudbury Italia.

He joined the Rochester Lancers of the NASL in 1970. The Lancers won the NASL championship in 1970, and Mitchell was named an NASL all-star. He was an NASL second-team all-star in 1971 and 1975, and an honorable mention all-star in 1972 and 1974. In 1977, he was named to the Rochester Lancers Team of the Decade.

In 1976 he moved to the New York Cosmos, where he had an assist on a spectacular bicycle kick goal scored by his teammate Pelé in a game against the Miami Toros.

In 1977 Mitchell played for Team Hawaii, where he became player-manager in mid-season. Team Hawaii moved to Tulsa in 1978 and became the Tulsa Roughnecks; Mitchell was the only player Tulsa retained from the Hawaii roster.

Mitchell played the 1979 season for a Toronto Blizzard, and finished his NASL playing career with a total of 206 NASL regular-season games and nine NASL playoff games. He also served as an assistant coach for Toronto throughout the season.

== Coaching career ==
After ending his playing career, Mitchell returned to Tulsa as manager of the Roughnecks. The 1980 team finished with a 15–17 record and lost to the Cosmos in the first round of the playoffs. His 1981 team started with an 11–10 record, but in July 1981, Mitchell was replaced by his assistant Terry Hennessey. Sports Illustrated reported that this was due to team management's dissatisfaction with the Roughnecks' low-scoring offense.

== Later career ==
Mitchell remained a popular figure in Tulsa, as a participant in local youth soccer programs, and as a sports bar-restaurant operator. He coached the men's and women's soccer teams at Northeastern State University in Tahlequah, Oklahoma for nine years until his resignation in June 2005.
