= Carlos Metidieri =

Soccer player (born 1942)

Personal information
- Full name: Jose Carlos Metidieri
- Date of birth: December 18, 1942 (age 83)
- Place of birth: Sorocaba, Brazil
- Height: 5 ft 4 in (1.63 m)
- Position: Forward

Senior career*
Years	Team	Apps	(Gls)
1963–1964	Toronto Italia	?	(70)
1964–1965	Boston Metros	?	(?)
1965–1966	Toronto Italia	?	(70)
1967	Boston Rovers	0	(0)
1967	Toronto Inter-Roma		
1968	Los Angeles Wolves	32	(16)
1970–1973	Rochester Lancers	78	(40)
1971	Rochester Lancers (indoor)	2	(1)
1974–1975	Boston Minutemen	20	(5)
1978	Buffalo Blazers		
1979–1980	Buffalo Stallions (indoor)	32	(10)

International career
1973	United States	8	(0)
- * Club domestic league appearances and goals

Jose Carlos Metidieri (born December 18, 1942) is a retired soccer player who played as a forward. He played professionally in Canada with Toronto Italia and the United States with the Rochester Lancers. He was the leading scorer of the North American Soccer League in 1970 and 1971 with the Lancers and was named the league's Most Valuable Player—the only player in the league's history to receive both awards in consecutive seasons. Born in Brazil, he earned two caps for the United States national team in 1973.

== Club career ==
Metidieri began playing soccer at age 16 at the local club Clube Atlético Votorantim. Thereafter, he was contracted by SE Palmeiras of Säo Paulo from where he moved to Italy, to play for SSC Napoli. His young age and limits on the number of foreigners playing on Italian teams caused him to soon leave this club to join Como Calcio. While there, a broken arm was a major setback to his development.

Known as Topolino ("Little Mouse" in Italian; also the name of Mickey Mouse in Italy) due to his 5'4" stature and explosive speed on the field, moved on to Canada and joined Toronto Italia of the Eastern Canada Professional Soccer League in 1963. There he was the 1965 and 1966 league leading scorer and the 1966 Most Valuable Player. In 1967, he moved to the Boston Rovers in the United Soccer Association before joining the Los Angeles Wolves, alongside cousin Gilson, for the North American Soccer League's first season. During his tenure with Boston he was permitted to play in the National Soccer League (NSL) with Toronto Inter-Roma.

After one season in Los Angeles, Metidieri moved to the Rochester Lancers. He achieved his 'double double' with the Lancers, a team he played with for four summers. In 1971, he was the MVP and league leading scorer. Rochester fans affectionately remember his game-winning goal in the longest professional soccer match ever played lasting 176 minutes in duration at Holleder Stadium against the visiting Dallas Tornado in 1971. He scored 35 points in 23 games in 1970 and 46 points, including 19 goals, in 24 games in 1971. In 1971 as a member of the Lancers, Metidieri also took part in the league's first ever indoor tournament, scoring one goal and earning two penalty minutes.

Metidieri finished his NASL career in 1974 playing for the Boston Minutemen. He made a brief and final return to the professional spotlight for the Major Indoor Soccer League's Buffalo Stallions from 1979 to 1980. In 1978, he returned to the NSL to play with the Buffalo Blazers.

== International career ==
Metidieri played in two 'A' internationals for the United States national soccer team in 1973. His first game was a 4–0 loss to Bermuda on March 17. His second was a 4–0 loss to Poland on March 20. He also played an unofficial match, a 6–0 loss to Belgium, on March 29.

== Personal life ==
He is the nephew of the former president of Esporte Clube São Bento and the Football Association of the state of São Paulo, Alfredo Metidieri.

After his retirement from soccer he lived in Rochester, New York where he owned a pizza restaurant. He later moved to Phoenix, Arizona.

He has four children. He now resides in Gilbert, Arizona with his wife and youngest daughter.

== Honors ==
NASL Championship (1)

- 1970

NASL Most Valuable Player (2)

- 1970, 1971

NASL Scoring Champion (2)

- 1970 (14 goals, 7 assists, 35 points) • 1971 (19 goals, 8 assists, 46 points)

NASL Goal Scoring Champion (1)

- 1971 (19 goals)

NASL All-Star First Team selection (2)

- 1970, 1971
