= Syracuse Scorpions =

The Syracuse Scorpions were an American soccer club based in Syracuse, New York and member of the American Soccer League (ASL).

In its inaugural season in 1969, the club reached the playoff final as their star forward, Jim Lefkos, was named the league's most valuable player. The club folded after the 1970 season, but was revived and renamed the Syracuse Suns. The club folded again after the 1971 season, but was revived again before the 1973 season. The team folded 5 games into the 1974 season and forfeited the rest of their games. A new Scorpions team was announced for the 2011-12 MISL season. The team later announced that it would be called the Syracuse Silver Knights.

== Year-by-year ==
Year	Division	League	Reg. season	Playoffs	U.S. Open Cup
1969	2	ASL	1st, Northern	Final	Did not enter
1970	2	ASL	4th	No playoff	Did not enter
1971	2	ASL	4th	No playoff	Did not enter
1972	Franchise dormant				
1973	2	ASL	4th, Northeast	Did not qualify	Did not enter
1974	2	ASL	5th, Midwest	Did not qualify	Did not enter
