= 1967–68 Washington Britannica season =

Washington Britannica
1967 season
- Chairman: William Cousins Jr.
- Manager: Norman Sutherland
- ASL: Southern Division: Second place
Home colors	Away colors

The 1967–68 season of the Washington Britannica was their first season in the American Soccer League, and the club's first season in professional soccer. The club was created in 1963 at the amateur level and fielded a team under the same name. During their initial professional year, the team earned second place in the Southern Division. The following year, the club folded the team and renamed themselves, fielding a new team for the 1968 season, the Washington Darts.

== Competitions ==
=== ASL regular season ===
First Division
Team	Pld	W	D	L	GF	GA	Pts
Ukrainian Nationals	15	10	3	2	36	12	23
Boston Tigers	15	8	0	7	34	26	16
Washington Britannica	15	7	2	6	28	26	16
Rochester Lancers	15	6	2	7	34	31	14
Baltimore Flyers	15	4	3	8	17	35	11
Newark Ukrainian Sitch	15	4	2	9	15	34	10

Premier Division
Team	Pld	W	D	L	GF	GA	Pts
New York Inter	11	7	4	0	36	12	18
Fall River Astros	11	6	3	2	23	13	15
Newark Portuguese	11	5	2	4	24	20	12
Patterson Roma SC	11	3	4	4	27	25	10
Hartford S.C (Note: Hartford S.C requested and were granted a leave of absence for the remainder of season due to financial problems.)	5	2	1	2	9	8	5
N.B. Hungarian Americans	12	1	0	11	19	55	2

Updated to match(es) played on April 20, 1968. Source:
