= 1967 in American soccer =

Soccer in the United States
- Season: 1967

The 1967 season in American soccer was often considered to be the first season in the second professional era of American soccer. It was the 54th season of FIFA-sanctioned soccer in the United States.

== Changes from 1965–66 ==
- In response to high TV ratings for the 1966 FIFA World Cup domestically, National Football League (American football) owners opt to create the National Professional Soccer League, while others create the United Soccer Association. Drastically different from past soccer leagues in the United States, the NPSL and USA are played during the spring seasons.

== Honors and achievements ==
Competition	Winner
NPSL	Oakland Clippers (1)
USA	Los Angeles Wolves (1)
ASL 1966–67	Baltimore St. Gerards (1)
ASL 1967–68	Ukrainian Nationals (4)
National Challenge Cup	New York Greek American (1)

== National team ==
=== Men's ===
Wins	Losses	Draws
0	1	1

May 21 Olympics qualifier	Bermuda	1–1	United States	Hamilton, Bermuda

May 27 Olympics qualifier	United States	0–1	Bermuda	United States

== League tables ==
=== USA ===
==== Eastern Division ====
Pos	Team	Pld	W	D	L	GF	GA	GD	Pts	Qualification
1	Washington Whips	12	5	5	2	19	11	+8	15	1967 USA Championship
2	Cleveland Stokers	12	5	4	3	19	13	+6	14	
3	Toronto City	12	4	5	3	23	17	+6	13	
4	Detroit Cougars	12	3	6	3	11	18	−7	12	
5	New York Skyliners	12	2	6	4	15	17	−2	10	
6	Boston Rovers	12	2	3	7	12	26	−14	7	

Source: American Soccer History Archives
Rules for classification: 1) points; 2) goal difference; 3) number of goals scored.
Note: 2 points for a win, 1 point for a tie, 0 points for a loss

==== Western Division ====
Pos	Team	Pld	W	D	L	GF	GA	GD	Pts	Qualification
1	Los Angeles Wolves (C)	12	5	5	2	21	14	+7	15	1967 USA Championship
2	San Francisco Golden Gate Gales	12	5	3	4	25	19	+6	13	
3	Chicago Mustangs	12	3	7	2	20	14	+6	13	
4	Houston Stars	12	4	4	4	19	18	+1	12	
5	Vancouver Royal Canadians	12	3	5	4	20	28	−8	11	
6	Dallas Tornado	12	3	3	6	14	23	−9	9	

Source: American Soccer History Archives
Rules for classification: 1) points; 2) goal difference; 3) number of goals scored.
Note: 2 points for a win, 1 point for a tie, 0 points for a loss
(C) Champions

== National Challenge Cup ==
Semifinals
New York Greek American	3
Paterson Roma	0
Chicago Kickers	0
Orange County	1

Final
New York Greek American	4
Orange County	2

Source: TheCup.us
