= 1968 Washington Darts season =

Washington Darts
1968 season
- Chairman: William Cousins Jr.
- Manager: Norman Sutherland
- ASL: ASL Championship:Winners
Home colors	Away colors

The 1968 Washington Darts season was the first season of the new team in the American Soccer League, and the club's second season in professional soccer. It is also the first instance in which the club uses this name. Previously, the club was known as the Washington Britannica. This year, the team finished at the top of the table and therefore won the ASL Championship.

== Competitions ==
=== ASL regular season ===
Pos	Team	Pld	W	D	L	GF	GA	Pts
1	Washington Darts	12	10	1	1	36	5	21
2	Rochester Lancers	12	6	1	5	32	20	13
3	Philadelphia Ukrainians	9	6	0	3	24	13	12
4	New York Inter	9	5	1	3	15	11	11
5	Fall River Astros	10	4	0	6	18	20	8
6	Newark Ukrainian Sitch	9	2	1	6	12	20	5
7	Hartford Kings	13	2	0	11	13	60	4
