= 1965–66 American Soccer League =

American Soccer League 1965–66 season
- Season: 1965–66
- Teams: 10
- Champions: Roma SC
- Top goalscorer: Walter Chyzowych (27)

Statistics of American Soccer League II in season 1965–66.

== League standings ==
Pos	Team	Pld	W	D	L	GF	GA	Pts
1	Roma SC	17	15	1	1	62	19	31
2	Newark Ukrainian Sitch	15	13	0	2	47	13	26
3	Ukrainian Nationals	14	11	0	3	62	13	25 (Note: 3 bonus points?)
4	Inter SC	15	9	1	5	32	22	19
5	Hartford S.C.	16	8	3	5	42	36	19
6	Boston Tigers	15	7	3	5	19	17	17
7	Newark Portuguese	17	3	2	12	20	42	8
8	N.B. Hungarian Americans	17	2	2	13	25	53	6
9	Olimpia	18	1	4	13	34	88	6
10	Newark Falcons	14	1	2	11	21	62	4

Source: rsssf.com
