= 1963–64 American Soccer League =

American Soccer League 1963–64 season
- Season: 1963–64
- Teams: 8
- Champions: Ukrainian Nationals (4th title)
- Top goalscorer: Walter Chyzowych (15)

Statistics of American Soccer League II in season 1963–64.

== League standings ==
Pos	Team	Pld	W	D	L	GF	GA	Pts
1	Ukrainian Nationals	14	11	2	1	44	13	24
2	Boston Metros	13	9	3	1	21	7	21
3	Newark Ukrainian Sitch	14	6	4	4	16	17	16
4	Boca Juniors	13	5	3	5	20	13	13
5	New York Hakoah-Americans	13	4	3	6	18	21	11
6	N.B. Hungarian Americans	13	3	3	7	15	26	9
7	Uhrik Truckers	13	3	2	8	17	33	8
8	Falcons-Warsaw	13	1	2	10	13	34	4

Source: rsssf.com
