= American soccer clubs in international competitions =

List of soccer clubs

This is a list of American soccer clubs in international competitions. American clubs have participated in competitive international soccer competitions since 1963, when New York Hungaria entered the 1963 CONCACAF Champions' Cup.

Unlike other major professional sports leagues in the United States, the winners of Major League Soccer and National Women's Soccer League are not universally considered to be world champions in their respective sport. Yearly, MLS and NWSL teams will compete against other soccer clubs abroad in competitions to determine the champions of North America, the Americas, and the world.

Since 1963, American men's soccer clubs have won three CONCACAF Champions' Cup/Champions League titles, and finished runners-up five times. Since 2024, women's clubs have competed in the CONCACAF W Champions Cup. Gotham FC won the inaugural 2024–25 CONCACAF W Champions Cup.

== Qualification for CONCACAF competitions ==
=== Men's clubs ===
For the CONCACAF Champions Cup, up to nine American soccer clubs are eligible for entry into the competition. Starting in 2024, all MLS clubs (United States or Canada based) may qualify through MLS or Leagues Cup.

Competition	Details	Since	Eligible clubs	Ref.
MLS Cup champion	Major League Soccer (Division I) championship	1996	MLS-only	
Supporters' Shield winner	Major League Soccer regular season winner	2006	MLS-only	
Conference regular season winner	MLS Conference regular season champion of conference opposite of Shield winner	2013	MLS-only	
Next best clubs	Two highest-ranked clubs in MLS regular season standings that have not already qualified	2023	MLS-only	
Leagues Cup champion, runner-up, and third-place finisher	Competition between clubs from MLS and Liga MX	2023	MLS-only	
U.S. Open Cup champion	Domestic cup competition	1963	All U.S. clubs	

If one (or more) MLS club(s) were to qualify through multiple methods, then the next MLS club(s) with the most overall table points, regardless of conference, would qualify in the remaining slot(s). If the U.S. Open Cup champion has qualified through multiple methods, then the runner-up would fill the slot; should the runner-up have already qualified, then the next best MLS club in the overall table would earn the slot. If the Leagues Cup champion were to win the MLS Cup, then the MLS Cup runner-up would qualify to the round of 16; should the Leagues Cup slot(s) have already qualified, then MLS would be awarded with one additional slot to be given to the next best non-qualified team in the overall table.

In past competitions, such as the North American SuperLiga (held from 2007 to 2010), the best teams based on regular season record to not qualify for the Champions League participated.

==== Leagues Cup ====
since the 2025 Leagues Cup 18 Major League Soccer clubs that reached MLS Cup playoffs qualified, with exceptions for team who are competing in two other cup competitions.

=== Women's clubs ===
For the CONCACAF W Champions Cup, three American soccer clubs qualify.

Competition	Details	Since	Eligible clubs	ref
National Women's Soccer League playoff champion	National Women's Soccer League (Women's Division 1) championship	2023	NWSL	
National Women's Soccer League Shield winners	National Women's Soccer League regular season winners	2023	NWSL	
National Women's Soccer League Shield runners-up	NWSL that finished second in regular season	2023	NWSL	

== Cups and finals ==
=== Men's Competitive tournaments ===
==== CONCACAF Champions' Cup / Champions League ====
Team	Winners	Runners-up	Years won	Years runner-up
LA Galaxy	1	1	2000	1997
D.C. United	1	0	1998	
Seattle Sounders FC	1	0	2022	
Los Angeles FC	0	2		2020, 2023
New York Pancyprian-Freedoms	0	1		1984
Real Salt Lake	0	1		2011
Columbus Crew	0	1		2024

==== North American SuperLiga (defunct) ====
Team	Winners	Runners-up	Years won	Years runner-up
New England Revolution	1	1	2008	2010
Houston Dynamo	0	1		2008
LA Galaxy	0	1		2007
Chicago Fire	0	1		2009

==== CONCACAF Cup Winners Cup / Giants Cup (defunct) ====
Team	Winners	Runners-up	Years won	Years runner-up
D.C. United	0	1		2001

==== Copa Interamericana (defunct) ====
Team	Winners	Runners-up	Years won	Years runner-up
D.C. United	1	0	1998	

==== Leagues Cup ====
Team	Winners	Runners-up	Years won	Years runner-up
Inter Miami CF	1	1	2023	2025
Seattle Sounders FC	1	1	2025	2021
Columbus Crew	1	0	2024	
Nashville SC	0	1		2023
Los Angeles FC	0	1		2024

=== FIFA Club World Championship / Club World Cup ===
No American club has reached the final of the FIFA Club World Cup or the FIFA Intercontinental Cup. The furthest a club has reached is the round of 16 by Inter Miami CF in the 2025 edition. The only two clubs from CONCACAF that have reached the final are Tigres UANL in 2020, and Pachuca in 2024.

=== Friendly tournaments ===
==== Emirates Cup ====
Team	Winners	Runners-up	Years won	Years runner-up
New York Red Bulls	1	0	2011	

==== International Champions Cup ====
Team	Winners	Runners-up	Years won	Years runner-up
New York Red Bulls	0	1		2015

==== La Manga Cup (defunct) ====
Team	Winners	Runners-up	Years won	Years runner-up
MetroStars	1	0	2004	

==== Pan-Pacific Championship (defunct) ====
Team	Winners	Runners-up	Years won	Years runner-up
Houston Dynamo	0	1		2008
LA Galaxy	0	1		2009

=== Women's tournaments ===
==== CONCACAF W Champions Cup ====
Team	Winners	Runners-up	Years won	Years runner-up
Gotham FC	1	0	2024–25	
Washington Spirit	0	1		2025–26

==== NWSL x Liga MX Femenil Summer Cup(defunct) ====
Team	Winners	Runners-up	Years won	Years runner-up
Kansas City Current	1	0	2024	
NJ/NY Gotham FC	0	1		2024

== Full international record ==
Competitive tournaments only.

=== FIFA Club World Championship / Club World Cup ===
Year	Team	Progress	Result	Opponents
2001	LA Galaxy	Group stage	Canceled	(Ghana) Hearts of Oak, (Japan) Júbilo Iwata, (Spain) Real Madrid
2022	Seattle Sounders FC	Second round	0–1	(Egypt) Al Ahly
2025	Inter Miami CF	Round of 16	0–4	(France) Paris Saint-Germain
2025	Seattle Sounders FC	4th in group stage	—N/a	(Spain) Atlético Madrid, (Brazil) Botafogo, (France) Paris Saint-Germain
2025	Los Angeles FC	4th in group stage	—N/a	(England) Chelsea, (Tunisia) Espérance de Tunis, (Brazil) Flamengo

=== Copa Interamericana (defunct) ===
Year	Team	Progress	Aggregate	Opponents	Results
1998	D.C. United	Winners	2–1	(Brazil) Vasco da Gama	0–1 at home, 2–0 away

=== CONCACAF Champions' Cup / Champions League ===
The competition was named CONCACAF Champions' Cup until 2008 and CONCACAF Champions League until 2024, when it was renamed back to CONCACAF Champions Cup.

Year	Team	Progress	Aggregate	Opponents	Results
1962	None entered				
1963	New York Hungaria	Second round	0–2	(Mexico) Guadalajara	2–4 at home, 0–4 away
1967	Philadelphia Ukrainians	Semi-finals	1–3	(El Salvador) Alianza	1–2 at home, 0–1 away
1968	New York Greek American	Second round	3–7	(Mexico) Toluca	2–3 at home, 1–4 away
1970	New York Greek American	First round	0–6	(Mexico) Cruz Azul	0–1 at home, 0–5 away
1971	Elizabeth	First round	0–2	(Mexico) Cruz Azul	0–0 at home, 0–2 away
1971	Rochester Lancers	4th in final round	—N/a	(Costa Rica) Alajuelense, (Guatemala) Comunicaciones, (Mexico) Cruz Azul, (Netherlands Antilles) Estrella, (Suriname) Transvaal	
1972	None entered				
1973	None entered				
1974	Maccabi Los Angeles	First round	—N/a	(Bermuda) Devonshire Colts, (Bermuda) North Village Rams (withdrew)	
1975	None entered				
1976	New York Inter-Giuliana	First round	3–5	(Canada) Toronto Italia	1–2 at home, 2–3 away
1977	New York Inter-Giuliana	First round	—N/a	(Mexico) América	Withdrew
1978	Maccabi Los Angeles	First round	—N/a	(Mexico) UNAM	Withdrew
1979	Soccer Universidad A.C.	First round	0–3	(Mexico) UANL	0–2 at home, 0–1 away
1980	Sacramento Gold	First round	0–3	(Mexico) UNAM	0–1 at home, 0–2 away
1980	Brooklyn Italians	Second round	3–12	(Mexico) UNAM	2–3 at home, 0–9 away
1981	None entered				
1982	New York Pancyprian-Freedoms	First round	—N/a	(Mexico) UNAM	Withdrew
1982	Brooklyn Italians	First round	—N/a	(Honduras) Vida	Withdrew
1983	Detroit Express	First round	—N/a	(El Salvador) Independiente	Withdrew
1983	New York Pancyprian-Freedoms	Second round	3–4	(Mexico) Atlante	1–1 at home, 2–3 away
1984	Jacksonville Tea Men	First round	—N/a	(Honduras) Vida	Withdrew
1984	New York Pancyprian-Freedoms	Final	—N/a	(Haiti) Violette	Withdrew along with (Mexico) Guadalajara
1985	Chicago Croatian	First round	0–6	(Honduras) Olimpia	0–4 at home, 0–2 away
1986	New York Greek American	First round	0–2	(Bermuda) PHC Zebras	0–1 at home, 0–1 away
1987	St. Louis Kutis	First round	0–4	(Mexico) Monterrey	0–1 at home, 0–3 away
1987	San Pedro Yugoslavs	First round	0–4	(Mexico) América	0–2 at home, 0–2 away
1988	Seattle Mitre Eagles	First round	0–9	(Mexico) Cruz Azul	0–0 at home, 0–9 away
1988	Washington Diplomats	First round	2–4	(Mexico) Morelia	1–2 at home, 1–2 away
1989	San Francisco Greek-American	First round	2–6	(Mexico) UNAM	1–1 at home, 1–5 away
1989	St. Louis Busch	First round	2–9	(Mexico) U de G	2–1 at home, 0–8 away
1990	New York Greek American	First round	1–2	(United States) St. Petersburg Kickers	1–0 at home, 0–2 away
1990	St. Petersburg Kickers	Second round	0–1	(Mexico) América	0–0 at home, 0–1 away
1991	A.A.C. Eagles	First round	1–4	(Bermuda) PHC Zebras	1–2 at home, 0–2 away
1991	Brooklyn Italians	Second round	1–6	(Mexico) U de G	1–3 at home, 0–3 away
1992	Dallas Rockets	Round of 16	2–7	(Mexico) América	1–2 at home, 1–5 away
1992	San Francisco Bay Blackhawks	Quarter-finals	3–4	(Mexico) América	2–1 at home, 1–3 away
1993	Hercules	First round	0–4	(Belize) Juventus	0–2 at home, 0–2 away
1994	Los Angeles Salsa	First round	2–3	(El Salvador) Alianza	2–2 at home, 0–1 away
1995	None entered				
1996	Seattle Sounders	4th in final round	—N/a	(Mexico) Cruz Azul, (Guatemala) Comunicaciones, (Mexico) Necaxa	
1997	D.C. United	Consolation match	2–2	(Mexico) Guadalajara	
1997	LA Galaxy	Final	3–5	(Mexico) Cruz Azul	
1998	Colorado Rapids	Play-in round	3–4	(Mexico) Santos Laguna	1–0 at home, 2–4 away
1998	D.C. United	Winners	1–0	(Mexico) Toluca	
1999	Chicago Fire	Consolation match	2–2	(United States) D.C. United	
1999	D.C. United	Consolation match	2–2	(United States) Chicago Fire	
1999	LA Galaxy	Play-in round	1–1 (4–5 p)	(Mexico) Necaxa	
2000	D.C. United	Consolation match	1–2	(Mexico) Pachuca	
2000	LA Galaxy	Winners	3–2	(Honduras) Olimpia	
2002	Chicago Fire	Quarter-finals	2–3	(Mexico) Morelia	2–1 at home, 0–2 away
2002	D.C. United	Round of 16	2–5	(Guatemala) Comunicaciones	2–1 at home, 0–4 away
2002	Kansas City Wizards	Semi-finals	2–7	(Mexico) Morelia	1–1 at home, 1–6 away
2002	San Jose Earthquakes	Quarter-finals	1–3	(Mexico) Pachuca	1–0 at home, 0–3 away
2003	Columbus Crew	Quarter-finals	2–6	(Mexico) Morelia	2–0 at home, 0–6 away
2003	LA Galaxy	Quarter-finals	2–6	(Mexico) Necaxa	1–2 at home, 1–4 away
2003	New England Revolution	Round of 16	3–5	(Costa Rica) Alajuelense	3–1 at home, 0–4 away
2003	San Jose Earthquakes	Round of 16	4–5	(Guatemala) Municipal	2–1 at home, 2–4 away
2004	Chicago Fire	Semi-finals	2–3	(Costa Rica) Saprissa	2–1 at home, 0–2 away
2004	San Jose Earthquakes	Quarter-finals	1–3	(Costa Rica) Alajuelense	1–0 at home, 0–3 away
2005	D.C. United	Semi-finals	1–6	(Mexico) UNAM	1–1 at home, 0–5 away
2005	Kansas City Wizards	Quarter-finals	1–2	(Costa Rica) Saprissa	0–0 at home, 1–2 away
2006	LA Galaxy	Quarter-finals	2–3	(Costa Rica) Saprissa	0–0 at home, 2–3 away
2006	New England Revolution	Quarter-finals	0–1	(Costa Rica) Alajuelense	0–0 at home, 0–1 away
2007	D.C. United	Semi-finals	2–3	(Mexico) Guadalajara	1–1 at home, 1–2 away
2007	Houston Dynamo	Semi-finals	4–5	(Mexico) Pachuca	2–0 at home, 2–5 away
2008	D.C. United	Semi-finals	1–6	(Mexico) Pachuca	1–1 at home, 0–5 away
2008	Houston Dynamo	Semi-finals	0–3	(Costa Rica) Saprissa	0–0 at home, 0–3 away
2008–09	Chivas USA	Preliminary round	1–3	(Panama) Tauro	1–1 at home, 0–2 away
2008–09	D.C. United	4th in group stage	—N/a	(Mexico) Cruz Azul, (Honduras) Marathón, (Costa Rica) Saprissa	
2008–09	Houston Dynamo	Quarter-finals	1–4	(Mexico) Atlante	1–1 at home, 0–3 away
2008–09	New England Revolution	Preliminary round	1–6	(Trinidad and Tobago) Joe Public	0–4 at home, 1–2 away
2009–10	Columbus Crew	Quarter-finals	4–5	(Mexico) Toluca	2–2 at home, 2–3 away
2009–10	D.C. United	3rd in group stage	—N/a	(Honduras) Marathón, (Trinidad and Tobago) San Juan Jabloteh, (Mexico) Toluca	
2009–10	Houston Dynamo	3rd in group stage	—N/a	(Panama) Árabe Unido, (El Salvador) Isidro Metapán, (Mexico) Pachuca	
2009–10	New York Red Bulls	Preliminary round	3–4	(Trinidad and Tobago) W Connection	1–2 at home, 2–2 away
2010–11	Columbus Crew	Quarter-finals	1–4	(United States) Real Salt Lake	0–0 at home, 1–4 away
2010–11	LA Galaxy	Preliminary round	3–5	Puerto Rico Islanders	1–4 at home, 2–1 away
2010–11	Real Salt Lake	Final	2–3	(Mexico) Monterrey	0–1 at home, 2–2 away
2010–11	Seattle Sounders FC	4th in group stage	—N/a	(Honduras) Marathón, (Mexico) Monterrey, (Costa Rica) Saprissa	
2011–12	Colorado Rapids	3rd in group stage	—N/a	(El Salvador) Isidro Metapán, (Honduras) Real España, (Mexico) Santos Laguna	
2011–12	LA Galaxy	Quarter-finals	3–4	(Canada) Toronto FC	1–2 at home, 2–2 away
2011–12	FC Dallas	3rd in group stage	—N/a	(Panama) Tauro, (Canada) Toronto FC, (Mexico) UNAM	
2011–12	Seattle Sounders FC	Quarter-finals	3–7	(Mexico) Santos Laguna	2–1 at home, 1–6 away
2012–13	LA Galaxy	Semi-finals	1–3	(Mexico) Monterrey	0–1 at home, 1–2 away
2012–13	Houston Dynamo	Quarter-finals	1–3	(Mexico) Santos Laguna	1–0 at home, 0–3 away
2012–13	Real Salt Lake	2nd in group stage	—N/a	(Costa Rica) Herediano, (Panama) Tauro	
2012–13	Seattle Sounders FC	Semi-finals	1–2	(Mexico) Santos Laguna	0–1 at home, 1–1 away
2013–14	Houston Dynamo	2nd in group stage	—N/a	(Panama) Árabe Unido, (Trinidad and Tobago) W Connection	
2013–14	LA Galaxy	Quarter-finals	3–4	(Mexico) Tijuana	1–0 at home, 2–4 away
2013–14	San Jose Earthquakes	Quarter-finals	2–2 (4–5 p)	(Mexico) Toluca	1–1 at home, 1–1 away
2013–14	Sporting Kansas City	Quarter-finals	2–5	(Mexico) Cruz Azul	1–0 at home, 1–5 away
2014–15	D.C. United	Quarter-finals	4–6	(Costa Rica) Alajuelense	2–1 at home, 2–5 away
2014–15	New York Red Bulls	2nd in group stage	—N/a	(Canada) Montreal Impact, (El Salvador) FAS	
2014–15	Portland Timbers	2nd in group stage	—N/a	(Guyana) Alpha United, (Honduras) Olimpia	
2014–15	Sporting Kansas City	2nd in group stage	—N/a	(Nicaragua) Real Estelí, (Costa Rica) Saprissa	
2015–16	D.C. United	Quarter-finals	1–3	(Mexico) Querétaro	1–1 at home, 0–2 away
2015–16	LA Galaxy	Quarter-finals	0–4	(Mexico) Santos Laguna	0–0 at home, 0–4 away
2015–16	Real Salt Lake	Quarter-finals	1–3	(Mexico) UANL	1–1 at home, 0–2 away
2015–16	Seattle Sounders FC	Quarter-finals	3–5	(Mexico) América	2–2 at home, 1–3 away
2016–17	FC Dallas	Semi-finals	3–4	(Mexico) Pachuca	2–1 at home, 1–3 away
2016–17	New York Red Bulls	Quarter-finals	1–3	(Canada) Vancouver Whitecaps FC	1–1 at home, 0–2 away
2016–17	Portland Timbers	2nd in group stage	—N/a	(El Salvador) Dragón, (Costa Rica) Saprissa	
2016–17	Sporting Kansas City	2nd in group stage	—N/a	(Trinidad and Tobago) Central, (Canada) Vancouver Whitecaps FC	
2018	Colorado Rapids	Round of 16	0–2	(Canada) Toronto FC	0–2 at home, 0–0 away
2018	FC Dallas	Round of 16	3–3 (a)	(Panama) Tauro	3–2 at home, 0–1 away
2018	New York Red Bulls	Semi-finals	0–1	(Mexico) Guadalajara	0–0 at home, 0–1 away
2018	Seattle Sounders FC	Quarter-finals	1–3	(Mexico) Guadalajara	1–0 at home, 0–3 away
2019	Atlanta United FC	Quarter-finals	1–3	(Mexico) Monterrey	1–0 at home, 0–3 away
2019	Houston Dynamo	Quarter-finals	0–3	(Mexico) UANL	0–2 at home, 0–1 away
2019	New York Red Bulls	Quarter-finals	2–6	(Mexico) Santos Laguna	0–2 at home, 2–4 away
2019	Sporting Kansas City	Semi-finals	2–10	(Mexico) Monterrey	2–5 at home, 0–5 away
2020	Atlanta United FC	Quarter-finals	1–3	(Mexico) América	1–0 at home, 0–3 away
2020	Los Angeles FC	Final	1–2	(Mexico) UANL	
2020	New York City FC	Quarter-finals	0–5	(Mexico) UANL	0–1 at home, 0–4 away
2020	Seattle Sounders FC	Round of 16	4–4 (2–4 p)	(Honduras) Olimpia	2–2 at home, 2–2 away
2021	Atlanta United FC	Quarter-finals	1–4	(United States) Philadelphia Union	0–3 at home, 1–1 away
2021	Columbus Crew	Quarter-finals	2–5	(Mexico) Monterrey	2–2 at home, 0–3 away
2021	Philadelphia Union	Semi-finals	0–4	(Mexico) América	0–2 at home, 0–2 away
2021	Portland Timbers	Quarter-finals	2–4	(Mexico) América	1–1 at home, 1–3 away
2022	Colorado Rapids	Round of 16	1–1 (3–4 p)	(Guatemala) Comunicaciones	1–0 at home, 0–1 away
2022	New England Revolution	Quarter-finals	3–3 (3–4 p)	(Mexico) UNAM	3–0 at home, 0–3 away
2022	New York City FC	Semi-finals	2–4	(United States) Seattle Sounders FC	1–1 at home, 1–3 away
2022	Seattle Sounders FC	Winners	5–2	(Mexico) UNAM	3–0 at home, 2–2 away
2023	Austin FC	Round of 16	2–3	(Haiti) Violette	2–0 at home, 0–3 away
2023	Los Angeles FC	Final	1–3	(Mexico) León	0–1 at home, 1–2 away
2023	Orlando City SC	Round of 16	1–1 (a)	(Mexico) UANL	1–1 at home, 0–0 away
2023	Philadelphia Union	Semi-finals	1–4	(United States) Los Angeles FC	1–1 at home, 0–3 away
2024	FC Cincinnati	Round of 16	1–3	(Mexico) Monterrey	0–1 at home, 1–2 away
2024	Columbus Crew	Final	0–3	(Mexico) Pachuca	
2024	Houston Dynamo	Round of 16	1–2	(United States) Columbus Crew	0–1 at home, 1–1 away
2024	Inter Miami CF	Quarter-finals	2–5	(Mexico) Monterrey	1–2 at home, 1–3 away
2024	Nashville SC	Round of 16	3–5	(United States) Inter Miami CF	2–2 at home, 1–3 away
2024	New England Revolution	Quarter-finals	2–9	(Mexico) América	0–4 at home, 2–5 away
2024	Orlando City SC	Round of 16	2–4	(Mexico) UANL	0–0 at home, 2–4 away
2024	Philadelphia Union	Round of 16	0–6	(Mexico) Pachuca	0–0 at home, 0–6 away
2024	St. Louis City SC	Round one	2–2 (a)	(United States) Houston Dynamo	2–1 at home, 0–1 away
2025	FC Cincinnati	Round of 16	2–4	(Mexico) UANL	1–1 at home, 1–3 away
2025	Colorado Rapids	Round one	2–2 (a)	(United States) Los Angeles FC	2–1 at home, 0–1 away
2025	Columbus Crew	Round of 16	2–4	(United States) Los Angeles FC	2–1 at home, 0–3 away
2025	Inter Miami CF	Semi-finals	1–5	(Canada) Vancouver Whitecaps FC	1–3 at home, 0–2 away
2025	LA Galaxy	Quarter-finals	2–3	(Mexico) UANL	0–0 at home, 2–3 away
2025	Los Angeles FC	Quarter-finals	2–3	(United States) Inter Miami CF	1–0 at home, 1–3 away
2025	Real Salt Lake	Round one	1–2	(Costa Rica) Herediano	1–2 at home, 0–0 away
2025	Seattle Sounders FC	Round of 16	1–4	(Mexico) Cruz Azul	0–0 at home, 1–4 away
2025	Sporting Kansas City	Round one	1–4	(United States) Inter Miami CF	0–1 at home, 1–3 away
2026	FC Cincinnati	Round of 16	4–5	(Mexico) UANL	3–0 at home, 1–5 away
2026	Inter Miami CF	Round of 16	1–1 (a)	(United States) Nashville SC	1–1 at home, 0–0 away
2026	Los Angeles FC	Semi-finals	2–5	(Mexico) Toluca	2–1 at home, 0–4 away
2026	LA Galaxy	Quarter-finals	2–7	(Mexico) Toluca	0–3 at home, 2–4 away
2026	Nashville SC	Semi-finals	0–2	(Mexico) UANL	0–1 at home, 0–1 away
2026	Philadelphia Union	Round of 16	1–2	(Mexico) América	0–1 at home, 1–1 away
2026	San Diego FC	Round of 16	3–6	(Mexico) Toluca	3–2 at home, 0–4 away
2026	Seattle Sounders FC	Quarter-finals	3–3 (a)	(Mexico) UANL	3–1 at home, 0–2 away

=== North American SuperLiga (defunct) ===
Year	Team	Progress	Result	Opponent(s)
2007	D.C. United	Semi-finals	0–2	(United States) LA Galaxy
2007	FC Dallas	4th in group stage	—N/a	(Mexico) Guadalajara, (United States) LA Galaxy, (Mexico) Pachuca
2007	Houston Dynamo	Semi-finals	2–2 (3–4 p)	(Mexico) Pachuca
2007	LA Galaxy	Final	1–1 (3–4 p)	(Mexico) Pachuca
2008	Chivas USA	3rd in group stage	—N/a	(United States) New England Revolution, (Mexico) Pachuca, (Mexico) Santos Laguna
2008	D.C. United	4th in group stage	—N/a	(Mexico) Atlante, (Mexico) Guadalajara, (United States) Houston Dynamo
2008	Houston Dynamo	Final	2–2 (5–6 p)	(United States) New England Revolution
2008	New England Revolution	Winners	2–2 (6–5 p)	(United States) Houston Dynamo
2009	Chicago Fire	Final	1–1 (3–4 p)	(Mexico) UANL
2009	Chivas USA	4th in group stage	—N/a	(United States) Chicago Fire, (Mexico) San Luis, (Mexico) UANL
2009	Kansas City Wizards	4th in group stage	—N/a	(Mexico) Atlas, (United States) New England Revolution, (Mexico) Santos Laguna
2009	New England Revolution	Semi-finals	1–2	(United States) Chicago Fire
2010	Chicago Fire	3rd in group stage	—N/a	(Mexico) Morelia, (United States) New England Revolution, (Mexico) UNAM
2010	Chivas USA	3rd in group stage	—N/a	(United States) Houston Dynamo, (Mexico) Pachuca, (Mexico) Puebla
2010	Houston Dynamo	Semi-finals	0–1	(Mexico) Morelia
2010	New England Revolution	Final	1–2	(Mexico) Morelia

=== CONCACAF Cup Winners Cup / Giants Cup (defunct) ===
Year	Team	Progress	Aggregate	Opponents	Results
1991	Brooklyn Italians	First round	1–6	(Mexico) U de G	0–3 at home, 1–3 away
1994	El Farolito	Quarter-finals	1–5	(Mexico) Necaxa	0–0 at home, 1–5 away
1995	New York Greek American	First round	—N/a	(Mexico) Tecos	Withdrew
1996	Richmond Kickers	Second round	—N/a	(Guadeloupe) Siroco	Canceled
1997	Dallas Burn	3rd in group stage	—N/a	(Mexico) Cruz Azul, (Mexico) Necaxa	
2001	Columbus Crew	Quarter-finals	1–3	(Costa Rica) Saprissa	1–1 at home, 0–2 away
2001	D.C. United	Final	0–2	(Mexico) América	

=== Campeones Cup ===
Year	Team	Result	Opponents
2019	Atlanta United FC	3–2	(Mexico) América
2020	Seattle Sounders FC	Canceled	—
2021	Columbus Crew	2–0	(Mexico) Cruz Azul
2022	New York City FC	2–0	(Mexico) Atlas
2023	Los Angeles FC	0–0 (2–4 p)	(Mexico) UANL
2024	Columbus Crew	1–1 (4–5 p)	(Mexico) América
2025	LA Galaxy	2–3	(Mexico) Toluca
2026	Inter Miami CF	2–0	(Mexico) Cruz Azul

=== Leagues Cup ===
From 2023 on, only the quarter-finals onwards are included.

Year	Team	Progress	Result	Opponents
2019	Chicago Fire	Quarter-finals	0–2	(Mexico) Cruz Azul
2019	Houston Dynamo	Quarter-finals	1–1 (5–6 p)	(Mexico) América
2019	LA Galaxy	Semi-finals	1–2	(Mexico) Cruz Azul
2019	Real Salt Lake	Quarter-finals	0–1	(Mexico) UANL
2020	Cancelled due to COVID-19 Pandemic			
2021	New York City FC	Quarter-finals	1–1 (2–3 p)	(Mexico) UNAM
2021	Orlando City SC	Quarter-finals	0–1	(Mexico) Santos Laguna
2021	Seattle Sounders FC	Final	2–3	(Mexico) León
2021	Sporting Kansas City	Quarter-finals	1–6	(Mexico) León
2022	Leagues Cup Showcase			
2023	Charlotte FC	Quarter-finals	0–4	(United States) Inter Miami FC
2023	Inter Miami FC	Winners	1–1 (10–9 p)	(United States) Nashville SC
2023	Los Angeles FC	Quarter-finals	2–3	(Mexico) Monterrey
2023	Minnesota United FC	Quarter-finals	0–5	(United States) Nashville SC
2023	Nashville SC	Final	1–1 (9–10 p)	(United States) Inter Miami FC
2023	Philadelphia Union	3rd	3–0	(Mexico) Monterrey
2024	Colorado Rapids	3rd	2–2 (3–1 p)	(United States) Philadelphia Union
2024	Columbus Crew	Winners	3–1	(United States) Los Angeles FC
2024	Los Angeles FC	Final	1–3	(United States) Columbus Crew
2024	New York City FC	Quarter-finals	1–1 (3–4 p)	(United States) Columbus Crew
2024	Philadelphia Union	4th	2–2 (1–3 p)	(United States) Colorado Rapids
2024	Seattle Sounders FC	Quarter-finals	0–3	(United States) Los Angeles FC
2025	LA Galaxy	3rd	2–1	(United States) Orlando City SC
2025	Inter Miami CF	Final	0–3	(United States) Seattle Sounders FC
2025	Orlando City SC	4th	1–2	(United States) LA Galaxy
2025	Seattle Sounders FC	Winners	3–0	(United States) Inter Miami CF
2026	Austin FC	Quarter-finals	0–2	(Mexico) Toluca
2026	Chicago Fire FC	Quarter-finals	1–2	(Mexico) Monterrey
2026	Columbus Crew	Quarter-finals	0–2	(Mexico) América
2026	Real Salt Lake	Quarter-finals	0–3	(Mexico) León

=== Copa Sudamericana ===
Year	Team	Progress	Aggregate	Opponents	Results
2005	D.C. United	Round of 16	3–4	(Chile) Universidad Católica	1–1 at home, 2–3 away
2007	D.C. United	Round of 16	2–2 (a)	(Mexico) Guadalajara	2–1 at home, 0–1 away

=== Copa Merconorte (defunct) ===
Year	Team	Progress	Aggregate	Opponents	Results
2001	Kansas City Wizards	3rd in group stage	—N/a	(Ecuador) Barcelona, (Mexico) Santos Laguna, (Peru) Sporting Cristal	
2001	MetroStars	3rd in group stage	—N/a	(Venezuela) Deportivo Italchacao, (Mexico) Guadalajara, (Colombia) Millonarios	

=== CONCACAF W Champions Cup ===
Year	Team	Progress	Score	Opponent(s)
2024–25	Gotham FC	Winners	1–0	(Mexico) UANL
2024–25	San Diego Wave FC	3rd in group stage	—N/a	(Mexico) América, (United States) Portland Thorns FC, (Canada) Whitecaps FC Girls Elite, (Panama) Santa Fe
2024–25	Portland Thorns FC	Third place	3–0	(Mexico) América
2025–26	Orlando Pride	3rd in group stage	—N/a	(Mexico) América, (Mexico) Pachuca, (Costa Rica) Alajuelense, (Panama) Chorrillo
2025–26	Washington Spirit	Final	3–5	(Mexico) América
2025–26	Gotham FC	4th	0–3	(Mexico) Pachuca

=== FIFA Women's Champions Cup ===
Year	Team	Progress	Score	Opponent(s)
2026	Gotham FC	Third place	4–0	(Morocco) AS FAR

=== FIFA Women's Club World Cup ===
Year	Team	Progress	Score	Opponent(s)
2028	Gotham FC	Group stage		

== Appearances in CONCACAF competitions ==
=== Men's clubs ===
As of March 11, 2021.

Club	Total Stats						CL	SL	GC	CWC	Other	First Appearance	Last Appearance
Club	Apps	Pld	W	D	L	Win%	CL	SL	GC	CWC	Other	First Appearance	Last Appearance
A.A.C. Eagles	1	2	0	0	2	.000	1	0	0	0	0	1991 CONCACAF Champions' Cup	
Atlanta United FC	3	9	6	1	3	.650	2	0	0	0	1	2019 CONCACAF Champions League	2021 CONCACAF Champions League
Brooklyn Italians	4	10	2	1	7	.250	3	0	1	0	0	1980 CONCACAF Champions' Cup	1991 CONCACAF Cup Winners Cup
Chicago Croatian	1	2	0	0	2	.000	1	0	0	0	0	1985 CONCACAF Champions' Cup	
Chicago Fire	6	20	10	3	7	.575	3	2	0	0	1	1999 CONCACAF Champions' Cup	2019 Leagues Cup
Chivas USA	4	11	2	4	5	.364	1	3	0	0	0	2008 North American SuperLiga	2010 North American SuperLiga
Colorado Rapids	5	12	4	2	6	.417	4	0	0	0	1	1998 CONCACAF Champions' Cup	2022 CONCACAF Champions League
Columbus Crew	5	22	8	5	9	.477	4	0	1	0	0	2001 CONCACAF Giants Cup	2021 CONCACAF Champions League
Dallas Rockets	1	8	5	1	2	.688	1	0	0	0	0	1992 CONCACAF Champions' Cup	
D.C. United	17	62	26	13	23	.524	12	2	1	0	2	1997 CONCACAF Champions' Cup	2020 Leagues Cup
Detroit Express	1	2	0	0	2	.000	1	0	0	0	0	1983 CONCACAF Champions' Cup	
El Farolito	1	1	0	0	1	.000	0	0	1	0	0	1994 CONCACAF Cup Winners Cup	
Elizabeth	1	2	0	1	1	.250	1	0	0	0	0	1971 CONCACAF Champions' Cup	
FC Dallas	5	23	9	5	9	.500	3	1	1	0	0	1997 CONCACAF Cup Winners Cup	2018 CONCACAF Champions League
Hercules	1	2	0	0	2	.000	1	0	0	0	0	1993 CONCACAF Champions' Cup	
Houston Dynamo	11	41	16	12	13	.537	7	3	0	0	1	2007 CONCACAF Champions' Cup	2019 Leagues Cup
Jacksonville Tea Men	1	2	0	0	2	.000	1	0	0	0	0	1984 CONCACAF Champions' Cup	
LA Galaxy	13	52	24	14	14	.596	10	1	0	1	1	1997 CONCACAF Champions' Cup	2019 Leagues Cup
Los Angeles FC	1	5	3	0	2	.600	1	0	0	0	0	2020 CONCACAF Champions League	
Los Angeles Salsa	1	2	0	1	1	.250	1	0	0	0	0	1994 CONCACAF Champions' Cup	
Maccabi Los Angeles	2	4	0	2	2	.250	2	0	0	0	0	1974 CONCACAF Champions' Cup	1978 CONCACAF Champions' Cup
New England Revolution	6	20	9	5	6	.575	3	3	0	0	0	2003 CONCACAF Champions' Cup	2010 North American SuperLiga
New York City FC	2	4	2	0	2	.500	1	0	0	0	1	2020 CONCACAF Champions League	2021 Leagues Cup
New York Greek American	5	13	3	0	10	.231	4	0	1	0	0	1968 CONCACAF Champions' Cup	1995 CONCACAF Cup Winners Cup
New York Hungaria	1	4	1	2	1	.500	1	0	0	0	0	1963 CONCACAF Champions' Cup	
New York Inter-Giuliana	2	4	0	0	4	.000	2	0	0	0	0	1976 CONCACAF Champions' Cup	1977 CONCACAF Champions' Cup
New York Pancyprian-Freedoms	3	16	4	7	5	.469	3	0	0	0	0	1982 CONCACAF Champions' Cup	1984 CONCACAF Champions' Cup
New York Red Bulls	7	27	11	7	9	.537	5	0	0	0	2	2001 Copa Merconorte	2019 CONCACAF Champions League
Orlando City SC	1	0	0	0	0	–	0	0	0	0	1	2021 Leagues Cup	
Philadelphia Ukrainians	1	2	0	0	2	.000	1	0	0	0	0	1967 CONCACAF Champions' Cup	
Philadelphia Union	1	1	1	0	0	1.000	1	0	0	0	0	2021 CONCACAF Champions League	
Portland Timbers	3	9	5	2	2	.667	3	0	0	0	0	2014–15 CONCACAF Champions League	2021 CONCACAF Champions League
Real Salt Lake	4	23	11	6	6	.609	3	0	0	0	1	2010–11 CONCACAF Champions League	2019 Leagues Cup
Richmond Kickers	1	4	2	2	0	.750	0	0	1	0	0	1996 CONCACAF Cup Winners Cup	
Rochester Lancers	1	7	3	2	2	.571	1	0	0	0	0	1971 CONCACAF Champions' Cup	
Sacramento Gold	1	2	0	0	2	.000	1	0	0	0	0	1980 CONCACAF Champions' Cup	
San Francisco Bay Blackhawks	1	6	5	0	1	.833	1	0	0	0	0	1992 CONCACAF Champions' Cup	
San Francisco Greek-American	1	2	0	1	1	.250	1	0	0	0	0	1989 CONCACAF Champions' Cup	
San Jose Earthquakes	4	14	7	2	5	.571	4	0	0	0	0	2002 CONCACAF Champions' Cup	2013–14 CONCACAF Champions League
San Pedro Yugoslavs	1	2	0	0	2	.000	1	0	0	0	0	1987 CONCACAF Champions' Cup	
Seattle Mitre Eagles	1	2	0	1	1	.250	1	0	0	0	0	1988 CONCACAF Champions' Cup	
Seattle Sounders FC	8	38	17	6	15	.526	7	0	0	1	1	1996 CONCACAF Champions' Cup	2022 CONCACAF Champions League
Soccer Universidad	1	2	0	0	2	.000	1	0	0	0	0	1979 CONCACAF Champions' Cup	
St. Louis Busch	1	2	1	0	1	.500	1	0	0	0	0	1989 CONCACAF Champions' Cup	
St. Louis Kutis	1	2	0	0	2	.000	1	0	0	0	0	1987 CONCACAF Champions' Cup	
St. Petersburg Kickers	1	3	1	0	2	.333	1	0	0	0	0	1990 CONCACAF Champions' Cup	
Sporting Kansas City	9	38	14	8	16	.474	6	1	0	0	2	2001 Copa Merconorte	2021 Leagues Cup
Washington Diplomats	1	2	0	0	2	.000	1	0	0	0	0	1988 CONCACAF Champions' Cup	
Total	155	539	209	115	215	.494	114	16	7	1	17		

=== Women's clubs ===
As of May 23, 2026.

Club	Total Stats						CC	CWC	Other	First Appearance	Last Appearance
Club	Apps	Pld	W	D	L	Win%	CC	CWC	Other	First Appearance	Last Appearance
Washington Spirit	1	6	4	1	1	.750	1	0	0	2025–26 CONCACAF W Champions Cup	
San Diego Wave FC	1	4	3	0	1	.750	1	0	0	2024–25 CONCACAF W Champions Cup	
Gotham FC	2	11	7	3	2	.667	2	0	1	2024–25 CONCACAF W Champions Cup	2025–26 CONCACAF W Champions Cup
Portland Thorns FC	1	6	4	0	2	.667	1	0	0	2024–25 CONCACAF W Champions Cup	
Orlando Pride	1	4	2	1	1	.625	1	0	0	2025–26 CONCACAF W Champions Cup	

== Summer Olympics ==
Year	Team	Round	Progress
1904	Christian Brothers College	Group stage	Runner-up
1904	St. Rose Parish	Group stage	Third place

== Notes ==
1. For statistical purposes if a team withdrew or forfeited a match, each match that was withdrawn or forfeited is counted as a loss. Double forfeits are counted as a draw. Finally, matches where a team advanced because their opponent with draw are counted as a win for each match their opponent withdrew.
2. FC Dallas were called the Dallas Burn from 1996 to 2004.
3. New York Red Bulls were called the MetroStars from 1994 to 2006.
4. This includes CONCACAF and international records collectively held by the NASL Sounders, USL Sounders, and the MLS Sounders.
5. Sporting Kansas City were called the Kansas City Wiz from 1995 to 1996, and Kansas City Wizards from 1996 to 2011.

== See also ==
- Canadian soccer clubs in international competitions
- MLS performance in the CONCACAF Champions Cup
