= 1966–67 American Soccer League =

American Soccer League 1966–67 season
- Season: 1966–67
- Teams: 11
- Champions: Baltimore St. Gerards
- Premiers: Newark Ukrainian Sitch
- Top goalscorer: Jorge Benitez (16)

Statistics of American Soccer League II in season 1966–67.

== League standings ==
North Division
Team	Pld	W	D	L	GF	GA	Pts
Newark Ukrainian Sitch	14	11	1	2	43	18	24 (Note: 1 bonus point?)
Ukrainian Nationals	13	11	0	2	42	8	22
Boston Tigers	12	6	2	4	35	26	14
Roma SC	9	5	3	1	19	18	11 (Note: 2 points deducted?)
New York Inter	13	3	3	7	27	32	9
Hartford Kings	11	2	1	8	19	38	5

Notes:

South Division
Team	Pld	W	D	L	GF	GA	Pts
Baltimore St. Gerards	9	4	3	2	20	17	11
N.B. Hungarian Americans	12	3	3	6	24	41	9
Olimpia	12	1	3	8	16	35	5
Newark Portuguese	10	1	2	7	12	28	4
Newark Falcons (Note: Newark Falcons disbanded after five games due to financial problems.)	5	0	0	5	3	46	0

== Championship final ==
August 7, 1967

Newark Ukrainian Sitch (NJ)	3–4	Baltimore St. Gerards (MD)
(1st Half) (1st Half) (1st Half)	Report	Winston Alexis 59' (Nixon); Jorge Carnejo 66'; Jorge Carnejo 76' (Nixon); Roland Crispin 89:50' (Nixon)

Attendance: 600
Referee: (USA)
