= 1967–68 American Soccer League =

American Soccer League 1967–68 season
- Season: 1967–68
- Teams: 12
- Champions: Ukrainian Nationals (5th title)
- Premiers: Ukrainian Nationals
- Top goalscorer: Nelson Bergamo (15)
- Longest unbeaten run: New York Inter (11)

Statistics of American Soccer League II in season 1967–68.

== Overview ==
For the 1967–68 season the league set up a two division system to work as a pro/reg tandem, with the First Division being the higher tier. Ultimately pro/reg wound up occurring only on paper because Hartford S.C withdrew after five games, and by season's end Boston, Baltimore, Newark Portuguese, Patterson Roma, and New Brunswick all folded.

Nearly all of the season was played in the later part of 1967, with a handful of make-up games and the playoffs scheduled for early 1968. Weather issues, a slate of regional cup and National Challenge Cup matches, friendlies against both NASL and international sides, and the apparent disorganization of the league itself conspired to continually reschedule those few remaining regular season matches until April. Individually, notching his 15th goal, Rochester's Nelson Bergamo overtook Ivan Paletta of Philadelphia's Ukrainian Nationals for the ASL scoring title in the Lancers' final match of the season on April 28.

The finals were played more than a month later in late May and early June. Newspaper stories at the time indicate that because the Boston Tigers had already closed up shop, the league quickly adapted on the fly and matched First Division winners, Ukrainian Nationals of Philadelphia with Premier Division champions, New York Inter, instead playing semifinal matches, as was originally planned. The Uke-Nats won the two-legged final, 8–4, on aggregate.

== League standings ==
First Division
| Team | Pld | W | D | L | GF | GA | Pts |
|---|---|---|---|---|---|---|---|
| Ukrainian Nationals | 15 | 10 | 3 | 2 | 36 | 12 | 23 |
| Boston Tigers | 15 | 8 | 0 | 7 | 34 | 26 | 16 |
| Washington Britannica | 15 | 7 | 2 | 6 | 28 | 26 | 16 |
| Rochester Lancers | 15 | 6 | 2 | 7 | 34 | 31 | 14 |
| Baltimore Flyers | 15 | 4 | 3 | 8 | 17 | 35 | 11 |
| Newark Ukrainian Sitch | 15 | 4 | 2 | 9 | 15 | 34 | 10 |

Premier Division
| Team | Pld | W | D | L | GF | GA | Pts |
|---|---|---|---|---|---|---|---|
| New York Inter | 11 | 7 | 4 | 0 | 36 | 12 | 18 |
| Fall River Astros | 11 | 6 | 3 | 2 | 23 | 13 | 15 |
| Newark Portuguese | 11 | 5 | 2 | 4 | 24 | 20 | 12 |
| Patterson Roma SC | 11 | 3 | 4 | 4 | 27 | 25 | 10 |
| Hartford S.C. (Note: Hartford S.C. requested and were granted a leave of absence for the remainder of season due to financial problems.) | 5 | 2 | 1 | 2 | 9 | 8 | 5 |
| N.B. Hungarian Americans | 12 | 1 | 0 | 11 | 19 | 55 | 2 |

Updated to match(es) played on April 20, 1968. Source:

== Championship final ==
| Team 1 | Aggregate | Team 2 | First leg | Second leg | Attendance |
| Ukrainian Nationals | 8–4 | New York Inter | 3–3 | 5–1 | May 30 • Edison High Field • ??? June 9 • Eintracht Oval • ??? |

=== First leg ===
May 30, 1968
3:00 PM EDT

| Ukrainian Nationals | 3–3 | New York Inter |
|---|---|---|
| Onofre Benitez (1st Half); Serafin Marolla (1st Half); Ivan Paletta 65' | Report 1 Report 2 | Sloboda Diarejvic (1st Half); Peter Millar (2nd Half), (2nd Half) |

Edison High Field, Philadelphia, Pennsylvania

=== Second leg ===
June 9, 1968
2:30 PM EDT

| New York Inter | 1–5 | Ukrainian Nationals |
|---|---|---|
| | Report 1 Report 2 Report 3 | Ivan Paletta,,, |

Eintracht Oval, Astoria, New York

1969 ASL Champions: Ukrainian Nationals (8–4 aggregate)
