= 1962–63 American Soccer League =

American Soccer League 1962–63 season
- Season: 1962–63
- Teams: 8
- Champions: Ukrainian Nationals (3rd title)
- Top goalscorer: Ismael Ferreyra (14)

Statistics of American Soccer League II in season 1962–63.

== League standings ==
Pos	Team	Pld	W	D	L	GF	GA	Pts
1	Ukrainian Nationals	14	10	1	3	51	13	21
2	Inter SC	13	9	2	2	30	22	20
3	Fall River SC	12	6	3	3	21	13	15
4	Newark Portuguese	13	6	3	4	29	28	15
5	Newark Ukrainian Sitch	14	6	2	6	29	28	14
6	New York Hakoah-Americans	12	4	3	5	33	20	11
7	Falcons-Warsaw	14	2	1	11	23	40	5
8	Uhrik Truckers	14	1	1	12	13	74	3

Source: rsssf.com

Note: 44 total wins does not match 46 total losses
