= 1968 American Soccer League =

American Soccer League 1968 season
- Season: 1968
- Teams: 8
- Champions: Washington Darts
- Top goalscorer: Gerry Browne (12)
- Longest winning run: Washington Darts (5)
- Longest unbeaten run: Washington Darts (9)

Statistics of American Soccer League II in season 1968.

== League standings ==
Pos	Team	Pld	W	D	L	GF	GA	Pts
1	Washington Darts	12	10	1	1	36	5	21
2	Rochester Lancers	12	6	1	5	32	20	13
3	Philadelphia Ukrainians	9	6	0	3	24	13	12
4	New York Inter	9	5	1	3	15	11	11
5	Fall River Astros	10	4	0	6	18	20	8
6	Newark Ukrainian Sitch	9	2	1	6	12	20	5
7	Hartford Kings	13	2	0	11	13	60	4
