= 1969 Washington Darts season =

Washington Darts
1969 season
- Chairman: William Cousins Jr.
- Manager: Norman Sutherland
- ASL: Southern Division: First place ASL Championship: Winners
Home colors	Away colors

The 1969 Washington Darts season was the second season of the team in the American Soccer League, and the club's third season in professional soccer. This year, the team earned first place in the Southern Division and made it into the championship game known as the ASL Final. They were this year's champions. It would be the last year of the club in the ASL as it joined the North American Soccer league in the following year with a new team under the same name in 1970.

== Competitions ==
=== ASL regular season ===
==== League standings ====
Northern Division
Team	Pld	W	D	L	GF	GA	Pts
Syracuse Scorpions	20	12	5	3	53	26	29
Rochester Lancers	20	12	5	3	41	18	29
Boston Astros	20	5	0	15	24	48	10
New York Inter	20	2	4	14	20	44	8

Southern Division
Team	Pld	W	D	L	GF	GA	Pts
Washington Darts	20	14	5	1	46	11	33
Philadelphia Spartans	20	7	5	8	26	32	19
Philadelphia Ukrainians	20	7	5	8	27	38	19
Newark Ukrainian Sitch	20	6	1	13	34	54	13

=== ASL Playoffs ===
==== Northern Division playoff ====
October 11	Rochester Lancers	1–2	Syracuse Scorpions	Aquinas Memorial Stadium • Att. ???

==== Championship final ====
Team 1	Aggregate	Team 2	First leg	Second leg	Attendance
Syracuse Scorpions	0–4	Washington Darts	0–2	0–2	September 19 • Griffin Field • ??? September 26 • Brookland Stadium • 3,976

==== Match reports ====
===== First leg =====
October 19, 1969
2:30 PM EST

Syracuse Scorpions	0–2	Washington Darts
	Report	Kerr 39' (Gyau); Browne 41'

Griffin Field, Liverpool, New York
Attendance: ???

===== Second leg =====
October 26, 1969
EST

Washington Darts	2–0	Syracuse Scorpions
Browne 5'; Gyau 86' (Kerr)	Report

Brookland Stadium, Washington, D.C.
Attendance: 3,976
