= Ernest Inneh =

Nigerian-American soccer player and coach

Personal information
- Date of birth: September 25, 1970 (age 56)
- Place of birth: Nigeria
- Height: 5 ft 10 in (1.78 m)
- Positions: Forward; midfielder

Youth career
- 1988–1991: Brooklyn College

Senior career*
Years	Team	Apps	(Gls)
1989	Victoria Vistas	15	(3)
1991	Brooklyn Italians		
1991	Penn-Jersey Spirit	3	(1)
1992–1993	Korinthos	18	(1)
1994–1996	Agios Nikolaos		
1996–1997	Panelefsiniakos		
1997–1998	Long Island Rough Riders	24	(9)
1998–1999	Staten Island Vipers	32	(22)
2000–2004	Westchester Flames		
2000	→ Rochester Rhinos (loan)	1	(0)

Managerial career
- 2003–2004: Westchester Flames (assistant)
- 2005: Westchester Flames
- 2018: Auburndale Academy 03 (head)
- * Club domestic league appearances and goals

Ernest Inneh (born September 25, 1970, in Nigeria) is a retired Nigerian-American soccer player. He is now a coach at the Metropolitan Oval Development Academy. He scored the only goal in the final of the 1991 U.S. Open Cup.

== Playing career ==
Inneh, a native of Nigeria, attended Brooklyn College where he played on the men's soccer team from 1988 to 1991. In addition to playing collegiate soccer, Inneh also played for the Victoria Vistas of the Canadian Soccer League and the Brooklyn Italians in the Cosmopolitan Soccer League. On August 10, 1991, he scored the winning goal for the Brooklyn Italians in the final of the 1991 U.S. Open Cup. He then signed with the Penn-Jersey Spirit of the American Professional Soccer League. He played one game with the team on August 24, 1991.

Inneh then pursued a successful career in Greece playing with Greek first division club Korinthos F.C., where he famously scored against Olympiakos CFP. Korinthos were relegated following the 1992–93 season, and Inneh played for the club in the Greek second division. Poised for a move to one of the big three in Greece, Inneh injured his knee and required surgery. He returned to play in the Greek third division with Agios Nikolaos F.C. during the 1994–95 season. He joined Greek second division club Panelefsiniakos F.C. in 1996.

Inneh then returned to continue his career in the United States. In 1997, he signed with the Long Island Rough Riders of the USISL halfway through the season, scoring nine goals in eleven games. On February 1, 1998, the Dallas Burn selected Inneh in the second round (twenty-second overall) of the 1998 MLS Supplemental Draft. The Burn did not sign Inneh and he returned to the Rough Riders, but was unable to replicate his scoring feats through thirteen games. On August 14, 1998, Long Island traded Inneh to the Staten Island Vipers in exchange for Roberto Deluca. He remained with the Vipers in 1999, earning A-League First XI honors after scoring eighteen goals in twenty-four games. In February 2000, the Tampa Bay Mutiny selected Inneh in the sixth round of the 2000 MLS SuperDraft. The Mutiny waived him on April 20, 2000. He then signed with the Westchester Flames in the Premier Development League. At the end of the season, he went on loan with the Rochester Rhinos as they entered the playoffs. The Rhinos won the USL A-League championship. In 2001, he was back with Westchester, playing with the team through the 2004 season.

== Coaching career ==
Inneh became an assistant coach with the Flames in 2003. In 2005, he became head coach and resigned on February 26, 2006, and became head of the club's youth development system.

Inneh now coaches for Westchester Flames and Auburndale Soccer club.
