= 1964–65 American Soccer League =

American Soccer competition

American Soccer League 1964–65 season
- Season: 1964–65
- Teams: 6
- Champions: Hartford S.C.
- Top goalscorer: Herculiano Riguerdo (7)

Statistics of American Soccer League II in season 1964–65.

== League standings ==
Pos	Team	Pld	W	D	L	GF	GA	Pts
1	Hartford S.C.	9	8	0	1	22	9	16
2	Newark Portuguese	9	6	0	3	20	10	12
3	Roma SC	10	5	2	3	21	18	12
4	N.B. Hungarian Americans	8	3	1	4	24	23	7
5	Uhrik Truckers	8	2	1	5	9	18	5
6	Newark Falcons	8	0	0	8	8	26	0

Source: rsssf.com
