= 1981 National Challenge Cup =

- Dewar Challenge Cup

Tournament details
- Country: United States

Final positions
- Champions: Maccabee Los Angeles (5th title)
- Runners-up: Brooklyn Dodgers S.C.
- 1982 CONCACAF Champions' Cup: Brooklyn Dodgers S.C.

The 1981 National Challenge Cup was the 68th edition of the USSF's annual open soccer championship. Teams from the North American Soccer League declined to participate. Maccabee A.C. defeated Brooklyn Dodgers in the final game. The score was 5–1.
