= 1991 U.S. Open Cup =

- Dewar Challenge Cup

Tournament details
- Country: United States

Final positions
- Champions: Brooklyn Italians
- Runners-up: Richardson Rockets
- 1992 CONCACAF Champions' Cup: Richardson Rockets
- 1991 CONCACAF Cup Winners Cup: Brooklyn Italians

The 1991 United States Open Cup was the 78th edition of the soccer tournament to crown the national champion of the United States.

The Brooklyn Italians (NESSL) won the cup 1–0 against the Richardson Rockets (USISL) of Texas in a match played at Brooklyn College in Brooklyn, New York.

== Bracket ==
Quarterfinals; May 27-Jul 7
USASA	Madison 56ers	4
NSL	RWB Adria	4
NESSL	Brooklyn Italians	3
USASA	Fairfax Spartans	0
SISL	Richardson Rockets	8
USASA	Galveston NASA	2
SISL	New Mexico Chiles	5
PL	Strikers (CA)	0

Semifinals; July 28
NSL	RWB Adria	0
NESSL	Brooklyn Italians	1
SISL	Richardson Rockets	1
SISL	New Mexico Chiles	0

Final; August 10
NESSL	Brooklyn Italians	1
SISL	Richardson Rockets	0

=== Regional semifinals ===
- I Cambridge Faialense SC (MA) 1-3 Brooklyn Italians (NY)
- I Fairfax Spartans (VA) 5-0 Vereinigung Erzgebirge (PA)
- II RWB Adria (IL) W-L Fort Wayne SC (IN)
- II Madison 56ers (WI) 1-0 St. Louis Scott Gallagher (MO)
- III Richardson Rockets (TX) 2-0 Atlanta Datagraphic (GA)
- III Galveston NASA (TX) 2-0 Wichita Falls Fever (KS)
- IV Strikers (CA) 4-3 Fatigue Tech (WA)
- IV New Mexico Chiles (NM) 2-0 San Jose Oaks (CA)

=== Regional Finals ===
- I Brooklyn Italians (NY) 3-0 Fairfax Spartans (VA)
- II Madison 56ers (WI) 4-4 RWB Adria (IL) RWB advance 7-6 PK's
- III Richardson Rockets (TX) 8-2 FC Galveston NASA (TX)
- IV New Mexico Chiles (NM) 5-0 Strikers (CA)

=== Semifinals ===
- Richardson Rockets 1-0 New Mexico Chiles
- RWB Adria 1-0 Brooklyn Italians RWB disqualified for using players not registered with the USSF. Brooklyn awarded match after protest.

== Championship ==
August 10, 1991

Richardson Rockets	0–1	Brooklyn Italians
	(Report)	Ernest Inneh 6'

Brooklyn College; Brooklyn, New York
Referee: Steve Olson
