= Walter Chyzowych =

Soccer player and coach (1937–1994)

Personal information
- Date of birth: April 20, 1937
- Place of birth: Sambor, Lwów Voivodeship, Poland
- Date of death: September 2, 1994 (aged 57)
- Place of death: Winston-Salem, North Carolina, United States
- Position: Forward

Youth career
- 1957–1961: Temple Owls

Senior career*
Years	Team	Apps	(Gls)
1958–1965	Philadelphia Ukrainian Nationals	?	(?)
1961–1964	Toronto City	?	(?)
1966	Newark Ukrainian Sitch	?	(?)
1967	Philadelphia Spartans	15	(3)
1968–1970	Newark Ukrainian Sitch	?	(?)
1971–1975	Philadelphia Ukrainian Nationals	?	(?)

International career
1964–1965	United States	3	(0)

Managerial career
- 1961–1964: Philadelphia Textile
- 1966–1975: Philadelphia Textile
- 1971–1975: Philadelphia Ukrainian Nationals (assistant)
- 1976–1980: United States
- 1981–1982: Philadelphia Fever
- 1986–1994: Wake Forest Demon Deacons
- * Club domestic league appearances and goals

Walter Chyzowych (Ukrainian: Володимир Чижович, romanized: Volodymyr Chyzhovych) (April 20, 1937 – September 2, 1994) was a soccer player who played for Philadelphia Ukrainian Nationals and Newark Sitch of the American Soccer League and was later a coach for the United States national soccer team. His older brother Gene Chyzowych (1935–2014) was also a professional soccer player and coach. Born in Poland, he represented the United States national team.

Chyzowych moved to the United States at an early age and was two-time first team All-American at Temple University where he attended from 1957 to 1961, setting a team record for goals with 25. His first club team was Toronto City from 1961 to 1964. In 1964, Chyzowych earned his first cap with the national team; in total, he earned three caps. Chyzowych also played one season for the Philadelphia Spartans of the National Professional Soccer League in 1967; he played 15 games earning three goals and three assists.

Chyzowych began his coaching career while as a caretaker manager, coaching the Philadelphia Textile from 1961 to 1963.

Alongside Gene Hart doing play-by-play, he provided color commentary for the 1973 Finals of the North American Soccer League between the Philadelphia Atoms and the Dallas Tornado. He also served as the touchline reporter at Soccer Bowl '77. Chyzowych was the director of coaching for the U.S. Soccer Federation from 1975 to 1981. He coached the National Team from 1976 to 1980, including the qualification rounds for the 1978 and 1982 World Cups. His biggest win while with the National Team was 2–0 upset of Hungary in 1979. Overall, he had a respectable 8–14–10 record while with the national team. In 1986, he was named head coach at Wake Forest University, leading the team to four NCAA bids and one ACC championship in eight years.

Chyzowych was inducted in the National Soccer Hall of Fame in 1997.
