= MLS performance in the CONCACAF Champions Cup =

Major League Soccer teams have participated in the CONCACAF Champions Cup (formerly the CONCACAF Champions League from 2008 to 2023) each season since 1997. As of 2023, a maximum of ten MLS teams can qualify to the CONCACAF Champions Cup each season — one from the US Open Cup, one from the Canadian Championship, three through the Leagues Cup berths, and five through Major League Soccer.

Under the Champions Cup's updated format starting in 2008–09, the first MLS team to finish first in its group was Real Salt Lake in 2010.

The first Champions League title won by an MLS side occurred in 2022, when Seattle Sounders FC defeated Mexico's UNAM 5–2 on aggregate in the final. Seattle was therefore the first MLS side to participate at the FIFA Club World Cup. Real Salt Lake, CF Montréal, Toronto FC, Los Angeles FC, Columbus Crew and Vancouver Whitecaps FC all also reached the final, with Real Salt Lake losing to Monterrey in 2011, CF Montréal to América in 2015, Toronto FC to Guadalajara in 2018, Los Angeles FC to UANL in 2020, León in 2023, Columbus Crew to Pachuca in 2024 and Vancouver Whitecaps FC to Cruz Azul in 2025, respectively.

== Performance by round ==
The following table shows the number of MLS participants in the Champions Cup each season, as well as the number of MLS teams that have reached various stages in the knockout rounds. MLS teams performed poorly during the first two years, as fixture congestion from the Superliga tournament as well as CONCACAF Champions League preliminary rounds meant that MLS teams often fielded teams without their first choice players.

Beginning in 2018, the Champions League format was changed to eliminate group play and the knockout round started with sixteen teams rather than eight. Beginning in 2024, the format was expanded to include five knockout rounds and twenty-seven teams.

Tournament	Participants	Quarter- finalists	Semi- finalists	Finalists	Champions
1997	2	2	2	1	—
1998	2	1	1	1	1
1999	3	2	2	—	—
2000	2	2	2	1	1
2002	4	3	1	—	—
2003	4	2	—	—	—
2004	2	2	1	—	—
2005	2	2	1	—	—
2006	2	2	—	—	—
2007	2	2	2	—	—
2008	2	2	2	—	—
2008–09	4	1	—	—	—
2009–10	5	1	—	—	—
2010–11	5	2	1	1	—
2011–12	5	3	1	—	—
2012–13	5	3	2	—	—
2013–14	5	3	—	—	—
2014–15	5	2	1	1	—
2015–16	5	4	—	—	—
2016–17	5	3	2	—	—
2018	5	3	2	1	—
2019	5	4	1	—	—
2020	5	4	1	1	—
2021	5	5	1	—	—
2022	5	4	2	1	1
2023	5	3	2	1	—
2024	10	3	1	1	—
2025	10	4	2	1	—
2026	9	4	2	—	—

Notes:

- MLS sent only four teams to the Champions League in 2008–09 because the Canadian team, the Montreal Impact, played in the USL First Division at the time.

== Performance by opposition in knockout series ==
The following table shows the performance of MLS teams in the knockout rounds for each home-and-away series for opponents from various leagues. During the first nine seasons of the Champions League, MLS teams did not play any foreign teams in knockout stage other than Mexico, Costa Rica, and Panama. With the change in tournament format in the 2018 season, specifically with the knockout rounds now including a round of 16, MLS teams have played knockout matches against a greater variety of countries.

In the Champions Cup knockout rounds, MLS teams have played Mexican teams more than any other country, in some years facing multiple matchups. Seattle's 2013 quarter-final win over Mexico's UANL was the first time since the Champions League format began in 2008–09 that an MLS team eliminated a Mexican team in the knockout rounds. Montreal repeated the feat in 2015 when they beat Mexico's Pachuca in the quarter-finals. In 2018, Toronto FC and the New York Red Bulls both advanced to the semi-finals by beating Mexican teams, the first time that two MLS teams eliminated two Mexican teams in the same tournament. In 2020, Los Angeles FC became the first MLS team to eliminate three Mexican teams in the same tournament — beating Mexican opponents in the Round of 16, quarterfinals, and semifinals, before losing in the final to a Mexican team. MLS' improved performance against Mexican teams was attributed to MLS club academies focused on player development, and an increase in player salaries through the league's Targeted Allocation Money (TAM) program.

As of May 6, 2026

Tournament	Mexico	(Trinidad and Tobago) Trinidad and Tobago	El Salvador	Honduras	Costa Rica	(Guatemala) Guatemala	Panama	Jamaica	(Dominican Republic) Dominican Republic	Nicaragua	Haiti	Canada
1997	0–1	1–0	1–0	—	—	—	—	—	—	—	—	—
1998	2–0	1–0	—	—	—	—	—	—	—	—	—	—
1999	0–1	1–0	—	1–0	0–1	—	—	—	—	—	—	—
2000	—	—	—	2–0	1–0	—	—	—	—	—	—	—
2002	1–3	1–0	—	1–0	—	1–0	—	—	—	—	—	—
2003	0–2	—	—	1–0	0–1	0–1	1–0	—	—	—	—	—
2004	—	1–0	—	—	0–2	—	—	—	—	—	—	—
2005	0–1	—	—	—	0–1	—	—	1–0	—	—	—	—
2006	—	—	—	—	0–2	—	—	—	—	—	—	—
2007	0–2	—	—	1–0	1–0	—	—	—	—	—	—	—
2008	0–1	—	—	—	0–1	1–0	—	1–0	—	—	—	—
Subtotal	3–11	5–0	1–0	6–0	2–8	2–1	1–0	2–0	—	—	—	—
2008–09	0–1	—	—	—	—	—	—	—	—	—	—	—
2009–10	0–1	—	—	—	—	—	—	—	—	—	—	—
2010–11	0–1	—	—	—	1–0	—	—	—	—	—	—	—
2011–12	0–2	—	—	—	—	—	—	—	—	—	—	—
2012–13	1–3	—	—	—	1–0	—	—	—	—	—	—	—
2013–14	0–3	—	—	—	—	—	—	—	—	—	—	—
2014–15	1–1	—	—	—	1–1	—	—	—	—	—	—	—
2015–16	0–4	—	—	—	—	—	—	—	—	—	—	—
2016–17	0–2	—	—	—	—	—	1–0	—	—	—	—	—
Subtotal	2–18	—	—	—	3–1	—	1–0	—	—	—	—	—
2018	3–3	—	1–0	1–0	—	—	0–1	—	—	—	—	—
2019	1–4	—	—	—	1–0	1–0	1–1	—	1–0	—	—	—
2020	3–3	—	—	1–2	2–0	—	—	—	—	—	—	—
2021	1–4	—	—	1–0	2–0	—	—	—	—	1–0	—	—
2022	3–2	—	—	1–0	1–0	1–1	—	—	—	—	1–0	—
2023	1–2	—	1–0	1–0	1–0	—	—	—	—	—	0–1	—
2024	2–7	—	—	—	2–0	—	1–0	1–0	1–0	—	—	1–0
2025	2–4	—	—	1–0	2–1	1–0	—	1–0	—	—	—	—
2026	3–7	1–0	—	1–0	2–0	—	1–0	1–0	1–0	—	—	1–0
Subtotal	19–36	1–0	2–0	7–2	13–1	3–1	3–2	3–0	3–0	1–0	1–1	2–0
Totals	24–65 (27%)	6–0 (100%)	3–0 (100%)	13–2 (87%)	18–10 (64%)	5–2 (71%)	5–2 (71%)	5–0 (100%)	2–0 (100%)	1–0 (100%)	1–1 (50%)	2–0 (100%)

== CONCACAF Club Ranking ==
In 2023, CONCACAF released a new club ranking system ahead of the revamped Champions Cup and regional competitions. It replaced the former CONCACAF Club Index as the method used to seed clubs in international competitions. A modified Elo rating system, MLS teams receive updated ratings from results in MLS, Champions Cup, Leagues Cup, US Open Cup, and Club World Cup matches, with more weight placed on international matches.

As of November 16, 2026

Rank	Change	Club	Points
1	Same position	(Mexico) Toluca	1,285
2	Same position	(Mexico) Cruz Azul	1,267
3	Same position	(Mexico) Tigres UANL	1,246
4	Same position	(United States) Nashville SC	1,237
5	Same position	(Mexico) América	1,236
6	Same position	(Mexico) Guadalajara	1,236
7	Same position	(United States) Los Angeles FC	1,222
8	Same position	(United States) Inter Miami CF	1,221
9	▲	(Mexico) Monterrey	1,213
9	▼	(United States) Columbus Crew	1,212
10	▼	(Mexico) Pachuca	1,210
12	Same position	(Mexico) León	1,207
13	Same position	(Canada) Vancouver Whitecaps FC	1,203
14	Same position	(United States) Seattle Sounders FC	1,201
15	Same position	(Mexico) Pumas UNAM	1,197
16	Same position	(United States) FC Dallas	1,196
17	Same position	(United States) Charlotte FC	1,195
18	Same position	(United States) Chicago Fire FC	1,192
19	Same position	(United States) FC Cincinnati	1,192
20	Same position	(United States) Philadelphia Union	1,192

== Performance by team ==
As of 2024, 27 MLS teams have appeared in the CONCACAF Champions Cup since MLS began sending teams to the competition in 1997.

Seattle Sounders FC became champions in 2022, ending Liga MX's winning streak in the competition since 2006. They were the fifth MLS club to make it to the final, following Real Salt Lake in 2011, Montreal Impact in 2015, Toronto FC in 2018 and Los Angeles FC in 2020.

Canadian teams in MLS – CF Montréal, Toronto FC and Vancouver Whitecaps FC – qualify to the Champions Cup via a separate competition, the Canadian Championship, and they represent the Canadian Soccer Association. Starting in 2024, all three Canadian teams may also qualify through MLS or Leagues Cup. MLS standings were used for Canadian teams qualification only twice: the 2014 season to determine the 2015–16 Champions League representative, as the Canadian Championship format was changed that season, and the 2020 season to determine the 2021 Champions League representative, as the 2020 Canadian Championship was postponed indefinitely due to the COVID-19 pandemic.

Starting in 2018, the group stage was removed, so MLS teams now started in the Round of 16 (first round). Starting in 2024, one or two MLS teams receive byes to the round of 16 (second round) while others enter in the first round of 22 teams.

As of May 6, 2026

Team	Apps	Pld	W	D	L	GF	GA	GD	Best Result
Atlanta United FC	3	8	4	1	3	11	10	+1	Quarter-finals
Austin FC	1	2	1	0	1	2	3	–1	Round of 16
Chivas USA*	1	2	0	1	1	1	3	–2	Preliminary round
Chicago Fire	3	11	6	2	3	18	14	+4	Third place
FC Cincinnati	3	12	6	2	4	31	14	+17	Round of 16
Colorado Rapids	5	14	5	2	7	15	21	–6	Round of 16
Columbus Crew	6	29	12	7	10	37	42	–5	Final
FC Dallas	3	18	9	3	6	27	25	+2	Semi-finals
D.C. United	12	52	24	12	16	84	71	+13	Champions
Houston Dynamo FC	8	40	15	11	14	48	48	0	Semi-finals
Inter Miami CF	3	14	6	3	5	20	17	+3	Semi-finals
LA Galaxy	12	54	23	14	17	89	70	+19	Champions
Los Angeles FC	4	27	15	3	9	48	28	+20	Final
CF Montréalǂ	4	22	8	7	7	27	26	+1	Final
Nashville SC	2	12	5	4	3	19	8	+11	Semi-finals
New England Revolution	5	14	5	2	7	18	25	–7	Quarter-finals
New York City FC	2	10	5	1	4	19	17	+2	Semi-finals
New York Red Bulls	5	22	8	8	6	27	19	+8	Semi-finals
Orlando City SC	2	6	2	3	1	9	6	+3	Round of 16
Philadelphia Union	4	20	8	7	5	36	24	+12	Semi-finals
Portland Timbers	3	12	6	3	3	31	19	+12	Quarter-finals
Real Salt Lake	4	24	11	7	6	35	24	+11	Final
San Diego FC	1	4	2	0	2	7	8	–1	Round of 16
San Jose Earthquakes	4	14	7	2	5	16	16	0	Quarter-finals
Seattle Sounders FC	9	54	25	12	17	87	69	+18	Champions
St. Louis City SC	1	2	1	0	1	2	2	0	Round one
Sporting Kansas City	7	32	12	6	14	41	45	–4	Semi-finals
Toronto FCǂ	7	34	14	10	10	46	45	+1	Final
Vancouver Whitecaps FCǂ	6	31	11	8	12	41	44	–3	Final

ǂ – team represents Canada
* – team folded

MLS performance since the beginning of the Champions League era
Team	Apps	08-09	09-10	10-11	11-12	12-13	13-14	14-15	15-16	16-17	2018	2019	2020	2021	2022	2023	2024	2025	2026
Atlanta United FC	3	did not exist									•	QF	QF	QF	•	•	•	•	•
Austin FC	1	did not exist													•	R16	•	•	•
Chivas USA	1	PR	•	•	•	•	•	Team dissolved											
FC Cincinnati	3	did not exist											•	•	•	•	R16	R16	R16
Colorado Rapids	4	•	•	•	GS	•	•	•	•	•	R16	•	•	•	R16	•	•	R1	•
Columbus Crew	5	•	QF	QF	•	•	•	•	•	•	•	•	•	QF	•	•	F	R16	•
FC Dallas	3	•	•	•	GS	•	•	•	•	SF	R16	•	•	•	•	•	•	•	•
D.C. United	4	GS	GS	•	•	•	•	QF	QF	•	•	•	•	•	•	•	•	•	•
Houston Dynamo FC	6	QF	GS	•	•	QF	GS	•	•	•	•	QF	•	•	•	•	R16	•	•
Inter Miami CF	3	did not exist												•	•	•	QF	SF	R16
LA Galaxy	7	•	•	PR	QF	SF	QF	•	QF	•	•	•	•	•	•	•	•	QF	QF
Los Angeles FC	4	did not exist										•	F	•	•	F	•	QF	SF
CF Montréal	5	QF	•	•	•	•	GS	F	•	•	•	•	QF	•	QF	•	•	•	•
Nashville SC	2	did not exist												•	•	•	R16	•	SF
New England Revolution	3	PR	•	•	•	•	•	•	•	•	•	•	•	•	QF	•	QF	•	•
New York City FC	2	did not exist								•	•	•	QF	•	SF	•	•	•	•
New York Red Bulls	5	•	PR	•	•	•	•	GS	•	QF	SF	QF	•	•	•	•	•	•	•
Orlando City SC	2	did not exist								•	•	•	•	•	•	R16	R16	•	•
Philadelphia Union	4	did not exist			•	•	•	•	•	•	•	•	•	SF	•	SF	R16	•	R16
Portland Timbers	3	•	•	•	•	•	•	GS	•	GS	•	•	•	QF	•	•	•	•	•
Real Salt Lake	4	•	•	F	•	GS	•	•	QF	•	•	•	•	•	•	•	•	R1	•
San Diego FC	1	did not exist																	R16
San Jose Earthquakes	1	•	•	•	•	•	QF	•	•	•	•	•	•	•	•	•	•	•	•
Seattle Sounders FC	9	•	•	GS	QF	SF	•	•	QF	•	QF	•	R16	•	C	•	•	R16	QF
St. Louis City SC	1	did not exist															R1	•	•
Sporting Kansas City	5	•	•	•	•	•	QF	GS	•	GS	•	SF	•	•	•	•	•	R1	•
Toronto FC	7	•	PR	GS	SF	GS	•	•	•	•	F	R16	•	QF	•	•	•	•	•
Vancouver Whitecaps FC	6	•	•	•	•	•	•	•	GS	SF	•	•	•	•	•	QF	R1	F	R16

=== Records ===
Biggest win: 8 goal margin
D.C. United 8–0 (Trinidad and Tobago) Joe Public (1998 Quarter-finals)

Biggest defeat: 6 goal margin
(Mexico) Atlético Morelia 6–0 Columbus Crew (2003 Quarter-finals, first leg)
(Mexico) Pachuca 6–0 Philadelphia Union (2024 Round of 16, second leg)

== Other continental competitions ==
MLS teams have participated in other continental competitions.

=== Copa Sudamericana ===
- 2005 — D.C. United played in the Round of 16, where they lost 3–4 in aggregate over two legs (1–1, 2–3) to Chile's Universidad Católica.
- 2007 — D.C. United played in the Round of 16, where they lost 2–2 on aggregate on away goals (2–1, 0–1) to Mexico's Guadalajara.

== See also ==
- American soccer clubs in international competitions
- Canadian soccer clubs in international competitions
