= MLS Cup 2019 =

2019 edition of the MLS Cup

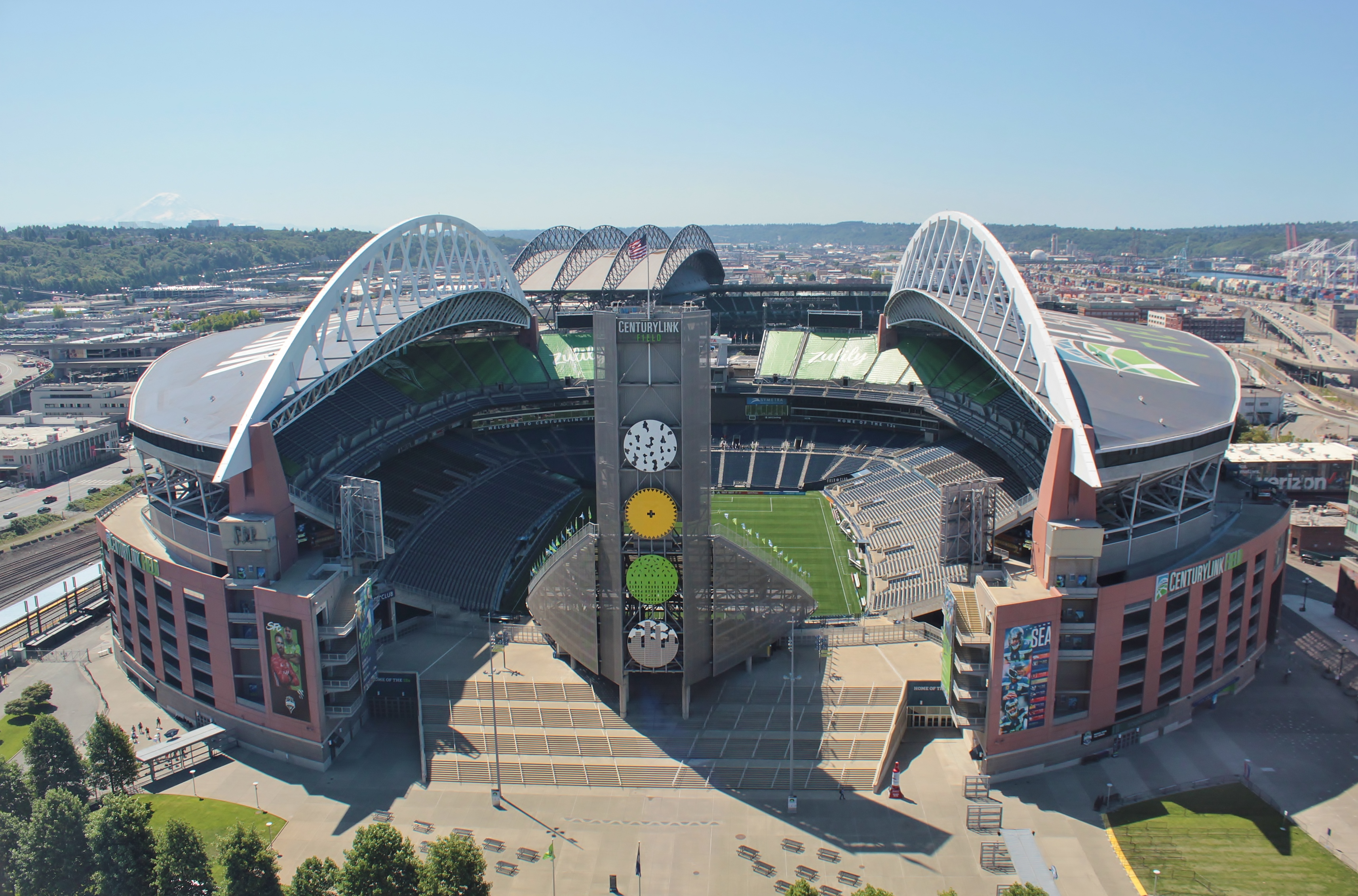
- CenturyLink Field in Seattle hosted the match.
- Event: MLS Cup
Seattle Sounders FC	Toronto FC
3	1
- Date: November 10, 2019
- Venue: CenturyLink Field, Seattle, Washington, U.S.
- MLS Cup MVP: Víctor Rodríguez (Seattle Sounders FC)
- Referee: Allen Chapman
- Attendance: 69,274
- Weather: Cloudy, 53 °F (12 °C)

MLS Cup 2019 was the 24th edition of the MLS Cup, the championship match of Major League Soccer (MLS), and took place on November 10, 2019, at CenturyLink Field in Seattle, Washington, United States. The soccer match was contested by Seattle Sounders FC and Toronto FC to determine the champion of the 2019 season. It was a rematch of the 2016 and 2017 editions of the MLS Cup, which were won by Seattle and Toronto, respectively. This was the third final for both teams and the first MLS Cup to be hosted by the Sounders, as both of the previous Seattle–Toronto finals were held at BMO Field in Toronto, Ontario, Canada.

The Sounders won 3–1 to claim their second MLS Cup title in front of 69,274 spectators at CenturyLink Field, which set a new stadium attendance record. They scored three goals in the second half, beginning with a deflected shot by Kelvin Leerdam and followed by strikes from substitute Víctor Rodríguez (later named the match MVP) and Raúl Ruidíaz. Jozy Altidore scored a late consolation goal for Toronto in stoppage time.

The match marked the conclusion of the 2019 MLS Cup Playoffs, which was contested by fourteen teams under a new single-elimination format that replaced the former two-legged ties. As a result, this was the earliest calendar date for the MLS Cup showdown since 2002. The defending MLS Cup champions, Atlanta United FC, were eliminated in the Eastern Conference Finals by Toronto FC. As MLS Cup champions, Seattle qualified for the 2020 CONCACAF Champions League and the later-cancelled 2020 Campeones Cup.

== Road to the final ==
The MLS Cup is the post-season championship of Major League Soccer (MLS), a professional club soccer league in the United States and Canada. The 2019 season was the 24th in MLS history and was contested by 24 teams organized into the Eastern and Western conferences. Each club played 34 matches during the regular season from March to October, facing each team in their conference twice and those in the other conference once. The playoffs, which ran from October to early November, were contested over four rounds by the top seven clubs in each conference. Each round had a single-elimination match hosted by the higher-seeded team, a change from the two-legged ties used in previous seasons; the top team in each conference was also given a bye to the Conference Semifinals. The shortened playoff schedule—made possible by removing second legs—moved the date of the final to November 10, its earliest staging since 2002.

The finalists, Seattle Sounders FC and Toronto FC, played each other in the MLS Cup final for the third time in four years, following their participation in the 2016 and 2017 finals. Both matches were hosted in Toronto, with the 2016 cup won by Seattle in a penalty shootout and the 2017 cup won by Toronto in regulation time. The two teams had met 14 times in regular season play, with the Sounders the winner in nine of those matches. Seattle and Toronto played each other once in the 2019 regular season; the Sounders won 3–2 at home in the April match.

=== Seattle Sounders FC ===
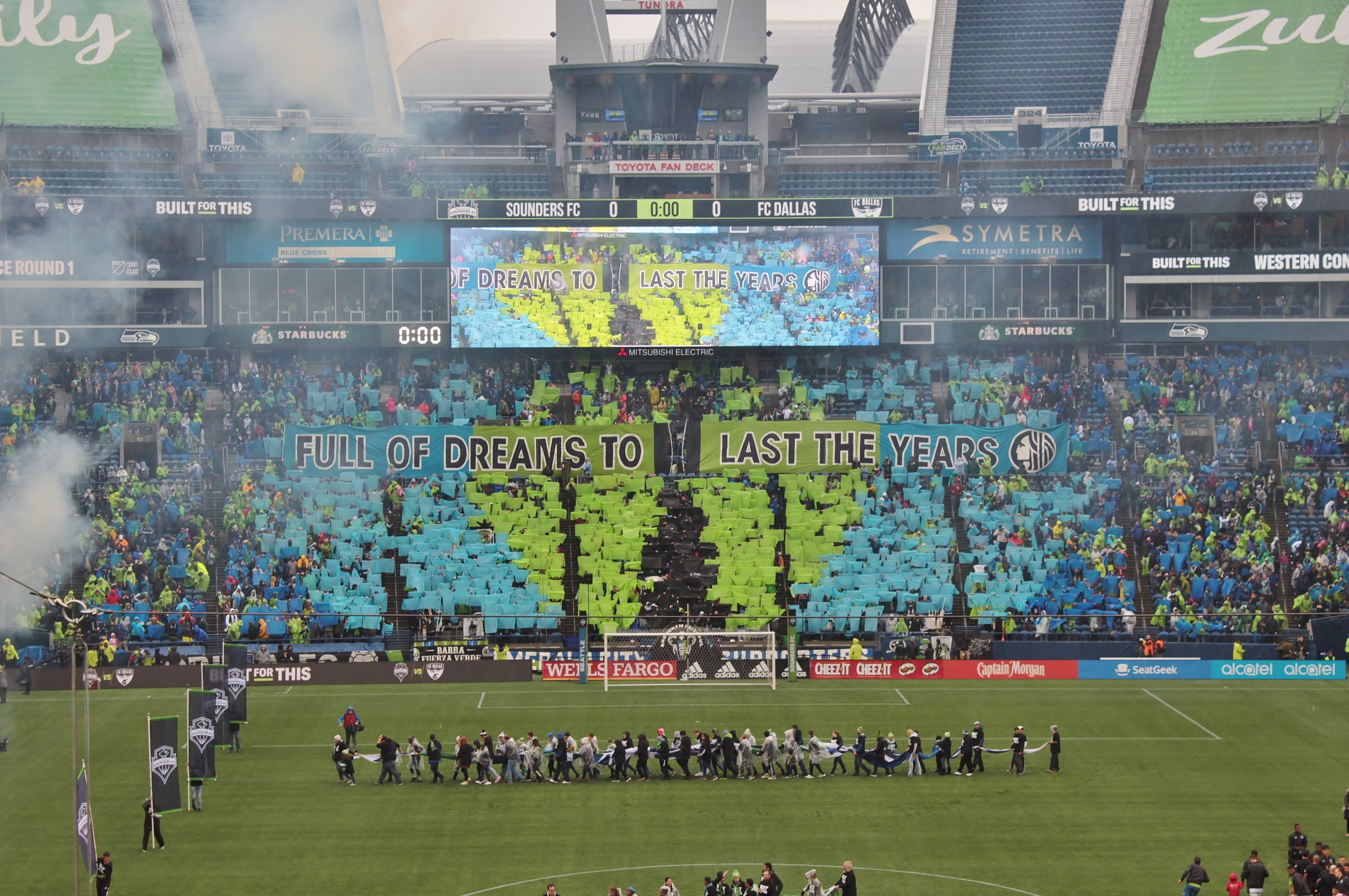
An Emerald City Supporters tifo prior to the Sounders' playoff match against FC Dallas

Seattle Sounders FC played in their third MLS Cup final in four seasons, having won in their first appearance in 2016 under manager Brian Schmetzer. The team had qualified for the playoffs in all of their eleven MLS seasons and finished as runner-up in MLS Cup 2017. In 2018, the team finished second in the Western Conference through a late-season winning streak but were knocked out by the Portland Timbers in the Conference Semifinals during a penalty shootout. During the 2019 offseason, the Sounders lost defensive midfielder and captain Osvaldo Alonso, who was released into free agency and signed by Minnesota United FC.

The Sounders made few offseason moves; they signed several homegrown players for use by their affiliate team and went winless in preseason matches. The team lost just one of its first thirteen matches of the season. In early May, the Sounders signed center-back Xavier Arreaga as a Designated Player and left-back Joevin Jones upon his return to the team from the 2. Bundesliga. Later that month, center-back Chad Marshall retired.

The team lost several players to injuries and international call-ups in June and had a three-match losing streak before recovering to win four matches in late June and early July. In early August, defender Román Torres received a ten-match suspension for violating the league's performance-enhancing substances policy. Also that month, the team went winless for four matches before a win against the Portland Timbers. Seattle won four of their last seven matches and clinched a playoff berth; they finished second in the Western Conference behind Los Angeles FC (LAFC), who won the Supporters' Shield and set league records for points and goal differential.

In the first round of the playoffs, Seattle hosted FC Dallas. Goals from Raúl Ruidíaz and Jordan Morris allowed Seattle to take a 2–1 lead in the first half; Dallas's Matt Hedges tied the match in the 64th minute, but Morris briefly restored the Sounders' lead before the match was tied 3–3 by the end of regulation time. In extra time, Morris completed his first career hat-trick with a goal in the 113th minute to cap a 4–3 victory. Seattle went on to host Real Salt Lake in the Conference Semifinals, winning 2–0 with a goal and assist from Nicolás Lodeiro in the second half. Gustav Svensson opened the scoring in the 64th minute by heading in a corner kick taken by Lodeiro. In the 81st minute, Lodeiro scored on a counterattack. The team extended their home playoff winning streak to eleven matches.

The Sounders traveled to play Los Angeles FC in the Western Conference Final at Banc of California Stadium. LAFC took the lead in the 17th minute through a free kick by Eduard Atuesta, but Seattle scored twice on transitions within nine minutes with goals by Ruidíaz and Lodeiro. In the second half, Ruidíaz scored his second from just outside the 18-yard (16 m) box. The team kept their lead and stifled the LAFC offense, led by MLS scoring leader Carlos Vela, to complete a 3–1 upset victory that returned the Sounders to the MLS Cup final.

=== Toronto FC ===
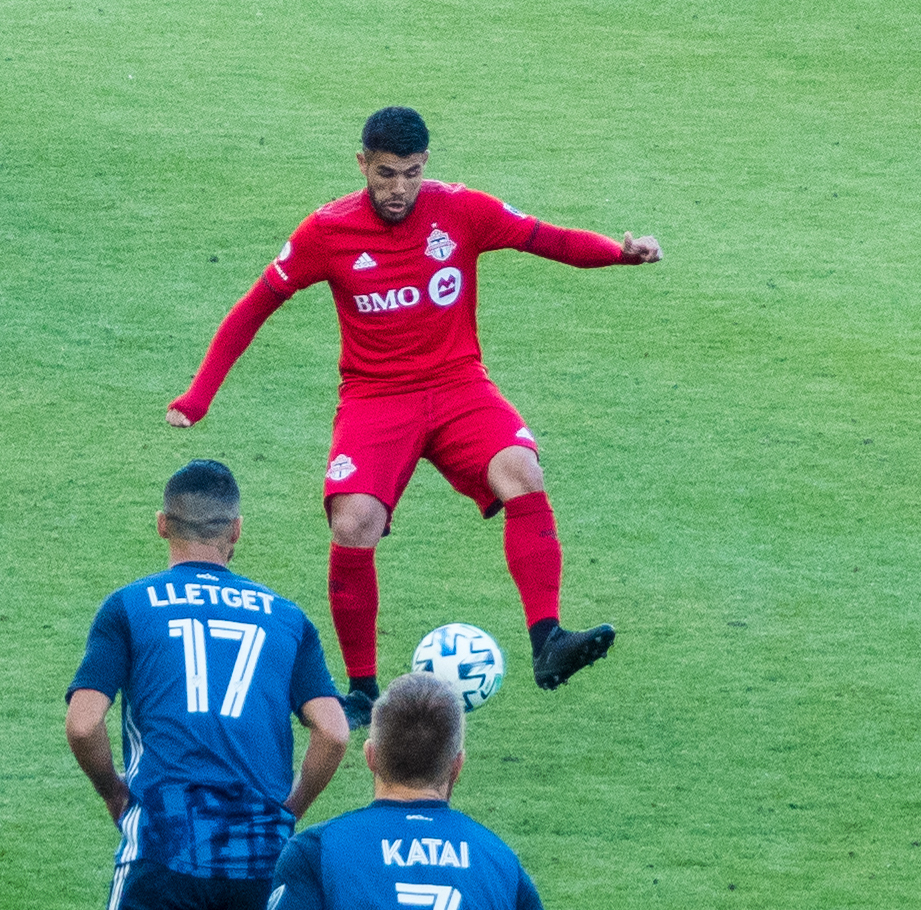
Attacking midfielder Alejandro Pozuelo (in red) was signed by Toronto FC before the 2019 season.

Toronto FC won their first MLS Cup in 2017 and completed the first domestic treble in MLS history, as they had also won the Supporters' Shield and Canadian Championship during the same season. The team finished the 2018 season in ninth place in the Eastern Conference, failing to qualify for the playoffs, and lost key players Sebastian Giovinco and Víctor Vázquez to teams in the Middle East. General manager of five years Tim Bezbatchenko also left the club to take on a role with Columbus Crew SC, but head coach Greg Vanney remained for his sixth season with Toronto.

During the preseason, Toronto's new general manager Ali Curtis signed several MLS returnees, including midfielder Nick DeLeon and defender Laurent Ciman. The club also acquired attacking midfielder Alejandro Pozuelo from Genk on a Designated Player contract. The club began their season in the CONCACAF Champions League, having qualified as the winners of the Canadian Championship; they lost 5–1 on aggregate to Panamanian club Club Independiente in the round of 16. Toronto opened the MLS regular season with three wins against Eastern Conference opponents, tying a franchise record for best start. In their next thirteen games, they earned only two more wins and went on an eight-match winless streak.

Several key players were called away to their national teams for the Gold Cup but returned to begin the second half of the season with four wins in eight matches by the end of July. During the summer transfer window, Toronto signed U.S. defender Omar Gonzalez on his return from Liga MX, Venezuelan midfielder Erickson Gallardo, and midfielder Nicolas Benezet on loan from French club Guingamp. Gonzalez's addition alongside Patrick Mullins provided additional depth for the team's defense, which had struggled during the Gold Cup window. In their last ten regular season matches, Toronto went undefeated with four wins and six draws, finishing fourth in the Eastern Conference. Forward Jozy Altidore left the final match of the regular season with a quadriceps injury that kept him out of the playoffs. The team also lost the Canadian Championship Final to the Montreal Impact in September, leaving them without a berth in the 2020 CONCACAF Champions League.

In the first round of the playoffs, Toronto hosted fifth-place D.C. United at BMO Field. They took a half-time lead through a goal by Marky Delgado, who capitalized on a goalkeeping mistake from Bill Hamid. Lucas Rodríguez equalized for D.C. in stoppage time at the end of the second half, forcing the match into extra time. Toronto then scored four unanswered goals, including two in the first five minutes from Richie Laryea and Jonathan Osorio. Osorio added his second in the 103rd minute and was followed two minutes later by Nick DeLeon to complete a 5–1 victory in the first half of extra time.

The team traveled to play top-seeded New York City FC (NYCFC) in the Conference Semifinals, earning a 2–1 victory at Citi Field. After a scoreless first half, Pozuelo scored two minutes into the second half after a misplayed header from New York's Maxime Chanot fell to him. NYCFC equalized through a shot by Ismael Tajouri-Shradi, who made a late run into the box in the 69th minute, but Toronto earned a penalty in the 90th minute that was converted by Pozuelo with a Panenka for a 2–1 win. Toronto continued to the Eastern Conference Final, where they faced defending MLS Cup champions Atlanta United FC at their home stadium. Atlanta took the lead in the fourth minute through a goal by Julian Gressel. Minutes later, Atlanta was awarded a penalty kick for a foul by Michael Bradley, but the 11th-minute penalty taken by Josef Martínez was saved by goalkeeper Quentin Westberg. Two minutes later, Benezet scored with a curling shot from the edge of the box to equalize for Toronto. Toronto completed their 2–1 upset victory with a 25-yard (75 ft) strike from Nick DeLeon that beat goalkeeper Brad Guzan. The team reached the MLS Cup final, their third in four seasons, on a thirteen-match unbeaten streak across MLS competitions.

=== Summary of results ===
Note: In all results below, the score of the finalist is given first (H: home; A: away).

Seattle Sounders FC		Round	Toronto FC	
2nd place in Western Conference 2019 MLS Western Conference standings: Pos / Team / Pld / Pts; 1 / Los Angeles FC / 34 / 72; 2 / Seattle Sounders FC / 34 / 56; 3 / Real Salt Lake / 34 / 53; 4 / Minnesota United FC / 34 / 53; 5 / LA Galaxy / 34 / 51; 6 / Portland Timbers / 34 / 49; 7 / FC Dallas / 34 / 48; Source: MLS		Regular season	4th place in Eastern Conference 2019 MLS Eastern Conference standings: Pos / Team / Pld / Pts; 1 / New York City FC / 34 / 64; 2 / Atlanta United FC / 34 / 58; 3 / Philadelphia Union / 34 / 55; 4 / Toronto FC / 34 / 50; 5 / D.C. United / 34 / 50; 6 / New York Red Bulls / 34 / 48; 7 / New England Revolution / 34 / 45; Source: MLS	
Opponent	Score	MLS Cup playoffs	Opponent	Score
FC Dallas	4–3 (a.e.t.) (H)	First round	D.C. United	5–1 (a.e.t.) (H)
Real Salt Lake	2–0 (H)	Conference Semifinals	New York City FC	2–1 (A)
Los Angeles FC	3–1 (A)	Conference Finals	Atlanta United FC	2–1 (A)

== Venue and preparations ==
MLS Cup 2019 was hosted by the Sounders at their home stadium, CenturyLink Field in Seattle, Washington. The Sounders had finished the regular season with six more points than Toronto and earned the right to host the final. It was the venue's second time as MLS Cup host, as it hosted the 2009 edition a decade prior as the neutral-site venue. The 69,000-seat stadium opened in 2002 as a shared venue for the National Football League's Seattle Seahawks and a future MLS team that became the Sounders seven years later.

The Sounders announced that they would open all seating areas in the stadium's upper deck for the MLS Cup final, making a total of 69,000 seats available, a change from earlier playoff games that were limited to 37,722 seats. Tickets were distributed to season ticket holders after the Eastern Conference Final, selling 50,000 seats, and were released for public sale beginning November 1. The remaining tickets sold out within 20 minutes of the public release, including 3,000 allocated to away fans by the league. Prices for tickets on secondary markets peaked at an average of $622, surpassing all but one Seattle sporting event on SeatGeek. The club released a limited number of standing-room only tickets at the box office prior to the match; those also sold out.

The Sounders hosted several fan events during the MLS Cup weekend, including the installation of a giant replica of the Philip F. Anschutz Trophy at Pike Place Market and the lighting of several city landmarks in the team's primary color, rave green. The MLS Cup trophy was also taken on a tour of the city and displayed at several landmarks, arriving aboard a state ferry and being sent with former Sounders goalkeeper Kasey Keller to the Space Needle. The club also organized a viewing party and rally at Occidental Park with a concert by Sounders minority owner Macklemore and appearances by local sports stars. A set of seismographs was temporarily installed inside and outside the stadium by the Pacific Northwest Seismic Network to record fan reactions to events; they recorded three large spikes corresponding to the three goals, which generated activity comparable to the Beast Quake at an NFL playoffs game in 2011.

Sound Transit ran several special Sounder commuter train trips to King Street Station to accommodate the expected number of fans. A scheduled closure on State Route 520 between Seattle and the Eastside was modified to allow Seattle-bound traffic to travel on the day of the match.

== Broadcasting ==
The match was broadcast in the United States in English on ABC and in Spanish on Univision; ABC would carry the match on its over-the-air stations for the first time since 2008. In Canada, coverage was provided by TSN4 in English and TVA Sports in French. In Central and South America, the match was broadcast by ESPN International in Spanish and Portuguese.

On ABC, ESPN's Jon Champion called the play-by-play with color commentator Taylor Twellman, who also hosted previews on SportsCenter and ESPN+. The Univision broadcast featured Jorge Luis López Salido, Raúl Guzmán, Diego Balado, and Marcelo Balboa. The TSN broadcast, which included a simulcast on TSN Radio 1050 in the Toronto area, was headlined by play-by-play commentator Luke Wileman and color analyst Steven Caldwell. On ESPN International, Spanish commentary was provided by Mauricio Pedroza and Herculez Gomez in Central America, and Hernán De Lorenzi and Pedro Wolff in South America. Portuguese commentary was done by Everaldo Marques and Gustavo Hofman.

The ABC broadcast averaged 823,000 viewers and peaked in the second half with 1.1 million viewers, including a 13.2 local rating in the Seattle–Tacoma market. The Univision broadcast averaged 447,000 viewers; the TSN4 broadcast in Canada averaged 748,000 viewers.

== Match ==
=== Summary ===
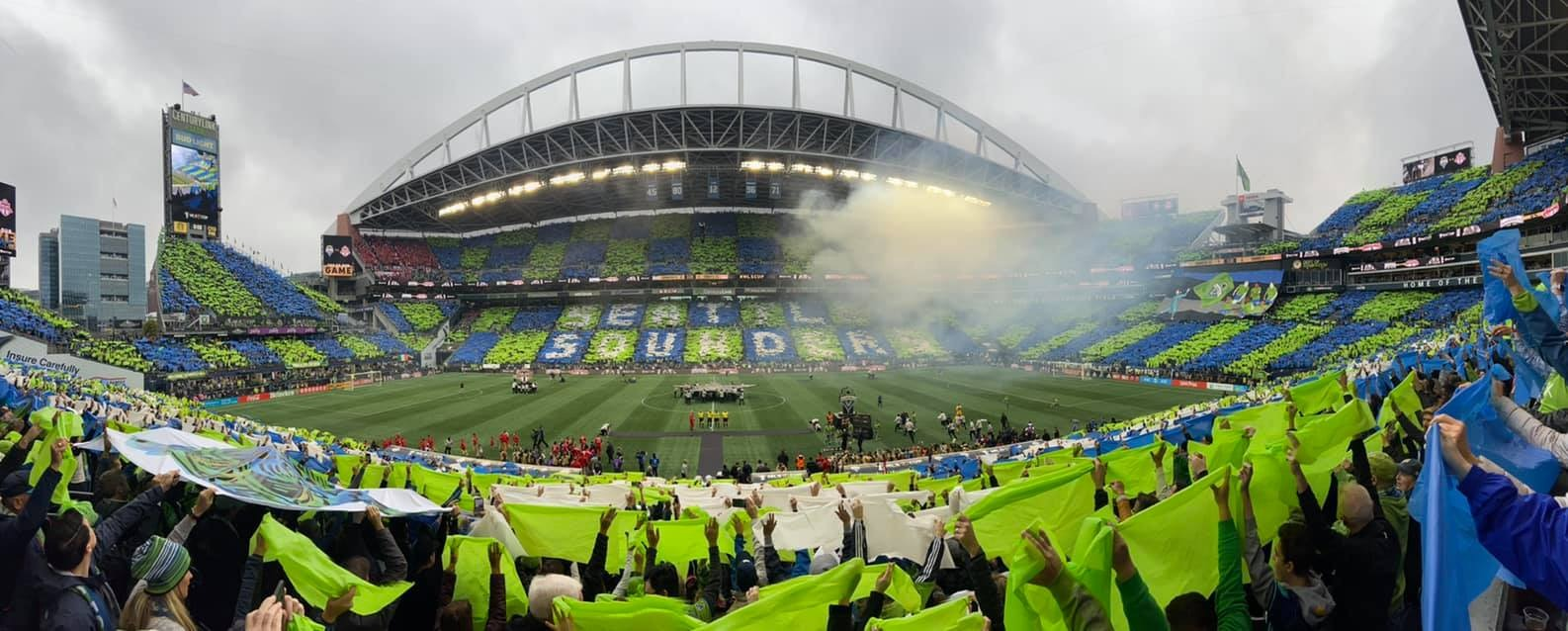
A tifo and card display prior to the match

The match began at 12:08 p.m. local time, with cloudy skies and a kickoff temperature of 53 °F (12 °C). The U.S. national anthem was performed by Pearl Jam's Mike McCready on his electric guitar as the Emerald City Supporters unveiled a tifo that was choreographed with a card display from the entire stadium. Both teams fielded most of their regular starting lineups, with Seattle's Román Torres in place of Xavier Arreaga and the replacement of Toronto defender Laurent Ciman with Omar Gonzalez. Allen Chapman was assigned as the head referee for the match, reprising his role from the 2017 Toronto–Seattle final.

Toronto had the majority of possession and attacking chances in the first half while in their 4–3–3 formation, while the Sounders responded with counterattacks and defending from turnovers. Seattle goalkeeper Stefan Frei made several saves, including blocks on a pair of shots by Nicolas Benezet and another from Jonathan Osorio, as Toronto controlled possession and made deep runs throughout the first half. In the last minute before first half stoppage time, Sounders forward Raúl Ruidíaz broke away from Toronto defender Omar Gonzalez with a chance to score, but his shot was blocked by the legs of goalkeeper Quentin Westberg.

Seattle manager Brian Schmetzer responded at halftime by moving Jordan Morris to the right wing and Joevin Jones to the left, while Toronto made no significant adjustments. The Sounders were able to disrupt Toronto's attacks with runs from the wings and broke the scoring deadlock in the 57th minute by right-back Kelvin Leerdam. He collected a ball from Ruidíaz and attempted a cross to the back-post that was instead deflected into the goal by Toronto defender Justin Morrow. Toronto's players protested that the goal was preceded by a foul on Osorio by Cristian Roldan, but the goal stood and was awarded to Leerdam by match officials after confusion over whether it counted as an own goal. Toronto manager Greg Vanney responded by substituting Benezet for forward Jozy Altidore, who had missed the playoffs with an injury.

The attacking momentum of the match changed in Seattle's favor, as the Sounders found several chances that they were unable to finish. Víctor Rodríguez, who had entered the match as a substitute in the 60th minute, added a second goal for Seattle in the 76th minute with a strike from atop the penalty area after a laid-off ball from Nicolás Lodeiro. In the 87th minute, Toronto unsuccessfully attempted to halve the lead with a header from Omar Gonzalez that went wide as he collided with Sounders goalkeeper Stefan Frei. At the end of regulation time, Ruidíaz out-muscled Chris Mavinga while chasing a long overhead ball from Gustav Svensson and beat Westberg to score the team's third and final goal of the match. Altidore earned a consolation goal for Toronto with a header in the third minute of stoppage time as the match ended with a 3–1 scoreline.

=== Details ===
November 10, 2019
12:00 p.m. PST

Seattle Sounders FC	3–1	Toronto FC
Leerdam 57'; Rodríguez 76'; Ruidíaz 90'	Report	Altidore 90+3'

CenturyLink Field, Seattle, Washington
Attendance: 69,274
Referee: Allen Chapman

Seattle Sounders FC	Toronto FC

GK	24	(Switzerland) Stefan Frei
RB	18	(Netherlands) Kelvin Leerdam
CB	29	(Panama) Román Torres
CB	20	(South Korea) Kim Kee-hee
LB	11	(Australia) Brad Smith		(substituted off) 61'
CM	4	(Sweden) Gustav Svensson
CM	7	(United States) Cristian Roldan
RW	33	(Trinidad and Tobago) Joevin Jones
AM	10	(Uruguay) Nicolás Lodeiro (c)
LW	13	(United States) Jordan Morris		(substituted off) 85'
CF	9	(Peru) Raúl Ruidíaz	(yellow card) 90+1'	(substituted off) 90+2'
Substitutes:
GK	35	(United States) Bryan Meredith
DF	5	(Cameroon) Nouhou Tolo
DF	25	(Ecuador) Xavier Arreaga		(substituted on) 90+2'
MF	8	(Spain) Víctor Rodríguez		(substituted on) 61'
MF	19	(United States) Harry Shipp
MF	21	(Martinique) Jordy Delem		(substituted on) 85'
FW	23	(Mexico) Luis Silva
Manager:
(United States) Brian Schmetzer

GK	16	(United States) Quentin Westberg
RB	96	(Brazil) Auro Jr.
CB	23	(Democratic Republic of the Congo) Chris Mavinga
CB	44	(United States) Omar Gonzalez
LB	2	(United States) Justin Morrow
CM	8	(United States) Mark Delgado
CM	4	(United States) Michael Bradley (c)
CM	21	(Canada) Jonathan Osorio		(substituted off) 77'
RW	31	(Japan) Tsubasa Endoh		(substituted off) 62'
CF	10	(Spain) Alejandro Pozuelo	(yellow card) 72'
LW	7	(France) Nicolas Benezet		(substituted off) 68'
Substitutes:
GK	25	(United States) Alex Bono
DF	26	(Belgium) Laurent Ciman
MF	18	(United States) Nick DeLeon		(substituted on) 62'
MF	22	(Canada) Richie Laryea		(substituted on) 77'
FW	9	(Venezuela) Erickson Gallardo
FW	13	(United States) Patrick Mullins
FW	17	(United States) Jozy Altidore		(substituted on) 68'
Manager:
(United States) Greg Vanney

MLS Cup MVP:
Víctor Rodríguez (Seattle Sounders FC)

Assistant referees:
Brian Dunn
Corey Rockwell
Fourth official:
Rubiel Vazquez
Reserve assistant referee:
Brian Poeschel
Video assistant referee:
Edvin Jurisevic
Assistant video assistant referee:
Cameron Blanchard

Match rules

- 90 minutes
- 30 minutes of extra time if necessary
- Penalty shootout if scores still level
- Seven named substitutes
- Maximum of three substitutions, with a fourth allowed in extra time

== Post-match ==
The players persevered because again it was the first half that you know we needed to make some adjustments, and they never quit, and the fans never stopped believing. So I'm very very happy and proud for the city and the fans.

— Brian Schmetzer at the post-game press conference

The Sounders became the sixth team to win multiple MLS Cup titles and ended a 267-minute scoreless streak in MLS Cup play with Leerdam's goal. The match was the first MLS Cup final since the 2012 edition to feature four or more goals. The announced attendance of 69,274 was the second-highest for an MLS Cup final. The match set a new record for sporting event attendance at CenturyLink Field as well as soccer in the state of Washington. Sounders midfielder Víctor Rodríguez was named the MLS Cup Most Valuable Player for scoring the winning goal; he left the club less than two weeks later with the intent of returning to his native Spain.

A victory parade took place on November 12 in Downtown Seattle, running from Westlake Park to a rally at the Seattle Center, and was attended by thousands of fans. The club's two MLS Cup trophies also made several stops around Seattle landmarks as part of a victory tour for fans, including several trips on the state ferry system. The Washington state delegation to the United States Congress introduced congratulatory resolutions to honor the Sounders and their successful season.

As MLS Cup champions, the Sounders earned $275,000 in prize money, while Toronto earned $80,000. Seattle also earned a berth in the 2020 CONCACAF Champions League, despite having already qualified in another slot as the highest-ranked regular season team to remain in the playoffs. They were eliminated in the Round of 16 by Honduran club C.D. Olimpia in a penalty shootout at CenturyLink Field following a 4–4 tie on aggregate. The Sounders were also scheduled to host the 2020 Campeones Cup in August against the winner of the Mexican Campeón de Campeones, but the match was cancelled due to the COVID-19 pandemic. The Sounders also went on to play in the 2020 edition of the MLS Cup after a shortened season due to the COVID-19 pandemic. They were unable to defend their title, losing 3–0 to hosts Columbus Crew SC.
