= Hartford S.C. =

- Nickname: Kings
- Founded: 1964
- Dissolved: 1968
- Stadium: Dillon Stadium; Hartford, Connecticut
- Manager: Paul Pantano
- League: American Soccer League

Hartford S.C. was an American soccer club based in Hartford, Connecticut that was a member of the American Soccer League. They were league champions in 1964-65, led by coach of the year Paul Pantano.

For the 1966/67 and 1968 seasons the team was known as the Hartford Kings.

== Year-by-year ==
Year	Games	Wins	Draws	Loses	Division	League	Reg. season	Playoffs	U.S. Open Cup
Hartford S.C.
1964/65	9	8	0	1	N/A	ASL	1st	Champion (no playoff)	?
1965/66	15	7	3	5	N/A	ASL	5th	No playoff	?
Hartford Kings
1966/67	11	2	1	8	2	ASL	6th, North	Did not qualify	Did not enter
1967/68	5	2	1	2	2	ASL	Withdrew early in the season		Did not enter
1968	13	2	0	11	2	ASL	6th	Did not qualify	Did not enter
