= Canadian soccer clubs in international competitions =

This is a list of Canadian soccer clubs in international competitions. Canadian clubs have participated in competitive international soccer competitions since at least 1975 when the Serbian White Eagles entered the 1975 CONCACAF Champions' Cup.

No Canadian team has won any CONCACAF competition but CF Montréal (then the Montreal Impact; 2015), Toronto FC (2018), and Vancouver Whitecaps FC (2025), reached the finals of the CONCACAF Champions Cup. Toronto FC lost the 2018 edition of the Campeones Cup – a super cup against the Mexican league champions.

== Qualification for CONCACAF competitions ==
Starting in 2023, at least three Canadian clubs qualify for each edition of the CONCACAF Champions Cup:

- The Canadian Premier League champion
- The Canadian Premier League regular season winner
- The Canadian Championship champion

Canadian MLS clubs can also qualify through Major League Soccer or Leagues Cup. If a CPL club were to win the league championship and the regular season, the CPL regular season runner-up would qualify in the second slot. If the Canadian Championship winner has qualified through any other method, then the runner-up would fill the slot; should the runner-up have already qualified, then the highest ranked semifinalist would earn the slot.

== Cups and finals ==
=== CONCACAF Champions Cup / Champions League ===
Team	Winners	Runners-up	Years won	Years runner-up	Ref.
CF Montréal	0	1		2015	
Toronto FC	0	1		2018	
Vancouver Whitecaps FC	0	1		2025	

=== Campeones Cup ===
Team	Winners	Runners-up	Years won	Years runner-up
Toronto FC	0	1		2018

== Full international record ==
=== CONCACAF Champions Cup / Champions League ===
Year	Team	Starting round	Progress
1975	Serbian White Eagles	First round	First round
1976	Serbian White Eagles	Second round	Second round (Note: Withdrew)
1976	Toronto Italia	First round	Third round
1992	Vancouver 86ers	First round	First round
2008–09	Montreal Impact	Preliminary round	Quarter-finals
2009–10	Toronto FC	Preliminary round	Preliminary round
2010–11	Toronto FC	Preliminary round	3rd in group stage
2011–12	Toronto FC	Preliminary round	Semi-finals
2012–13	Toronto FC	Group stage	2nd in group stage
2013–14	Montreal Impact	Group stage	2nd in group stage
2014–15	Montreal Impact	Group stage	Runners-up
2015–16	Vancouver Whitecaps FC	Group stage	3rd in group stage
2016–17	Vancouver Whitecaps FC	Group stage	Semi-finals
2018	Toronto FC	Round of 16	Runners-up
2019	Toronto FC	Round of 16	Round of 16
2020	Montreal Impact	Round of 16	Quarter-finals
2021	Toronto FC	Round of 16	Quarter-finals
2022	Forge FC	Round of 16	Round of 16
2022	CF Montréal	Round of 16	Quarter-finals
2023	Vancouver Whitecaps FC	Round of 16	Quarter-finals
2024	Cavalry FC	Round one	Round one
2024	Forge FC	Round one	Round one
2024	Vancouver Whitecaps FC	Round one	Round one
2025	Cavalry FC	Round one	Round one
2025	Forge FC	Round one	Round one
2025	Vancouver Whitecaps FC	Round one	Runners-up
2026	Atlético Ottawa	Round one	Round one
2026	Forge FC	Round one	Round one
2026	Vancouver FC	Round one	Round one
2026	Vancouver Whitecaps FC	Round one	Round of 16
2027	Atlético Ottawa	Round one	TBD
2027	Cavalry FC	Round one	TBD
2027	Forge FC	Round one	TBD
2027	Vancouver Whitecaps FC	TBD	TBD

=== CONCACAF W Champions Cup ===
Year	Team	Starting round	Progress
2024–25	Whitecaps FC Girls Elite Academy	Preliminary round	Group stage
2025–26	Vancouver Rise FC Academy	Group stage	Group stage

=== Leagues Cup ===
Year	Team	Progress
2020	Toronto FC	Cancelled
2023	CF Montréal	Group stage
2023	Toronto FC	Group stage
2023	Vancouver Whitecaps FC	Round of 32
2024	CF Montréal	Round of 32
2024	Toronto FC	Round of 32
2024	Vancouver Whitecaps FC	Round of 32
2025	CF Montréal	League phase
2026	Vancouver Whitecaps FC	League phase

=== CONCACAF League ===
Year	Team	Progress
2019	Forge FC	Round of 16
2020	Forge FC	Quarter-finals (Lost in CCL play-in round)
2021	Forge FC	Semi-finals (Qualified for CCL)
2022	Pacific FC	Round of 16

=== Campeones Cup ===
Year	Team	Score	Opponents
2018	Toronto FC	1–3	(Mexico) UANL

=== North American Club Championship ===
Year	Team	Score	Opponents
1990	Vancouver 86ers	3–2	(United States) Maryland Bays

=== Professional Cup ===
Year	Team	Progress
1992	Vancouver 86ers	First round
1992	Montreal Supra	First round

=== Pacific Coast International Championship ===
Year	Team	Progress
1961	Westminster Royals	Runner-up
1962	Vancouver Firefighters	Champions
1963	Vancouver Molson Canadians	Runner-up
1964	Vancouver British Columbia	Runner-up
1965	Vancouver Firefighters	3rd place
1966	Vancouver Firefighters	Champions
1967	Victoria O'Keefe's	Champions

== Appearances in CONCACAF competitions ==
=== Men ===
As of March 20, 2026

Modern era (2008–present)
Club	Total						CCC	CL	First appearance	Last appearance
Club	Apps	Pld	W	D	L	Win%	CCC	CL	First appearance	Last appearance
Atlético Ottawa	1	2	0	0	2	0.00	1	0	2026 CONCACAF Champions Cup	2026 CONCACAF Champions Cup
Cavalry FC	2	4	1	0	3	25.00	1	0	2024 CONCACAF Champions Cup	2025 CONCACAF Champions Cup
Forge FC	7	24	7	7	10	29.17	4	3	2019 CONCACAF League	2026 CONCACAF Champions Cup
CF Montréal (Note: Includes both the records of the NASL/USL era club, and the current club)	5	32	13	9	10	40.63	5	0	2008–09 CONCACAF Champions League	2022 CONCACAF Champions League
Pacific FC	1	4	2	1	1	50.00	0	1	2022 CONCACAF League	2022 CONCACAF League
Toronto FC	7	40	16	11	13	40.00	7	0	2009–10 CONCACAF Champions League	2021 CONCACAF Champions League
Vancouver FC	1	2	0	0	2	0.00	1	0	2026 CONCACAF Champions Cup	2026 CONCACAF Champions Cup
Vancouver Whitecaps FC	6	31	11	8	12	35.48	6	0	2015–16 CONCACAF Champions League	2026 CONCACAF Champions Cup

Historical era (1975–2008)
Club	Total (Note: Does not include results that were walkovers)						CONCACAF Champions' Cup appearances
Club	Apps	Pld	W	D	L	Win%	CONCACAF Champions' Cup appearances
Serbian White Eagles	2	2	0	1	1	0.00	1975, 1976
Toronto Italia	1	2	2	0	0	100.00	1976
Vancouver 86ers	1	0	0	0	0	—	1992

=== Women ===
As of October 16, 2025

Appearances at the CONCACAF W Champions Cup
Club	Total						First appearance	Last appearance
Club	Apps	Pld	W	D	L	Win%	First appearance	Last appearance
Whitecaps FC Girls Elite Academy	2	9	3	0	6	33.33	2024–25	2025–26

== Summer Olympics ==
Year	Team	Round	Progress
1904	Galt F.C.	Group stage	Champion

== See also ==
- MLS performance in the CONCACAF Champions Cup
