= 2020 Campeones Cup =

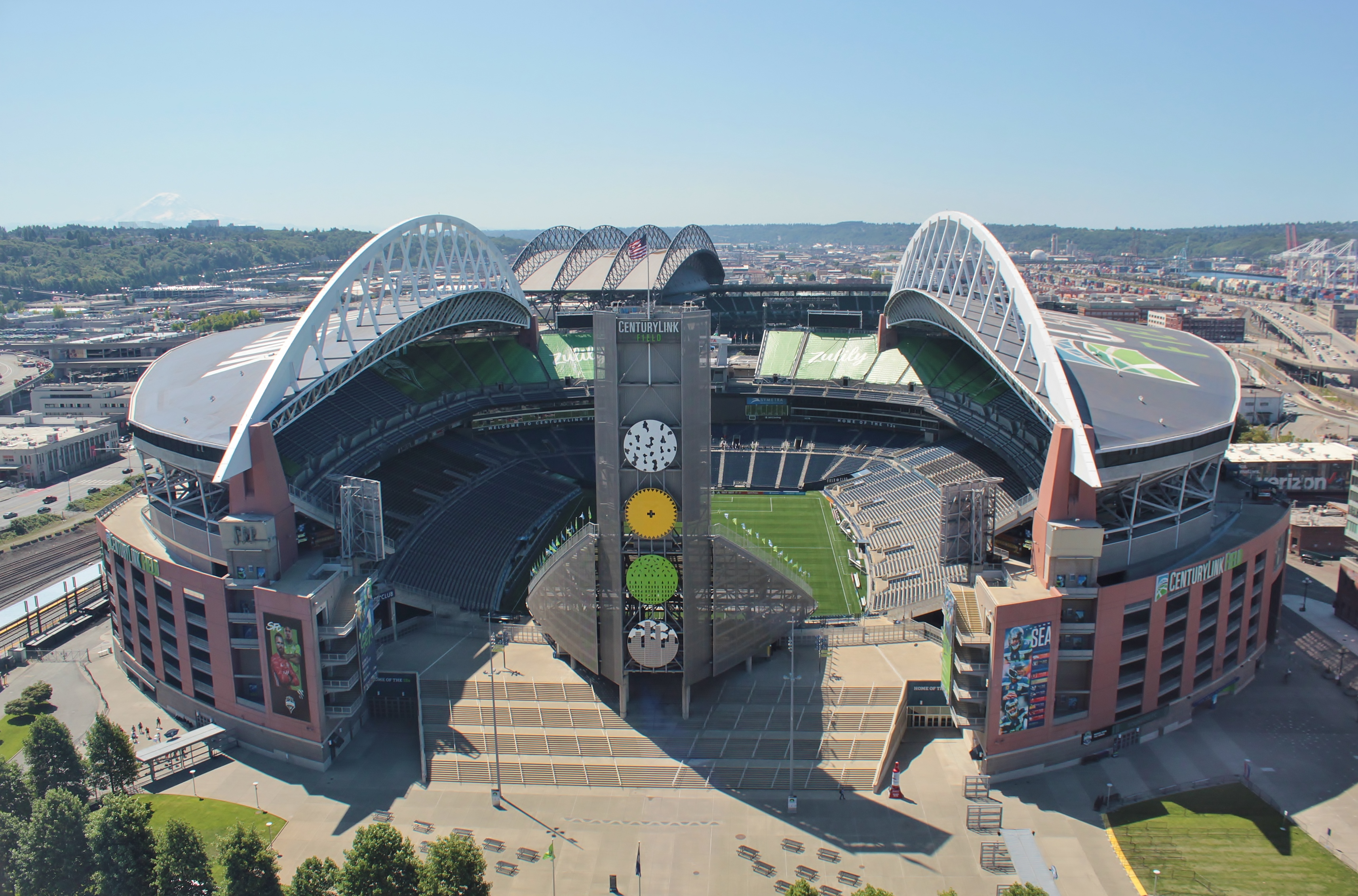
- CenturyLink Field in Seattle, Washington was the planned host of the match
- Event: Campeones Cup
Seattle Sounders FC	Never determined
(United States)	(Mexico)
- Canceled due to COVID-19 pandemic
- Date: August 12, 2020
- Venue: CenturyLink Field, Seattle, Washington

The 2020 Campeones Cup was planned to be the third edition of the Campeones Cup, an annual North American football match contested between the champions of the previous Major League Soccer season and the winner of the Campeón de Campeones from Liga MX.

The match would have featured Seattle Sounders FC, winners of the MLS Cup 2019, and the winners of the 2020 Campeón de Campeones—either C.F. Monterrey or another Liga MX side. Seattle Sounders FC were planned to host the match at CenturyLink Field in Seattle, Washington, United States, on August 12, 2020. The Campeones Cup, Leagues Cup, and MLS All-Star Game were canceled on May 19, 2020, to provide more available match dates as the regular season resumed following a suspension due to the COVID-19 pandemic.

== Match ==
=== Details ===
August 12, 2020

Seattle Sounders FC (United States)	Canceled	(Mexico) 2020 Campeón de Campeones winner

CenturyLink Field, Seattle, Washington
