= 1964–65 Eastern Professional Soccer Conference season =

Eastern Professional Soccer Conference
- Season: 1964-65
- Champions: North Division - BW Gottschee, South Division - New York Ukrainians

Statistics of Eastern Professional Soccer Conference in season 1964/1965.

== League standings ==
                          G   W   T   L   GF  GA  PTS
    North Division
BW Gottschee              16   9   1   6   27  22  19
German-Hungarians         14   8   2   4   37  27  18
Giuliana                  15   6   5   4   31  26  17
New York Hungaria         15   7   3   5   34  29  17
Boston Metros             13   5   3   5   24  21  13
Newark Ukrainians         15   1   2  12   13  42   4

    South Division
New York Ukrainians       15   9   3   3   33  12  21
New York Inter            16   8   5   3   31  28  21
Ukrainian Nationals       14   7   5   2   30  14  19
New York Hota             15   6   5   4   21  17  17
New York Americans        16   4   4   8   21  34  12
Greek-Americans           13   3   3   7   21  30   9
Minerva-Pfuelzer          17   3   1  13   15  36   7
