= Washington Darts =

Defunct American soccer club

- Full name: Washington Darts
- Nickname: Darts
- Founded: 1967
- Dissolved: 1971 (rebranded to Miami Gatos)
- Stadium: Brookland Stadium, Washington, D.C.
- Capacity: 30,000
- Chairman: William Cousins Jr.
- General Manager: Norman Sutherland
- League: ASL (1967–69); NASL (1970–71)
Home colors	Away colors

The Washington Darts were an American soccer club based in Washington, D.C. that played in the American Soccer League from 1967 to 1969 and the North American Soccer League in the 1970 and 1971 seasons, though in 1967 they were known as Washington Britannica. They won two ASL championships and played for the NASL championship once. They also won the 1970 NASL International Cup. The club left Washington after 1971 and became the Miami Gatos (1972), Miami Toros (1973–76), Ft. Lauderdale Strikers (1977–83), and Minnesota Strikers (1984), in the NASL's final season. The club's colors were blue, white and gray.

== History ==
In December 1963, Scottish immigrant Norman Sutherland and soccer players in the Washington, D.C. area created the amateur team, Washington Britannica. In 1967, the team went professional when it joined the American Soccer League. In 1968, they changed their name to the Washington Darts. Following the 1969 season, after winning two consecutive league titles, the Darts left the ASL to join the first division of the American soccer pyramid at the time, the North American Soccer League. After the 1971 NASL season, the team moved to Miami becoming the Miami Gatos.

In 1968, they played their home games at Woodrow Wilson Stadium on the campus of Woodrow Wilson High School on Nebraska Avenue NW. In 1969 they moved their home games to Brookland Stadium on the campus of Catholic University. In 1970 they also played three matches against international teams at RFK Stadium.

In 1968 the Darts became the first professional soccer team to have a black coach in U.S. history when Lincoln Phillips, the goalkeeper, became player-coach.

In 1970, NASL teams rounded out their schedules by playing an assortment of foreign teams including Hoepel from Israel, Varzim from Portugal, Hertha Berlin from Germany and England's Coventry City. These games weren't just for attendance but also counted in the standings. The Washington Darts went 2-2-0 versus the international teams earning the "International Cup". Many teams also played games against Pelé and his Brazilian squad, Santos FC. The 1970 game against Pelé and Santos crushed the Darts previous attendance record of 6,215 against Hapoel Petah Tikva F.C., with 13,878 fans in attendance at RFK Stadium. It was the largest crowd to ever watch a Darts match.

Today, a Washington club soccer team pays tribute to the Darts' legacy via their name: The D.C. Darts.

== Club colors ==
During their time in the NASL, the Darts home colors were gray with blue sleeves, and the away colors were blue.

== Year-by-year ==
Year	Division	League	W	L	T	Pts	Reg. season	Playoffs
1967–68	2	ASL	7	6	2	16	2nd(t), First Division	out of playoffs
1968	2	ASL	9	1	1	19	1st	Champions (no playoff)
1969	2	ASL	14	1	5	33	1st, Southern Division	Won Championship (Syracuse)
1970	1	NASL	14	6	4	137	1st, Southern Division	Lost Championship (Rochester)
1971 indoor	1	NASL	0	2	0	n/a	4th place	Lost 3rd place match (St. Louis)
1971	1	NASL	8	6	10	111	3rd, Southern Division	out of playoffs

== Coaches ==
- (Trinidad and Tobago) Lincoln Phillips (1968–1970)

== See also ==
- Washington Whips
- Washington Diplomats
- Team America (NASL)
- Miami Gatos 1972
- Miami Toros 1973–76
- Fort Lauderdale Strikers 1977–83
- Minnesota Strikers 1984
- D.C. United
