= Brooklyn Italians =

Brooklyn Italians SC
- Full name: Brooklyn Italians Soccer Club
- Nickname: Italians
- Founded: 1949; 77 years ago
- Stadium: John Dewey High School; Brooklyn, New York City
- Capacity: ~1,000
- President: Peter Ciaccia
- Technical Director: Antonio Superbia Jr
- League: USL Academy League
- 2025: ?
- Website: brooklynitalians.org
Home colors

Brooklyn Italians SC is an American soccer team based in Brooklyn, New York City, New York, United States. Founded in 1949, the team has won two Lamar Hunt U.S. Open Cup (1979, 1991), making it the last team from New York to have won the tournament. It last played professionally in the National Premier Soccer League (NPSL), the fourth tier of the American Soccer Pyramid, in the Northeast Atlantic Division during its 2019 season. The club is currently an academy affiliate of the New York Red Bulls and competes at the semi-professional level in the United Soccer League Academy.

== History ==
The Brooklyn Italians are generally regarded as one of the most successful semi-pro teams in the United States, with a linear history that now stretches back over 60 years. Founded in 1949 by John DeVivo, an Italian immigrant to the New York area, the team was originally part of the Metropolitan Soccer League in the early 1950s, before joining the American Soccer League prior to the 1956–57 season. The Italians finished seventh in their first season in the ASL behind champions New York Hakoah.

The Italians changed their name to the "Inter-Brooklyn Italians" when they merged with a local rival club in 1961, became "Inter SC" in 1962, and before the 1963 season the team changed its name again and became "Boca Juniors", named after the famous club in Argentina, but played just one season with this name before resigning from the ASL in 1964.

For the next 20 years or so the team continued to play in amateur leagues under various names – at one time or another were they known as "Palermo Football Club" and the "Brooklyn Dodgers" (after the former Brooklyn baseball team) – before reverting to their original name in 1991. They were also regular participants in the National Challenge Cup, winning the title twice during the pre-MLS all-amateur era, in 1979 (when they were still called the Dodgers) and 1991, and reaching the final in 1981 and 1990.

As a result of their success in the 1990 tournament, the Italians played in the qualifying rounds of the 1991 CONCACAF Champions' Cup. In April 1991, they beat Bermudian side Dandy Town Hornets 4–3 on aggregate; they withdrew before the second round of the tournament. In November 1991 they lost 6–1 on aggregate to Club Universidad de Guadalajara in the first round of the 1991 CONCACAF Cup Winners Cup.

The Italians joined the National Premier Soccer League in 2010, with head coach Joe Barone calling it "a new adventure".

In addition to the new NPSL side, the Italians continue to field a number of teams in the New York-based Cosmopolitan Soccer League. The Italians also regularly compete in various amateur tournaments world-wide, including the Memorial Claudio Sassi in Italy, the Dallas Cup, the President's Day Tournament in Phoenix, and college showcases across the country. International travel is encouraged, and teams have trained with many of the elite teams from Italy.

In 2020, the team was not listed among the clubs taking part in the 2020 NPSL season.

On May 5, 2021, the New York Red Bulls announced the Italians as an official Academy Affiliate.

== Year-by-year ==
Year	Division	League	Regular season	Playoffs	National Cup
1956–57	1	ASL	7th		
1957–58	1	ASL	10th		
1958–59	1	ASL	4th		
1959–60	1	ASL	4th	did not qualify	
1960–61	1	ASL	8th	did not qualify	
1961–62	1	ASL	2nd		
1962–63	1	ASL	2nd		
1963–64	1	ASL	4th		
1979	Exhibition club				Champions
1981	Exhibition club				Runner-up
1990	N/A	NESSL	2nd, North Division	Champion	Runner-up
1991	N/A	NESSL	1st, North Division	Runner-up	Champions
2010	4	NPSL	2nd, Atlantic	did not qualify	First round
2011	4	NPSL	1st, Atlantic	Divisional Final	First round
2012	4	NPSL	2nd, Atlantic	Divisional Semi-Final	Second round
2013	4	NPSL	1st, Atlantic	Divisional Semi-Final	First round
2014	4	NPSL	2nd, North Atlantic	Regional Semi-Final	Third round
2015	4	NPSL	4th, North Atlantic	did not qualify	First round
2016	4	NPSL	6th, Atlantic	did not qualify	did not qualify
2017	4	NPSL	2nd, Atlantic Blue	Conference Semi-Final	did not qualify
2018	4	NPSL	2nd, North Atlantic	Conference Final	First round
2019	4	NPSL	2nd, North Atlantic	Conference Final	did not qualify
2025	N/A	USL-A	N/A		

== Team names ==
- Brooklyn Italians (1949–1961)
- Inter-Brooklyn Italians (1961–1962)
- Inter SC (1962–1963)
- Boca Juniors (1963–1964)
- Brooklyn Dodgers / Palermo Football Club (varying names) (1964–1991)
- Brooklyn Italians (1991–present)

== Honors ==
- US Open Cup:
  - Champions: 1979, 1991 (considered US Soccer's National Championship at the time)
  - Runners-up: 1981, 1990
- American Soccer League:
  - Runners-up: 1961–62, 1962–63
- North Eastern Super Soccer League:
  - Champions: 1990
  - Runners-up: 1991
- Cosmopolitan Soccer League:
  - League Champions: 1976–1977, 1977–1978, 1980–1981, 1983–1984, 2005–2006, 2006–2007
  - Indoor Tournament Champions: 1977, 1984, 1985
- National Premier Soccer League Atlantic Division:
  - Champions: 2011, 2013
  - Participation in CONCACAF Champions' Cup: 1980, 1982, 1991
  - Participation in CONCACAF Cup Winners Cup: 1991

== Head coaches ==
- (Russia) Mike Ryback (1989–1991)
- (Argentina) Gilbert Godoy (1991–1992)
- (Italy) Joe Barone (2009–2010)
- (Italy) Tony Noto (2010–2011)
- (Italy) Lucio Russo (2011–2017)
- (England) Dominic Casciato (2017–21) - National Premier Soccer League (NPSL)
- (United States) Enzo Bertolotti (2025-26) - USL Academy

== Notable players ==
- Antonio Superbia Jr.
- Bill Manning
- Dragan Radovich
- Giovanni Savarese
- Giuseppe Barone (U.S. Salernitana)
- Joe Barone (ACF Fiorentina - Vice President)
- Juan Carlos Osorio (Coached New York Red Bulls, Chicago Fire & Mexico MNT
- Mike Windischmann U.S. MNT (1990 World Cup captain)
- Tim Parker (New York Red Bulls, Houston Dynamo FC)
- Vincent Bezecourt (New York Red Bulls, Miami FC

== Stadium ==
- Brooklyn College; Brooklyn, New York City (1989–1992; 2025-present)
- Dreier Offermann Park; Brooklyn, New York City (2009)
- John Dewey High School; Brooklyn, New York City (2010–2019)

== See also ==
- Soccer in New York City
