= Baltimore Flyers =

American soccer club based in Baltimore, Maryland, US

The Baltimore St. Gerards were an American soccer club based in Baltimore, Maryland that was a member of the American Soccer League.

Before the 1967/68 season the team was renamed the Baltimore Flyers.

== Year-by-year ==
Year	Division	League	Reg. season	Playoffs	U.S. Open Cup
1966/67	2	ASL	1st, South	Champion	Did not enter
1967/68	2	ASL	5th, First	Did not qualify	Did not enter
