= Boston Tigers =

Boston Metros were an American soccer club based in Boston, Massachusetts that were a member of the American Soccer League. In their second season, the Metros joined the Eastern Professional Soccer Conference. After the EPSC folded at the end of its only season, the Metros returned to the ASL as the Boston Tigers.

The club reached the quarter-finals of the 1964 National Challenge Cup, which ended in a 3–1 loss to Giuliana SC.

== Year-by-year ==
Year	Division	League	Reg. season	Playoffs	U.S. Open Cup
1963/64	N/A	ASL	2nd	No playoff	Quarterfinals
1964/65	N/A	EPSC	5th, North	No playoff	?
1965/66	N/A	ASL	6th	No playoff	?
1966/67	2	ASL	3rd, North	Did not qualify	Did not enter
1967/68	2	ASL	2nd, First	Playoffs	Did not enter
