= Roma S.C. =

Roma S.C. was an American soccer club based in Paterson, New Jersey that was a member of the American Soccer League.

== Year-by-year ==
Year	Division	League	Reg. season	Playoffs	U.S. Open Cup
1964/65	N/A	ASL	3rd	No playoff	?
1965/66	N/A	ASL	1st	Champion (no playoff)	?
1966/67	2	ASL	4th, North	Did not qualify	Semifinals
1967/68	2	ASL	4th, Premier	Did not qualify	?
