= Philadelphia Ukrainian Nationals SC =

Philadelphia Ukrainian Nationals
- Full name: Ukrainian Sports Association Philadelphia Tridents
- Nicknames: The Ukrainians; Tridents
- Founded: 1950; 76 years ago
- League: NPSL
- 2025: ?
- Website: ukrainiannationals.com
Home colors

Philadelphia Ukrainian Nationals Soccer Club, also known as the Philadelphia Ukrainians team, nicknamed the Philadelphia Tridents, Tryzub FC (Ukrainian Sports Association Philadelphia Tridents, in Ukrainian: УСО (Український Спортовий Осередок) «Тризуб» (Філадельфія). USO (Ukrainsky Sportovy Oseredok) «Tryzub» (Philadelphia)), is an American soccer club based in Philadelphia, Pennsylvania.

The club currently plays in NPSL, having previously a member of the American Soccer League. The Ukrainian Nationals were six (6) time American Soccer League Champions: in 1960-61, 1961–62, 1962–63, 1963–64, 1967–68 and 1970. The team's colors are red and black. The Philadelphia Ukrainian Nationals were the first team in United States history to have home games televised, and played in the first regulation indoor soccer game in Atlantic City's Convention Center in New Jersey.

Throughout its history the Philadelphia Ukrainian Nationals have hosted international friendly matches with teams such as Manchester United F.C., Austria Wien, VfB Stuttgart, Wolverhampton Wanderers F.C., Eintracht Frankfurt, Manchester City F.C., Dundee F.C. and Nottingham Forest F.C.

== History ==
=== Philadelphia Ukrainians ===
Old logo

The club was suspended by the USSFA one week into its first professional season, following a complaint by the Penn State Association.

Year-by-year

Year	Division	League	Reg. season	Playoffs	National Cup
1957/58	N/A	ASL	Suspended after 1 game	N/A	N/A

=== Ukrainian Nationals/Philadelphia Ukrainians ===
Alternate logo, in black and red.

The Ukrainian Nationals was an American soccer club based in Philadelphia, Pennsylvania that was a member of the American Soccer League.

After the Philadelphia Ukrainians was suspended a week into the season, a new Philadelphia franchise, the Ukrainian Nationals, was awarded and took the former Philadelphia Ukrainians' spot in the league.

For the 1964/65 second season, the club joined the "super-league" Eastern Professional Soccer Conference. After the EPSC folded at the end of its only season, the team returned to the ASL.

The club became known as the Philadelphia Ukrainians before the 1968 season.

After the 1970 season, the team moved to the amateur German American Soccer League.

The club completed the "double" in 1961 and 1963, winning the league and the National Challenge Cup. The club also won the league cup (the Lewis Cup) in 1959 and were runners-up in 1958 and 1963.

Year-by-year

Year	Division	League	Reg. season	Playoffs	National Cup
1957/58	N/A	ASL	2nd	No playoff	?
1958/59	N/A	ASL	2nd	No playoff	Semifinals
1959/60	N/A	ASL	2nd	No playoff	Champion
1960/61	N/A	ASL	1st	Champion (no playoff)	Champion
1961/62	N/A	ASL	1st	Champion (no playoff)	Semifinal
1962/63	N/A	ASL	1st	Champion (no playoff)	Champion
1963/64	N/A	ASL	1st	Champion (no playoff)	Final
1964/65	N/A	EPSC	3rd, South	No playoff	Semifinals
1965/66	N/A	ASL	3rd	No playoff	Champion
1966/67	2	ASL	2nd, North	did not qualify	Quarterfinals
1967/68	2	ASL	1st	Champion	Semifinals
1968	2	ASL	3rd	No playoffs	N/A
1969	2	ASL	3rd, Southern	No playoffs	did not enter
1970	2	ASL	1st	Champion (no playoff)	did not enter

== Honors ==
- American Soccer League Champion: 6

1960-61, 1961-62, 1962-63, 1963-64, 1967-68, 1970

- National Challenge Cup Winner: 4

1959-60, 1960-61, 1962-63, 1965-66

- CONCACAF Champions' Cup Quarterfinals: 1

1967

- Philadelphia Soccer League Champion: 1

1955-56
