= Newark Ukrainian Sitch =

- Full name: NJ Ukrainian Sitch SC
- Nicknames: The Ukrainians, Sitch
- Founded: 1924
- Ground: Glenside Field, Summit NJ
- Capacity: 1,500
- 2020/2021: 7th
- Website: sitchsports.com
Home colours	Away colours

Newark Ukrainian Sitch also known as "Newark Ukrainians" (Ukrainian Sports Educational Association "Chornomorska Sitch" Newark, Ukrainian: УСВТ (Українське спортивно-виховне товариство) «Чорноморська січ» (Ньюарк), romanized: USVT (Ukrainske Sportyvno-Vykhovne Tovarystvo) "Chornomorska Sitch" (Newark)) is an American soccer club based in Newark, New Jersey that was a member of the American Soccer League. Currently, the club participates in the Garden State Soccer League's top amateur "Super Division" under the name, "Ukrainian Sitch SC".

== History ==
The club has had a very storied history. The club was founded on 21 December 1924.

The team debuted on August 19, 1956, competing in the "B" Division of the New Jersey State Soccer League for the 1956/57 season. The team continued to play in the NJJSL until it joined the German-American Soccer League, and later the American Soccer League. For the 1964/65 season, the team joined the "Super-League" Eastern Professional Soccer Conference, and after the EPSC folded at the end of its only season, the team returned to the ASL where it competed until the 1970/71 season when it joined the Schaefer League. After the Schaefer League disbanded in the late 70s the team joined the Garden State Soccer League where it has competed in various divisions and continues to do so today.

Throughout the club's early tenure, the "Newark Ukrainians" won several competitions, tournaments and titles, the most notable being the Lewis Cup in 1962/63 & the Schaefer League in 1970/71.

During the same time, the team also played a number of friendly matches against visiting international clubs including Legia Warsaw, Poland, Dirmersheim, Karlsruhe, Germany, Skelmersdale United, West Lancashire, England, TuS Sennelager, Sennelager, Germany, and Arminia Bielefeld, Germany.

Sitch's most recent GSSL success came in the 2008/2009 season where it captured both the GSSL Semi-Pro Elite North League Title, and the GSSL League Cup.

== ASL Year-by-year ==
Year	Division	League	Reg. season	Playoffs	U.S. Open Cup
1962/63	N/A	ASL	5th	No playoff	?
1963/64	N/A	ASL	3rd	No playoff	?
1964/65	N/A	EPSC	6th, North	No playoff	?
1965/66	N/A	ASL	2nd	No playoff	Quarterfinals
1966/67	2	ASL	1st, North	Finals	Did not enter
1967/68	2	ASL	7th, First	Did not qualify	Did not enter
1968	2	ASL	7th	No playoff	Did not enter
1969	2	ASL	4th, South	Did not qualify	Did not enter
1970	2	ASL	5th	No playoff	Did not enter

== Honours ==
- American Soccer League Runner-Up: 2

1965-66, 1966–67

- New Jersey Soccer League Champion: 3

1955-56, 1956–57, 1962–63
