= 1971 Atlanta Chiefs season =

Atlanta Chiefs
1971 season
- Owner: Atlanta Braves, Inc
- Manager: (Wales) Vic Rouse
- Stadium: Tara Stadium
- NASL: Southern Division: First place Regular Season: Second place NASL Championship: Runners-up
- Top goalscorer: (England) Barrie Lynch (8) (Canada) Nick Papadakis (8)
Home colours

The 1971 season was the Atlanta Chiefs' 4th season in the North American Soccer League. This season saw the team end win the Southern Division and played in the NASL Final 1971 as runners-up through a season that lasted from April 17 to September 19, 1971.

== Overview ==
Due to poor attendance in the previous season at Tara Stadium, the Chiefs moved back to the Atlanta–Fulton County Stadium for this season. This resulted in the club achieving a similar success to the 1969 season in reaching the NASL Final 1971. However, they would again lose to their opponents, this time being the Dallas Tornado.

== Squad ==
| No. | Pos. | Nation | Player |
|---|---|---|---|
| 1 | GK | GER | Manfred Kammerer |
| 2 | GK | WAL | Vic Rouse |
| 3 | DF | ENG | John Cocking |
| 4 | DF | ENG | Barrie Lynch |
| 5 | DF | ENG | Ken Bracewell |
| 6 | DF | JAM | Henry Largie |
| 7 | FW | JAM | Art Welch |
| 8 | FW | ENG | Mick Ash |
| 9 | FW | CAN | Nick Papadakis |

| No. | Pos. | Nation | Player |
|---|---|---|---|
| 10 | FW | SCO | Danny Paton |
| 11 | DF | BRA | Uriel da Veiga |
| 12 | FW | ENG | Dave Metchick |
| 15 | FW | ZAM | Freddie Mwila |
| 16 | MF | USA | Mick Hoban |
| 19 | DF | USA | Manley Carter |
| 20 | FW | USA | Alan Hamlyn |
| 24 | MF | RSA | Kaizer Motaung |

== Competitions ==
W = Wins, L = Losses, T= Ties, GF = Goals For, GA = Goals Against, PT= point system

6 points for a win, 3 points for a tie, 0 points for a loss, 1 point for each goal scored up to three per game.

-Premiers (most points). -Other playoff teams.

| Northern Division | W | L | T | GF | GA | PT |
|---|---|---|---|---|---|---|
| Rochester Lancers | 13 | 5 | 6 | 48 | 31 | 141 |
| New York Cosmos | 9 | 10 | 5 | 51 | 55 | 117 |
| Toronto Metros | 5 | 10 | 9 | 32 | 47 | 89 |
| Montreal Olympique | 4 | 15 | 5 | 29 | 59 | 65 |

| Southern Division | W | L | T | GF | GA | PT |
|---|---|---|---|---|---|---|
| Atlanta Chiefs | 12 | 7 | 5 | 35 | 29 | 120 |
| Dallas Tornado | 10 | 6 | 8 | 38 | 24 | 119 |
| Washington Darts | 8 | 6 | 10 | 36 | 34 | 111 |
| St. Louis Stars | 6 | 13 | 5 | 37 | 47 | 86 |

=== North American Soccer League ===
==== Match reports ====
| April 17, 1971 1 | Atlanta Chiefs | 2–0 | Montreal Olympique | Atlanta–Fulton County Stadium, Atlanta |
| | Motaung (?); Mwila (?) | Report | | Attendance: 7,672 |

| April 25, 1971 2 | Washington Darts | 0–0 | Atlanta Chiefs | Catholic University, Washington, D.C. |
| | | Report | | Attendance: 3,452 |

| May 1, 1971 3 | Dallas Tornado | 2–1 | Atlanta Chiefs | Franklin Stadium, Dallas |
| | Renshaw (?); McLoughlin (?) | Report | Mwila (?) | Attendance: 2,895 |

| May 7, 1971 4 | Atlanta Chiefs | 2–0 | Toronto Metros | Atlanta–Fulton County Stadium, Atlanta |
| | Bracewell (?); Mwila (?) | Report | | Attendance: 4,119 |

| May 15, 1971 5 | Rochester Lancers | 1–3 | Atlanta Chiefs | Holleder Memorial, Rochester |
| | Metidieri (?) | Report | Motaung (?); Mwila (?); Metchick (?) | Attendance: 4,113 |

| May 22, 1971 6 | Atlanta Chiefs | 4–1 | St. Louis Stars | Atlanta–Fulton County Stadium, Atlanta |
| | Papadakis (?); Metchick (?); Welch (?) | Report | Gonzales (?) | Attendance: 3,422 |

| May 29, 1971 7 | Atlanta Chiefs | 4–1 | Dallas Tornado | Atlanta–Fulton County Stadium, Atlanta |
| | Papadakis (?); Metchick (?); Motaung (?) | Report | ??? (?) | Attendance: 6,129 |

| June 4, 1971 8 | St. Louis Stars | 2–3 | Atlanta Chiefs | Busch Memorial Stadium, St. Louis |
| | Frankiewicz (?); Hausmann (?) | Report | Lynch (?); Mwila (?); Papadakis (?) | Attendance: 3,112 |

| June 6, 1971 9 | Atlanta Chiefs | 1–3 | Toronto Metros | Varsity Stadium, Toronto |
| | Lynch (?) | Report | Talbot (?); Rioch (?) | Attendance: 7,114 |

| June 12, 1971 10 | Atlanta Chiefs | 1–0 | Rochester Lancers | Atlanta–Fulton County Stadium, Atlanta |
| | Lynch (?) | Report | | Attendance: 4,011 |

| June 19, 1971 11 | Atlanta Chiefs | 1–1 | Washington Darts | Atlanta–Fulton County Stadium, Atlanta |
| | Lynch (?) | Report | Grell (?) | Attendance: 3,687 |

| June 26, 1971 12 | Dallas Tornado | 4–1 | Atlanta Chiefs | Franklin Stadium, Dallas |
| | Gavrić (?); Apostolidis (?); Youlden (?) | Report | Papadakis (?) | Attendance: 4,057 |

| July 3, 1971 13 | Atlanta Chiefs | 1–3 | New York Cosmos | Atlanta–Fulton County Stadium, Atlanta |
| | Lynch (?) | Report | Horton (?); Siega (?) | Attendance: 3,687 |

| July 10, 1971 14 | Atlanta Chiefs | 2–0 | St. Louis Stars | Atlanta–Fulton County Stadium, Atlanta |
| | Largie (?); Motaung (?) | Report | | Attendance: 4,248 |

| July 18, 1971 15 | Montreal Olympique | 0–1 | Atlanta Chiefs | Autostade, Montreal |
| | | Report | Papadakis (?) | Attendance: 1,635 |

| July 23, 1971 16 | Atlanta Chiefs | 0–3 | Dallas Tornado | Atlanta–Fulton County Stadium, Atlanta |
| | McLoughlin (?); Youlden (?) | Report | | Attendance: 4,248 |

| August 2, 1971 17 | Washington Darts | 0–0 | Atlanta Chiefs | Catholic University, Washington, D.C. |
| | | Report | | Attendance: 2,283 |

| August 18, 1971 18 | St. Louis Stars | 0–1 | Atlanta Chiefs | Busch Memorial Stadium, St. Louis |
| | | Report | Papadakis (?) | Attendance: 6,687 |

| August 22, 1971 19 | Atlanta Chiefs | 1–1 | Dallas Tornado | Atlanta–Fulton County Stadium, Atlanta |
| | Largie (?) | Report | Kerr (?) | Attendance: 3,420 |

| August 29, 1971 20 | New York Cosmos | 2–1 | Atlanta Chiefs | Yankee Stadium, New York City |
| | Mitrović (?); Alan O'Neill | Report | Largie (?) | Attendance: 2,714 |

| September 2, 1971 21 | Atlanta Chiefs | 1–0 | New York Cosmos | Atlanta–Fulton County Stadium, Atlanta |
| | Motaung (?) | Report | | Attendance: 3,420 |

| September 5, 1971 22 | New York Cosmos | 0–2 | Atlanta Chiefs | Yankee Stadium, New York City |
| | | Report | Largie (?); Motaung (?) | Attendance: 2,714 |

=== NASL Final ===
| September 12, 1971 First leg | Atlanta Chiefs | 2–1 (a.e.t.) | Dallas Tornado | Atlanta–Fulton County Stadium, Atlanta |
| | da Veiga 72'; Motaung 124' | Report | Molnár 41' | Attendance: 3,218 |

| September 15, 1971 Second leg | Dallas Tornado | 4–1 | Atlanta Chiefs | Franklin Stadium, Dallas |
| | Tinney 45'; Juracy 54', 76'; Tony McLoughlin | Report 1 Report 2 | Largie 44' | Attendance: 6,456 |

| September 19, 1971 Playoffs | Atlanta Chiefs | 0–2 | Dallas Tornado | Atlanta Stadium, Atlanta |
| | | Report 1 Report 2 | Renshaw 3'; Moffat 45' | Attendance: 4,687 |

== Friendlies ==
| April 2, 1971 | (United States) Atlanta Chiefs | 4–1 | (United States) Washington Darts | Arlington, Virginia |
| | Mwila (?); Welch (?); Motaung (?); Papadakis (?) | Report | Grell 1' | Attendance: 600 |

| May 7, 1971 | (United States) Atlanta Chiefs | 1–0 | (Scotland) Heart of Midlothian | Atlanta–Fulton County Stadium, Atlanta |
| | Papadakis (?) | Report | | Attendance: 3,075 |

| June 15, 1971 | (United States) Atlanta Chiefs | 3–2 | (Italy) Vicenza | Atlanta–Fulton County Stadium, Atlanta |
| | Lynch (?); Motaung (?) | Report | Ciccolo (?); Scala (?) | Attendance: 4,041 |

| July 8, 1971 | (United States) Atlanta Chiefs | 1–1 | (Greece) Apollon Smyrnis | Atlanta–Fulton County Stadium, Atlanta |
| | Lynch (?) | Report | Skoufos (?) | Attendance: 4,586 |

| August 10, 1971 | (United States) Atlanta Chiefs | 0–2 | (Brazil) Bangu | Atlanta–Fulton County Stadium, Atlanta |
| | | Report | Elmuro (?); Alves (?) | Attendance: 3,480 |
