= 1970 Atlanta Chiefs season =

Atlanta Chiefs
1970 season
- Owner: Atlanta Braves, Inc
- Manager: (Wales) Vic Rouse
- Stadium: Tara Stadium
- NASL: Southern Division: Second place Regular Season: First place NASL Championship: Finalist
- Top goalscorer: Art Welch (13)
Home colours

The 1970 season was the Atlanta Chiefs' 3rd season in the North American Soccer League. This season saw the team end in second place within the Southern Division as their season lasted from March 26 to August 29.

== Overview ==
Due to financial costs of playing at the Atlanta–Fulton County Stadium, the Chiefs chose to play in nearby Tara Stadium. They also received a new club manager through Welsh manager Vic Rouse as he had agreed to become a player-manager for the club beginning in this season. The relocation in Tara would ultimately prove to be an unpopular decision as they returned to Atlanta–Fulton by the following 1971 season.

== Squad ==
No.	Pos.	Nation	Player
1	GK	GER	Manfred Kammerer
2	GK	WAL	Vic Rouse
3	DF	ENG	John Cocking
5	DF	ENG	Ken Bracewell
6	DF	JAM	Henry Largie
7	FW	JAM	Art Welch
8	FW	ENG	Mick Ash
9	FW	CAN	Nick Papadakis

No.	Pos.	Nation	Player
10	DF	JAM	Delroy Scott
11	DF	BRA	Uriel da Veiga
12	FW	ENG	Ray Bloomfield
16	MF	ENG	Dave Metchick
18	FW	ENG	Graham Newton
19	DF	USA	Manley Carter
20	FW	TTO	Everald Cummings
24	MF	RSA	Kaizer Motaung

== Competitions ==
=== NASL regular season ===
G = Games, W = Wins, L = Losses, T= Ties, GF = Goals For, GA = Goals Against, PT= point system

6 points for a win, 3 points for a tie, 0 points for a loss, 1 point for each goal scored up to three per game.

Northern Division	G	W	L	T	GF	GA	PT
Rochester Lancers	24	9	9	6	41	45	111
Kansas City Spurs	24	8	10	6	42	44	100
St. Louis Stars	24	5	17	2	26	71	60

Southern Division	G	W	L	T	GF	GA	PT
Washington Darts	24	14	6	4	52	29	137
Atlanta Chiefs	24	11	8	5	53	33	123
Dallas Tornado	24	8	12	4	39	39	92

==== Match reports ====
April 11, 1970 1	Atlanta Chiefs	2–4	St. Louis Stars	Tara Stadium, Atlanta
	Ash (?); Newton (?)	Report		Attendance: 5,317

May 2, 1970 2	Dallas Tornado	0–1	Atlanta Chiefs	Franklin Stadium, Dallas
		Report	Newton (?)	Attendance: 1,254

May 16, 1970 3	Atlanta Chiefs	2–2	Rochester Lancers	Tara Stadium, Atlanta
	Papadakis (?); Cummings (?)	Report	Marotte (?)	Attendance: 4,212

May 24, 1970 4	Washington Darts	0–1	St. Louis Stars	Francis Olympic Field, St. Louis
		Report	Pat McBride (?)	Attendance: 3,068

June 7, 1970 5	Rochester Lancers	1–3	Atlanta Chiefs	Holleder Memorial, Rochester
	Papadakis (?); Metchick (?); Welch (?)	Report	Mitchell (?)	Attendance: 2,591

June 13, 1970 6	Atlanta Chiefs	0–2	Kansas City Spurs	Tara Stadium, Atlanta
		Report	Seissler (?)	Attendance: 2,333

June 20, 1970 7	Washington Darts	0–0	Atlanta Chiefs	Catholic University, Washington, D.C.
		Report		Attendance: 2,006

June 27, 1970 8	Atlanta Chiefs	0–1	Dallas Tornado	Tara Stadium, Atlanta
		Report	? (?)

June 3, 1970 9	Rochester Lancers	1–1	Atlanta Chiefs	Holleder Memorial, Rochester
	Newton (?)	Report	Lefkos (?)	Attendance: 3,112

July 12, 1970 10	Washington Darts	2–2	St. Louis Stars	Francis Olympic Field, St. Louis
	Gonzales (?); Leeker (?)	Report	Papadakis (?); Ash (?)	Attendance: 2,500

July 18, 1970 11	Atlanta Chiefs	1–2	Washington Darts	Tara Stadium, Atlanta
	Cummings (?)	Report	Nana (?); Browne (?)

July 25, 1970 12	Atlanta Chiefs	6–1	St. Louis Stars	Tara Stadium, Atlanta
	Metchick (?); Largie (?); Papadakis (?); Bloomfield (?)	Report	McBride (?)	Attendance: 1,078

August 2, 1970 13	Atlanta Chiefs	6–2	Kansas City Spurs	Tara Stadium, Atlanta
	Largie (?); Welch (?); Papadakis (?)	Report	Durante (?)	Attendance: 2,132

August 8, 1970 14	Atlanta Chiefs	3–0	Rochester Lancers	Tara Stadium, Atlanta
	Ash (?); Newton (?)	Report		Attendance: 1,318

August 15, 1970 15	Dallas Tornado	2–5	Atlanta Chiefs	Franklin Stadium, Dallas
	Apostolidis (?)	Report	Welch (?); Metchick (?); Largie (?)	Attendance: 3,494

August 23, 1970 16	Atlanta Chiefs	3–0	Dallas Tornado	Tara Stadium, Atlanta
	Papadakis (?); Ash (?); Welch (?)	Report

August 29, 1970 17	Atlanta Chiefs	5–2	Washington Darts	Tara Stadium, Atlanta
	Papadakis (?); Largie (?); Welch (?)	Report

== Friendlies ==
March 26, 1970	(United States) Atlanta Chiefs	5–1	(United States) Atlanta Amateur All-Stars	Tara Stadium, Atlanta
	Newton (?); Ash (?); da Veiga (?); Papadakis	Report	Afful (?)	Attendance: 4,000

May 11, 1970	(United States) Atlanta Chiefs	1–2	(England) Coventry City	Tara Stadium, Atlanta
	Ash (?)	Report	Joicey (?)	Attendance: 6,773

May 31, 1970	(United States) Atlanta Chiefs	2–2	(Germany) Hertha BSC	Atlanta–Fulton County, Atlanta
	Metchick (?)	Report	Horr (?); Brungs (?)	Attendance: 1,782

June 25, 1970	(United States) Atlanta Chiefs	1–0	(Israel) Hapoel Petah Tikva	Tara Stadium, Atlanta
	da Veiga 77'	Report

July 16, 1970	(United States) Atlanta Chiefs	1–2	(Portugal) Varzim	Atlanta–Fulton County, Atlanta
	Metchick (?)	Report	Valdir Sousa (?); Nuntes Pinto (?)	Attendance: 2,255
