= 1971 North American Soccer League season =

Soccer league season

North American Soccer League 1971 season
- Season: 1971
- Teams: 8
- Champions: Dallas Tornado
- Premiers: Rochester Lancers
- Matches: 112
- Goals: 306 (2.73 per match)
- Top goalscorer: (United States) Carlos Metidieri (19 goals)
- Highest attendance: 19,437 Rochester @ NY
- Average attendance: 4,154

Statistics of North American Soccer League in season 1971. This was the 4th season of the NASL.

== Overview ==
Eight teams competed in the 1971 season. The Dallas Tornado won the league championship after playing several playoff matches under the new sudden death rule, which replaced the penalty shootout. In Game 1 of the best-of-three semifinal against the Rochester Lancers, league scoring champion Carlos Metidieri of Rochester scored to end the match at 2–1 in the 176th minute after six periods of overtime—shortly before midnight. Three days later, Dallas tied the series with a 3–1 regulation win. In the deciding match, the two teams ended regulation with a 1–1 tie and played four overtime periods before Bobby Moffat scored in the 148 minute for a 2–1 victory. Four days later, Dallas lost Game 1 of the NASL Championship Series, 2–1, in the 3rd overtime to the Atlanta Chiefs after 123 minutes. All totaled, Dallas had played 537 minutes of soccer (3 minutes short of six games) in 13 days. The Tornado won 4–1 in Game 2 and 2–0 in Game 3 to clinch the league championship.

== Changes From the previous season ==
=== Rule changes ===
Playoffs series switched from a two-game aggregate score to a best-two-out-of-three match format. Any playoff games tied after 90 minutes would now be settled by golden goal (or sudden death) overtime periods lasting 15 minutes each.

=== New teams ===
- Montreal Olympique
- New York Cosmos
- Toronto Metros

=== Teams folding ===
- Kansas City Spurs

=== Teams moving ===
- None

=== Name changes ===
- None

== Map of clubs ==
Northern Division Southern Division

== Regular season ==
W = Wins, L = Losses, T= Ties, GF = Goals For, GA = Goals Against, PT= point system

6 points for a win, 3 points for a tie, 0 points for a loss, 1 point for each goal scored up to three per game.

-Premiers (most points). -Other playoff teams.

Northern Division	W	L	T	GF	GA	PT
Rochester Lancers	13	5	6	48	31	141
New York Cosmos	9	10	5	51	55	117
Toronto Metros	5	10	9	32	47	89
Montreal Olympique	4	15	5	29	59	65

Southern Division	W	L	T	GF	GA	PT
Atlanta Chiefs	12	7	5	35	29	120
Dallas Tornado	10	6	8	38	24	119
Washington Darts	8	6	10	36	34	111
St. Louis Stars	6	13	5	37	47	86

== 1971 NASL All-Stars ==
First Team	Position	Second Team	Honorable Mention
(Socialist Federal Republic of Yugoslavia) Mirko Stojanovic, Dallas	G	(Uruguay) Leonel Conde, Washington	(Germany) Manfred Kammerer, Atlanta • (Brazil) Claude Campos, Rochester
(United States) Dick Hall, Dallas	D	(England) Clive Charles, Montreal	(Scotland) Frank Donlavey, Washington
(Ghana) Willie Evans, Washington	D	(Brazil) Uriel da Veiga, Atlanta	(Brazil) Oreco, Dallas
(England) Peter Short, Rochester	D	(England) John Cocking, Atlanta	(Socialist Federal Republic of Yugoslavia) Gabbo Gavrić, Dallas
(United States) John Best, Dallas	D	(Scotland) Charlie Mitchell, Rochester	(United States) Mick Hoban, Atlanta • (Uruguay) Roberto Lonardo, Rochester
(Socialist Federal Republic of Yugoslavia) Dragan Popovic, St. Louis	M	(Argentina) Francisco Escos, Rochester	(Zambia) Freddie Mwila, Atlanta • (England) Barrie Lynch, Atlanta
(United States) Siggy Stritzl, New York	M	(Portugal) Felix Correia, Toronto	(Scotland) Billy Fraser, Washington • (England) Keith Pointer, Montreal • (United States) Roy Turner, Dallas
(United States) Carlos Metidieri, Rochester	F	(Trinidad and Tobago) Warren Archibald, Washington	(England) Tommy Youlden, Dallas
(Bermuda) Randy Horton, New York	F	(Poland) Casey Frankiewicz, St. Louis	(Brazil) Iris DeBrito, Rochester
(South Africa) Kaizer Motaung, Atlanta	F	(Italy) Franco Gallina, Montreal	(United States) Mike Renshaw, Dallas
(United States) Manfred Seissler, Rochester	F	(United States) Jorge Siega, New York	(Trinidad and Tobago) Leroy DeLeon, Washington • (Scotland) Ian MacHattie, Toronto

== Playoffs ==
=== Bracket ===
Semifinals; Best-of-3
N1	Rochester Lancers	2	1	1
S2	Dallas Tornado	1	3	2
S1	Atlanta Chiefs	1	2	–
N2	New York Cosmos	0	0	–

NASL Final 1971; Best-of-3
S2	Dallas Tornado	1	4	2
S1	Atlanta Chiefs	2	1	1

=== Semifinals ===
Higher seed	Series	Lower seed	Game 1	Game 2	Game 3	Attendance
Rochester Lancers	1 - 2	Dallas Tornado	2–1 (6ot)	1–3	1–2 (4ot)	September 1 • Aquinas Memorial Stadium • 8,309; September 4 • Franklin Stadium • 6,131; September 8 • Aquinas Memorial Stadium • 7,635
Atlanta Chiefs	2 - 0	New York Cosmos	1–0(3ot)	2–0	x	September 2 • Atlanta Stadium • 3,160; September 5 • Hofstra Stadium • 3,800

=== NASL Final 1971 ===
Higher seed	Series	Lower seed	Game 1	Game 2	Game 3	Attendance
Atlanta Chiefs	1 - 2	Dallas Tornado	2–1 (3ot)	1–4	0–2	September 12 • Atlanta Stadium • 3,218; September 15 • Franklin Stadium • 6,456; September 19 • Atlanta Stadium • 4,687

==== Game one ====
September 12	Atlanta Chiefs	2–1 (a.e.t.)	Dallas Tornado	Atlanta Stadium, Atlanta, Georgia
	Uriel da Veiga (71:53); Kaizer Motaung 123:58'	Report	Tibor Molnár (40:39)	Attendance: 3,218

==== Game two ====
September 15	Dallas Tornado	4–1	Atlanta Chiefs	Franklin Stadium, Dallas, Texas
	Phil Tinney 45'; Luiz Juracy 54'; Luiz Juracy 76'; Tony McLoughlin	Report 1 Report 2	Henry Largie 44' (Paton)	Attendance: 6,456

==== Game three ====
September 19	Atlanta Chiefs	0–2	Dallas Tornado	Atlanta Stadium, Atlanta, Georgia
		Report	Mike Renshaw (2:34); Bobby Moffat (44:30)	Attendance: 4,687

1971 NASL Champions: Dallas Tornado

== Post season awards ==
- Most Valuable Player: (United States) Carlos Metidieri, Rochester
- Coach of the year: (England) Ron Newman, Dallas
- Rookie of the year: (Bermuda) Randy Horton, New York
