= NASL Final 1971 =

Soccer match

- Event: NASL Final
Atlanta Chiefs	Dallas Tornado
1	2
- (Best-of-three series)

Game 1
Atlanta Chiefs	Dallas Tornado
2	1
- after extra time
- Date: September 12, 1971
- Venue: Atlanta Stadium, Atlanta, Georgia
- Attendance: 3,218

Game 2
Dallas Tornado	Atlanta Chiefs
4	1
- Date: September 15, 1971
- Venue: Franklin Stadium, Dallas
- Attendance: 6,456

Game 3
Atlanta Chiefs	Dallas Tornado
0	2
- Date: September 19, 1971
- Venue: Atlanta Stadium, Atlanta, Georgia
- Attendance: 4,687

NASL Final 1971 was the championship series of the 1971 season. It was contested as a best-of-three series between the Dallas Tornado and the Atlanta Chiefs. The matches were held on September 9, 15, and 19, 1971. Games one and three were played at Atlanta Stadium, in Atlanta, Georgia. Game two was played at Franklin Stadium of Hillcrest High School in Dallas. A combined 14,361 people attended the three game series. The Chiefs won game one, while the Tornado won games two and three to claim their first NASL championship.

== Background ==
The Dallas Tornado qualified for the playoffs by virtue of having the highest non-division-winning point total in the league (119 points). They defeated the defending league champion Rochester Lancers 2–1 in a marathon best-of-three semifinal series. The series featured two of the longest matches in the sport's history due to the NASL's adoption of a sudden death rule to replace the penalty shootout. The first leg ended shortly before midnight on September 1 with a victory for Rochester after 176 minutes and required six overtime periods; the third leg lasted 148 minutes with four overtime periods and sent the Tornado to the final with a 2–1 win.

The Atlanta Chiefs qualified for the playoffs by winning the Southern Division with 120 points. The Chiefs then defeated the New York Cosmos in the semifinals with two wins and no goals conceded.

== Series summary ==
Champion	Runner-up	Game 1	Venue 1	Game 2	Venue 2	Game 3	Venue 3	Result
Dallas Tornado	Atlanta Chiefs	1–2	Atlanta Stadium	4–1	Franklin Stadium	2–0	Atlanta Stadium	2–1 (Note: Result on games won, as a best-of-three series.)

== Match details ==
=== First leg ===
September 12

Atlanta Chiefs	2–1 (a.e.t.)	Dallas Tornado
da Veiga 72'; Motaung 124'	Report	Molnár 41'

Atlanta Stadium, Atlanta
Attendance: 3,218

Atlanta Chiefs	Dallas Tornado

=== Second leg ===
September 15

Dallas Tornado	4–1	Atlanta Chiefs
Tinney 45'; Juracy 54', 76'; Tony McLoughlin	Report 1 Report 2	Largie 44'

Franklin Stadium, Dallas
Attendance: 6,456

Dallas Tornado	Atlanta Chiefs

=== Playoff ===
September 19

Atlanta Chiefs	0–2	Dallas Tornado
	Report 1 Report 2	Renshaw 3'; Moffat 45'

Atlanta Stadium, Atlanta
Attendance: 4,687

Atlanta Chiefs	Dallas Tornado

GK	1	(Germany) Manfred Kammerer
DF		(United States) Alan Hamlyn
DF	5	(England) Ken Bracewell (c)
DF	6	(Jamaica) Henry Largie
DF	3	(England) John Cocking
DF	11	(Brazil) Uriel da Veiga
MF	12	(Canada) Alec Papadakis
MF	10	(Scotland) Danny Paton
FW	15	(Zambia) Freddie Mwila
FW	9	(Canada) Nick Papadakis
FW	24	(South Africa) Kaizer Motaung
Manager:
(Wales) Vic Rouse

GK	16	(Socialist Federal Republic of Yugoslavia) Mirko Stojanović
DF	5	(England) Dick Hall
DF	3	(Brazil) Oreco
DF	4	(England) John Best (c)
DF	12	(Socialist Federal Republic of Yugoslavia) Momčilo Gavrić
MF	14	(England) Bobby Moffat
MF	6	(England) Roy Turner
FW	18	(Scotland) Phillip Tinney
FW	9	(Brazil) Luiz Juracy
FW	10	(England) Tony McLoughlin
FW	11	(England) Mike Renshaw
Manager:
(England) Ron Newman

1971 NASL Champions: Dallas Tornado

== See also ==
- 1971 North American Soccer League season
