= Manfred Kammerer =

German footballer (1944–2019)

Personal information
- Full name: Manfred Kammerer
- Date of birth: 28 September 1944 (age 82)
- Place of birth: Niedersonthofen, Swabia, Germany
- Height: 5 ft 11 in (1.80 m)
- Position: Goalkeeper

Senior career*
Years	Team	Apps	(Gls)
- FV Graben
–1966	TSG Augsburg		
1967	Atlanta Chiefs		
1968	Detroit Cougars	14	(0)
1969–1973	Atlanta Chiefs	61	(0)
- * Club domestic league appearances and goals

Manfred Kammerer (born 28 September 1944) is a retired German footballer. He is known for being the goalkeeper for the Atlanta Chiefs throughout the late 1960s and early 1970s in the North American Soccer League.

== Club career ==
Kammerer began his career within Swabia, playing for clubs such as FC Graben and TSG Augsburg within the Amateurliga Bayern. However, his career would truly begin when he caught the interest of Atlanta Chiefs club manager Phil Woosnam to play within the non-FIFA recognized National Professional Soccer League. Arriving in 1967, the club had a mediocre start, finishing in 4th place just behind the Pittsburgh Phantoms. Despite the Chiefs surviving the NPSL's dissolution and incorporation into the North American Soccer League, Kammerer instead chose to play for the Detroit Cougars for the 1968 season. This was also a mediocre season for Kammerer however as the Cougars finished at the bottom of their group and due to net losses in revenue, the club would fold by the end of the season. However, the Chiefs allowed Kammerer to return to the club for their 1969 season to where Kammerer began the leading goalkeeper that season as well as the Chiefs narrowly losing the title by just a single point. This period of relative success would continue into their 1970 season as Kammerer contributed to the club nearly winning the Southern Division that season. The 1971 season would the second time the Chiefs nearly won the national title as the Chiefs nearly won the NASL Final 1971 with Kammerer playing in all three matchdays. He remained in the Chiefs until the first iteration of the franchise folded following their 1973 season.
