= Ray Bloomfield =

English footballer

Personal information
- Date of birth: 15 October 1944 (age 82)
- Place of birth: London, England
- Position: Winger

Youth career
- Kensington Boys
- 1960–1964: Arsenal

Senior career*
Years	Team	Apps	(Gls)
1964–1966	Aston Villa	3	(0)
1967–1970	Atlanta Chiefs	67	(7)
1971–1973	Dallas Tornado	29	(1)
- * Club domestic league appearances and goals

Raymond George Bloomfield (born 15 October 1944 in Kensington, London) is an English former professional footballer who played in the Football League as a winger for Aston Villa, in the National Professional Soccer League for the Atlanta Chiefs, and in the North American Soccer League for Atlanta and the Dallas Tornado. He is the nephew of footballer and manager Jimmy Bloomfield.

== Career ==
As a young player he represented England at schoolboy level, where he played alongside David Pleat, Barry Fry and Ron Harris, and at youth level.

Bloomfield signed for Arsenal as an apprentice in 1960 and appeared in the youth and reserve set up, but was never selected for a senior competitive match. In August 1964, Bloomfield signed with Aston Villa, before following fellow team-mate Phil Woosnam to the United States in 1967. He joined Phil at the newly formed Atlanta Chiefs in the first professional league, the National Professional Soccer League which then became the North American Soccer League. He won two NASL championships, the first-ever professional sports title for the city of Atlanta in 1968 and the second in 1971 with Dallas Tornado, where he ended his professional playing career.

He later became a players' agent involved in bringing a number of Croatian internationals to the Premier League.
