= Nicky Jennings =

English footballer

Personal information
- Full name: Nicholas Jennings
- Date of birth: 18 January 1946
- Place of birth: Wellington, Somerset, England
- Date of death: 4 June 2016 (aged 70)
- Position: Winger

Youth career
- 1961–63: Wellington

Senior career*
Years	Team	Apps	(Gls)
1963–1967	Plymouth Argyle	98	(11)
1967–1974	Portsmouth	206	(45)
1973	→ Aldershot (loan)	4	(1)
1973	Dallas Tornado	18	(3)
1974–1978	Exeter City	124	(15)
- * Club domestic league appearances and goals

Nicholas Jennings (18 January 1946 – 4 June 2016) was an English professional footballer whose 15-year career ran from the early 1960s to the mid-1970s.

Born in Wellington, Somerset he played nearly 100 league games for his first club Plymouth Argyle. A speedy winger, he moved to Portsmouth in January 1967 and was to prove such a popular player that in 1971 he was awarded the title of Portsmouth Player of the Year. In all he made over 200 appearances for Portsmouth (and 4 during a loan spell at Aldershot) before moving to Exeter City on a free transfer in the 1974 close season, making his final league appearance in 1978. Jennings also played the summer of 1973 in the NASL with the Dallas Tornado. He was named an All-Star Honorable Mention and help Dallas to the league final, which they lost 0–2.

Jennings died on Saturday 4 June 2016 at the age of 70.
