= Dave Coskunian =

Turkish-American soccer player (1947–2025)

Personal information
- Full name: Davit Coşkun
- Date of birth: June 1, 1947
- Place of birth: Samsun, Turkey
- Date of death: October 24, 2025 (aged 78)
- Place of death: Whittier, California, U.S.
- Height: 5 ft 8 in (1.73 m)
- Positions: Striker; midfielder

Youth career
- 1965–1967: İstanbulspor A.Ş.

Senior career*
Years	Team	Apps	(Gls)
1967	Los Angeles Toros	19	(6)
1974	San Jose Earthquakes	4	(0)

International career
1973–1974	United States	3	(0)
- * Club domestic league appearances and goals

Davit "Dave Coskunian" Coşkun (June 1, 1947 – October 24, 2025) was a Turkish-American soccer player of Armenian descent. He earned three caps with the U.S. national team. He played one season in the National Professional Soccer League and one in the North American Soccer League.

== Club career ==
In 1965, Çoşkun began his professional career with İstanbulspor A.Ş. in Turkey. On February 7, 1967, he signed with the Los Angeles Toros of the National Professional Soccer League. The Toros folded at the end of the season, but Çoşkun remained in the Los Angeles area, playing for various amateur clubs. On April 2, 1974, he joined the Los Angeles Aztecs of the North American Soccer League, but was released on May 1, 1974. He then moved north to play that season with the San Jose Earthquakes. In the fall of 1974, Çoşkun moved back to Los Angeles where he joined the Los Angeles Armenians of the Greater Los Angeles Soccer League.

== International career ==
Çoşkun played three games with the U.S. national team. The first was a 4–0 loss to Bermuda on March 17, 1973. He started, but came off for Mike Renshaw. In his second game, a 4–0 loss to Poland on March 20, 1973, he replaced Rudy Getzinger at halftime. Finally, in his last game, a 3–1 loss to Mexico on September 5, 1974, he replaced Bob Matteson in the 84th minute.

== Name ==
Coşkun began his career in the United States using his birth name. However, by the time he joined the Aztecs and Earthquakes in 1974, he was known as "Dave" Çoşkun. He also used the name Dave Coskunian when playing for the national team.
