= Mick Ash =

English footballer (1943–2012)

Personal information
- Full name: Michael Ash
- Date of birth: 4 September 1943
- Place of birth: Sheffield, England
- Date of death: November 2012 (aged 69)
- Place of death: Sheffield, England
- Position: Striker

Senior career*
Years	Team	Apps	(Gls)
1963–1964	Sheffield United	3	(1)
1965–1967	Scunthorpe United	49	(7)
1967–1968	New York Generals	27	(10)
1969–1971	Atlanta Chiefs	33	(5)
- * Club domestic league appearances and goals

Michael Ash (4 September 1943 – November 2012) was an English footballer.

Ash began his career as an apprentice with Sheffield United where he graduated to the first team in 1963. In 1965, he transferred to Scunthorpe United. When Freddie Goodwin left Scunthorpe to manage the New York Generals of the National Professional Soccer League in 1967, Ash went with him. In 1969, he transferred to the Atlanta Chiefs. In his last season with the Chiefs, Ash scored in Atlanta's loss to the Dallas Tornado in the 1971 NASL championship game.

Ash died in Sheffield in November 2012, at the age of 69.
