= Albert Jackson (footballer) =

English footballer

Personal information
- Date of birth: 12 September 1943
- Place of birth: Manchester, England
- Date of death: 2 December 2014 (aged 71)
- Place of death: Oldham, England
- Positions: Defender; forward

Youth career
- 1962–1963: Manchester United

Senior career*
Years	Team	Apps	(Gls)
1963–1966	Oldham Athletic	22	(4)
1963	→ Mossley (loan)	2	(0)
1966–1972	Bangor City		
1972–1975	Wigan Athletic	108	(27)
1974–1975	→ Dallas Tornado (loan)	33	(7)
1975	Bangor City		
1975–1977	Mossley	90	(2)
1976–1978	Droylsden		
Total		255	(40)
- * Club domestic league appearances and goals

Albert Jackson (12 September 1943 – 2 December 2014) was an English footballer who played as a forward.
