= Kenny Cooper Sr. =

English footballer (born 1946)

Kenny Cooper
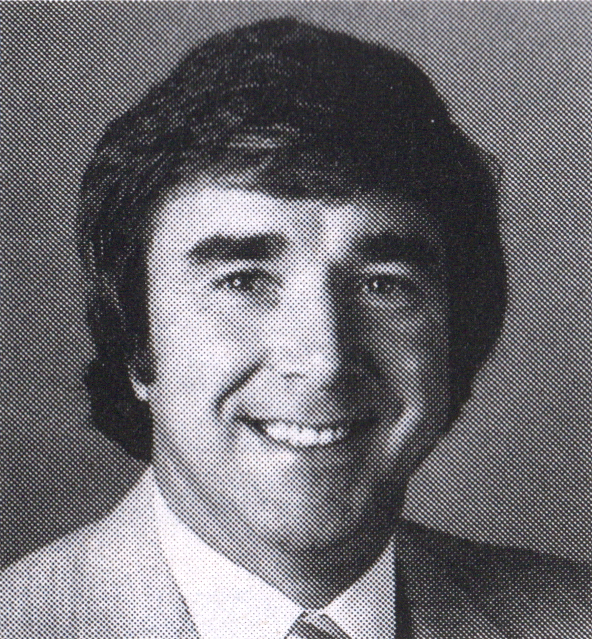
- Cooper circa 1984

Personal information
- Full name: Kenneth Cooper
- Date of birth: 11 October 1946 (age 80)
- Place of birth: Blackpool, England
- Position: Goalkeeper

Senior career*
Years	Team	Apps	(Gls)
	Blackburn Rovers	0	(0)
1967–1970	Fleetwood	154	(0)
1970–1979	Dallas Tornado	170	(0)

Managerial career
- 1979–1980: Houston Summit (indoor)
- 1980–1992: Baltimore Blast (indoor)
- 1992–1994: Baltimore Spirit (indoor)
- 1995–1996: Tampa Bay Terror (indoor)
- * Club domestic league appearances and goals

Kenny Cooper Sr. (born 11 October 1946) is an English former football player and coach. A goalkeeper, he spent ten seasons playing for the Dallas Tornado of the North American Soccer League and eighteen seasons coaching indoor soccer. He was the 1984 and 1988 Major Indoor Soccer League Coach of the Year.

== Playing career ==
Cooper started his playing career in England where he played mainly for Fleetwood in the Lancashire Combination and Northern Premier League between 1967 and 1970. He left Fleetwood in late 1970 and emigrated to the United States where he played for Dallas Tornado between 1970 and 1979.

== Coaching career ==
In 1979, Cooper retired from playing and was immediately hired to replace Timo Liekoski as the head coach of the Houston Summit of Major Indoor Soccer League. Cooper took the Summit to the 1980 MISL championship game, where it lost to the New York Arrows. In 1980, the team's owner, Bernie Rodin, had decided to move the team to the east coast, but was unsure which city. He tasked Cooper with deciding between Baltimore and Boston. When Cooper arrived in Baltimore, he "was excited from the beginning. It just reminded me of Liverpool." He returned to Houston and informed Rodin the team should relocate to Baltimore. In 1984, he coached the Blast to its only championship in the original MISL and was the 1984 and 1988 MISL Coach of the Year. Cooper also served as the Blast's general manager. In 1992, the Blast folded along with the MISL. With the collapse of the Blast, Cooper was instrumental in the forming of the Baltimore Spirit in July 1992. The Spirit entered the indoor National Professional Soccer League. Cooper took the Spirit to the playoffs in both of his seasons as coach. In 1994, stepped down as head coach, but remained as the team president. In 1995, Cooper joined with Bill Collins, a minor-league baseball owner, to enter an expansion team into the NPSL. He went on to serve as general manager and coach for the team, known as the Tampa Bay Terror. He took the team to a 14–26 record in his first season, and took what was described as a "leave of absence" from coaching duties (while maintaining his position as team president) in December 1996. He was replaced first by Perry Van der Beck on an interim basis, then Derrick Marcano, who coached the team to the playoffs. The Terror folded at the conclusion of the 1996–97 season.

== Personal life ==
He is the father of Kenny Cooper, who also played professionally.

He and Mike Renshaw currently co-own a wine import business.
