= John Best (soccer) =

Soccer player (1940–2014)

- Best in 1967

Personal information
- Date of birth: 11 July 1940
- Place of birth: Liverpool, England
- Date of death: 5 October 2014 (aged 74)
- Place of death: Ireland
- Position: Defender

Senior career*
Years	Team	Apps	(Gls)
1958–1960	Liverpool	0	(0)
1960–1961	Tranmere Rovers	7	(0)
1961–1962	Stockport County	0	(0)
1962–1967	Philadelphia Ukrainians		
1967	Philadelphia Spartans	12	(1)
1968	Cleveland Stokers	32	(0)
1968	Fleetwood	18	(2)
1968–1969	California Jaguars		
1969–1973	Dallas Tornado	93	(0)
1971	Dallas Tornado (indoor)	2	(1)
1974	Seattle Sounders	0	(0)

International career
1973	United States	1	(0)

Managerial career
- 1974–1976: Seattle Sounders
- * Club domestic league appearances and goals

John Best (11 July 1940 – 5 October 2014) was a professional soccer player who played as a defender, spending six seasons in the North American Soccer League where he was a five-time first team All Star. He later coached the NASL Seattle Sounders and served as the general manager of the Sounders and the Vancouver Whitecaps. Born in England, he also earned one cap with the United States national team in 1973.

== Playing career ==
Best began his career in England. He played for Liverpool in 1959 under the new manager, Bill Shankly, after which he played seven games with Tranmere Rovers in 1960. In 1967, he moved to the United States where he signed with the Philadelphia Spartans of the National Professional Soccer League (NPSL). In 1968, the NPSL merged with the United Soccer Association to form the North American Soccer League. When the Spartans folded, Best and several of his teammates, transferred to the Cleveland Stokers for the 1969 NASL season. When the Stokers folded at the end of the season, he moved to the Dallas Tornado (NASL). From 1969 to 1973, he played in ninety-three games and was a five-time first team All Star. In 1971, the Tornado won the NASL championship. Best retired at the end of the 1973 season. Best also returned briefly to England in 1968 to play for Fleetwood in the Northern Premier League.

=== United States national team ===
Best earned his one cap with the United States national team in a 17 March 1963 game with Bermuda. Best began the game, a 4–0 loss, and came off for Johnny Moore.

== Coaching and managerial career ==
In 1974, the NASL expansion team Seattle Sounders began assembling its staff and roster. The owners hired Cliff McCrath, the head coach of the local Seattle Pacific University to fill in the team's roster spots. He hired Best as the team's first head coach. Over his three years as coach, Best compiled a 43–26 record.

After leaving the Sounders, Best moved north to become the general manager of the Vancouver Whitecaps. One of his most successful personnel moves was hiring Tony Waiters as head coach. This move and several others led to the Whitecaps winning the 1979 NASL championship. In 1982, the Sounders opened their season 2–7. The team ownership turned to Best who became the Sounders' general manager on 14 June 1982. The Sounders turned their season around and went to the championship game, only to lose to the New York Cosmos. Despite this success, the team was losing money, and after its sale to new ownership in January 1983, Best left the team.

== Later years ==
Best remained in the Seattle area, founding Tacoma Indoor Soccer, Inc, which became the ownership group for the Tacoma Stars of the Major Indoor Soccer League (MISL). He was later inducted into the Tacoma-Pierce County Sports Hall of Fame.

In 1990, Best was diagnosed with kidney disease and in 2002 received a kidney transplant from his wife, Claudia.

== Death ==
On 5 October 2014, Best died from a lung infection at the age of 74 while visiting family in Ireland.

== Honors ==
Dallas Tornado

- NASL Championships: 1971, 1971 indoor; runner-up 1973

Individual

- NASL First Team All Star: 1969, 1970, 1971, 1972, 1973
