= Bob Matteson =

American soccer player and coach

Personal information
- Full name: Robert Matteson
- Date of birth: June 2, 1952 (age 74)
- Place of birth: St. Louis, Missouri, U.S.
- Position: Defender

Youth career
- 1970–1973: Saint Louis Billikens

Senior career*
Years	Team	Apps	(Gls)
1969–1974	St. Louis Kutis		
1975–1978	St. Louis Stars	69	(2)

International career
1974	United States	2	(0)
- * Club domestic league appearances and goals

Bob Matteson is an American retired soccer player who spent his career as a defender or defensive midfielder. He spent four seasons in the North American Soccer League and earned two caps with the U.S. national team.

== Youth and college ==
Matteson attended St. Mary's High School where he played on the boys' soccer team. Matteson and his teammates went undefeated during the 1969–1970 season, winning the Missouri state high school championship. In 1970, he entered St. Louis University, playing on the men's soccer team until 1973. At the time, St. Louis was the dominant college soccer team, winning the 1970, 1972 and 1973 NCAA championship. Matteson received individual recognition was a third team All American in 1971 and 1973. In addition to playing for his high school and collegiate teams, Matteson also played with St. Louis Kutis S.C. as a youth player from 1969 to 1974. In 1971, Matteson was with Kutis when they won the U.S. Amateur Cup.

== Professional ==
Matteson signed with the St. Louis Stars of the North American Soccer League in 1974. He played four seasons with the Stars, retiring from playing professionally in 1977.

== National team ==
Matteson earned two caps with the U.S. national team, both in September 1974. On September 5, he started in a 3–1 loss to Mexico. Dave Coskunian replaced him in the 84th minute. Three days later, he again started in another loss, this time 1–0, to Mexico. He was replaced by Barry Barto.

== Coaching ==
Matteson currently coaches youth soccer in St. Louis.

Matteson was inducted into the St. Louis Soccer Hall Fame in 2007.
