= Tony McLoughlin (footballer) =

English footballer

Personal information
- Full name: Anthony Joseph McLoughlin
- Date of birth: 24 September 1946
- Place of birth: Liverpool, England
- Date of death: August 2012 (aged 65)
- Position: Centre forward

Youth career
- Everton

Senior career*
Years	Team	Apps	(Gls)
1966–1967	Wrexham	29	(9)
1967–1968	Chester	4	(0)
1968–1970	Wigan Athletic	59	(36)
1971	Dallas Tornado	15	(6)
- * Club domestic league appearances and goals

Tony McLoughlin (24 September 1946 – August 2012) was a footballer who played as a centre forward in the Football League for Wrexham and Chester. He also played for Wigan Athletic, scoring 34 goals for the club in the Northern Premier League. He later moved to America to play for Dallas Tornado in the North American Soccer League.

== Playing career ==
McLoughlin was signed by Everton from South Liverpool in 1964. He did not make any first team appearances for Everton, but was part of the team that won the FA Youth Cup in 1965.

He played for the Dallas Tornado during the 1971 North American Soccer League season, helping them become league champions.
