= Bertrand Grell =

Trinidad and Tobago footballer (born 1944)

Personal information
- Date of birth: 22 August 1944 (age 82)
- Position: Midfielder

Senior career*
Years	Team	Apps	(Gls)
1968	Atlanta Chiefs		
1970–1971	Washington Darts	38	(3)
1971	Washington Darts (indoor)	2	(0)
1974–1975	Washington Diplomats	38	(0)

International career
1967–1969	Trinidad and Tobago	4	(0)
- * Club domestic league appearances and goals

Bertrand Grell (born 22 August 1944) is a Trinidad and Tobago former footballer. Bertrand Grell, who is the third of eleven children, grew up in Forest Reserve, St. Patrick, Trinidad. Throughout his childhood, Mr. Grell played soccer with his friends, and went on to train in the sport at the San Fernando Technical Institute while receiving his Third Year Special Certificate in Mechanical Engineering. He went on to a five-year apprenticeship with Texaco Trinidad Incorporated and joined their apprenticeship soccer team. After making the Trinidad National Team, Mr. Grell played in the 1967 Pan American games in Canada and won the Bronze medal.

At the age of 24, Bert decided to leave home and migrate to Canada...only to find out that American scouts from Atlanta, Georgia had traveled to his hometown in Trinidad to make him an offer to play soccer professionally. He contacted the scouts and in 1968 was signed onto the Atlanta Chiefs (of the North American Soccer League which played in the summer) and the Washington Darts (of the American Soccer League which played in the fall). In 1968, Bert and his team, the Chiefs, won the NASL Championship.

The Darts were the reason Bert first came to Washington; and he soon decided that this is where he wanted to make his home. He and his coach negotiated a trade with the Atlanta Chiefs so that Mr. Grell could stay in Washington, D.C. permanently. The Darts joined the NASL in 1970. In 1971 as a member of the Darts, Grell took part in the league's first ever indoor tournament, scoring no goals and earning two penalty minutes. Bert took a break from soccer in 1973 after deciding not to follow the Darts when the franchise moved to Miami, Florida. Bert joined the Washington Diplomats when they came to D.C. in 1974. He retired from professional soccer in 1976.

In 1969, Bert Grell began his career with the Courts as a Bailiff in the Criminal Division. The team trainer, Frank Gabrielli, had informed him of a position at the courthouse since practice was at night and the players had the days free to pursue other endeavors. Bert then moved to a clerk position in the Budget and Finance Office. His self-discipline and hard work moved him through the Budget and Finance Office working as an Accountant Technician, Supervisor, Deputy Finance Revenue Officer, to his current position as Budget Analyst. Two of Bert's children have worked in the D.C. Courts, Bryan in Civil Division and Leyla, who still works in Family Court. Bert also played touch football with the Courthouse Dragons, the Courts'football team. Bert has been an active member of the Trinidad Tobago Association of D.C. since 1968, holding positions as parliamentarian and currently Treasurer. He also has been active in youth soccer by coaching the All-Stars Soccer Team from 1976-1986 and serving as the District of Columbia Youth Soccer Commissioner of Ward 4 in 1986.

Bert believes that soccer taught him discipline, respect, and to have fun with what he was doing without expecting anything from it. The most memorable time for him during his soccer days were when he was playing in Trinidad just for the fun and love of the game without the worries money can bring. Other memories of travelling and meeting people from different countries put a smile on his face as well. When asked what he felt was his biggest accomplishment, Bert replied, "I left home as a young man not knowing what was in store for me and I was able to weather the storm and come out strong and successful. I grew a lot and learned a lot over the years."

Bert has worked in the court system for much of his career, with his work focusing on administrative processes and the effective resolution of legal and procedural matters. He has stated that professional satisfaction comes from setting goals, maintaining focus, and working toward their completion.

Bert's motto for life is, "You do not know where life will take you, it seems like yesterday I was a little boy in Trinidad not knowing what the future would bring and today I am living in D.C.— It's by the Grace of God."
