= Roy Turner (soccer) =

Soccer player (born 1943)

Personal information
- Date of birth: March 30, 1943 (age 83)
- Place of birth: Liverpool, England
- Position: Midfielder

Senior career*
Years	Team	Apps	(Gls)
1967	Philadelphia Spartans	14	(0)
1967	Toronto Falcons	9	(1)
1968	Cleveland Stokers		
1969–1978	Dallas Tornado	143	(5)

International career
1973	United States	2	(0)

Managerial career
- 1979–1986: Wichita Wings
- 1990–1991: Wichita Wings
- * Club domestic league appearances and goals

Roy Turner (born March 30, 1943) is a former soccer player who spent one season in the National Professional Soccer League, eleven in the North American Soccer League. He then went on to manage the Wichita Wings of Major Indoor Soccer League for eight seasons. Born in England, he earned two caps for the United States national team.

== Club career ==
Turner moved to the United States in 1967 to play for the Toronto Falcons of the National Professional Soccer League. He was traded to the Philadelphia Spartans eighteen games into the season. Following the 1967 season, the NPSL merged with the United Soccer Association to form the North American Soccer League. Turner then signed with the Cleveland Stokers of the NASL. He played in all games but 3. The Stokers were eventually beaten in the Conference Championship by Atlanta in sudden death over time. In 1969, he moved to the Dallas Tornado where he would remain until 1978. In 1971, Turner and his teammates won the NASL championship. In 1973, they again went to the title game but lost to the Philadelphia Atoms. Turner was a second-team All-Star in 1970, and an honourable mention (third team) in 1971 and 1973. He was known as the Iron man of the NASL playing most consecutive games at 131. Roy Turner is a fan of Everton FC.

== International career ==
Turner earned two caps with the United States national team in 1973.

== Coaching career ==
In 1979, Turner was hired as the head coach of the expansion Wichita Wings of the Major Indoor Soccer League (MISL). He became one of the most successful MISL coaches, remaining as head coach through the end of the 1985–1986 season. In his seven seasons as head coach, he took the team to the MISL semifinals five times. He also served as general manager for the Wings during those years. Following his stepping down as coach in 1986, he became president of the Wings organization. When the Wings entered a downward slide during the 1990–1991 season, Turner stepped back in as head coach thirty-four games into the season. On February 24, 1996, Turner resigned as president and general manager of the Wings. Sedgwick County, in which the Wings played, declared March 24, 1996, as Roy Turner Day.

== Post soccer career ==
In 1999, Turner became Tournament Director of the Wichita Open Golf Tournament, a position he still continues today. In June 2009, Turner was inducted into the Wichita Sports Hall of Fame In July 2019, Turner was inducted into the Indoor Soccer Hall of Fame In November 2019, Turner was inducted into the State of Kansas Sports Hall of Fame - the first Soccer person to do so. In February 2020, Turner was inducted into the Wichita Wings Hall of fame. In December 2019, the Wichita Open was awarded Tournament of the Year on the Korn Ferry Tour. In April 2020, the Wichita Open was named Sports Organization of the year by the Wichita Sports Hall of fame.
