= Mick Hoban =

Association footballer (born 1952)

Personal information
- Date of birth: 6 April 1952 (age 74)
- Place of birth: Tipton, England
- Position: Midfielder

Youth career
- 1969–1970: Aston Villa

Senior career*
Years	Team	Apps	(Gls)
1970–1971	Aston Villa	0	(0)
1971–1972	Atlanta Chiefs	35	(0)
1973	→ Atlanta Apollos	19	(3)
1974	Denver Dynamos	16	(3)
1975–1978	Portland Timbers	65	(0)
Total		135	(6)

International career
1973	United States	1	(0)

Managerial career
- 1978: University of Portland (assistant)
- * Club domestic league appearances and goals

Michael Hoban (born 6 April 1952) is a former professional soccer player who played as a midfielder. He began his career with Aston Villa in 1969 before moving to the North American Soccer League in 1971. He still lives in the States more than 40 years later and has worked as a football coach there since retiring. Born in England, he earned one cap with the US national team in 1973.

== Club career ==
=== England ===
Born in Tipton, Staffordshire, Hoban attended St. Chad's College in Wolverhampton.

As a schoolboy Hoban played for Brierley Hill and Dudley Schoolboys' teams, Staffordshire Schools, and, eventually, the England Schoolboys U19 team for two seasons. He was appointed England Schoolboys Captain in his final year with the team.

In 1969, he played with English first division club Aston Villa as a youth player. In 1970, he signed as a professional with AVFC. Mick debuted in Aston Villa's first team in an international friendly against Santos (Brazil) and was fortunate enough to be presented with Pele's jersey following the match. He was in the first team squad for other international friendlies against Gornik Zabrze(Poland) and FC Bayern Munich (Germany). He was substitute for Aston Villa for games against Port Vale and Fulham FC in the former English 3rd Division. He was loaned out to the Atlanta Chiefs during the summer of 1971 and, thus, started his career in the US.

=== United States ===
In 1971, Hoban played for the Atlanta Chiefs of the North American Soccer League during that season the Chiefs reached the final of the NASL championship and Hoban received an 'honorable mention' in the All-Star selection. In 1973, the Chiefs were sold to Omni Corporation (owners of the Atlanta Hawks in the NBA and the Atlanta Flames in the NHL)who renamed them the Atlanta Apollos. During his time with the Atlanta Apollos served as team captain and 'Business Manager'. At the end of the 1973 season, Hoban moved to the expansion Denver Dynamos for the 1974 season. Similarly, in Denver Hoban worked as the Director of Community Relations and served for part of the season as the team captain. In 1975, he was the first player signed by the expansion Portland Timbers . As he had with both of his other NASL teams, Hoban served as the Timbers Director of Community Relations. In 1978, he resigned his position with the Portland Timbers to accept the opportunity to start Nike's soccer program. Consequently, he became Nike's first-ever soccer employee in his position as Soccer Promotions Manager for the Beaverton, Oregon-based company.

== International career ==
Hoban earned one cap with the US national team in a 2–0 win over Canada on 5 August 1973.

Hoban joined fellow Atlanta Chiefs teammate and NASL All-Star, Paul Childs on the USMNT.

Their participation drew much attention in the British press given their UK citizenship.

== Team management ==
During his years playing in the NASL, Hoban also served in various front-office capacities in preparation for his career after soccer. He served as Business Manager with the Atlanta Apollos (NASL – 1973), Director of Community relations with the Denver Dynamos (1974) and the Portland Timbers (1976–1978).

== Coaching career ==
Hoban obtained his 'Preliminary Coaching License' from the Football Association (England) whilst playing as a professional with Aston Villa and successfully passed his US Soccer 'A' License in 1978, following his retirement as a player.

Hoban was an assistant coach in 1978 to former Timbers public relations director Dennis O'Meara for the University of Portland men's soccer team.

During his business career in the sporting goods industry he also served as Head Coach for Lake Oswego Soccer Club (Lake Oswego, OR) and St. Giles Soccer Club (Greenville, SC).

Hoban served as a Staff Coach for the Oregon Youth Soccer Association and was instrumental, along with 3 other coaches in Oregon, in conducting the first US Soccer licensed courses in Oregon.

While with Nike, Hoban formed the 'Oregon Soccer Coaches Association – OSCA' and arranged for various Nike partner's to conduct coaching sessions for members of 'OSCA'including representatives from Manchester United.

Since his retirement as a professional player Hoban has coached an amateur soccer team in Portland, Oregon and led them to championships at every level of the amateur game – 'Open, Over-30s, Over-40s' and numerous local amateur cup competitions.

== Post-playing career ==
=== Soccer Industry ===
After retiring from playing, Hoban was hired by Blue Ribbon Sports – which eventually became Nike, Inc., as the company's first-ever employee in soccer. As BRS's 'Soccer Promotions Manager' Hoban created sports marketing programs centered on the NASL, NCAA Soccer and US Soccer youth programs. Hoban led Nike in establishing the first-ever integrated youth soccer promotions program which resulted in support programs for targeted youth soccer associations and, ultimately, the Nike 'Friendship Cup'.

Hoban became Nike International's first-ever European Soccer Promotions Manager and in this position he was responsible for co-ordinating contracts with some of Europe's leading players at the time including Glenn Hoddle, Ian Rush, Mark Hateley, Steve Nichol, Steve Archibald, Charlie Nichoas, Arnold Muhren, Dossena and Nike's first ever successful footwear contract with Aston Villa, who became champions of Europe wearing Nike footwear in 1982.

He joined Umbro USA in the late 1980s and became vice-president of Soccer Promotions for the Greenville, SC based company. In this capacity he was instrumental in signing the first-ever women's soccer endorsement with Michelle Akers of the US Women's National Team.

Following his time with Umbro he left to become a soccer sports marketing consultant and in 2000 formed Soccer Solutions with a former co-worker from Umbro, Warren Mersereau. Hoban and Mersereau were joined later that year by a 3rd partner – Juergen Klinsmann.

While with Soccer Solutions, the partners worked with leading brands such as Coca-Cola, ING, McDonald's and adidas. In connection with Klinsmann's endorsement contract Soccer Solutions worked closely with MasterCard and Hyundai.

In November 2010 Hoban left Soccer Solutions to assume his previous role as an independent contractor working in soccer sports marketing and maintains a working relationship with his former partners and clients including adidas International.
