= Randy Horton =

Bermudian sportsman-politician

Personal information
- Full name: Kenneth Howard Randolph Horton
- Date of birth: 22 January 1945 (age 81)
- Place of birth: Somerset, Bermuda
- Height: 6 ft 2 in (1.88 m)
- Position: Forward

Senior career*
Years	Team	Apps	(Gls)
1966–1970	Somerset Trojans		
1970	Philadelphia Ukrainians		
1971–1974	New York Cosmos	52	(29)
1975	Washington Diplomats	18	(7)
1976	Hartford Bicentennials	4	(1)
Total		93	(52)

International career
1967–1969	Bermuda		

Managerial career
- 1982: George Washington
- * Club domestic league appearances and goals

The Honourable Randolph Horton JP MP

Member of the Bermudian Parliament for Constituency #32 – Southampton West
- Incumbent
- Assumed office 9 January 1998

The Honourable Kenneth Howard Randolph "Randy" Horton, JP, MP is a former soccer and cricket player from Bermuda who was formerly Speaker of the House of Assembly of Bermuda. He was named North American Soccer League Most Valuable Player in 1972.

== Biography ==
Horton was born on 22 January 1945 in Bermuda, the son of Kenneth Ray Horton and Dorothea Madeline Horton (born Simmons). His paternal grandparents were James Horton, from Saba and Josephine Elizabeth Horton (born Bailey), from St. Kitt's. He attended Culham College in England and Rutgers University and George Washington University in the United States.

== Sports ==
A top level cricketer offered trials to play for Worcestershire County Cricket Club, Horton turned down the opportunity to play English County cricket and Football League football for Huddersfield Town to stay in a warmer climate following completing his Oxford University Institute of Education Teacher Training Certificate from Culham College in Oxfordshire, England. He represented Bermuda national cricket team five times between 1969 and 1980.

=== Soccer ===
==== Club career ====
He signed with the New York Cosmos as was named NASL Rookie of the Year and First Team all-star for the 1971 season.

The Cosmos won the league championship in 1972 as Horton was named league MVP, as voted by the players, as he led the league in scoring with 22 points in 13 games. He also scored New York's first goal in their 2–1 Finals win over St. Louis. After the 1972 season Horton was offered a contract with Queens Park Rangers by their manager Gordon Jago. Horton decided to remain with Cosmos and complete his master's degree at Rutgers University in New Jersey. Horton played two more summers with the Cosmos before being traded to the Washington Diplomats for three first-round draft picks. After a season in Washington, he finished his NASL career playing for the Hartford Bicentennials.

In Bermuda, Horton played for and coached the Somerset Trojans and represented Bermuda.

He coached the George Washington women's soccer team in 1982.

== Politics ==
A member of Bermuda's Progressive Labour Party, Horton has been a member of the Bermuda Parliament since 1998 and has held cabinet positions as Community Affairs and Sports Minister, Education Minister, Environment Minister and Labour Home Affairs and Public Safety Minister. On 8 February 2013 he was elected unopposed as Speaker of the House of Assembly, becoming the first member of an opposition party to hold that position.

== Awards ==
- 1971 Rookie of the Year for the New York Cosmos
- 1971 First Team All-Star (NASL)
- 1972 Most Valuable Player in NASL
- 1972 Leading Scorer in NASL
- 1972 Leading Goal Scorer in NASL
- 1972 First Team All-Star (NASL)
- 1973 Second Team All-Star (NASL)
- 1974 Honorable Mention All-Star (NASL)
- 1974, Bermuda Jaycees' Outstanding Young Person Award
- 1981, Selected as one of Ten Most Admired Adults in Bermuda by the Annual Teen Conference
