= Henry Largie =

Jamaican footballer (1940–2020)

Personal information
- Date of birth: 31 December 1940
- Place of birth: Kingston, Jamaica
- Date of death: November, 2020
- Position: Defender

Senior career*
Years	Team	Apps	(Gls)
1959–1966	YMCA		
1966	Sudbury Italia		
1966	Baltimore St. Gerards		
1967	Atlanta Chiefs	8	(0)
1967–1968	→Washington Britannica (loan)		
1968	Baltimore Bays	6	(0)
1968	Washington Whips	20	(0)
1969–1972	Atlanta Chiefs	51	(12)

International career
1962–1968	Jamaica	15	(1)
- * Club domestic league appearances and goals

Henry Largie (December 31, 1940 – November, 2020) was a Jamaican footballer who played as a defender.

== Career ==
Largie played with YMCA football club in 1959, and continued to play until the 1966 season. In 1966, he played abroad in the National Soccer League with Sudbury Italia. After the conclusion of the NSL season he resumed play in the American Soccer League with Baltimore St. Gerards. In 1967, he played in the National Professional Soccer League with Atlanta Chiefs. In the winter of 1967 he returned to the ASL as he was loaned to Washington Britannica.

In 1968, he played in the newly formed North American Soccer League with Baltimore Bays. For the remainder of the season he played with league rivals Washington Whips. He returned to his former team Atlanta Chiefs for the 1969 season. He re-signed with Atlanta for the 1970 season. In 1971, he featured in the NASL Final, but Atlanta were defeated by Dallas Tornado in a best-of-three series. He played his final season with Atlanta in 1972.

== International career ==
Largie played with the Jamaica national football team, and played in the 1962 Central American and Caribbean Games. He also represented Jamaica in the 1966 FIFA World Cup qualification round. He also featured in the 1970 FIFA World Cup qualification round.
