= Tommy Youlden =

English footballer

Personal information
- Full name: Thomas Youlden
- Date of birth: 8 July 1949 (age 77)
- Place of birth: Islington, England
- Height: 6 ft 1 in (1.85 m)
- Position: Defender

Senior career*
Years	Team	Apps	(Gls)
1966–1968	Arsenal	0	(0)
1968–1972	Portsmouth	89	(1)
1972–1977	Reading	163	(3)
1977–1981	Aldershot	123	(1)
- Addlestone
Total		375	(5)
- * Club domestic league appearances and goals

Thomas Youlden (born 8 July 1949) is an English former footballer.

Youlden was educated at Holloway School. He played in the Football League for Aldershot, Portsmouth and Reading. Youlden spent the 1971 season on loan to the Dallas Tornado of the North American Soccer League. After his playing career was over he became a youth coach at Chelsea.
