= Delroy Scott =

Jamaican footballer (1947-2018)

Personal information
- Date of birth: 22 January 1947
- Place of birth: Jamaica
- Date of death: 24 July 2018 (aged 71)
- Place of death: Florida, U.S.
- Height: 5 ft 8 in (1.73 m)
- Position: Midfielder

Senior career*
Years	Team	Apps	(Gls)
- Cavalier
1967–1970	Atlanta Chiefs	69	(2)

International career
1965–1969	Jamaica		
- * Club domestic league appearances and goals

Delroy Scott (22 January 1947 – 24 July 2018) was a Jamaican footballer who played at both professional and international levels as a midfielder. He later coached.

== Career ==
Scott played with Cavalier, and then spent four seasons in the United States with the Atlanta Chiefs, making 69 appearances.

He also spent time with the Jamaican national side, appearing in eight FIFA World Cup qualifying matches.

He later worked as a high school coach.
