= Denver Dynamos =

Defunct American soccer club

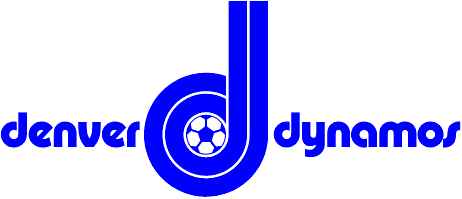
- Full name: Denver Dynamos
- Nickname: The Dynamos
- Founded: 1974
- Dissolved: 1975; 51 years ago
- Stadium: Mile High Stadium; Jefferson County Stadium
- Capacity: 75,000 (Mile High); 10,000 (Jefferson)
- League: North American Soccer League
Home colors	Away colors

The Denver Dynamos were a soccer team based in Denver that played in the NASL from 1974 to 1975. Their home field was Mile High Stadium. After the 1975 season, they moved to Minnesota and became the Minnesota Kicks.

== History ==
Between the 1973 and 1974 North American Soccer League seasons the league added eight new expansion teams, including one located in Denver. English full-back and NASL veteran Ken Bracewell was hired as player-coach and Oldham Athletic A.F.C. players Andy Lochhead and Ian Wood were brought over on loan. The team lost its first game to the Toronto Metros 3-2 and finished the 1974 season in last place of the Central Division with a record of five wins and fifteen losses. During the season, the Dynamos went 523 minutes without scoring a goal, setting a record that held until the Philadelphia Fury went 524 minutes and 18 seconds without scoring during the 1978 NASL season. Following the season, GM Norman Sutherland announced that Bracewell's contract would not be renewed, effectively firing the head coach. On October 22, 1974, Sutherland, who had played for East Fife F.C. in Scotland and had won the 1968 and 1969 American Soccer League titles as manager of the Washington Darts, was named coach for the 1975 season. However, less than five months later and a week before training camp, Sutherland announced his resignation as both coach and general manager of the organization. Less than a week later, John Young, who had coached the Miami Toros for three seasons, was named head coach and Joe Echelle was named general manager, a position he had held previously for four years with the Dallas Tornado. For the 1975 NASL season, the Dynamos finished in third place of the Central Division with a record of nine wins and thirteen losses. The team played two season at Mile High Stadium, averaging 4,840 fans a game in 1974 and 3,654 during the 1975 season. On November 18, 1975, Jack Crocker announced that a group led by him would be purchasing the club and moving it to Minnesota for the 1976 season, the sale was completed on November 25.

== Coaches ==
- (England) Ken Bracewell 1974
- (Scotland) John Young 1975

== Year-by-year ==
Year	League	W	L	T	Pts	Reg. season	Playoffs
1974	NASL	5	15	0	49	3rd, Central Division	did not qualify
1975	NASL	9	13	—	85	3rd, Central Division	did not qualify

== Honors ==
NASL All-Stars

- 1975: Hugh Fisher (honorable mention)

U.S. Soccer Hall of Fame

- 2003: Patrick Ntsoelengoe
