= Dave Metchick =

English footballer

Personal information
- Full name: David John Metchick
- Date of birth: 14 August 1943 (age 83)
- Place of birth: Bakewell, England
- Position: Midfielder

Youth career
- 1959–1961: Fulham

Senior career*
Years	Team	Apps	(Gls)
1961–1964	Fulham	47	(9)
1964–1967	Leyton Orient	75	(15)
1967–1968	Peterborough United	38	(6)
1968–1970	Queens Park Rangers	3	(1)
1970	Atlanta Chiefs	28	(11)
1970–1971	Arsenal	0	(0)
1971	Atlanta Chiefs	28	(11)
1972	Miami Gatos	9	(0)
1973	Atlanta Apollos	18	(2)
1973–1975	Brentford	61	(4)
- Barnet
1975–1976	Hendon	34	(2)
- Hillingdon Borough
- Woking
1976–1977	Weymouth	16	(0)
1978	Brentford	0	(0)
Total		279	(48)

International career
1961	England Youth	6	(2)
- * Club domestic league appearances and goals

David John Metchick (born 14 August 1943) is an English former professional footballer who played as a midfielder in England and the United States. In England, he played in the Football League for Leyton Orient, Brentford, Fulham, Peterborough United and Queens Park Rangers, and in the United States he played in the North American Soccer League for Atlanta Apollos and Miami Gatos. He was capped by England at youth level.

== Club career ==
After beginning his career as an apprentice with Football League club Fulham, Metchick turned professional in 1961 and made 47 league appearances and scored 9 goals for the club. He later played for Leyton Orient, Peterborough United, Queens Park Rangers. Metchick played for North American Soccer League club Atlanta Chiefs in 1970 and returned to England to play with the reserve team at First Division club Arsenal during the 1970–71 season. Either side of a spell with Miami Gatos in 1972, Metchick made a return to Atlanta Chiefs in 1971 and 1973. Metchick returned to England in 1973 to play for Fourth Division club Brentford. After his release in 1975, Metchick wound down his career in non-League football. He returned to Brentford on a non-contract basis between January and March 1978, but did not make a first team appearance.

== International career ==
In 1961, Metchick won six caps and scored two goals for England Youth.

== Personal life ==
Metchick is Jewish and worked as a black cab driver.

== Honours ==
Atlanta Chiefs

- North American Soccer League Southern Division: 1971

Individual

- North American Soccer League All-Stars First Team: 1970
- North American Soccer League All-Stars Second Team: 1972

== Career statistics ==
Appearances and goals by club, season and competition
Club	Season	League			National Cup		League Cup		Other		Total	
Club	Season	Division	Apps	Goals	Apps	Goals	Apps	Goals	Apps	Goals	Apps	Goals
Fulham	1961–62	First Division	19	2	0	0	0	0	—		19	2
Fulham	1962–63	First Division	9	0	0	0	0	0	—		9	0
Fulham	1963–64	First Division	8	1	0	0	0	0	—		8	1
Fulham	1964–65	First Division	11	6	0	0	0	0	—		11	6
Fulham	Total		47	9	0	0	0	0	—		47	9
Leyton Orient	Total		75	15	0	0	0	0	—		75	15
Peterborough United	1966–67	Third Division	14	2	—		—		—		14	2
Peterborough United	1967–68	Third Division	24	4	2	0	1	0	—		27	4
Peterborough United	Total		38	6	2	0	1	0	—		41	6
Queens Park Rangers	1968–69	First Division	2	0	0	0	0	0	—		2	0
Queens Park Rangers	1969–70	Second Division	1	1	0	0	1	0	—		2	1
Queens Park Rangers	Total		3	1	0	0	1	0	—		4	1
Atlanta Chiefs	1970	North American Soccer League	20	8	—		—		—		20	8
Atlanta Chiefs	1971	North American Soccer League	8	3	—		—		—		8	3
Miami Gatos	1972	North American Soccer League	9	0	—		—		—		9	0
Atlanta Apollos	1973	North American Soccer League	18	2	—		—		—		18	2
Atlanta Apollos	Atlanta Chiefs/Apollos total		46	13	—		—		—		46	13
Brentford	1973–74	Fourth Division	34	3	1	0	—		—		35	3
Brentford	1974–75	Fourth Division	27	1	1	0	2	0	—		30	1
Brentford	Total		61	4	2	0	2	0	—		65	4
Hendon	1975–76	Isthmian League First Division	34	2	3	0	—		9 (Note: 5 appearances in FA Trophy, 2 appearances in Middlesex Senior Charity Cup, 2 appearances in London Senior Cup)	0	46	2
Career total			313	50	7	0	4	0	9	0	333	50
