= Phillip Tinney =

Scottish footballer

Personal information
- Date of birth: 15 January 1945 (age 81)
- Height: 5 ft 9 in (1.75 m)
- Position: Winger

Youth career
- Liverpool

Senior career*
Years	Team	Apps	(Gls)
1964–1965	Dundee	0	(0)
1965–1966	Heracles	3	(1)
1967	Philadelphia Spartans	14	(1)
1970–1972	Dallas Tornado	58	(4)
- Wigan Athletic
Total		75	(6)
- * Club domestic league appearances and goals

Phillip Tinney (born 15 January 1945) is a Scottish former professional footballer who played as a winger.

== Early and personal life ==
Tinney was from Dundee, and attended St Stephen's and St John's schools in the city.

== Career ==
Tinney spent his early career with Liverpool and Dundee. He made one first-team appearance for Dundee, in the Summer Cup, where he scored a goal. He then played for Dutch club Heracles, becoming the first British player to score in the Eredivisie. After leaving Heracles in January 1966, he was subject to a five-year FIFA ban for breaking his contract. He subsequently played in the United States for the Philadelphia Spartans and the Dallas Tornado. His career was ended by a broken leg whilst playing for Wigan Athletic. After retiring as a player he worked in residential childcare in Merseyside.
