= Oreco =

Brazilian footballer

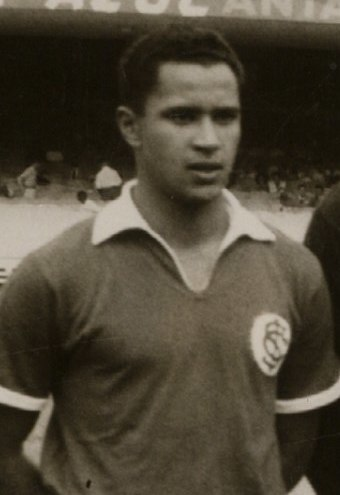

Personal information
- Full name: Valdemar Rodrigues Martins
- Date of birth: June 13, 1932
- Place of birth: Santa Maria, Brazil
- Date of death: April 3, 1985 (aged 52)
- Place of death: Ituverava, Brazil
- Position: Left-back

Senior career*
Years	Team	Apps	(Gls)
1949	Internacional (Santa Maria)		
1950–1957	Internacional		
1957–1965	Corinthians		
1965–1968	Millonarios		
1968–1970	Toluca		
1970–1972	Dallas Tornado	38	(0)

International career
	Brazil	9	
Medal record
Men's Football
Representing Brazil
FIFA World Cup
Winner	1958 Sweden
South American Championship
Runner-up	1957 Peru
Panamerican Championship
Winner	1956 Mexico
- * Club domestic league appearances and goals

Valdemar Rodrigues Martíns, best known as Oreco, (13 June 1932 – 3 April 1985) was a Brazilian footballer who played primarily as a left-back. He was on the winning team of the 1958 FIFA World Cup. Oreco was born in Santa Maria, Rio Grande do Sul and died in 1985 in Ituverava, São Paulo state.

== Clubs ==
- Internacional (Santa Maria): 1949
- Internacional: 1950–1957
- Corinthians: 1957–1965
- Millonarios: 1965–1968
- Toluca: 1968–1970
- Dallas Tornado: 1970–1972

== Honours ==
Internacional

- Campeonato Gaúcho Champions: 1950, 1951, 1952, 1953, 1955

Dallas Tornado

- NASL Championship: 1971.

Brazil

- Panamerican Championship: 1956
- FIFA World Cup: 1958
