= Vic Rouse (footballer, born 1936) =

Welsh footballer and manager

Personal information
- Full name: Raymond Victor Rouse
- Date of birth: 16 March 1936 (age 90)
- Place of birth: Swansea, Wales
- Position: Goalkeeper

Youth career
- Millwall

Senior career*
Years	Team	Apps	(Gls)
1954–1956	Millwall	0	(0)
1956–1963	Crystal Palace	238	(0)
1963	Northampton Town	0	(0)
1963–1965	Oxford United	22	(0)
1965–1967	Leyton Orient	40	(0)
1967–1972	Atlanta Chiefs	61	(0)
Total		361	(0)

International career
1959	Wales	1	(0)

Managerial career
- 1969–1972: Atlanta Chiefs
- 1972–xxxx: Metropolitan Police
- * Club domestic league appearances and goals

Raymond Victor Rouse (born 16 March 1936) is a Welsh former footballer and coach who played at both professional and international levels as a goalkeeper, before becoming a football manager.

== Playing career ==
Born in Swansea, Rouse played in the English Football League for Crystal Palace, Oxford United and Leyton Orient. He was also a player with Millwall (as an amateur) and Northampton Town without making a league appearance for either club. Rouse later played in the North American Soccer League for the Atlanta Chiefs.

Rouse earned one cap at full international level for Wales. Rouse became the first ever international player from the old Fourth Division when he appeared in 1959.

== Coaching career ==
Rouse had been attracted to the Chiefs as part of Phil Woosnam's team when his Welsh compatriot was appointed the club's first head coach in 1967. Woosnam left the Chiefs at the end of the 1968 NASL to become Commissioner of the NASL and ahead of the 1969 season, Rouse was appointed player-manager of the Chiefs. After retiring as a player in 1972, he returned to England to become manager of Metropolitan Police. He was still managing Metropolitan Police as of 1982.

== Personal life ==
Rouse's parents were English. His father, also called Vic, was a professional footballer who had played in Wales and had returned to Wales by the time Rouse was born in 1936.
