= Art Welch =

Jamaican footballer (born 1944)

Personal information
- Date of birth: 16 April 1944 (age 82)
- Place of birth: Kingston, Jamaica
- Position: Striker

Senior career*
Years	Team	Apps	(Gls)
- Cavaliers FC
1967–1969	Baltimore Bays	45	(16)
1970–1973	Atlanta Chiefs/Apollos	60	(21)
1974–1975	San Jose Earthquakes	41	(6)
1976	Vancouver Whitecaps	11	(0)
1976	San Diego Jaws	6	(1)
1977	Washington Diplomats	14	(1)
1979–1980	Wichita Wings (indoor)	11	(4)
1980	Washington Diplomats	0	(0)
1980–1981	San Francisco Fog (indoor)	0	(0)
Total		188	(49)
- * Club domestic league appearances and goals

Art Welch (born 16 April 1944) is a Jamaican former professional soccer player who played in the North American Soccer League and Major Indoor Soccer League.

He began his career in Jamaica with Cavaliers FC, alongside twin brother Asher.

In May 1977, the Las Vegas Quicksilvers traded Welch to the Washington Diplomats in exchange for Tom Galati.

Welch also represented the Jamaica national team in international play, appearing in qualifying matches for the 1966 and 1970 World Cup tournaments.
