= Barrie Lynch =

English footballer

Personal information
- Full name: Barrie John Lynch
- Date of birth: 8 June 1951 (age 75)
- Place of birth: Northfield, Birmingham, England
- Position: Full back

Youth career
- Rubery Hill School
- Cross Castle
- 1967–1968: Aston Villa

Senior career*
Years	Team	Apps	(Gls)
1968–1971	Aston Villa	2	(0)
1969	→ Oldham Athletic	0	(0)
1971	Atlanta Chiefs	21	(8)
1972–1973	Grimsby Town	14	(0)
1973–1975	Scunthorpe United	64	(0)
1975–1977	Portland Timbers	38	(2)
1975–1977	Torquay United	70	(2)
- * Club domestic league appearances and goals

Barrie John Lynch (born 8 June 1951) is an English former professional footballer who played as a full back.

== Career ==
Born in Northfield, Birmingham, Lynch played youth football for Rubery Hill School and Cross Castle, before playing professionally in England and the United States for Aston Villa, Oldham Athletic, the Atlanta Chiefs and the Portland Timbers.
