= Nick Papadakis =

Soccer player (born 1943)

Personal information
- Full name: Nickolas Papadakis
- Date of birth: 6 March 1943 (age 83)
- Place of birth: Athens, Greece
- Position: Striker

College career
Years	Team	Apps	(Gls)
1963–1966	Hartwick Hawks		

Senior career*
Years	Team	Apps	(Gls)
1968–1972	Atlanta Chiefs	74	(19)
1973	Atlanta Apollos	3	(0)
1975	Tampa Bay Rowdies (indoor)	2	(2)

International career
1968	Canada	4	(2)
- * Club domestic league appearances and goals

Nick Papadakis (born 6 March 1943) is a former professional soccer player who played in the North American Soccer League. Born in Greece, he earned four caps for the Canadian national side. He is the current CEO of the USL First Division.

== Playing career ==
Papadakis attended Hartwick College where he is the all-time points leader He was a 1963 and 1966 Honorable Mention (third team) All American. In 1995, he was inducted into the Hartwick Hawks Hall of Fame. In 1968, he signed with the Atlanta Chiefs of the North American Soccer League. In 1973, new ownership renamed the team the Atlanta Apollos. He finished his professional career with the Tampa Bay Rowdies in 1975.

Papadakis earned four caps for the Canada national team in 1968, scoring two goals.

== Administrative career ==
In August 2009, NuRock Soccer Holdings, co-owned by Alec Papadakis and Rob Hoskins, purchased the USL First Division. The group installed Nick Papadakis as league commercial director.
