= Dick Hall (soccer) =

Footballer (born 1945)

Personal information
- Full name: Richard Hall
- Date of birth: 3 July 1945 (age 81)
- Place of birth: Weymouth, Dorset, England
- Position: Defender

Senior career*
Years	Team	Apps	(Gls)
1962–1967	Weymouth	164	(6)
1967–1968	Bournemouth & Boscombe Athletic	11	(0)
1968–1970	Weymouth	88	(1)
1970–1976	Dallas Tornado	122	(0)
Total		385	(7)

International career
1973–1975	United States	4	(0)

Managerial career
- 1971–2010: Greenhill School
- * Club domestic league appearances and goals

Richard Hall (born 3 July 1945) is a former professional footballer who played as a defender. He played seven seasons with the Dallas Tornado in the North American Soccer League. Born in England, he earned four caps with the United States national team between 1973 and 1975. He later coached high school boys soccer in Dallas, Texas.

== Club career ==
In 1970 Hall moved to the U.S. from England and signed with the Dallas Tornado of the North American Soccer League (NASL). He spent the next seven seasons in Dallas. In 1971 the Tornado won the NASL championship as Hall was named a first team All Star. He was named a second team All Star in 1972 and 1974 before being named to the first team for a second time in 1975.

== International career ==
After gaining his U.S. citizenship, Hall earned four caps with the U.S. national team between 1973 and 1975. His first game was a 2–0 loss to Mexico on 16 October 1973. He played in two losses to Haiti in November 1972. His last game came in a 6–0 loss to Argentina on 21 August 1975.

== Coaching career ==
In 1971 Hall became the boys' soccer coach at Greenhill School in Addison, Texas. In his thirty-six seasons at Greenhill, Hall has won over five hundred games and fifteen Southwest Preparatory Conference titles . He retired from coaching in 2010.
