= Kaizer Motaung =

South African football icon (born 1944)

- Born: 16 October 1944 (age 82); Soweto, South Africa
- Children: 4: Kaizer Motaung Junior; Bobby Motaung; Jessica Motaung
Association football career
- Position: Forward
Senior career*
Years	Team	Apps	(Gls)
- Orlando Pirates
1968–1971	Atlanta Chiefs	63	(32)
1974–1975	Denver Dynamos	35	(11)
- * Club domestic league appearances and goals

Kaizer Motaung OIS (born 16 October 1944) is a former South African association football player and founder of Kaizer Chiefs FC, of which he is chairman and managing director. He was nicknamed "Chincha Guluva".

== Early life ==
Born in the Orlando East section of Soweto, Motaung first played professional football at the age of 16, for the Orlando Pirates FC.

His entry into international football occurred in 1968, when Atlanta Chiefs founder and owner, Dick Cecil, and former West Ham United player Phil Woosnam, who was manager of the Atlanta Chiefs franchise in the then-recently formed North American Soccer League (NASL), recruited Motaung after team trials in Zambia.

== NASL career ==
Despite struggling to come to terms with the weather and overcoming injury, Motaung made his North American debut for the Atlanta Chiefs as a substitute in a friendly game against Manchester City, scoring two goals in the process. He continued to play brilliantly for the rest of the season, scoring sixteen goals in fifteen matches, making him the top scorer in the league that season. As a result of this achievement, he was voted "Rookie of the Year" and gained a place on the NASL's All Star Team. In 1975, he returned to the NASL to play two seasons with the Denver Dynamos.

== Kaizer Chiefs ==
When Motaung returned to his home country in 1970, he decided to start his own professional soccer team. Motaung named his club "Kaizer Chiefs" after himself and his former NASL team. Another South African, Jomo Sono, also a former player for Orlando Pirates, joined an NASL side New York Cosmos in 1977. He returned to form his own professional soccer team which he named Jomo Cosmos after himself and his former NASL team, the New York Cosmos. Jomo Cosmos was however relegated in the 2011/12 edition of the South African Premier Soccer League.

Despite early setbacks and opposition, Motaung succeeded in assembling a good mix of veterans and talented rookies and the club soon became a force to be reckoned with. The Kaizer Chiefs soon had a large following.

Within a short time, the Kaizer Chiefs became the most successful team in South Africa, winning more than 78 trophies and gaining an estimated fourteen million supporters throughout the country.

One of Kaizer Chiefs' biggest achievements was winning the African Cup Winners' Cup in 2001.

== Football administrator ==
Motaung has also been active in South African football administration, having served on both the National Soccer League (NSL) and South African Football Association(SAFA) executives.

In addition, Motaung co-founded (with Orlando Pirates' Irvin Khoza) the South African Premier League (PSL) in 1996, which helped bring more sponsors and money into South African professional football.

Motaung currently still serves as a member of the PSL's Board of Governors, while also still running Kaizer Chiefs and being on SAFA's executive committee. He has also indicated that he would accept a position with the Confederation of African Football (CAF) or on world football's governing body, FIFA.

Motaung was voted 73rd in the Top 100 Great South Africans in 2004. He also assisted South Africa's 2010 World Cup Bid Company and was a member of the delegation that went to the FIFA head office in Zürich to be declared the winning bid. Subsequently, he was also appointed as a member of the local organising committee for the 2010 event. Also in 2004, Motaung was given the Entrepreneurial Leadership Award by Henley Management College, South Africa.

In February 2005 it was announced that Motaung would join the board of Primedia Limited as a non-executive director. Primedia is South Africa's largest private media holding company and owns 40% of Kaizer Chiefs. He has also served as a director on the boards of many other companies such as Royal Beechnut, Simba, New Age Beverages and Get Ahead.

== Awards and recognition ==
Motaung was appointed a member of South Africa's Order of Ikhamanga, Silver class. Kaizer was also awarded an honorary doctorate in 2022.
