= Mike Renshaw =

American soccer player (1948–2021)

Personal information
- Full name: Michael Lawrence Renshaw
- Date of birth: April 28, 1948
- Place of birth: Manchester, England
- Date of death: February 17, 2021 (aged 72)
- Place of death: Texas, U.S.
- Position: Left winger

Youth career
- Blackpool

Senior career*
| Years | Team | Apps | (Gls) |
| –1968 | Blackpool | 0 | (0) |
| 1968 | Margate | 0 | (0) |
| 1968–1969 | Rhyl | | |
| 1968–1976 | Dallas Tornado | 127 | (20) |

International career
| 1973 | United States | 2 | (0) |

Managerial career
- 1978–1981: Dallas Tornado (assistant)
- 1981: Dallas Tornado
- * Club domestic league appearances and goals

Michael Lawrence Renshaw (April 28, 1948 – February 17, 2021) was a soccer player who played as a left winger. He began as a youth player with Blackpool before moving to the United States to join the Dallas Tornado of the North American Soccer League in 1968. He also spent time with Margate F.C. and Rhyl F.C. Born in England, he earned two caps with the United States national team in 1973 despite not being a U.S. citizen at the time. Finally, he coached the Dallas Tornado in 1981.

== Club career ==
Renshaw grew up in Manchester before signing with Blackpool. He never cracked the first-team lineup but played regularly for the youth team against the likes of Manchester United, Liverpool and Everton. In 1967 at age 19, he answered a newspaper advertisement looking for top class young players interested in moving to the United States to play professional soccer. He sufficiently impressed Bob Kap at the trial to be offered a position with the Dallas Tornado of the newly established North American Soccer League. That team started pre-season training in Madrid, Spain in August 1967 before embarking on an unprecedented seven-month, twenty-nine-game world tour visiting over twenty countries. He gained a starting position with the Tornado during the 1968 season. At the end of the season, the league was in danger of collapsing and Renshaw returned to England, where he gained a trial with Margate F.C. He played one game, a Southern Football League Cup tie with Ashford F.C. on 23 December 1968, but decided to return to the north of England. He then moved to League of Wales club Rhyl F.C. for the remainder of the 1968–69 season. He returned to the Tornado in the summer of 1969 and remained with it until he retired in 1976. In 1971, the Tornado won the NASL championship over the Atlanta Chiefs. Renshaw scored the winning goal in the third, and deciding, game of the series, the only outdoor professional championship ever won by a Dallas soccer team. In 1975, he was in the starting line-up for the Dallas Tornado against the New York Cosmos in Pele's first game for New York (a 2–2 tie) later that season he scored against Pele's Cosmos in a 3–2 Tornado win at Texas Stadium. On a personal level, he was a second team All Star in 1970 and an honorable mention in 1971 and 1972. Renshaw was plagued with bad knees for several years and in 1976, doctors advised him that he could no longer play without risking lifelong damage. He took their advice and stopped playing professionally.

In addition to his outdoor career, Renshaw also played indoor soccer with the Tornado. He was named the MVP of the NASL's first ever indoor tournament in 1971. He led the tournament in scoring with two goals and an assist in two games. A few years later he scored a hat trick against Philadelphia Atoms in a nationally televised game and was then named to the All Tournament team during the 1975 NASL Indoor tournament played at the Cow Palace in San Francisco. Renshaw went on to earn an 'A' coaching licence from the United States Soccer Federation, the highest qualification available in the United States.

== International career ==
In 1973, Renshaw earned two full caps with the U.S. national team when he was called up for a tour of Europe. His first game was a 4–0 loss to Bermuda on 17 March 1973. He came on for Dave Coskunian. His second was a 4–0 loss to Poland three days later. In addition to these two games, he also played four games for the United States against under 23 national teams (Poland and Germany) and club teams, including Lazio in Rome, Italy. The U.S. Soccer Federation had failed to check Renshaw's citizenship before the tour, assuming that he had gained it since he had been in the U.S. for five years. They discovered that he was neither a U.S. citizen and was in the country with an expired work visa when the team went through the immigration check returning from Europe. Years later when asked if he knew he was ineligible to play for the U.S. Renshaw stated, "Of course I knew, I just figures 'what the hell, I guess they know what they're doing'. I loved playing for the USA."

== Coaching career ==
In 1977, Tornado coach Al Miller brought Renshaw in as his assistant. In 1980, Miller quit the team and Renshaw was promoted to head coach. Quietly, Lamar Hunt had decided to fold the Tornado at the end of the 1981 season and he was reluctant to spend much money on new acquisitions. The Tornado had also lost two of their best American players, Tony Bellinger and Steve Petcher (three had to be on the field at all times) to the new MISL (Major Indoor Soccer League). A 3rd American, and the team's leading scorer from the previous season, Njego Pesa held out for a new contract and missed all of pre-season and the start of the regular season. Thus the team was much weakened going into the 1981 season. Renshaw lasted half the season but was fired on 4 July 1980 after the team, having started with two wins in their first three games, failed to win for sixteen straight games. Renshaw remained in the Dallas area, raised a family and became involved in youth soccer. Renshaw earned an "A" level licence from the United States Soccer Federation, the highest licence available in the United States.

== Post-soccer career ==
Renshaw did color commentary, with Norm Hitzges doing play-by-play, for the Dallas Sidekicks of the Major Indoor Soccer League. He and Hitzges were nominated for an ESPY award for the best sports commentary of 1987 for covering the MISL title game on HSE (Home Sports Entertainment) (SIDENOTE: The ESPY Awards were not in existence until 1993). Renshaw co-owned a wine-import business with former Tornado goalkeeper Kenny Cooper, Sr. and continued to have a strong interest in the antique furniture business. Renshaw stayed very involved in the development of youth soccer in the North Texas area and coached at a well-known Dallas private school. Renshaw coached the women's varsity soccer team to four consecutive SPC State Championships in 2014/15/16 and 17. Mike Renshaw was named, in an article in the Fort Worth Star Telegram, as one of the ten most influential people in North Texas soccer history (notation requested). He was also mentioned in a Dallas Morning News article as being one of the eleven best all-time Dallas Tornado players. (notation requested)

He died on 17 February 2021, at the age of 72.
