= Philadelphia Spartans =

- Full name: Philadelphia Spartans
- Nickname: Spartans
- Founded: 1967
- Dissolved: 1968
- Stadium: Temple Stadium
- Capacity: 34,200
- Owner: Art Rooney
- League: National Professional Soccer League
Home colors	Away colors

The Philadelphia Spartans were a soccer team that was a charter member of the non-FIFA sanctioned National Professional Soccer League (NPSL) in 1967. Based in Philadelphia, Pennsylvania they played their home games at Temple Stadium in North Philadelphia and were owned by Pittsburgh Steelers owner Art Rooney. Having incurred losses of $500,000, the Spartans folded when the NPSL merged with the rival United Soccer Association to form the North American Soccer League.

== History ==
In 1966, several groups of entrepreneurs were exploring the idea of forming a professional soccer league in the United States and Canada. Two of these groups merged to form the National Professional Soccer League (NPSL) and franchise rights were awarded to ten ownership groups. Pittsburgh Steelers owner Art Rooney and his brother John were awarded the rights to the Philadelphia franchise. On January 29, 1967, John Rooney announced the team would use the name Spartans and that John Szep would be head coach. After leading the team to a record of eight wins, eight losses and eight draws, Szep resigned his position after a dispute with the team ownership over signing a player. The next day, the Spartans named Argentine defender Rubén Navarro as player-coach for the remainder of the season. With Navarro in charge, the team went on to win six of its final eight games of the season. The team finished the season in second place of the Eastern Division, missing first on goal difference to the Baltimore Bays, with a record of fourteen wins, nine loses and nine draws and an average attendance of 5,261. Rubén Navarro was voted outstanding player for the season.

Following the 1967 season, the NPSL merged with the United Soccer Association (USA) to form the North American Soccer League (NASL). Spartans owners requested a one year leave before joining the new league, but this was denied. Having incurred losses of $500,000, club president John Rooney announced the team was discontinuing operations. A grassroots effort to save the team was organized by team PR director Walk Aikens, but the Rooney family were not involved. Many Spartans players—including Ruben Navarro, John Best, and Peter Short—were signed by the Cleveland Stokers for the 1968 NASL season.

== Media Coverage ==
The Spartans had perhaps the best television coverage of any NPSL team. CBS carried 6 Spartans' matches, 5 at home, carried on the then-CBS owned-and-operated WCAU. An additional 14 (8 home and 6 away) were on WPHL-TV.

== Year-by-year ==
Year	League	W	L	T	Pts	Reg. season	Playoffs
1967	NPSL	14	9	9	157	2nd, Eastern Division	did not qualify

== ASL ==
The second Philadelphia Spartans was an American soccer club based in Philadelphia, Pennsylvania that was a member of the American Soccer League.

=== Year-by-year ===
Year	Division	League	Reg. season	Playoffs	U.S. Open Cup
1969	2	ASL	2nd, Southern	did not qualify	did not enter
1970	2	ASL	2nd	No playoff	did not enter
1971	2	ASL	3rd	No playoff	did not enter
1972	2	ASL	1st, Southern	Conference Finals	did not enter
1973	2	ASL	4th, Mid-Atlantic	did not qualify	did not enter

== See also ==
- Philadelphia Atoms
- Philadelphia Fury (1978–80)
- Philadelphia Fury
- Philadelphia Union
