= Ron Newman =

English footballer (1936–2018)

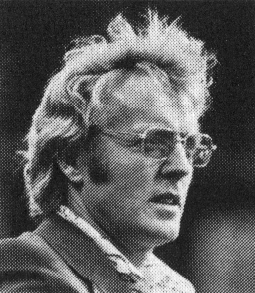
- Newman circa 1975

Personal information
- Full name: Ronald Vernon Newman
- Date of birth: 19 January 1934
- Place of birth: Fareham, England
- Date of death: 27 August 2018 (aged 84)
- Place of death: Tampa, Florida, U.S.
- Positions: Outside left; outside right

Senior career*
Years	Team	Apps	(Gls)
–1955	Woking		
1955–1961	Portsmouth	108	(21)
1961–1962	Leyton Orient	14	(1)
1962–1963	Crystal Palace	6	(0)
1963–1967	Gillingham	93	(20)
1967–1968	Atlanta Chiefs	34	(4)
1968–1974	Dallas Tornado	20	(2)
1979	Fort Lauderdale Strikers	1	(0)

Managerial career
- 1969–1975: Dallas Tornado
- 1976: Los Angeles Skyhawks
- 1977–1979: Fort Lauderdale Strikers
- 1980: Miami Americans
- 1980–1994: San Diego Sockers
- 1995: Arizona Sandsharks
- 1996–1999: Kansas City Wizards
- * Club domestic league appearances and goals

Ronald Vernon Newman (19 January 1934 – 27 August 2018) was an English professional association football player and coach. He is a member of the American National Soccer Hall of Fame.

== Life ==
Born in Fareham, Newman, after non-league football with Woking, played in the Football League with Portsmouth, Leyton Orient, Crystal Palace and Gillingham. While at Gillingham he became the second player ever to be introduced as a substitute in English professional football.

In 1967 Newman came to the United States to play for the Atlanta Chiefs in the National Professional Soccer League (where he was team MVP in 1967), before being traded to the Dallas Tornado during the 1968 season. In addition to playing for the Tornado, Newman also served as an assistant coach during the 1968 season.

The next year, Newman became both the head coach, as well as a player, for the Tornado until 1974. At the end of that season, he retired from playing and became the team's dedicated head coach for the 1975 season. He took the Tornado to the NASL championship in 1971. In 1976, he coached the Los Angeles Skyhawks of the American Soccer League (ASL), taking them to the ASL championship, making Newman the only coach to win both an NASL and ASL title. He then returned to the NASL in 1977 to coach the Fort Lauderdale Strikers, where he stayed until 1979. That season, he was forced to don a players uniform and play part of one game after a union strike decimated his team.

In July 1980, Newman became coach of the San Diego Sockers. While he had the best win/loss record as an outdoor soccer coach, and was named NASL coach of the year in 1971, 1977 and 1984, as well as ASL coach of the year in 1976, he also made his mark in indoor soccer with San Diego with whom he won 10 championships in 11 seasons in two different leagues (NASL and MISL), only losing a semi-final in 1986–1987 to the Tacoma Stars, bringing his career total to 13. Newman's innovations added new positions and tactics to the indoor game including the sixth attacker and super power play. He along with Eddie Firmani and Al Miller are the only coaches to win both outdoor and indoor NASL titles.

Newman became the first coach hired by MLS when he joined the Kansas City Wizards of Major League Soccer in 1995. The Wizards won the Western Division title in 1997. Newman retired 1999 with an all-time coaching record of 753–296–27. He was inducted into the National Soccer Hall of Fame in 1992. He was inducted into the Dallas Walk of Fame 2006. He was also inducted into the San Diego Hall of Champions, as well as the Atlanta Soccer Hall of Fame. Newman received the 'Key of the City' in Fort Lauderdale and twice in San Diego. The championship trophy of the Major Arena Soccer League was named the Ron Newman Cup when the present version of the San Diego Sockers honoured him on 7 January 2012.

Newman was the father of coach and retired player Guy Newman. Guy served as an assistant coach on his father's staff in both San Diego and Kansas City.
