= Ken Bracewell =

English footballer (born 1936)

Personal information
- Date of birth: 5 October 1936 (age 90)
- Place of birth: Colne, England
- Height: 5 ft 11 in (1.80 m)
- Position: Full-back

Senior career*
Years	Team	Apps	(Gls)
–1957	Trawden		
1957–1961	Burnley	0	(0)
1959–1961	Tranmere Rovers	28	(1)
1961–1962	Nelson		
1962–1963	Toronto Italia		
1963	Norwich City	0	(0)
1963–1965	Lincoln City	23	(1)
1965–1966	Margate	63	(8)
1966–1967	Bury	1	(0)
1967–1968	Toronto Falcons	47	(1)
1968–1969	Rochdale	5	(0)
1969–1972	Atlanta Chiefs	60	(1)
1973	Atlanta Apollos	12	(0)
1974	Denver Dynamos	3	(0)
Total		242	(12)

Managerial career
- 1973: Atlanta Apollos
- 1974: Denver Dynamos
- 1996: Colne
- * Club domestic league appearances and goals

Ken Bracewell (born 5 October 1936) is an English former professional football player and coach. Bracewell, who played as a full-back, made over 200 league appearances in England, Canada, and the United States.

== Playing career ==
Born in Colne, Lancashire, Bracewell began his career in non-league football with Trawden. He then signed with league club Burnley, but never made a league appearance, and so made his professional debut with Tranmere Rovers in 1959, making 28 league appearances in two seasons. Bracewell then played non-league football with Nelson, and with Canadian side Toronto Italia, before returning to English league football with Norwich City. However, he didn't make a single appearance for Norwich, and soon signed for Lincoln City, where he made 23 league appearances between 1963 and 1965. After leaving Lincoln, Bracewell played non-league football with Margate, before signing with Bury, where he made one league appearance. Bracewell then spent two seasons in Canada with the Toronto Falcons, and returned briefly to England to play with Rochdale. Bracewell then returned to the NASL to play with the Atlanta Chiefs, the Atlanta Apollos and the Denver Dynamos.

== Coaching career ==
During the 1973 and 1974 NASL seasons, Bracewell was player-coach of the Atlanta Apollos and the Denver Dynamos respectively. He was briefly caretaker manager of hometown club Colne in 1996.
