= Bobby Moffat =

English footballer (1945–2026)

Personal information
- Date of birth: 7 October 1945
- Place of birth: Portsmouth, England
- Date of death: 19 November 2026 (aged 81)
- Positions: Midfielder; defender

Senior career*
Years	Team	Apps	(Gls)
	Portsmouth	0	(0)
1965–1968	Gillingham	24	(1)
1968	Margate	30	(11)
1968–1970	Chelmsford City		
1970–1977	Dallas Tornado	123	(12)
1975	Dallas Tornado (indoor)		
1970–1971	→ Yeovil Town (loan)		
1971–1972	→ Weymouth (loan)		
1972–1973	→ Waterlooville (loan)		
- * Club domestic league appearances and goals

Bobby Moffat (7 October 1945 – 19 November 2026) was an English footballer who played eight seasons with the Dallas Tornado of the North American Soccer League.

== Career ==
Moffat began his career with Portsmouth before moving to Gillingham in 1965. He made only twenty-four appearances with the first team before moving to Margate in July 1968. In December 1968, Margate sold Moffat's contract to Chelmsford City for £800. In 1970, he moved to the Dallas Tornado of the North American Soccer League where he finished his career. However, he did return to England for three loan spells during the early 1970s. In 1983, he was the vice-president of the Dallas Americans of the American Soccer League.

Moffat continued to live in Dallas, after retiring as a player, and coached youth soccer.

== Death ==
Moffat died on 19 November 2026, aged 81.
