= John Cocking =

English footballer

Personal information
- Date of birth: 13 May 1944 (age 82)
- Place of birth: Sunderland, England
- Height: 5 ft 11 in (1.80 m)
- Position: Defender

Senior career*
Years	Team	Apps	(Gls)
- Gillingham
- Crook Town
- Alvechurch
- Enfield
1967–1973	Atlanta Chiefs	108	(5)
Total		108+	(5+)
- * Club domestic league appearances and goals

John Cocking (born 13 May 1944) is an English former professional footballer who played as a defender.

== Career ==
Born in Sunderland, Cocking spent his early career with Gillingham, Crook Town, Alvechurch and Enfield. At Crook he won the Northern League title in 1962–63.

Cocking then spent seven seasons in the National Professional Soccer League (NPSL) and North American Soccer League (NASL) for the Atlanta Chiefs between 1967 and 1973, making a total of 108 appearances - 4 in the NPSL and 104 in the NASL. With the Chiefs he won the NASL championship in 1968.

== Personal life ==
Cocking was married to Jane and the couple had sons.
