= Uriel da Veiga =

Brazilian footballer (born 1940)

Personal information
- Full name: Uriel Galdino da Veiga Fontoura
- Date of birth: August 28, 1940 (age 86)
- Place of birth: Niterói, Brazil
- Position: Defender

Senior career*
| Years | Team | Apps | (Gls) |
| 1967–1968 | Baltimore Bays | 31 | (4) |
| 1970–1972 | Atlanta Chiefs | 61 | (1) |
| 1973 | Atlanta Apollos | 15 | (1) |
- * Club domestic league appearances and goals

Uriel Da Veiga (born August 28, 1940) is a retired Brazilian football (soccer) player who played professionally in the North American Soccer League and National Professional Soccer League.

In 1967, Da Viega signed with the Baltimore Bays of the National Professional Soccer League. In 1969, the NPSL merged with the United Soccer Association to form the North American Soccer League. Da Viega and his teammates spent the 1968 season in the NASL. In 1970, he joined the Atlanta Chiefs and remained with the team through the 1973 season. That last season, the team was known as the Atlanta Apollos after the team was renamed by new ownership.
