= Phil Woosnam =

Welsh footballer and manager (1932–2019)

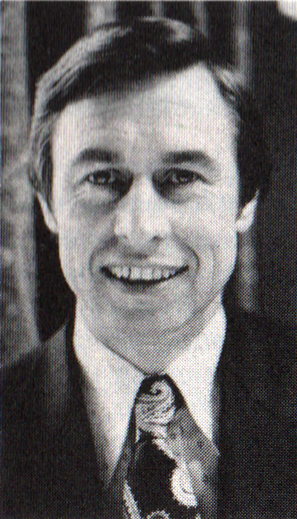
- Woosnam circa 1975

Personal information
- Full name: Phillip Abraham Woosnam
- Date of birth: 22 December 1932
- Place of birth: Caersws, Powys, Wales, UK
- Date of death: 19 July 2013 (aged 80)
- Place of death: Dunwoody, Georgia, US
- Position: Striker

Youth career
- Caersws
- Wrexham
- Welshpool
- Wolverhampton Wanderers
- Bangor University
- Peritus

Senior career*
Years	Team	Apps	(Gls)
1950-1951	Bangor City	5	
1952–1953	Aberystwyth Town	1	(0)
1952–1953	Manchester City	1	(0)
1953–1954	Portmadoc	1	(1)
1954	Oswestry Town		
1954-1955	Sutton United		
1954–1958	Leyton Orient	108	(19)
1958–1962	West Ham United	138	(26)
1962–1966	Aston Villa	106	(24)
1967–1968	Atlanta Chiefs	21	

International career
1952–1958	Wales Amateurs	16	(4)
1958–1963	Wales	17	(3)

Managerial career
- 1959: Oxford University
- 1961: West Ham United (caretaker)
- 1967–1968: Atlanta Chiefs
- 1968: United States
- * Club domestic league appearances and goals

Phillip Abraham Woosnam (22 December 1932 – 19 July 2013) was a Welsh association football inside-right and manager. A native of Caersws, Powys, Wales, Woosnam played for numerous clubs in Wales, England and one in the United States. He played international football for Wales. He was described as a "gifted inside-forward with a pronounced football intelligence".

He was commissioner of the North American Soccer League from 1969 to 1982, overseeing the league's expansion and boom years. He was inducted into the U.S. National Soccer Hall of Fame in 1997.

== Playing career ==
Woosnam played football with Montgomeryshire Schoolboys and gained youth international honours with Wales, and gained eight amateur caps, the first against England in 1951. While studying physics, he captained Bangor University's football team at the Welsh Universities' Championship and played for the Peritus club. Woosnam completed his national service with the Royal Artillery where he played for 55th RA Tonfanau and was selected for the Army XI several times, including alongside Eddie Colman and Duncan Edwards of Manchester United.

Retaining his amateur status throughout, Woosnam played club football for Welshpool, Oswestry Town, Bangor City, Wrexham, Wolverhampton Wanderers, Manchester City, Caersws, Aberystwyth Town, Portmadoc, Sutton United, as well as guesting occasionally for Middlesex Wanderers, before he joined Leyton Orient. His only Manchester City appearance was in a 6-0 defeat versus Cardiff City at Ninian Park. He made his senior international debut for Wales against Scotland in October 1958, having turned professional in January 1957. He represented the London XI against Lausanne Sports while at Brisbane Road. He was named amateur footballer of the year in 1955.

In November 1958, Woosnam was signed by West Ham United for £30,000 and left his job as a physics teacher at Leyton County High School for Boys to turn professional. West Ham insisted that they would only sign Wooosnam if he gave up full-time teaching. A condition of his release from teaching to turn professional with the Hammers was that the Upton Park club would send its first team to face the school's first XI. Such a fixture became a regular annual occurrence at Leyton County with West Ham visiting again - once with Woosnam as Hammers' captain - as well as Charlton Athletic, Leyton Orient and Crystal Palace. While at Leyton County Woosnam would recommend promising schoolboys to Leyton Orient. He made his debut against Arsenal that month and went on to make 138 league appearances for the club, scoring 26 goals. He made 15 cup appearances, scoring three goals. While at Upton Park, he added 14 full international caps to the one he had gained while at Orient. He also represented the Football League and the Wales national amateur football team, for whom he won 16 caps, scoring four goals, only one less than the national amateur record. His caps total places him joint 7th in the all-time amateur appearance list.

Woosnam moved to Aston Villa in 1962 for a £25,000 fee. He made his Villa debut on 1 December 1962 in a 5–0 home win against Bolton Wanderers. He went on to score 24 goals in 106 League games, and gained a further two international caps.

== Coaching career ==
Woosnam qualified as a full FA coach in 1960 and his first official coaching role was to help prepare Oxford University in the run-up to the annual Varsity match against Cambridge.

Woosnam acted as caretaker manager at West Ham after Ted Fenton's reign came to an end in 1961. Woosnam was only 29 years old and had designs on the job before Ron Greenwood was appointed. Greenwood soon saw Woosnam and some other senior players as a threat to his authority, which in part prompted Woosnam's transfer to Aston Villa.

Woosnam immigrated to the United States in 1966 when he was appointed player-coach for the Atlanta Chiefs and scored the first goal in the first football game in the Atlanta Fulton County Stadium. Woosnam was named 'Coach of the Year' in 1968. In 1968, with qualifiers for the 1970 FIFA World Cup about to start, Woosnam accepted an invitation to coach the United States national team. It would be the USMNT's first full internationals in three and half years. He was in post for only two months in which the team played nine internationals, including a three match tour of Haiti. Under Woosnam, the team won four games, lost four and drew one. It was during this period that Coventry City's proud Scot Gerry Baker was persuaded to turn out for the US where he had been born 30 years earlier.

When Woosnam stepped down to become commissioner of the NASL, he was succeeded by his assistant, Englishman Gordon Jago. Ultimately, the team failed to qualify for the 1970 World Cup.

== NASL commissioner ==
Woosnam was commissioner of the NASL from 1969 to 1982. He is credited as an important factor in the development of the NASL, and was a major figure in promoting the league and had secured TV contracts from CBS and ABC. He played a key role during 1970 in recruiting executives at Warner Communications to invest in an expansion team—the New York Cosmos. Woosnam oversaw the westward expansion of NASL in the early 1970s, establishing teams in Los Angeles, the Bay Area, Seattle, and Vancouver. However, he also guided the league into several poor business decisions, such as over-expansion to 24 teams. Facing mounting financial losses, the owners voted to fire Woosnam in 1982.

Woosnam later became managing director of the marketing arm of US Soccer, and helped bring the 1994 World Cup to the US. He was inducted into the US National Soccer Hall of Fame and the Georgia Soccer Hall of Fame in 1997.

Woosnam was also in charge of venues during the 1996 Olympic Games hosted in his adopted city of Atlanta.

In 2003, the Wales national football team travelled to San Jose, California for an end of season friendly international against the USA. The Football Association of Wales invited Woosnam to be its guest for the week the squad was in California preparing for the game.

== Personal ==
Woosnam, a cousin to golfer Ian Woosnam and a nephew of the English footballer, Max Woosnam, became a naturalized American citizen.

== Death ==
Phil Woosnam died on 19 July 2013 in Dunwoody, Georgia from complications related to prostate cancer and Alzheimer's disease, at the age of 80.
