= Hillcrest High School (Dallas) =

School in Dallas, Texas, United States

Location
- 9924 Hillcrest Road; Dallas, Texas 75230; United States; 32°52′59″N 96°47′06″W

Information
- Former name: Vickery Meadows High School
- Type: Public, Secondary
- Motto: Achieving Excellence Together
- Founded: 1938; 88 years ago
- School district: DISD
- Principal: Terrence Florie
- Staff: 105.83 (FTE)
- Grades: 9–12
- Enrollment: 1,595 (2023-2024)
- Student to teacher ratio: 15.07
- Colors: Red; Black; White
- Athletics conference: UIL
- Sports: Baseball • Basketball • Cross Country • Football • Golf • Soccer • Softball • Swimming and Diving • Tennis • Track and Field • Volleyball • Wrestling
- Mascot: Panther
- Accreditation: TEA: Met Standard
- Feeder schools: Benjamin Franklin Middle; Anne Frank Elementary; Arthur Kramer Elementary; John J. Pershing Elementary; Preston Hollow Elementary; Dan D. Rogers Elementary
- Website: www.dallasisd.org/hillcrest
- Last updated: May 1, 2019; 7 years ago

Hillcrest High School, formerly Vickery Meadows High School is a public secondary school located in North Dallas, Texas (USA). Hillcrest High School enrolls students in grades 9–12 and is a part of the Dallas Independent School District. In 2018, the school was rated "Met Standard" by the Texas Education Agency.

== History ==
The school opened in 1938 as Vickery Meadows High School. In 1945 it was renamed to Hillcrest High School.

Prior to the 1970s Hillcrest was known as "Hebrew High" due to the number of Jewish students enrolled.

== Campus ==
The John McClamrock Stadium (previously Franklin Stadium), named after John McClamrock, is located at Hillcrest. In June 2011 the DISD board voted against renaming the stadium after McClamrock, but in 2025 the board voted for doing so.

In fall 2019 a new addition with 22 classrooms, an administrative area, a 7,500-square-foot (700 m^{2}) competition gymnasium, a locker room, and a tornado shelter, along with renovations, are to be completed.

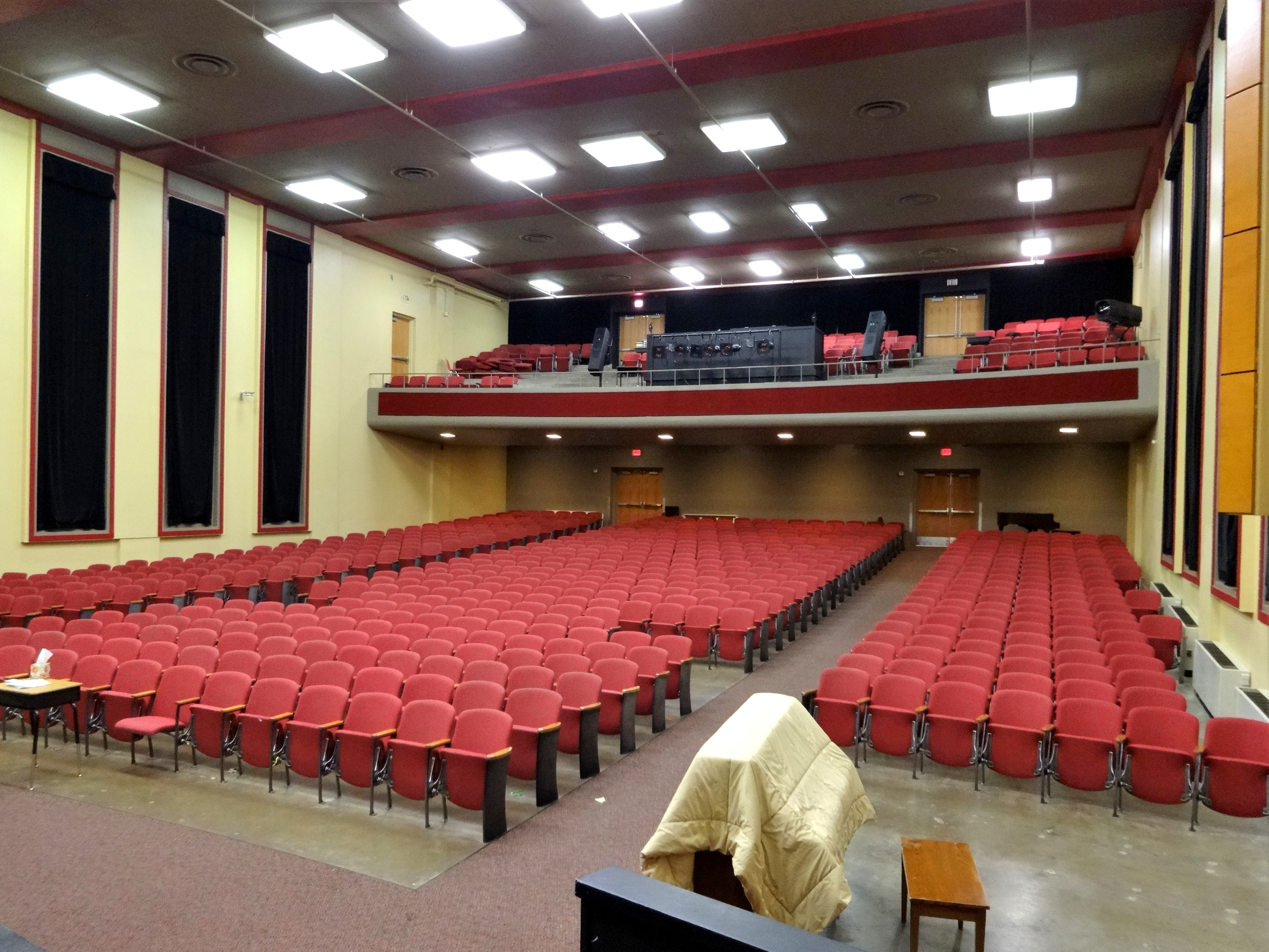
Hillcrest High School auditorium

== Neighborhoods served ==
Several Dallas communities such as portions of Preston Hollow (including a portion of Old Preston Hollow, Preston Hollow North, and Preston Hollow West), University Meadows, a small portion of Vickery Meadow, and a portion of Addison are zoned to Hillcrest.

== Notable alumni ==
- Colin Allred (2001) former NFL football player, United States House of Representatives member-elect, and 2024 Democratic nominee for the United States Senate.
- John D. Arnold (1992) Commodities trader.
- Rickey Bolden (1980) Former NFL Football player - Cleveland Browns 1984 - 1990
- Vikki Goodwin (1985) Texas House of Representatives member and Lieutenant Governor-elect of Texas
- J. William Harbour M.D. is an ocular oncologist, cancer researcher, and Chair of Ophthalmology at the University of Texas Southwestern Medical Center in Dallas.
- Lane P. Hughston (1969) Mathematician.
- Daniss Jenkins (2019) Basketball player
- Linda Koop (1968) former Texas House of Representatives member
- John McClamrock (1975) American football player gravely injured during a game.
- Harriet Miers (1963) former White House Counsel.
- Glenn Morshower (1977) actor, best known for playing Secret Service Agent Aaron Pierce in 24.
- Greg Pak comic book artist
- Erric Pegram former NFL football player.
- Damien Robinson (1992) Former NFL football player.
- Ajai Sanders (1985) actress and stand-up comic.
- Eugene Spates (2005) basketball player
- Jefferson Stein (2007) film director
- Kurt Thomas (1990) former NBA player.
