= Atlanta Chiefs =

American professional soccer team based in Atlanta, Georgia

- Atlanta Chiefs logo, 1980–1981
- Full name: Atlanta Chiefs (1967–1972, 1979–1981); Atlanta Apollos (1973)
- Founded: 1967 (original team); 1979 (reformed team)
- Dissolved: 1973 (original team); 1981 (reformed team)
- Stadium: Atlanta–Fulton County Stadium (outdoor) (1967–1969, 1971–1972, 1979–1981); Tara Stadium (outdoor) (1970); Grant Field (outdoor) (1973); Omni Coliseum (indoor) (1979–1981)
- Capacity: 51,383 (Atlanta Stadium); 10,000 (Tara Stadium); 58,121 (Grant Field); 15,155 (Omni Coliseum)
- Owners: Atlanta Braves, Inc (1967–73), Atlanta Hawks, Inc (1973), Ted Turner & Dick Cecil (1979–81)
- League: NPSL (1967); NASL (1968–1973, 1979–1981)
Home colors	Away colors

The Atlanta Chiefs were an American professional soccer team based in Atlanta, Georgia. The team competed in the National Professional Soccer League (NPSL) in 1967 and the North American Soccer League (NASL) from 1968 to 1973 and again from 1979 to 1981. For the 1973 season, the team played as the Atlanta Apollos.

Founded in 1967 as a charter member of the NPSL, the club was the brainchild of Dick Cecil, then Vice President of the Atlanta Braves baseball franchise who was the Chiefs' owner. Cecil was intrigued by the 1966 FIFA World Cup in England and decided that a professional soccer team would add valuable events for Atlanta Stadium. From 1967 to 1972, the stadium would serve as the Chiefs' home field for all seasons except 1970, when the Chiefs played their home games at Tara Stadium.

In 1973, the team was sold and rebranded as the Atlanta Apollos. They played their home games at Grant Field before folding at the end of the 1973 season. The Chiefs' brand would later be revived by Cecil and Ted Turner in 1979 after the Colorado Caribous of the NASL relocated to Atlanta. The Chiefs again played at Atlanta—Fulton County Stadium, as well as the Omni Coliseum for two seasons of indoor soccer before the franchise again folded in 1981.

Kaizer Chiefs F.C., a professional soccer team that plays in the South African Premier Soccer League, was founded by Kaizer Motaung, who played for the Atlanta Chiefs in their initial incarnation. The Kaizer Chiefs' name and logo were inspired by those of the Atlanta club.

== History ==
=== Formation and NPSL (1966–1967) ===
The idea for a professional soccer team in Atlanta was first posed by Dick Cecil in 1966, who at the time was the Vice President of the Atlanta Braves, a member club of Major League Baseball (MLB). While Cecil had never before seen a soccer match, he became intrigued by the sport after reading accounts of the 1966 FIFA World Cup and became convinced that soccer games could be a profitable draw for the recently built Atlanta Stadium, which also served as the Braves' home stadium. The Chiefs were one of several professional sports teams to begin play in Atlanta during the late 1960s, which also included the Braves (MLB, 1966), the Atlanta Falcons (NFL, 1966), and the Atlanta Hawks (NBA, 1968).

In 1966, under Cecil's direction, the Atlanta Braves chartered a franchise in the newly created National Professional Soccer League. The team name was chosen based on its association with the Braves, which like the Chiefs also used Native American imagery in their branding. On September 8, Cecil made one of the first hires on the team with Phil Woosnam as head coach and player. Team tryouts were held on the campus of Emory University, which also housed the Chiefs' training facility.

The initial roster included notable international players such as Vic Crowe, Peter McParland, and Vic Rouse. The Chiefs opened their first season with an away game against the Baltimore Bays on April 16, 1967. The game, a 1–0 loss for the Chiefs, is notable for being the first professional soccer match to be televised in the United States. Before the game, the players on both teams were introduced holding flags of the countries they were from, and a band played "Dixie" before kick-off. The Chiefs would finish their debut season with a win–loss–tie record of 10–9–12. Following the 1967 season, the NPSL merged with the United Soccer Association to form the North American Soccer League.

=== Exhibition matches with Manchester City (1968) ===
In 1968, the Chiefs hosted two exhibition matches against Manchester City F.C. of the Football League First Division, which at the time was the top tier in the English football league system. In the first game, held May 28, the Chiefs upset City 3–2. Shortly after the defeat, assistant manager of Manchester City Malcolm Allison said of the Atlanta team, "They couldn't play in the fourth division in England." Following the loss, Manchester City requested a rematch, which was held June 15 and saw the Chiefs again beat the visiting team, this time 2–1.

Addressing the upset status of these two games, Atlanta Chiefs captain Ray Bloomfield, an Englishman, said, "It would be like some of your boys coming over here to play American football and then beating the team that won the Super Bowl." That same season, the Chiefs would host Santos FC in an August 28 match, losing to the Brazilian team 6–2 in front of over 25,000 attendees, which was at the time the largest crowd for a soccer game in Atlanta. Notably, Pelé played in the game for several years before he would join the New York Cosmos of the NASL in 1975.

=== NASL Final (1968) ===
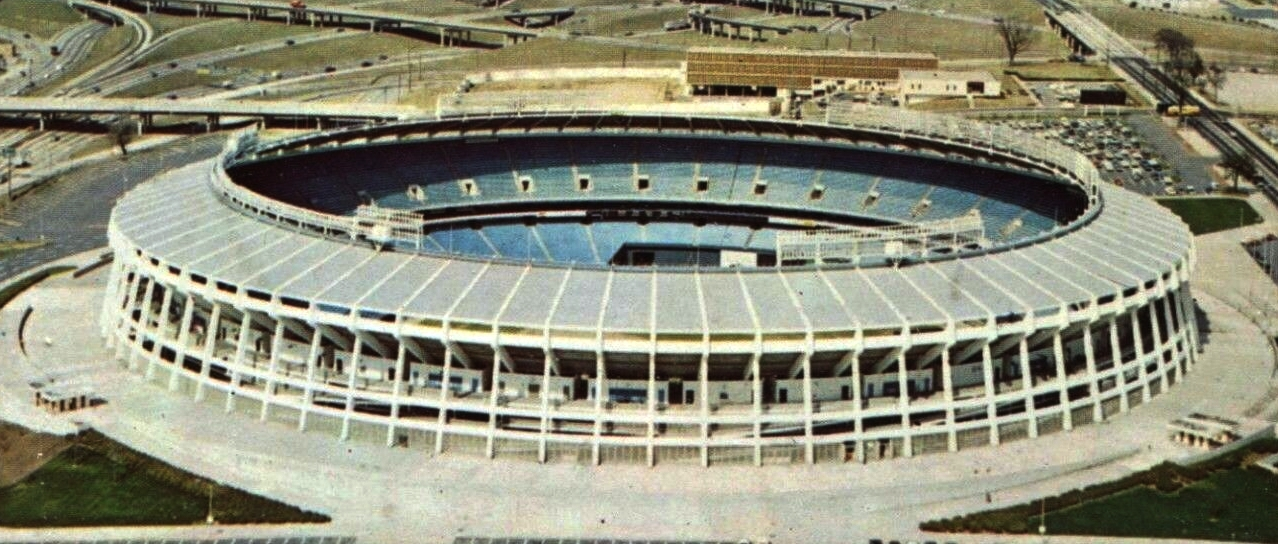
Atlanta Stadium, the Chiefs' first home venue

The Chiefs capped off the 1968 season by defeating the San Diego Toros in the NASL Final 1968 at Atlanta Stadium in front of approximately 15,000 spectators. In doing so, they became both the first champions of the NASL as well as the first major professional sports franchise in Atlanta to win a championship. Atlanta would not host another championship-winning major professional sports team until the Atlanta Braves won the 1995 World Series, and the city would not see another championship soccer team until Atlanta United FC won the MLS Cup 2018. Following the championship, state representative Elliott H. Levitas issued a congratulatory proclamation from the Georgia General Assembly, and players on the team were given championship rings by Braves owners, which is fairly common in North American sports, but was uncommon in soccer.

Following the 1968 season, Woosnam left the team to become the commissioner of the NASL. He was succeeded as team manager by Rouse.

=== Later years and revival (1969–1981) ===
Following the 1968 season, the NASL experienced a period of sharp decline. Between the 1968 and 1969 seasons, 12 of the 17 teams of the NASL had folded, and the television contract the league had with CBS had expired. With only five teams remaining in the league, the 1969 season was split into two halves. The first half, called the International Cup, was a double round-robin tournament in which the remaining NASL clubs were represented by teams imported from the United Kingdom. The Chiefs were represented by Aston Villa F.C. The team tied for third in the Cup with a 2–4–2 record. For the second half of the 1969 season, the teams returned to their normal rosters and played a 16-game schedule with no playoffs. The Chiefs, with an 11–2–3 record, were declared runners-up to the Kansas City Spurs in the NASL Final 1969 who, despite having a worse record than the Chiefs, narrowly edged out the Atlanta team in points that season.

After the 1969 season, the high cost of operation at Atlanta Stadium led the team to seek a new home venue. Initially, DeKalb Memorial Stadium was selected as the home venue, but after negotiations fell through, Tara Stadium in nearby Clayton County was selected and would serve as the Chiefs' home venue for the 1970 season. The Chiefs would return to Atlanta Stadium for the subsequent season. Also in 1970, Sonny Carter became the first American-born player to sign with the team, having previously played the sport for Emory's collegiate team. The 1971 season saw the Chiefs win their division and advance to the NASL Final 1971, where they lost to the Dallas Tornado.

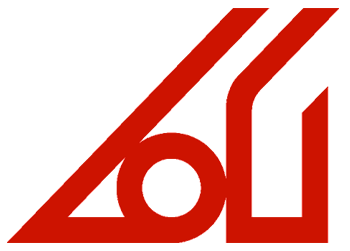
Atlanta Apollos logo

After the 1972 season, the Chiefs folded, as the team owners returned the franchise to the league. Prior to the 1973 season, OmniGroup, owners of the Hawks and Flames, secured a franchise, naming it the Atlanta Apollos, and played their home games at Grant Field on the campus of the Georgia Institute of Technology for the 1973 season. The Apollos experienced their worst season in franchise history in 1973, posting a 3–7–9 record just two seasons removed from playing for the championship. Following the 1973 season, the franchise folded.

The Chiefs brand would remain dormant for several years until the name and logo (altered slightly) were revived in 1979 when the Colorado Caribous franchise moved to Atlanta, with Cecil and Ted Turner as owners. Turner had purchased the Caribous franchise for $1.5 million and relocated them following a conversation he had with Cecil about the sport. This new franchise included notable players such as Victor Nogueira, Adrian Brooks, Mark MacKain, Carl Strong, Webster Lichaba, Jomo Sono, and Louis and George Nanchoff.

After the 1979 season, David Chadwick was hired away from the Fort Lauderdale Strikers to serve as team manager. Keith Furphy was also traded to the Chiefs from the Detroit Express before the 1980 season. After an abysmal 7–25 season in 1980, Chadwick brought Brian Kidd to the team on a loan from Bolton Wanderers F.C. While the team's prospect improved during the 1981 season, including increased attendance and a division championship, a lack of profitability led Turner to pull the plug on the team after that season. For these three seasons the team once again played at Atlanta Stadium (by this time renamed Atlanta–Fulton County Stadium), while also playing at Omni Coliseum for two NASL Indoor seasons.

=== Legacy ===
"If we are to be a success in this country, we must sell the game to the public."

— Phil Woosnam, speaking to United Press International about soccer in the United States

One of the biggest legacies of the Chiefs was introducing the game of soccer to the people of Atlanta and the surrounding region. According to a 1968 report by the Chiefs, at the time of the team's arrival in Atlanta, fewer than 150 people in the city were playing organized soccer, a number which had grown to about 16,000 by mid-1968. Furthermore, the Chiefs are purported to have held over 390 soccer clinics throughout the state during their existence. These extensive outreach efforts, primarily led by Woosnam, also lead to the creation of the Atlanta District Amateur Soccer League and the soccer program at Georgia State University.

Kaizer Chiefs F.C. of the South African Premier Soccer League was founded in 1970 by Kaizer Motaung, who had played for the Atlanta Chiefs in the 1968 and 1969 seasons. Motaung based the name and logo of the team on that of the Atlanta franchise. Addressing this, Motaung stated that, "We wanted to model ourselves against what my experiences were in Atlanta."

Like the Chiefs, Atlanta United FC would play at Grant Field at Bobby Dodd Stadium when it kicked off MLS play in 2017 before moving into Mercedes Benz Stadium later that season.

== Year-by-year ==
=== Outdoors ===
Year	Record	Regular-season finish	Playoffs	Avg. Attend.
1967	10–9–12	4th, Eastern Division, (NPSL)	Did not qualify	6,961
1968	18–6–7	1st, Atlantic Division	NASL Champions	5,794
1969	11–2–3	2nd	no postseason	3,371
1970	11–5–8	2nd, Southern Division	Did not qualify	3,002
1971	12–5–7	1st, Southern Division	Runners-up	4,275
1972	5–3–6	3rd, Southern Division	Did not qualify	5,034
1973	3–7–9	3rd, Southern Division	Did not qualify	3,317
1979	12–18	4th, Central Division, National Conference	Did not qualify	7,350
1980	7–25	4th, Central Division, National Conference	Did not qualify	4,884
1981	17–15	1st, Southern Division	First Round	6,189

=== Indoors ===
Year	Record	Regular-season finish	Playoffs	Avg. attendance
1979–80	10–2	1st, Eastern Division	Division Finals	5,069
1980–81	13–5	1st, Eastern Division	Semifinals	9,611

== Honors ==
NASL championships (1)
- 1968
- 1969, 1971 runners-up

NASL regular-season premierships (1)

- 1979–80 indoor
- 1969, 1970, 1971 runners-up

Division titles (5)

- 1968 Atlantic Division
- 1971 Southern Division
- 1979–80 Eastern Division indoor
- 1980–81 Eastern Division indoor
- 1981 Southern Division

Coach of the Year

- 1968 Phil Woosnam

Rookie of the Year

- 1968 Kaizer Motaung

League goal scoring champion

- 1969 Kaizer Motaung (16)
- 1979–80 David Byrne (23) indoor

League scoring champion

- 1969 Kaizer Motaung (16 goals, 4 assists, 36 points)
- 1979–80 David Byrne (23 goals, 11 assists, 57 points) indoor

All-Star first team selections

- 1967 Emment Kapengwe
- 1969 Emment Kapengwe, Kaizer Motaung
- 1970 Uriel Da Veiga, Dave Metchick, Art Welch
- 1971 Kaizer Motaung
- 1972 Paul Child
- 1981 Brian Kidd

All-Star second team selections

- 1968 John Cocking, Vic Rouse
- 1970 Ray Bloomfield, John Cocking, Delroy Scott
- 1971 John Cocking, Uriel Da Veiga
- 1972 Art Welch

All-Star honorable mentions

- 1971 Mick Hoban, Manfred Kammerer, Barrie Lynch, Freddie Mwila
- 1972 John Cocking, Mick Hoban
- 1973 Paul Child

Indoor All-Stars

- 1980–81 Keith Furphy

U.S. Soccer Hall of Fame

- 1992 Ron Newman
- 1997 Phil Woosnam
- 2003 Paul Child

Indoor Soccer Hall of Fame

- 2012 Ron Newman, Victor Nogueira
- 2014 Slobo Ilijevski, Bruce Savage

== Head coaches ==
- Phil Woosnam 1967 – 1968
- Vic Rouse 1969 – 1972
- Ken Bracewell 1973
- Dan Wood 1979 – 1980
- David Chadwick 1980 – 1981
