= Dallas Tornado =

- Full name: Dallas Tornado
- Nickname: The Tornado
- Founded: 1967; 59 years ago
- Dissolved: 1981; 45 years ago
- Stadium: List: Cotton Bowl Capacity: 70,000 Turnpike Stadium Capacity: 20,000 P.C. Cobb Stadium Capacity: 22,000 Franklin Field Capacity: 8,500 Texas Stadium Capacity: 65,000 Ownby Stadium Capacity: 20,000 Indoor soccer: Fair Park Coliseum Capacity: 7,513 (1975) Reunion Arena Capacity: 16,626 (1980–81)
- Chairman: Lamar Hunt
- League: USA (1967); NASL (1968–1981)
Home colors	Away colors

The Dallas Tornado was a soccer team based in Dallas, Texas that played in the North American Soccer League (NASL) from 1968 to 1981.

The club's home fields were Cotton Bowl (1967–1968), P.C. Cobb Stadium (1969), Franklin Field (1970–1971), Texas Stadium (1972–1975, 1980–1981) and Ownby Stadium on the SMU campus (1976–1979). The club played Indoor soccer at Reunion Arena for one season (1980–81), and hosted the two-day 1975 Regionals at Fair Park Coliseum.

== History ==
=== 1967–1971 ===
The franchise was one of the original clubs that played in the United Soccer Association (USA), one of the two precursors to the NASL, in 1967. That year overseas clubs played in U.S. cities as American teams. The team that played as the Dallas Tornado were Dundee United of the Scottish Football League. Of the twelve teams that comprised the USA in 1967, the Tornado franchise played the longest, 15 seasons.

The following season when the USA merged with the NPSL, owners Lamar Hunt and Bill McNutt had to build a new team from scratch. They hired Bob Kap, a Serbian born soccer coach who had escaped with his family during the 1956 Hungarian Revolution. Kap had studied with Ferenc Puskás at the Soccer Academy in Hungary. Kap was recruited from Toronto, Canada, where he had relocated after the 1956 Revolution. During the first 6 months as coach, Kap traveled throughout Europe to form the new Dallas Tornado, hiring young players from England to Turkey.

The fledgling Dallas Tornado learned to play as a team on their world tour during seven months in 1967–68, where they played 45 games in 26 countries spanning five continents. Their world tour took them from England to India, from Indonesia to Vietnam during the height of the war. The Tornado consisted of 8 players from England, 5 from Norway, 2 each from Sweden and the Netherlands; there was only one American player, Jay Moore. The Tornado played in front of crowds of up to 50,000, and they played several well-established teams, such as a 2–2 draw against Fenerbahçe, as well as playing Spanish second-division side Real Oviedo, and the Japan national team. The tour gave the new Dallas Tornado team an international face at a time when American soccer was relatively unknown; the effort resulted in a record of 10 wins, nine draws and 26 defeats. When the actual 1968 NASL season started, though, the exhausted Tornado quickly blew itself out; they won just two league matches all year, against four ties and 26 losses, easily the worst record in NASL history.

Things turned dark after the season when no fewer than ten NASL franchises folded, with Dallas one of the surviving five clubs. The 1969 season was split into two halves. The first half was called the International Cup, a double round robin tournament in which the remaining NASL clubs were represented by teams imported from the United Kingdom. The Tornado was represented again by Dundee United. The Tornado came in tied for third in the Cup with a 2–4–2 record. For the second half of the 1969 season, the teams returned to their normal rosters and played a 16-game schedule with no playoffs.

Fortunes improved for the club as they won the NASL championship in 1971, defeating the Atlanta Chiefs 2–0 in the final game of a three-game series, Mike Renshaw scoring the winning goal. The road to that title was marathon that, barring a rule change, might never be duplicated. In Game 1 of the best-of-three semifinal against the Rochester Lancers, league scoring champion Carlos Metidieri mercifully ended the match 2–1, late in the 6th 15 minute-overtime period in the 176th minute, less than four minutes shy of playing two complete games in one day. Three days later Dallas evened the series at one game each with a 3–1 regulation win. In the rubber match four days later, the two teams ended regulation tied again at 1 goal apiece. The game reached 4OTs before Bobby Moffat sent Dallas into the Finals in the 148 minute. Four days after that, Dallas lost Game 1 of the NASL Championship Series, 2–1 in the 3OTs to Atlanta after 123 minutes. All totaled, Dallas had played 537 minutes of football (3 minutes short of six games) in 13 days time. Finally the Tornado were able to get control of the series pulling away in games 2 and 3 by scores of 4–1 and 2–0 respectively.

=== 1972–1981 ===
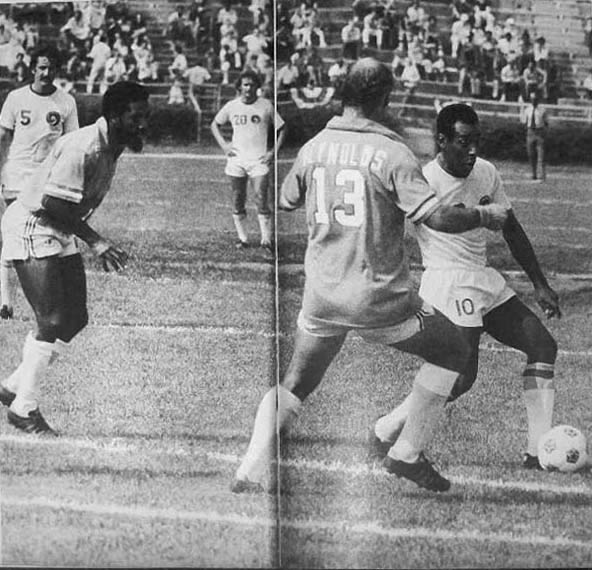
Pelé's carrying the ball during the Tornado vs. New York Cosmos match on June 15, 1975

Several division titles followed in the years after that league title. The face of the team was Kyle Rote, Jr., son of former New York Giants wide receiver and TV broadcaster Kyle Rote. In 1973, Rote Jr. led the league in scoring and won the league Rookie of the Year award. Rote Jr. further boosted his public profile by winning ABC Sports Superstars competition in 1974, 1976, and 1977. On June 15, 1975, the Tornado played the New York Cosmos in Pelé's NASL debut, a match broadcast nationally on CBS. Steve Pecher won the league Rookie of the Year award in 1976. The Tornado sold Rote Jr. at the end of the 1978 season to the Houston Hurricane for $250,000.

As was the case with most NASL clubs, a drop in attendance contributed to the demise of the club in 1981. The Dallas Morning News estimated Hunt and McNutt's cumulative financial loss over 15 years at a minimum of $20 million. After the 1981 season Hunt and McNutt decided to merge their team with the Tampa Bay Rowdies franchise, while retaining a minority stake in the Florida club.

Lamar Hunt did not give up on soccer in America, however, and was one of the founding owners in Major League Soccer.

Ex-Manchester United goalkeeper, Alex Stepney played for Dallas.

== Year-by-year ==
Year	Record	Regular season finish	Playoffs	Avg. Attend
1967	3–6–3	6th, Western Division (USA)	Did not qualify	9,227
1968	2–26–4	4th, Gulf Division	Did not qualify	2,927
1969	2–2–4	3rd	No Postseason	2,923
1970	8–12–4	3rd, Southern Division	Did not qualify	2,228
1971	10–6–8	2nd, Southern Division	Won Semifinals Series vs. Rochester Lancers, 2–1; Won NASL Finals Series vs. Atlanta Chiefs, 2–1	3,326
1972	6–5–3	2nd, Southern Division	Lost Semifinal Game vs. New York Cosmos, 0–1	4,093
1973	11–4–4	1st, Southern Division	Won Semifinal Game vs. New York Cosmos, 1–0; Lost NASL Championship Game vs. Philadelphia Atoms, 0–2	7,474
1974	9–8–3	1st, Central Division	Won Quarterfinal Game vs. San Jose Earthquakes, 3–0; Lost Semifinal Game vs. Miami Toros, 1–3	8,469
1975	9–13	4th, Central Division	Did not qualify	4,630
1976	13–11	2nd, Southern Division, Pacific Conference	Won 1st round Game vs. Los Angeles Aztecs, 2–0; Lost Division Championship vs. San Jose Earthquakes, 0–2	14,095
1977	18–8	1st, Southern Division, Pacific Conference	Lost Conference Championships vs. Los Angeles Aztecs, 0–2	16,511
1978	14–16	3rd, Central Division, National Conference	Did not qualify	8,981
1979	17–13	2nd, Central Division, National Conference	Lost National Conference Quarterfinals vs. Vancouver Whitecaps, 0–2	9,321
1980	18–14	1st, Central Division, National Conference	Won 1st round Series vs. Minnesota Kicks, 2–0; Lost National Conference Semifinals vs. New York Cosmos, 1–2	6,752
1981	5–27	4th, Central Division	Did not qualify	4,670

== Indoor seasons ==
In March 1971 the league staged its first ever indoor event, a four-team Hoc-Soc tournament at the St. Louis Arena. Dallas won both of its matches, 2–1 and 3–0, and the title. In the winter of 1975, the NASL organized a two-tiered, 16 team indoor tournament with four regional winners meeting in a "final-four" style championship. Dallas hosted their region at the Fair Park Coliseum and won the group. Though they lost in the semi-final, the Tornado rebounded to win the 3rd place game 2–0 over New York at the Cow Palace. In 1976 they again advanced out of their group, this time as a wild card, but lost both the semi-final and the third-place match at the Bayfront Center. In January 1979 the Tornado joined the Tulsa Roughnecks, Ft. Lauderdale Strikers and host Tampa Bay Rowdies for the two-day Budweiser Invitational. They won both games, and the mini-tournament itself on goal differential. Tornado forward Jimmy Ryan was the leading scorer of the invitational with 7 goals. Dallas participated in only one full NASL indoor season, 1980–81, before folding.

Year	Record	Regular season finish	Playoffs
1971	2–0	Hoc-Soc Tournament	1st place
1975	2–2	(16 team tournament only)	3rd place
1976	2–2	(12 team tournament only)	4th place
1978	1–1	Schlitz Tournament	1st place
1979	2–0	Budweiser Invitational	1st place
1980–81	7–11	3rd, Southern Division	Did not qualify

== Honors ==
NASL championships (1)
- 1971
- 1973 (runner up)

NASL Season Premierships (1)

- 1973

NASL Indoor championships (3)

- 1971
- 1978
- 1979

Division/Region Titles (5)

- 1973 Southern Division
- 1974 Central Division
- 1975 Region 1 (indoor)
- 1977 Southern Division, Pacific Conference
- 1980 Central Division, National Conference

Rookie of the Year

- 1973 Kyle Rote, Jr.
- 1976 Steve Pecher

League scoring champion

- 1970 Kirk Apostolidis (16 goals, 3 assists, 35 points)
- 1973 Kyle Rote, Jr. (10 goals, 10 assists, 30 points)

League goal scoring champion

- 1970 Kirk Apostolidis (16 goals)
- 1973 Ilija Mitic (12 goals)

League Leading Goaltender

- 1971 Mirko Stojanovic (GAA: 0.79)
- 1972 Ken Cooper (GAA: 0.86)
- 1977 Ken Cooper (GAA: 0.90)

Indoor MVP

- 1971 Mike Renshaw

Indoor Scoring Champion

- 1971 Mike Renshaw (2 goals, 1 assist)
- 1978 Kai Haaskivi (6 goals)
- 1979 Jimmy Ryan (7 goals)
Indoor Leading Goaltender
- 1971 Ken Cooper (GAA: 0.50)

All-Star first team selections

- 1969 Kirk Apostolidis, John Best, Ilija Mitic
- 1970 John Best
- 1971 John Best, Dick Hall, Mirko Stojanovic
- 1972 John Best, Ken Cooper
- 1973 John Best, Ken Cooper, Ilija Mitic
- 1974 Dick Hall, Albert Jackson, Ilija Mitic

All-Star second team selections

- 1967 (USA) Doug Smith
- 1970 Kirk Apostolidis, Mike Renshaw, Roy Turner
- 1972 Dick Hall
- 1973 Dick Hall, Rick Reynolds
- 1975 Ken Cooper
- 1976 Jeff Bourne, Bob Hope, George Ley
- 1977 George Ley, Steve Pecher

All-Star honorable mentions

- 1971 Gabbo Gavric, Oreco
- 1972 Mike Renshaw
- 1973 John Collins, Nicky Jennings, Kyle Rote, Jr., Roy Turner

Indoor All-Stars

- 1971 Jim Benedek, Mike Renshaw
- 1975 Ilija Mitic, Mike Renshaw, Ken Cooper

U.S. Soccer Hall of Fame

- 1982 Lamar Hunt
- 1992 Ron Newman
- 1995 Al Miller
- 2009 Kyle Rote, Jr.
- 2015 Glenn Myernick

Indoor Soccer Hall of Fame

- 2012 Kenny Cooper, Sr., Ron Newman
- 2013 Kai Haaskivi, Mike Stankovic
- 2019 Roy Turner

== Notable players ==
- (Greece) Koulis Apostolidis (1969–1971)
- (United States) Jim Benedek (1970–1973)
- (England) Jeff Bourne (1978–1979)
- (England) Cliff Calvert (1981)
- (England) Len Cantello (1981)
- (England) Dave Chadwick (1974–1975)
- (England) Alan Hinton (1977)
- (Scotland) Bobby Hope (1976–1978)
- (Northern Ireland) Bill Irwin (1981)
- (England) Nicky Jennings (1973)
- (England) Brian Kettle (1978)
- (England) Kevin Kewley (1976–1979)
- (Netherlands) Willi Lippens (1979)
- (Brazil) Oreco (1970–1971)
- (Germany) Wolfgang Rausch (1979–1981)
- (United States) Kyle Rote Jr. (1972–1978)
- (Scotland) Jimmy Ryan (1976–1979)
- (England) Alex Stepney (1979–1980)
- (Germany) Klaus Toppmöller (1980–1981)
- (Germany) Gert Trinklein (1979–80)
- (Brazil) Zequinha (1979–1981)
- (Malta) Charlie Williams (1968)
- (Scotland) Walter Smith (On Loan 1967)

== Head coaches ==
- Jerry Kerr 1967
- Bob Kap 1967
- Keith Spurgeon 1968
- Ron Newman 1969–1975
- Al Miller 1976–1980
- Mike Renshaw 1981
- Peter Short 1981
