= 1974 Miami Toros season =

Miami Toros
1974 season
- Manager: John Young
- Stadium: Miami Orange Bowl
- NASL: Eastern Division: First place NASL Championship:Finalist
- Top goalscorer: League: (Trinidad and Tobago) Steve David (13 goals); All: (Trinidad and Tobago) Steve David (13 goals)
- Average home league attendance: 7,340
Home colors	Away colors

The 1974 Miami Toros season was the second season of the team, and the club's eighth season in professional soccer. This year, the team earned first place in the Eastern Division. They advanced through the North American Soccer League playoffs to the NASL Final, before losing on penalty kicks to the Los Angeles Aztecs.

== Squad ==
No.	Pos.	Nation	Player
1	GK	ARG	Osvaldo Toriani
2	DF	CUB	Rafael Argüelles
3	DF	ENG	Roger Verdi
4	DF	CHI	Esteban Aránguiz
5	DF	ENG	Ralph Wright
6	DF	ENG	Ken Mallender
7	FW	TRI	Steve David
8	DF	ARG	Roberto Aguirre
9	FW	ENG	Derek Watts
10	MF	SCO	Ronnie Sharp

No.	Pos.	Nation	Player
11	FW	TRI	Warren Archibald
12	FW	USA	Steve Baumann
13	MF	ARG	Héctor Galice
14	DF	TRI	Selris Figaro
15	DF	USA	Alan Hamlyn
16	DF	USA	Kip Jordan
17	FW	USA	Don Ries
18	GK	USA	Bill Nuttall
19	MF	BRA	Nicanor de Carvalho

== Competitions ==
=== NASL regular season ===
W = Wins, L = Losses, T= PK Shootout Wins, GF = Goals For, GA = Goals Against, PT= point system

6 points for a win, 3 points for a tie, 0 points for a loss, 1 point for each goal scored up to three per game.

Northern Division	W	L	T	GF	GA	PT
Boston Minutemen	10	9	1	36	23	94
Toronto Metros	9	10	1	30	31	87
Rochester Lancers	8	10	2	23	30	77
New York Cosmos	4	14	2	28	40	58

Eastern Division	W	L	T	GF	GA	PT
Miami Toros	9	5	6	38	24	107
Baltimore Comets	10	8	2	42	46	105
Philadelphia Atoms	8	11	1	25	25	74
Washington Diplomats	7	12	1	29	36	70

Central Division	W	L	T	GF	GA	PT
Dallas Tornado	9	8	3	39	27	100
St. Louis Stars	4	15	1	27	42	54
Denver Dynamos	5	15	0	21	42	49

Western Division	W	L	T	GF	GA	PT
Los Angeles Aztecs	11	7	2	41	36	110
San Jose Earthquakes	9	8	3	43	38	103
Seattle Sounders	10	7	3	37	17	101
Vancouver Whitecaps	5	11	4	29	31	70

=== NASL Playoffs ===
==== Semifinals ====
August 17	Miami Toros	3–1	Dallas Tornado	Tamiami Stadium • Att. 5,045

==== NASL Final 1974 ====
August 25
3:30 pm EDT

Miami Toros	3–3	Los Angeles Aztecs
Wright 17'; Sharp (penalty missed) 48' (pen.); Moraldo 72' (o.g.); Aranguiz 87'		de Rienzo 26' (pen.); Costa 78'; McMillan 88'
Penalties
Aguirre (penalty scored); Sharp (penalty scored); Mallender (penalty scored); Verdi (penalty missed)	3–5	(penalty scored) Zanotti; (penalty scored) Banhoffer; (penalty scored) Marotte; (penalty scored) Filotis; (penalty scored) Douglas

Orange Bowl, Miami, Florida
Attendance: 15,507
Referee: John Davies (USA)

==== Bracket ====
Quarter-finals
N1	Boston Minutemen	1
E2	Baltimore Comets	0
C1	Dallas Tornado	3
W2	San Jose Earthquakes	0

Semi-finals
W1	Los Angeles Aztecs	2
N1	Boston Minutemen	0
C1	Dallas Tornado	1
E1	Miami Toros	3

NASL Final 1974
W1	Los Angeles Aztecs	3(5)
E1	Miami Toros	3(3)

== See also ==
1974 Miami Toros
