= 1974 North American Soccer League season =

Soccer league season

North American Soccer League 1974 season
- Season: 1974
- Teams: 15
- Champions: Los Angeles Aztecs
- Premiers: Los Angeles Aztecs
- Matches: 150
- Goals: 488 (3.25 per match)
- Top goalscorer: (United States) Paul Child (15 goals)
- Longest winning run: 8, Los Angeles
- Highest attendance: 24,093 (Denver @ Phil)
- Lowest attendance: 1,153 (NY @ Boston)
- Average attendance: 7,825

Statistics of North American Soccer League in season 1974. This was the 7th season of the NASL.

== Overview ==
Fifteen teams comprised the league with the Los Angeles Aztecs winning the championship in a penalty kick shootout over the Miami Toros.

== Changes from the previous season ==
=== Rules changes ===
The league decided to do away with tie games. If a match was tied after 90 minutes, the teams would go directly to a standard penalty shootout with no extra time played. The outcome would appear in the standings as a 'tie-win'. The tie-winner would gain three points, plus goals in regulation, while the loser of the tie-breaker received no points, except for regulation goals. Including the 1974 NASL Final, 33 matches were decided using this method.

=== New teams ===
- Baltimore Comets
- Boston Minutemen
- Denver Dynamos
- Los Angeles Aztecs
- San Jose Earthquakes
- Seattle Sounders
- Vancouver Whitecaps
- Washington Diplomats

=== Teams folding ===
- Atlanta Apollos
- Montreal Olympique

=== Teams moving ===
- None

=== Name changes ===
- None

== Map of clubs ==
Northern Division Eastern Division Central Division Western Division

== Regular season ==
W = Wins, L = Losses, T= PK Shootout Wins, GF = Goals For, GA = Goals Against, PT= point system

6 points for a win, 3 points for a PK shootout win, 0 points for a loss, 1 point for each goal scored up to three per game.

-Premiers (most points). -Other playoff teams.

Northern Division	W	L	T	GF	GA	PT
Boston Minutemen	10	9	1	36	23	94
Toronto Metros	9	10	1	30	31	87
Rochester Lancers	8	10	2	23	30	77
New York Cosmos	4	14	2	28	40	58

Eastern Division	W	L	T	GF	GA	PT
Miami Toros	9	5	6	38	24	107
Baltimore Comets	10	8	2	42	46	105
Philadelphia Atoms	8	11	1	25	25	74
Washington Diplomats	7	12	1	29	36	70

Central Division	W	L	T	GF	GA	PT
Dallas Tornado	9	8	3	39	27	100
St. Louis Stars	4	15	1	27	42	54
Denver Dynamos	5	15	0	21	42	49

Western Division	W	L	T	GF	GA	PT
Los Angeles Aztecs	11	7	2	41	36	110
San Jose Earthquakes	9	8	3	43	38	103
Seattle Sounders	10	7	3	37	17	101
Vancouver Whitecaps	5	11	4	29	31	70

== NASL All-Stars ==
First Team	Position	Second Team	Honorable Mention
(England) Barry Watling, Seattle	G	(United States) Bob Rigby, Philadelphia	(Scotland) Ian McKechnie, Boston
(United States) Dick Hall, Dallas	D	(England) Ralph Wright, Miami	(United States) Bobby Smith, Philadelphia
(England) Albert Jackson, Dallas	D	(England) Derek Trevis, Philadelphia	(England) Patrick Greenwood, Boston
(England) Chris Dunleavy, Philadelphia	D	(Scotland) Jim Gabriel, Seattle	(England) Laurie Calloway, San Jose
(England) Geoff Butler, Baltimore	D	(Scotland) Brian Rowan, Toronto	(Scotland) Charlie Mitchell, Rochester
(Scotland) Ronnie Sharp, Miami	M	(United States) Hank Liotart, Seattle	(England) Alan Spavin, Washington
(United States) Ilija Mitic, Dallas	M	(Uruguay) Luis Marotte, Los Angeles	(England) Roy Sinclair, Seattle
(Argentina) Roberto Aguirre, Miami	M	(Portugal) Fernando Pinto, Toronto	(Poland) Dieter Zajdel, San Jose
(United States) Paul Child, San Jose	F	(United States) Ade Coker, Boston	(Trinidad and Tobago) Steve David, Miami
(England) John Rowlands, Seattle	F	(United States) Doug McMillan, Los Angeles	(England) Jim Fryatt, Philadelphia
(England) Peter Silvester, Baltimore	F	(Trinidad and Tobago) Warren Archibald, Miami	(Bermuda) Randy Horton, New York

== Playoffs ==
All playoff games in all rounds including the NASL Final were single game elimination match ups.

=== Bracket ===
Quarterfinals
N1	Boston Minutemen	1
E2	Baltimore Comets	0
C1	Dallas Tornado	3
W2	San Jose Earthquakes	0

Semifinals
W1	Los Angeles Aztecs	2
N1	Boston Minutemen	0
C1	Dallas Tornado	1
E1	Miami Toros	3

NASL Final 1974
W1	Los Angeles Aztecs	3(5)
E1	Miami Toros	3(3)

=== Quarterfinals ===
August 14	San Jose Earthquakes	0–3	Dallas Tornado	Texas Stadium • Att. 8,652

August 15	Baltimore Comets	0–1	Boston Minutemen	Alumni Stadium • Att. 9,713

=== Semifinals ===
August 17	Boston Minutemen	0–2	Los Angeles Aztecs	ELAC Stadium • Att. 5,485

August 17	Dallas Tornado	1–3	Miami Toros	Tamiami Stadium • Att. 5,045

=== NASL Final 1974 ===
August 25
3:30 pm EDT

Miami Toros	3–3	Los Angeles Aztecs
Wright 17'; Sharp (penalty missed) 48' (pen.); Moraldo 72' (o.g.); Aranguiz 87'		de Rienzo 26' (pen.); Costa 78'; McMillan 88'
Penalties
Aguirre (penalty scored); Sharp (penalty scored); Mallender (penalty scored); Verdi (penalty missed)	3–5	(penalty scored) Zanotti; (penalty scored) Banhoffer; (penalty scored) Marotte; (penalty scored) Filotis; (penalty scored) Douglas

Orange Bowl, Miami, Florida
Attendance: 15,507
Referee: John Davies (USA)

1974 NASL Champions: Los Angeles Aztecs

== Post season awards ==
- Most Valuable Player: (England) Peter Silvester, Baltimore
- Coach of the year: (Scotland) John Young, Miami
- Rookie of the year: (United States) Douglas McMillan, Los Angeles

== Attendances ==
Club	Games	Total	Average
San Jose Earthquakes	10	165,942	16,594
Seattle Sounders	10	134,342	13,434
Philadelphia Atoms	10	117,837	11,784
Vancouver Whitecaps	10	100,979	10,098
Boston Minutemen	10	96,422	9,642
Dallas Tornado	10	84,694	8,469
Miami Toros	10	73,403	7,340
St. Louis Stars	10	71,891	7,189
Rochester Lancers	10	59,078	5,908
Los Angeles Aztecs	10	50,983	5,098
Washington Diplomats	10	49,746	4,975
Denver Dynamos	10	48,402	4,840
Baltimore Comets	10	41,388	4,139
New York Cosmos	10	35,781	3,578
Toronto Metros	10	34,576	3,458
