= NASL Final 1974 =

Soccer match

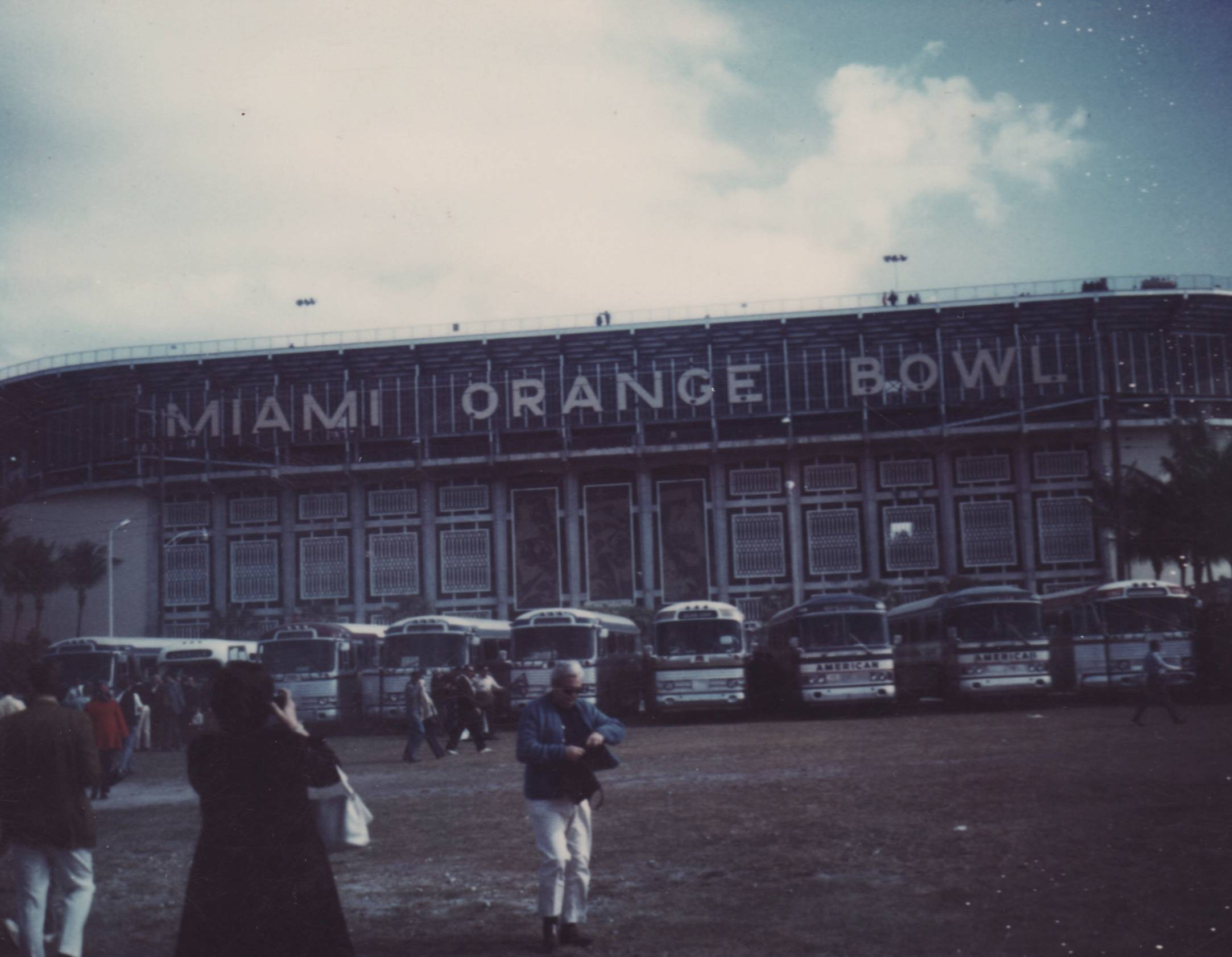
- The Orange Bowl hosted the Final
- Event: NASL Final
Miami Toros	Los Angeles Aztecs
3	3
- (Los Angeles Aztecs won 5–3 on penalties)
- Date: August 25, 1974
- Venue: Orange Bowl, Miami, Florida
- Referee: John Davies (United States)
- Attendance: 15,507

NASL Final 1974 was the championship match of the 1974 season, between the expansion Los Angeles Aztecs and the Miami Toros. The match was played on August 25, 1974 at the Orange Bowl, in Miami, Florida. The teams played to a, 3–3, draw, and after a short break the game moved directly to a penalty shoot-out. Los Angeles won the shoot-out, 5–3, and were crowned the 1974 champions. This was the second consecutive year that an expansion team won the NASL title

== Background ==
=== Los Angeles Aztecs ===
The Los Angeles Aztecs qualified for the playoffs by virtue of winning the Western Division with 110 points. The point total earned them a quarterfinal bye in the playoffs. The Aztecs defeated the Northern Division champion Boston Minutemen, 2–0, in a semifinal game played on August 17, 1974 at ELAC Stadium in Monterey Park, California to advance to the finals.

=== Miami Toros ===
The Miami Toros qualified for the playoffs by virtue of winning the Eastern Division with 107 points. They were also given a quarterfinal bye in the playoffs. The Toros defeated the Central Division champion Dallas Tornado, 3–1, in a semifinal game played on August 17, 1974 at Tamiami Stadium to advance to the finals.

=== Game site controversy ===
Although the Aztecs had a league-best record and points total, and rightly should have hosted the championship final, CBS intervened and strongly influenced the NASL's decision to play the match in Miami. CBS was under contract to air the game live and was unwilling to black-out the large Southern California viewing audience. At the time it was the standard in many U.S.-based sports for the host market not to broadcast games locally unless they were sold out. At the time, the Los Angeles Memorial Coliseum had a capacity of 94,500 and, even in a best-case scenario, an Aztecs sell-out was unlikely. Moreover, in an effort by CBS to capture more viewers during the peak East Coast time slot, a Los Angeles-hosted game would have begun at 12:30 (PDT) local time.

The league recognized that both these factors would be detrimental to ticket sales and agreed to move the game to the Miami Orange Bowl with a 3:30 (EDT) local start. CBS had also stepped in the previous week and forced the Toros to play their semi-final match at the much-smaller Tamiami Stadium in Tamiami Park. This was done so that if Miami did win, CBS's production crews would have a full week for set-up in the Orange Bowl stadium.

== Match details ==
August 25, 1974
3:30 p.m. EDT

Miami Toros	3–3	Los Angeles Aztecs
Wright 17'; Moraldo 73' (o.g.); Aránguiz 87'	Report 1 Report 2	de Rienzo 26' (pen.); Banhoffer 78'; McMillan 88'
Penalties
Aguirre (penalty scored); Sharp (penalty scored); Mallender (penalty scored); Verdi (penalty missed)	3–5	(penalty scored) Zanotti; (penalty scored) Banhoffer; (penalty scored) Marotte; (penalty scored) Filotis; (penalty scored) Douglas

Orange Bowl, Miami, Florida
Attendance: 15,507
Referee: John Davies

(United States)

Miami Toros	Los Angeles Aztecs

GK	1	(Argentina) Osvaldo Toriani
DF	14	(Trinidad and Tobago) Selris Figaro	(yellow card) 73'
DF	5	(England) Ralph Wright
DF	6	(England) Ken Mallender
DF	15	(United States) Alan Hamlyn
MF	2	(Cuba) Rafael Argüelles
MF	4	(Chile) Esteban Aranguiz
MF	11	(Trinidad and Tobago) Warren Archibald		(substituted off) 88'
FW	7	(Trinidad and Tobago) Steve David
FW	9	(England) Derek Watts		(substituted off) 77'
FW	10	(England) Ronnie Sharp (c)	(yellow card) 86'
Substitutes:
DF	3	(England) Roger Verdi		(substituted on) 88'
FW	8	(Argentina) Roberto Aguirre		(substituted on) 77'
GK	18	(United States) Bill Nuttall
Manager:
(Scotland) John Young

GK	1	(Mexico) Blas Sánchez
DF	2	(Argentina) Ricardo De Rienzo		(substituted off) 72'
DF	3	(Trinidad and Tobago) Ramon Moraldo (c)
DF	5	(Argentina) Mario Zanotti	(yellow card) 14'
DF	12	(Uruguay) Julio César Cortés
MF	6	(Mexico) Pedro Martinez
MF	8	(Brazil) Renato Costa		(substituted off) 88'
MF	10	(Uruguay) Luis Marotte
MF	11	(Trinidad and Tobago) Tony Douglas
FW	7	(United States) Doug McMillan
FW	9	(Uruguay) Uri Banhoffer	(yellow card) 86'
Substitutes:
FW	15	(United States) Jose Lopez		(substituted on) 72'
DF	16	(United States) Yeprem Nersepian
FW	18	(Turkey) Peter Filotis		(substituted on) 88'
Manager:
(Albania) Alex Perolli

1974 NASL Champions: Los Angeles Aztecs

Finals MVP:

Assistant referees:
(Canada) Paul Avis
(United States) Bob Sumpter

Television: CBS
Announcers: Frank Glieber, Clive Toye, Kyle Rote, Jr.

== Match Statistics ==
Statistic	Miami	Los Angeles
Goals scored	3	3
Total shots	25	26
Shots on target	14	12
Saves	9	12
Corner kicks	8	4
Fouls	11	12
Offsides	5	2
Yellow cards	2	2
Red cards	0	0

== See also ==
- 1974 North American Soccer League season
