= Selris Figaro =

Trinidadian footballer (born 1946)

Personal information
- Full name: Selris Figaro
- Date of birth: 20 November 1946 (age 79)
- Place of birth: Port of Spain, Trinidad and Tobago
- Height: 1.85 m (6 ft 1 in)
- Position: Defender

Youth career
- Richmond Street Boys R.C.

Senior career*
Years	Team	Apps	(Gls)
- Paragon
- TESCA
???–1969	Malvern		
1970	Washington Darts	8	(0)
1973–1975	Miami Toros	47	(2)
1976	Connecticut Yankees		

International career
1973–1976	Trinidad and Tobago	10	(1)
Medal record
Men's football
Representing Trinidad and Tobago
CONCACAF Championship
Silver medal – second place	1973 Haiti	Team
- * Club domestic league appearances and goals

Selris Figaro (born 26 November 1946) is a retired Trinidadian footballer. Nicknamed "Sellas", he is known for his career in the North American Soccer League, playing for the Washington Darts and the Miami Toros throughout the 1970s. He also represented his native Trinidad and Tobago for the 1973 CONCACAF Championship.

== Club career ==
Throughout his earlier years, he played for Paragon, TESCA and Malvern throughout the 1960s. He soon caught the interest of Washington Darts manager Norman Sutherland and played in eight matches throughout their 1970 season where he played alongside fellow Trinidadian footballers Victor Gamaldo, Gerry Browne, Bertrand Grell, Winston Alexis, Leroy DeLeon, Lincoln Phillips and Warren Archibald. Despite this, his contract was not renewed for the 1971 season and he briefly returned to Trinidad in 1971. However, in 1973, the Miami Toros took interest in Figaro and signed him for their 1973 season where he made far more appearances and even scored two goals. He continued to remain in the club for an additional two seasons as he then spent his final careers with the Connecticut Yankees in the American Soccer League until his retirement in 1976.

== international career ==
Despite being an established player, Figaro wouldn't make any appearance for the Trinidad and Tobago until the 1973 CONCACAF Championship, playing in the controversial match against hosts Haiti where it would end in a 2–1 defeat in spite of several disallowed goals from the Soca Warriors. Figaro would still remain active in the team after Trinidad's failure to qualify for the tournament however, playing in the 1977 CONCACAF Championship qualifiers where he was made captain of the team that later lost to Suriname and failed to qualify.

== Later life ==
Following his retirement, Figaro would remain active in Trinidadian football, serving as a coach to train up future talents such as Christon Thomas. He also served as a coach for Defence Force in 2018. He was also a critic of the operations of the Trinidad and Tobago Football Association due to their declining support of the TT Premier Football League, leading to reforms in 2013.

== Honours ==
Trinidad and Tobago

- CONCACAF Championship : Runner-up, 1973
