= 1977 Fort Lauderdale Strikers season =

Fort Lauderdale Strikers
1977 season
- Owner: (United States) Elizabeth Robbie
- General manager: Krikor Yepremian
- Manager: (England) Ron Newman
- Stadium: Lockhart Stadium
- NASL: Eastern Division: First place Regular season: Champions
- Top goalscorer: League: (United States) George Nanchoff (8); All: (England) Maurice Whittle (9)
- Average home league attendance: 8,148
Home colors	Away colors

The 1977 Fort Lauderdale Strikers season was the first season of the new team, and the club's eleventh season in professional soccer. It is also the first ever incarnation of the club's new name. Previously they were known as the Miami Toros. The 1977 squad won the North American Soccer League's Eastern Division of the Atlantic Conference, and was the top team in regular season with 19 victories for 161 points.

== Background ==
=== First ever match ===
The Strikers first-ever game was a preseason indoor match played on February 27, 1977 at the Bayfront Center in St. Petersburg, Florida, against the Tampa Bay Rowdies. Though only an exhibition, this was the first meeting in what was to become one of the most enduring rivalries in North American soccer, the Florida Derby. It would also set the tone for many years of indoor frustration for the Strikers as they fell, 9–8, to the hosts.

==== Match report ====
February 27, 1977 1	Tampa Bay Rowdies	9–8	Fort Lauderdale Strikers	St. Petersburg, Florida
8:00 p.m. (EST)	Lindsay 4:21' (Wegerle); Smethurst 33:13'; Smethurst 34:04' (Alston); Quraishi 41:34' (Smethurst); Smethurst 41:57' (Wegerle); Wegerle 48:29'; Smethurst 49:30' (Wegerle); Wegerle 50:41'; Alston 51:47' (Smethurst)	Report	Mulroy 12:07' (Nanchoff, Sharp); Sharp 12:27'; Nanchoff 26:40' (Chadwick); Ceballos 44:20' (Sharp); Chadwick 47:40' (Hamlyn, Sharp); Sharp 50:41'; Sharp 58:04'; Hamlyn 59:57'	Stadium: Bayfront Center; Attendance: 5,016; Referee: Sam Hornich

== Competitions ==
=== Friendlies ===
Date	Opponent	Venue	Result	Attendance	Scorers
February 27, 1977	Tampa Bay Rowdies	Bayfront Center	9–8	5,016 (indoor)	Sharp (3), Mulroy, Nanchoff, Ceballos, Chadwick, Hamlyn
March 5, 1977	Rollins College Tars	Sandspur Bowl	1–6		
March 12, 1977	Washington Diplomats	Wilde Lake High School	3–2	1,093	Sergio Ceballos (2)
March 13, 1977	Washington Diplomats	City Stadium	3–4		David Chadwick, Fred Pereira, Sergio Ceballos, Curtis Leeper
March 26, 1977	Miami Dade South	MDC South Campus			
March 27, 1977	FIU Sunblazers	FIU Soccer Stadium	0–5	1,100	
April 6, 1977	Rochester Lancers	Lockhart Stadium	2–0		Bobby Bell, Tony Whelan
June 10, 1977	(Italy) S.S. Lazio	Lockhart Stadium	1–4	3,500	Norman Piper
October 2, 1977	Business Machines, Inc.	Leonard High School	2–3	500	Tony Whelan, David Proctor, Mike Fazee

=== NASL regular season ===
W = Wins, L = Losses, GF = Goals For, GA = Goals Against, BP = Bonus Points, Pts= point system

6 points for a win, 0 points for a loss, 1 point for each regulation goal scored up to three per game.

==== Atlantic Conference ====
Eastern Division	W	L	GF	GA	BP	Pts	Home	Road
Fort Lauderdale Strikers	19	7	49	29	47	161	11–2	8–5
Cosmos	15	11	60	39	50	140	10–3	5–8
Tampa Bay Rowdies	14	12	55	45	47	131	11–2	3–10
Washington Diplomats	10	16	32	49	32	92	6–7	4–9

Northern Division	W	L	GF	GA	BP	Pts	Home	Road
Toronto Metros-Croatia	13	13	42	38	37	115	8–5	5–8
St. Louis Stars	12	14	33	35	32	104	7–6	5–8
Rochester Lancers	11	15	34	41	33	99	10–3	1–12
Chicago Sting	10	16	31	43	28	88	4–9	6–7
Connecticut Bicentennials	7	19	34	65	30	72	4–9	3–10

=== NASL Playoffs ===
==== Divisional Championships ====
Higher seed		Lower seed	Game 1	Game 2	(lower seed hosts Game 1)
Fort Lauderdale Strikers	–	Cosmos	3–8	2–3 (SO, 0–3)	August 14 • Giants Stadium • 77,691; August 17 • Lockhart Stadium 14,152

==== Bracket ====
First Round
E2	Cosmos	3
E3	Tampa Bay Rowdies	0
N2	St. Louis Stars	0(2)
N3	Rochester Lancers	0(4)
S2	Los Angeles Aztecs	2
S3	San Jose Earthquakes	1
W2	Vancouver Whitecaps	0
W3	Seattle Sounders	2

Division Championships
E1	Fort Lauderdale Strikers	0
E2	Cosmos	2
N1	Toronto Metros-Croatia	0
N3	Rochester Lancers	2
S1	Dallas Tornado	0
S2	Los Angeles Aztecs	2
W1	Minnesota Kicks	0
W3	Seattle Sounders	2

Conference Championships
E2	Cosmos	2
N3	Rochester Lancers	0
S2	Los Angeles Aztecs	0
W3	Seattle Sounders	2

Soccer Bowl '77
E2	Cosmos	2
W3	Seattle Sounders	1

== See also ==
1977 Fort Lauderdale Strikers
