= Rafael Argüelles =

Cuban–American footballer (born 1947)

Personal information
- Full name: Rafael Rodríguez Argüelles
- Date of birth: 26 November 1946 (age 79)
- Place of birth: Havana, La Habana, Cuba
- Height: 1.75 m (5 ft 9 in)
- Position: Right-back

Senior career*
Years	Team	Apps	(Gls)
1966–1970	La Habana		
1972–1975	Miami Toros	50	(0)

International career
1966–1970	Cuba		(0)
Medal record
Men's football
Representing Cuba
Central American and Caribbean Games
Gold medal – first place	Panama 1970	Team
- * Club domestic league appearances and goals

Rafael Rodríguez Argüelles (born 26 November 1946) is a retired Cuban footballer. Nicknamed "El Candado", he played as a right-back for Miami Toros throughout the mid-1970s. He also briefly represented his home country of Cuba but later defected to the United States, becoming the first Cuban footballer to do so.

== Club career ==
Whilst he would play in Cuba, he primarily played for La Habana, during which he was given the nickname of "El Candado". Following his defection to the United States, after considering retiring from football indefinitely, the then recently established Miami Toros for their 1972 season. With the Gatos he only achieved fourth and last place in the Southern Division, thus failing to access the final phase of the tournament. The following season, his team rebranded to the Miami Toros, achieving third and last place in the Eastern Division with Argüelles playing eleven of the eighteen matches played that season by the Toros, missing the last games due to injury. On 6 June 1973 he faced Brazilian side Santos led by Pelé in a friendly with the Toros who won 6–1. This made Argüelles is the only Cuban footballer to have ever played against O Rei in a match.

In the 1974 season, he and his team reached the NASL Final 1974, playing as a starter, which they lost on penalties against the Los Angeles Aztecs. The following season would see the club have their journey to the final interrupted in the semi-final. Argüelles was the second Cuban footballer to play in the top-level US championships after Jesús Villalón González who had played in the American Soccer League during the 1940s.

== International career ==
Argüelles was first called up to represent Cuba in 1966 at 19 years of age, playing alongside other players such as Jorge Massó, Dagoberto Lara, Luis Holmanza, Fernando Griñán, Gabriel Valenzuela and Humberto Martínez. His international successes would see North Korean coach Kim Yong-ha call him up to play in the 1970 Central American and Caribbean Games held at Panama. However, the harsh climate resulted in Argüelles falling ill and having to head home early.

== Personal life ==
After retiring from football, Argüelles remained to live in the US in Homestead, Florida.
