= 1970 Washington Darts season =

Washington Darts
1970 season
- Chairman: William Cousins Jr.
- Manager: Norman Sutherland
- Stadium: Brookland Stadium; 30,000
- NASL: Southern Division: First place Regular Season: First place NASL Championship: Finalist
- Top goalscorer: League: (Trinidad and Tobago) Leroy DeLeon (15 goals); All: (Trinidad and Tobago) Leroy DeLeon (16 goals)
Home colors	Away colors

The 1970 Washington Darts season was the team's first season in the North American Soccer League, and the club's fourth season in professional soccer. Previously the club fielded a team in the American Soccer League. In their initial run in the NASL, the team earned first place in the Southern Division and finished with the top record in the league. As division champions they automatically qualified for the championship game known as the NASL Final.

== Squad ==
No.	Pos.	Nation	Player
0	GK	ARG	Ramón Narváez
1	GK	TTO	Lincoln Phillips
2	DF	TTO	Selris Figaro
3	DF	HAI	Roland Crispin
4	MF	CAN	John Kerr
5	FW	TTO	Bertrand Grell
6	MF	TTO	Victor Gamaldo
7	FW	GHA	Joseph Agyemang-Gyau
8	FW	SCO	John Muir
9	FW	TTO	Gerry Browne

No.	Pos.	Nation	Player
10	MF	SCO	Billy Fraser
11	MF	TTO	Warren Archibald
12	DF	SCO	Frank Donlavey
13	DF	GHA	Willie Evans
14	FW	TTO	Leroy DeLeon
15	MF	ARG	Victorio Casa
16	DF	TTO	Winston Alexis
17	MF	SCO	Danny Paton
18	MF	CHI	Christian Gonzales
—	MF	BRA	Nana

== Competitions ==
=== NASL regular season ===
G = Games, W = Wins, L = Losses, T= Ties, GF = Goals For, GA = Goals Against, PT= point system

6 points for a win, 3 points for a tie, 0 points for a loss, 1 point for each goal scored up to three per game.

Northern Division	G	W	L	T	GF	GA	PT
Rochester Lancers	24	9	9	6	41	45	111
Kansas City Spurs	24	8	10	6	42	44	100
St. Louis Stars	24	5	17	2	26	71	60

Southern Division	G	W	L	T	GF	GA	PT
Washington Darts	24	14	6	4	52	29	137
Atlanta Chiefs	24	11	8	5	53	33	123
Dallas Tornado	24	8	12	4	39	39	92

=== NASL Playoffs ===
==== NASL Final 1970 ====
Team 1	Aggregate	Team 2	First leg	Second leg	Attendance
Rochester Lancers	4–3	Washington Darts	3–0	1–3	September 5 • Aquinas Memorial Stadium • 9,321; September 13 • Brookland Stadium • 5,543

==== First leg ====
September 5
8:00 PM (EST)

Rochester Lancers	3–0	Washington Darts
Costa 26' (Kankam); Costa 61' (Ofori); Marotti 72' (pen.)	Report

Aquinas Memorial Stadium, Rochester, New York
Attendance: 9,321
Referee: Mike Ashkenazi

Rochester	Washington

==== Second leg ====
September 13
3:00 PM (EST)

Washington Darts	3–1	Rochester Lancers
DeLeon 44' (pen.); Gyau 49' (Grell); Browne 65' (Archibald)	Report	Costa 40' (Metidieri)

Brookland Stadium, Washington, DC
Attendance: 5,543

Washington	Rochester

== See also ==
1970 Washington Darts
