= Gabriel Valenzuela (footballer) =

Cuban footballer (born 1947)

Personal information
- Date of birth: c. 1947
- Place of birth: Holguín, Cuba
- Position: Defender

Senior career*
Years	Team	Apps	(Gls)
c. 1970–1972	Azucareros		

International career
1970–1972	Cuba		
Medal record
Men's football
Representing Cuba
Central American and Caribbean Games
Gold medal – first place	Panama 1970	Team
Pan American Games
Bronze medal – third place	Cali 1971	Team
- * Club domestic league appearances and goals

Gabriel Valenzuela (born 1947) is a Cuban footballer. He played as defender for Azucareros throughout the early 1970s. He also played for his native country of Cuba for the 1970 Central American and Caribbean Games and the 1971 CONCACAF Championship.

== Career ==
Valenzuela was first called up by North Korean coach Kim Yong-ha to partake in Cuba's first international tour in a series of games against North Vietnam. He was part of the early 1970s generation that included players such as Jorge Massó, Dagoberto Lara, Luis Holmanza, Fernando Griñán, Rafael Argüelles and Humberto Martínez as the club made their first major breakthrough in their victory in the 1970 Central American and Caribbean Games. He received his largest role during the 1971 CONCACAF Championship where he was made captain of the Diablos Rojos and played in the 3–1 victory against Honduras on 23 November 1971. He made his final appearance in a series of friendlies against the Mexican Olympic team in 1972.

== Personal life ==
Alongside Dominican international footballer and friend José Pichardo, he is the Vice President of the Papi Pichardo Foundation based in Virginia which is a charity organization that sends relief funds to children in the Dominican Republic.
