= Fort Lauderdale–Tampa Bay rivalry =

Club soccer rivalry in Florida

Ft. Lauderdale Strikers – Tampa Bay Rowdies Rivalry
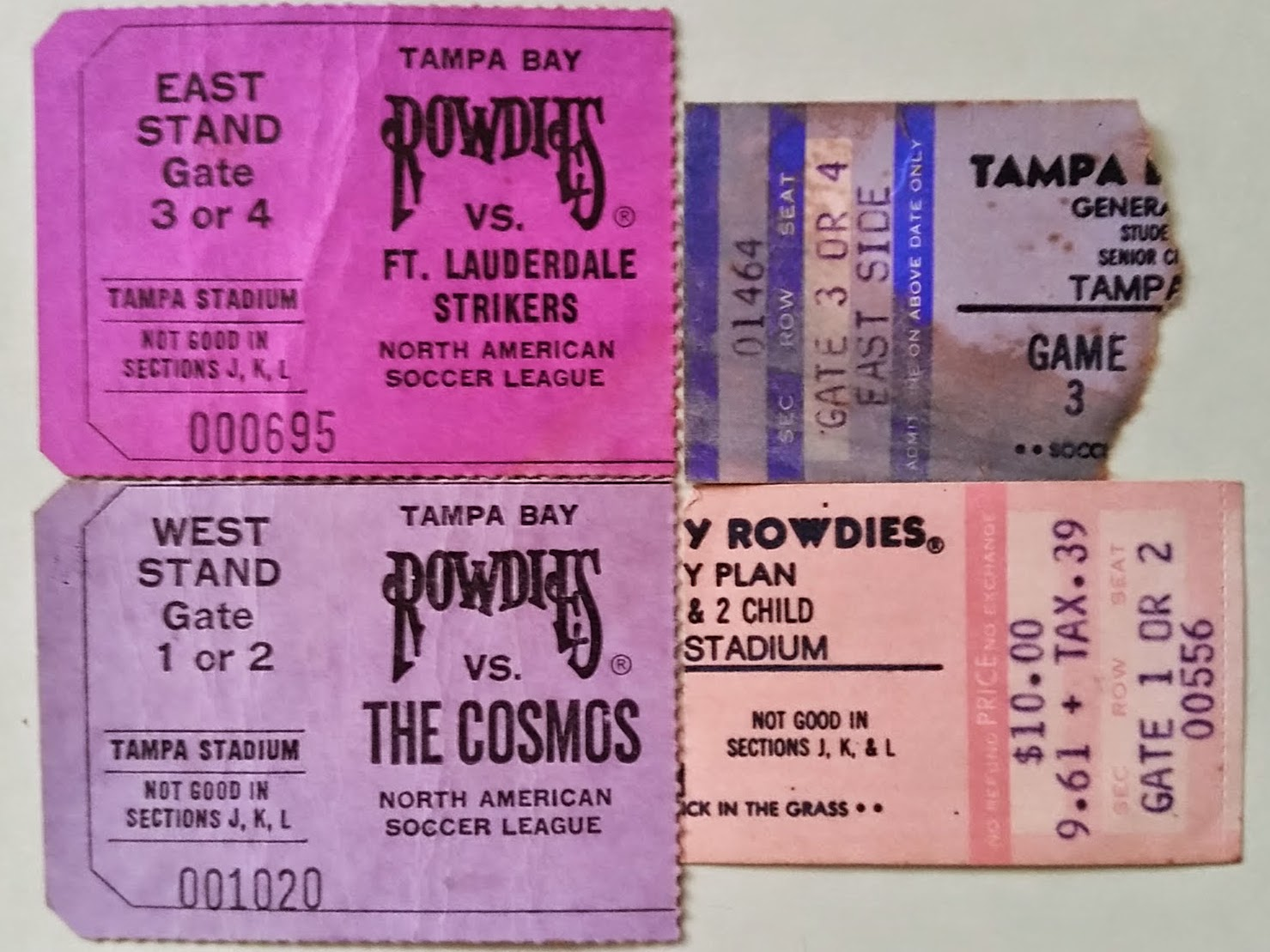
- Rowdies' supporters' match tickets from 1978, including the Florida Derby (top-left)

- Fort Lauderdale Strikers Tampa Bay Rowdies
- Other names: Florida Derby, Coastal Cup
- Location: Florida
- Teams: Fort Lauderdale Strikers vs. Tampa Bay Rowdies (see History sec. for prev. teams)
- First meeting: June 6, 1975
- Latest meeting: September 24, 2016; FtL 1–4 TB

Statistics
- Total meetings: Official: 87; All-time: 115
- Most wins: Official: Tampa Bay (44); All-time: Tampa Bay (64)
- All-time series: Official: 44–39–4 (TB); All-time: 64–45–6 (TB)
- Regular season series: League: 41–37–4 (TB); Cup: 1–1–0 (tied)
- Postseason results: All-time: *3–1–0 (TB) *includes playoff mini-game
- Largest victory: FtL 5–0 TB (August 31, 1983), TB 0–5 FtL (August 23, 1992)

The Fort Lauderdale–Tampa Bay rivalry, also known as the Florida Derby, refers to the suspended soccer rivalry that most recently involved the Fort Lauderdale Strikers and the Tampa Bay Rowdies, both of whom played in the North American Soccer League through the 2016 season. Over the years the rivalry has spanned more than one hundred matches across eight soccer leagues and several tournaments, and involved nine different teams from the two regions of Florida. At times it has involved players, coaches, management and fans. Even the press has fanned the rivalry's flames at times. From 2010 through 2014, the winner of the regular season series automatically won the Coastal Cup as well. The status of the rivalry beyond 2016 remains unclear because the Rowdies have since joined the United Soccer League, while the Strikers ongoing ownership and legal battles of 2016 and 2017 have left them defunct.

== History ==
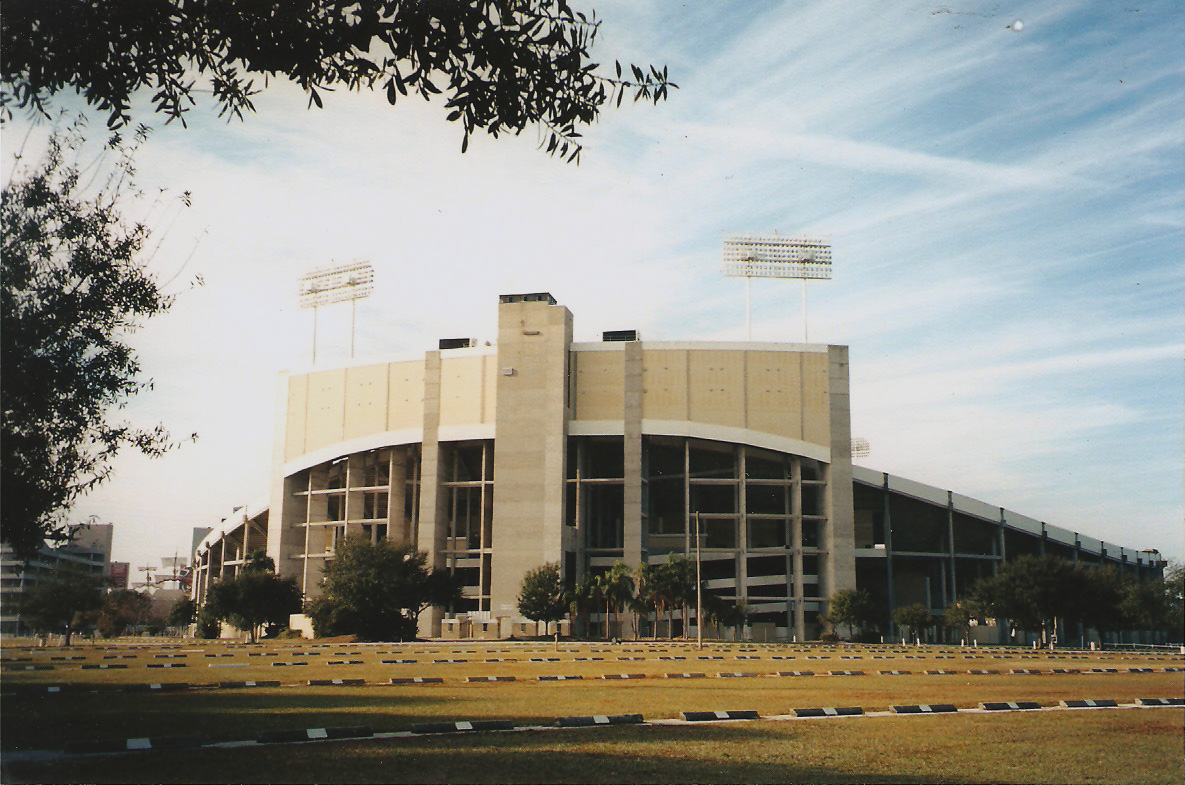
The original Tampa Bay Rowdies played at Tampa Stadium throughout the original NASL era.

=== Early history (Miami vs. Tampa Bay) ===
The Florida Derby can trace its roots to June 6, 1975, when the upstart Tampa Bay Rowdies first played the Miami Toros in the original North American Soccer League. The Toros had finished the previous season as league runners-up, while the Rowdies were just an expansion team. The makings of a rivalry were there from the start, as the two squads came into the match tied for the best record in the league. Four minutes into that first-ever meeting, an on-field brawl erupted and two players were sent off. The accusations of foul play by both clubs continued throughout the season every time they played. This all came to head when they wound up meeting in the semi-finals of the NASL playoffs. The Rowdies coolly dispatched the Toros 3–0, en route to the Soccer Bowl '75 title. The two squads played six times over those first two years, including the one playoff match. The Toros' fortunes waned in 1976 and the franchise eventually moved to Fort Lauderdale to become the Strikers. It was then that the rivalry really began to take shape.

=== Original NASL ===
The Rowdies and the original Fort Lauderdale Strikers first met in an indoor friendly on February 27, 1977 after the Miami Toros had moved to Fort Lauderdale and changed their name. It was around the time of their first outdoor meeting on May 7, 1977, that the term "Florida Derby" first appeared in local media reports. As NASL franchises they faced each other over 40 times, including 20 regular season games, 2 playoff games, 1 playoff mini-game, 5 friendlies, 12 times indoors and several reserve squad matches. During the 1983 NASL Grand Prix of Indoor Soccer, they also met in the finals of a $5,000 shoot-out challenge (which Tampa Bay won). The intrastate rivalry appeared to have run its course following the 1983 outdoor season, when the Strikers moved to Minnesota for the 1984 NASL season.

=== Interleague match ===
To fill the Strikers' void, a new team in a new league began play at Lockhart Stadium in 1984. The team was the Fort Lauderdale Sun and the league was the United Soccer League. The Sun were owned by former Striker, Ronnie Sharp, and the roster featured 14 NASL veterans, eight of whom were ex-Strikers, including Teófilo Cubillas, Curtis Leeper, Colin Fowles, and player–coach Keith Weller. With so many NASL connections, it was not surprising that the Rowdies and Sun met for a friendly on June 27, with more matches planned for the future. Once again the rivalries flames were stoked by Rowdies' coach, Rodney Marsh. In his post-match comments, while praising the Sun squad he added that the Fort Lauderdale fans were "still ignorant." The NASL even considered merging with the USL for the 1985 season before finally folding. Alas, the beleaguered new league also ceased operations in 1985, only six match days into its second season.

=== Post-NASL years ===
Four years later, the same Rowdies franchise and a new incarnation of the Strikers, were playing one another in the D2, American Soccer League. After two years both teams joined the newly formed American Professional Soccer League. During this era the two clubs would meet up twenty-one times, including the 1992 Professional Cup semi-finals. In 1992 the two clubs also staged an NASL reunion match to benefit a local charity. This era of the derby continued through the 1993 season, after which the original Rowdies folded. The Strikers of that time lasted only one more year themselves, before closing up shop as well.

=== MLS era ===
The rivalry's fourth phase came to be in 1998 when the newly formed Miami Fusion joined the Tampa Bay Mutiny in Major League Soccer. Although their name implied they were based in Miami, the Fusion's home games were played in Ft. Lauderdale at Lockhart Stadium. Several of the derby's players from previous eras, such as Ray Hudson, Thomas Rongen, Perry Van der Beck, Eddie Austin, Farrukh Quarishi, Ivan McKinley and Nick Sakiewicz, ultimately found themselves employed by these MLS clubs. Hudson, who provided the Fusion's broadcast color commentary and later coached them, was one of the most vocal advocates of the rivalry's continuance during this era. Even the "Florida Derby" moniker was resurrected, despite neither team being directly linked to their footballing forebears. These two sides met only seventeen times, as both squads were contracted before the 2002 MLS season, thus putting the regional battle on ice once again.

The rivalry between current Florida MLS sides Inter Miami CF and Orlando City SC has also unofficially been called the "Florida Derby", among other names.

=== New NASL ===
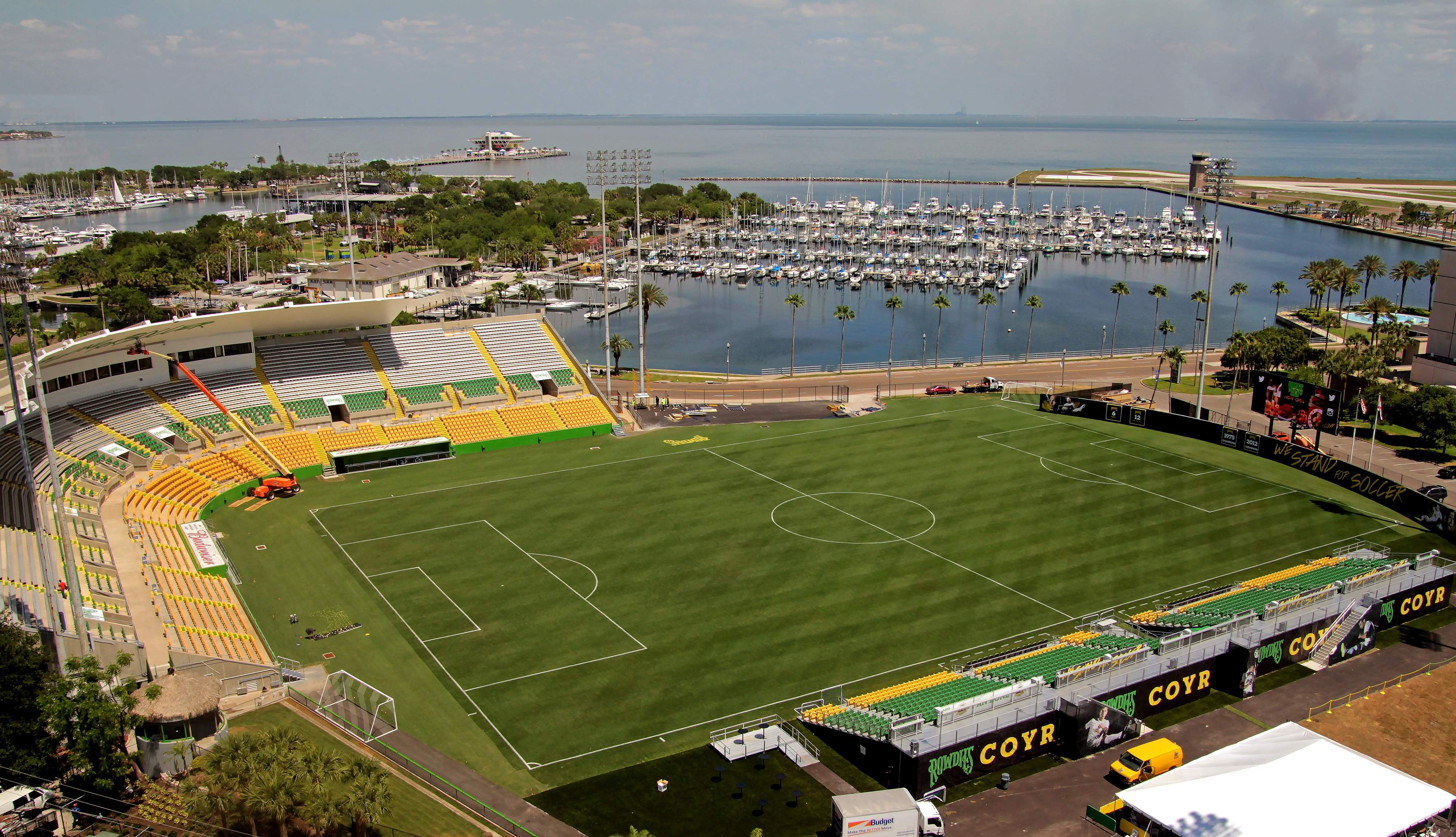
FC Tampa Bay moved into the Al Lang Stadium in St. Petersburg in 2011, becoming the "Rowdies" prior to the 2012 season.

In 2010 the rivalry rose from the ashes yet again into its most recent form, as FC Tampa Bay (licensing issues kept them from using the Rowdies name and logo until December 2011) and Miami FC (playing out of Fort Lauderdale) joined the North American Soccer League conference of the USSF Division 2 Professional League. One year later the new NASL became the USSF's sole sanctioned D2 League and Miami FC re-branded themselves as the Fort Lauderdale Strikers. In doing so they became the fourth club to bear that historic name. As of the 2016 NASL season the current versions of the Rowdies and Strikers have played twenty-eight times, including two friendlies and once in the second round of the U.S. Open Cup. In 2010 the term "Florida Derby" again resurfaced in the media as a reference to the regional rivalry. From 2010 until 2014 the winner of the season series also automatically laid claim to the Coastal Cup. The Rowdies won the first four, and the Strikers captured their first Coastal Cup in 2014. In 2015 and 2016 however, the Coastal Cup expanded to include two Florida-based NASL expansion teams, Jacksonville Armada FC and the new Miami FC.

The Rowdies departed from the NASL in October 2016, and began play in the United Soccer League in 2017. That coupled with the filing of a lawsuit by Tampa Bay owner, Bill Edwards, in November 2016 to gain control of the Strikers because of unpaid debts, cast a huge shadow over the short-term future of the rivalry. Fort Lauderdale opted not to field a team in 2017, although the franchise still existed on paper.

=== Lawsuit of 2016–17 ===
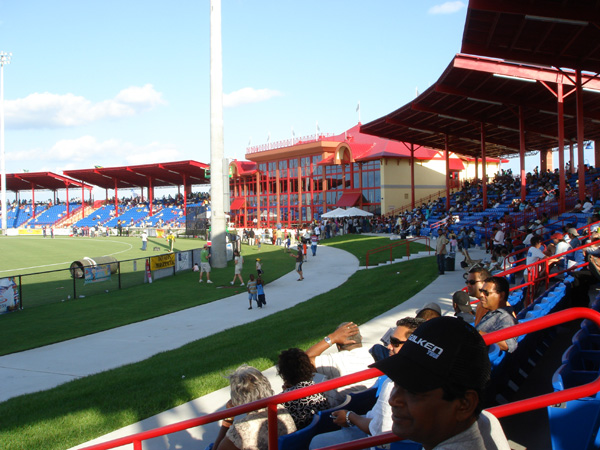
The last Fort Lauderdale Strikers team ended their days in Lauderhill at Central Broward Regional Park, playing their final season in 2016.

The rivalry began a bizarre chapter in November 2016 when Tampa Bay owner, Bill Edwards, filed a complaint in Pinellas County, Florida against the Strikers' holding company, Miami FC, LLC, over money loaned to the struggling club. In his suit Edwards claimed that they had failed to pay him back $300,000 in loans. Edwards is seeking damages and foreclosure on Fort Lauderdale's assets in the lawsuit. A signed promissory note details that the collateral the team put up to secure the loans included the team's patents, copyrights, trademarks, rights to use of the name "Fort Lauderdale Strikers" along with other tangible assets. Although the league was also named in the suit, he is only seeking a judgement from the Strikers.

The suit alleged that Edwards entered into a loan agreement with Strikers' ownership in July 2016, by transferring $450,000 to his team's cross-state rivals via his own company, Marketing Solutions Publications. A few weeks later his company made an additional loan of $120,000. Court records for the case imply that shortly after that, both parties agreed to an amendment to the original deal in which the Strikers were released from the initial $450,000 loan and Edwards agreed to loan them another $120,000. The new amendment specified that Fort Lauderdale's total debt would not surpass the $240,000 already owed, but according to Edwards’ complaint, he agreed to wire another $80,000 to the Strikers on September 2 because the team lacked sufficient funds to host a match against the New York Cosmos the next day.

In May 2017 Edwards was awarded a summary judgement in the case, and after a June 20 public sale, he gained full control of the copyrights, trademarks and any rights to the use of the name "Fort Lauderdale Strikers" or any variation for $5,100. Edwards has not yet announced what he plans to do with the Strikers brand going forward.

=== USL Renaissance ===
Miami FC, a former member of the NASL, joined the USL Championship in 2020 from National Independent Soccer Association, having bought their franchise rights from the recently-folded Ottawa Fury FC, reigniting a part of the former rivalry. However, the main rivalry between Tampa Bay and Fort Lauderdale will fully return as a possibility in 2026, when Fort Lauderdale United FC joins USL League One. Both teams, being a part of the United Soccer League ecosystem, and will be able to compete against each other in the USL Cup, a league cup that allows teams from both the USL Championship and USL League One to participate. Also, in 2028, USL will be implementing Promotion and relegation into its league system, allowing for the possibility of both teams being in the same league in the near future.

== Statistics ==
As of August 13, 2017

Competition	Matches	Wins		Draws
Competition	Matches	Tampa Bay	Fort Lauderdale	Draws
NASL (1975–1983)	25	14	11	0
ASL (1988–1989)	6	2	4	0
APSL (1990–1993)	14	5	9	0
MLS (1998–2001)	12	5	7	0
D2 Pro League (2010)	4	1	0	3
NASL (2011–2016)	21	14	6	1
Totals -League	82	41	37	4
NASL playoffs	4	3	1	0
Professional Cup	1	1	0	0
US Open Cup	1	0	1	0
Totals -Tournament	6	4	2	0
NASL indoor (1979–1983)	10	9	1	0
friendlies (all formats)	17	10	5	2
All-time Totals	115	64	45	6

== New Era in Women's Soccer ==
A new era in the rivalry began in 2024 when USL Super League clubs Fort Lauderdale United FC and Tampa Bay Sun FC began play in the new Division One women's league. The rivalry climaxed in the inaugural USL Super League season as both clubs met in the championship match in Tampa, where ultimately the Sun won over Fort Lauderdale 1–0. Cecilie Fløe scored the game-winner in added extra time in the 100th minute to secure the victory for the Sun.

Date	Venue	Score	Competition	Attendance	Ref.
August 8, 2024	Riverfront Stadium	1–1	Preseason friendly		
November 10, 2024	Beyond Bancard Field	1–1	USLSL Regular Season	1,976	
February 8, 2025	Riverfront Stadium	2–2	USLSL Regular Season	2,990	
March 8, 2025	Beyond Bancard Field	1–1	USLSL Regular Season	2,260	
April 5, 2025	Riverfront Stadium	2–0	USLSL Regular Season	2,708	
June 14, 2025	Riverfront Stadium	1–0	USLSL Final	5,006	

Tampa Bay wins	Draws	Ft. Lauderdale wins
2	4	0

== Records ==
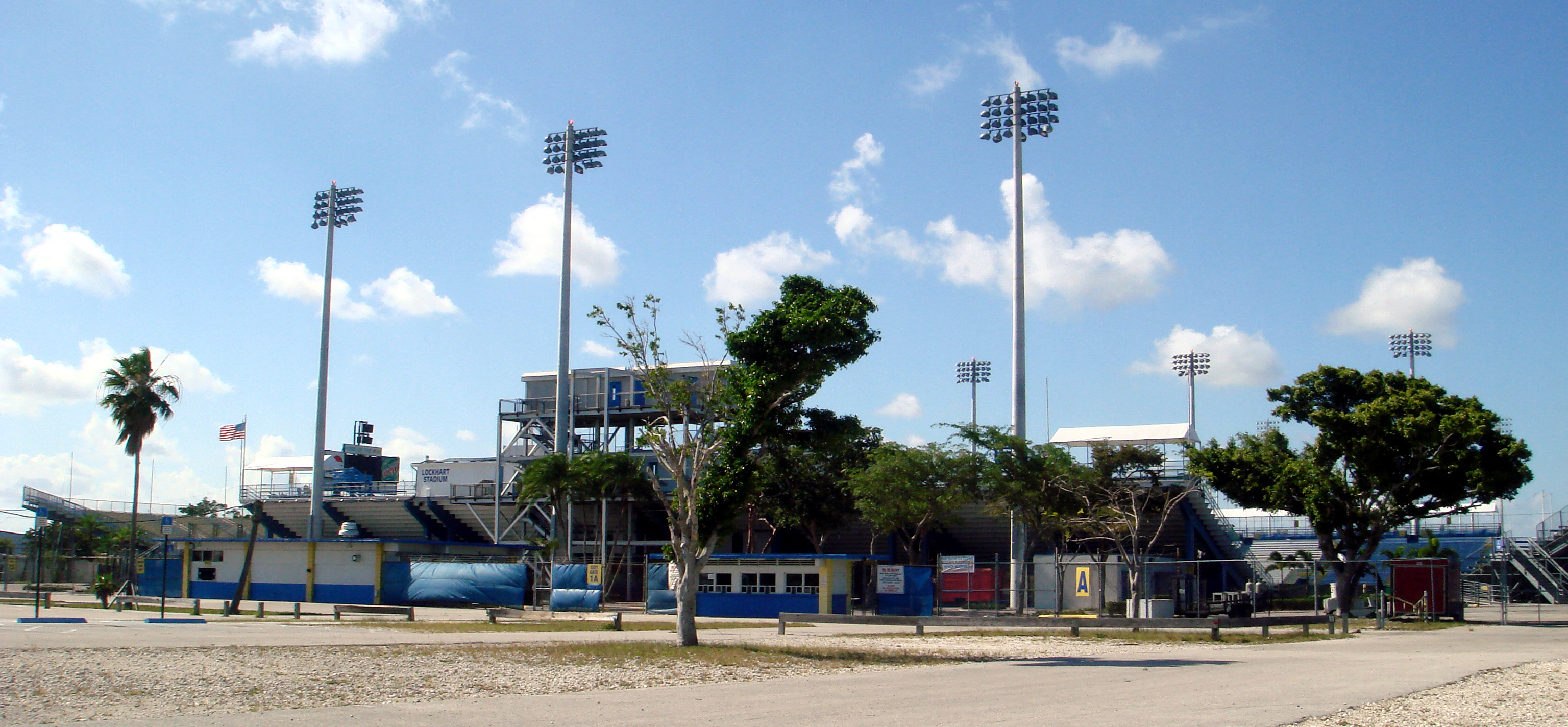
Lockhart Stadium in Fort Lauderdale has hosted 44 derbies, having been home to five different sides, the Strikers (NASL), Fort Lauderdale Sun, Strikers (APSL), Miami Fusion, and Miami FC.

As of October 2016, Lockhart Stadium in Fort Lauderdale has hosted the most matches with 44. In a distant second place, Tampa Stadium served as the venue of record on 26 occasions, followed by the Rowdies' current home of Al Lang Stadium, with 13 games. The largest crowd to ever attend this derby was 41,102 and occurred on June 23, 1979, at Tampa Stadium. On June 8, 1980, a crowd of 18,223 fans packed into Lockhart Stadium, representing the largest crowd in a South Florida edition of the derby. Both of those matches saw the visitors win, 2–1, in overtime. The lowest attended official games in the derby's history were both cup matches. The 1992 Professional Cup semifinal drew in only 356 fans to a rain-soaked Tampa Stadium on September 4, 1992, while their second round tie in the U.S. Open Cup, also in the rain, brought out a feeble 972 to Lockhart on June 22, 2012. All-time to date, 22 matches in this derby have reached the end regulation time with the teams level on goals, but only 6 ended in a draw. The other 16 games used Extra Time, Golden Goal, Penalty Kick shoot-outs or NASL style shoot-outs to determine a winner. Among these tied matches, the Fort Lauderdale-based clubs hold a sizable edge of 10 wins, 5 draws, and 6 losses. The Miami Fusion had won a 1998 preseason friendly in a shootout, but MLS officials later declared the match a draw because the Fusion inadvertently used two players in the shootout who had already been substituted out during kept time.

Although other Florida teams, including the Jacksonville Teamen, Orlando Lions and Miami Sharks/Freedom among others, have played against several of these clubs from Tampa Bay and Fort Lauderdale, for whatever reason none has ever been able to match their intensity level on a regular basis.

== Supporters ==
Back in the rivalry's early days, the cheers were led by the "Fannies" in Tampa Bay, while "Striker Likers" led in Fort Lauderdale. Each side regularly made claims about the rudeness of the other's fans, such as being jeered at, pelted with rocks, spit on, doused with sodas or even chased down and attacked whenever visiting the other's stadium. The rivalry between these supporters has earned points for a type of ugliness ugliness not normally seen in other American soccer rivalries. At one point, things quite got a downright rank: During a match in Tampa in 1981, a couple of rotting fish, decked out (possiby Rowdies fans) in the Strikers' red, yellow and black, were tossed up on the Ft. Lauderdale goal netting for all to smell.

Today the heart of the rivalry between the two sides exists primarily with the two clubs' supporter groups. Most recently, the Fort Lauderdale Strikers have been supported by the groups Miami Ultras and Flight 19. The Rowdies are supported by Ralph's Mob, an independent supporters association that alludes to "Ralph Rowdie"—the mascot in the original Rowdies logo.

== Past results ==
=== NASL (1975–1976): Rowdies vs. Miami Toros ===
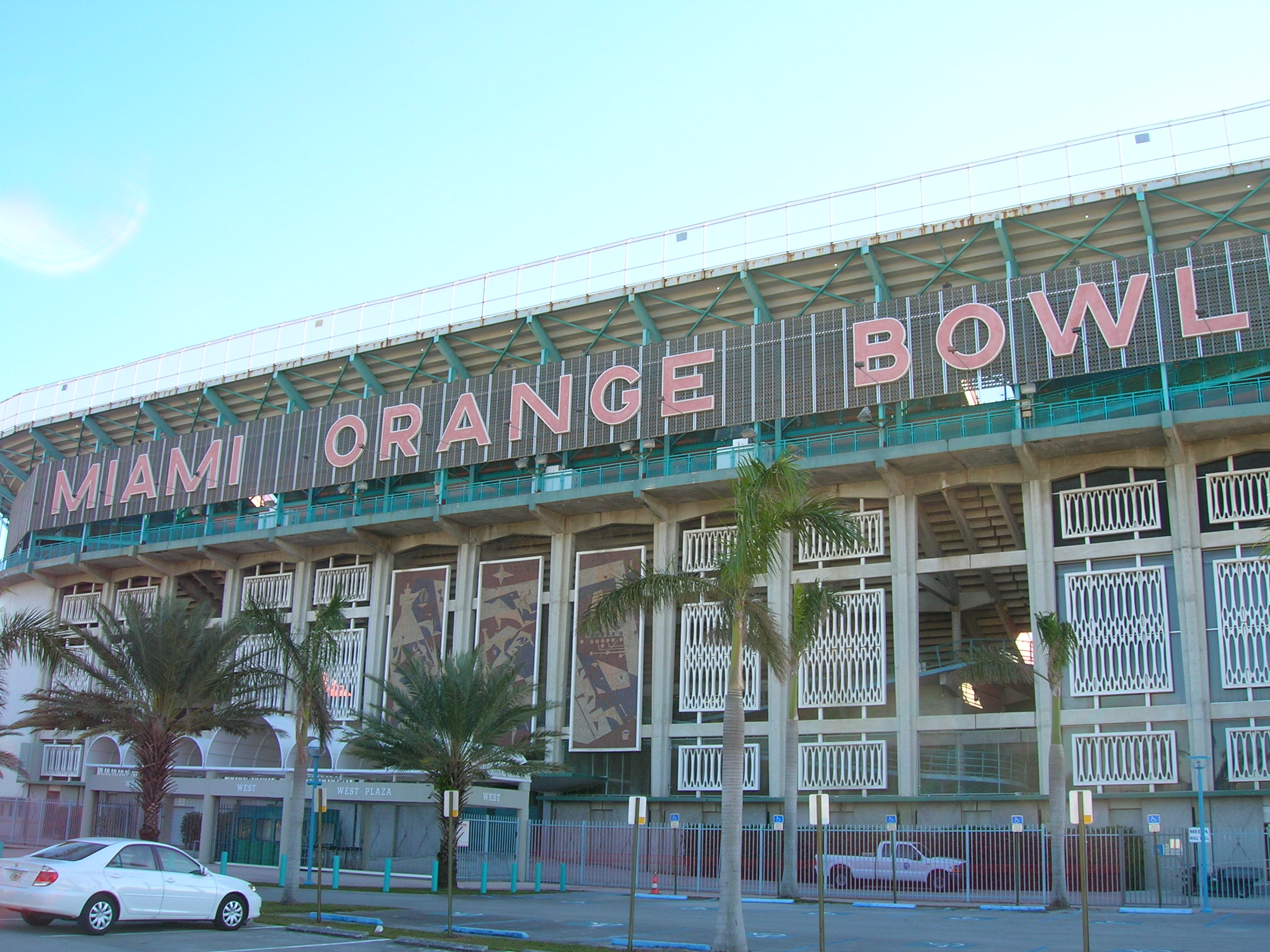
The first game of the rivalry was held at the Miami Orange Bowl, home to the Miami Toros.

Date	Venue	Score	Competition	Attendance	Ref.
June 6, 1975	Miami Orange Bowl	0–1	NASL Regular Season	14,259	
June 11, 1975	Tampa Stadium	0–2	NASL Regular Season	18,654	
July 23, 1975	Tampa Stadium	5–1	NASL Regular Season	11,415	
August 16, 1975	Tampa Stadium	3–0	NASL Playoff Semi-finals	22,710	
July 2, 1976	Tamiami Stadium	1–2	NASL Regular Season	3,500 (est.)	
July 24, 1976	Tampa Stadium	4–1	NASL Regular Season	15,951	

Tampa Bay wins	Draws	Miami Toros wins
5	0	1

=== NASL (1977–1983): Rowdies vs. Strikers ===
Date	Venue	Score	Competition	Attendance	Ref.
May 7, 1977	Tampa Stadium	1–0	NASL Regular Season	24,753	
July 1, 1977	Lockhart Stadium	3–2	NASL Regular Season	9,325	
March 4, 1978	Dade North Stadium	2–0	NASL Friendly	3,248	
June 17, 1978	Tampa Stadium	3–2(OT)	NASL Regular Season	22,506	
July 17, 1978	Lockhart Stadium	2–1	NASL reserve squads	500 (est.)	
July 26, 1978	Lockhart Stadium	1–2	NASL Regular Season	15,094	
August 20, 1978	Lockhart Stadium	3–2	NASL Playoff Semifinal, Game 1	16,286	
August 23, 1978	Tampa Stadium	3–1	NASL Playoff Semifinal, Game 2	37,249	
August 23, 1978	Tampa Stadium	1–0(SO)	NASL Playoff Semifinal, Mini-game	(37,249)	
April 28, 1979	Lockhart Stadium	1–2	NASL Regular Season	16,668	
June 23, 1979	Tampa Stadium	1–2(OT)	NASL Regular Season	41,102	
September 14, 1979	Tampa Stadium	3–0	Rodney Marsh Testimonial	20,655	
June 8, 1980	Lockhart Stadium	1–2(OT)	NASL Regular Season	18,223	
August 2, 1980	Tampa Stadium	1–0	NASL Regular Season	40,368	
May 16, 1981	Tampa Stadium	1–0(SO)	NASL Regular Season	24,102	
May 20, 1981	Lockhart Stadium	3–2(OT)	NASL Regular Season	14,144	
August 9, 1981	Lockhart Stadium	1–0	NASL Regular Season	15,113	
August 16, 1981	Tampa Stadium	3–2	NASL Regular Season	25,650	
April 10, 1982	Tampa Stadium	2–3	NASL Regular Season	25,390	
May 5, 1982	Lockhart Stadium	2–3	NASL Regular Season	15,205	
June 9, 1982	Tampa Stadium	4–2	NASL Regular Season	15,211	
July 31, 1982	Tampa Stadium	1–3	Sunshine International Series	21,220	
August 18, 1982	Lockhart Stadium	2–1	NASL Regular Season	11,426	
April 5, 1983	Florida Citrus Bowl	2–1	NASL Friendly	1,100	
April 16, 1983	Lockhart Stadium	1–2(OT)	NASL Friendly	8,152	
June 4, 1983	Lockhart Stadium	4–3	NASL Regular Season	11,047	
July 9, 1983	Tampa Stadium	2–3	NASL Regular Season	8,319	
August 24, 1983	Tampa Stadium	1–2	NASL Regular Season	5,780	
August 31, 1983	Lockhart Stadium	5–0	NASL Regular Season	7,024	

Tampa Bay wins	Draws	Ft. Lauderdale wins
15	0	14

=== NASL Indoor (1977–1983): Rowdies vs. Strikers ===
It is readily acknowledged that indoor soccer is a different sport than association football. These matches are included as part of the all-time rivalry due to the fact that they were sanctioned by the NASL and contested by players under contract for the two NASL franchises at the time.

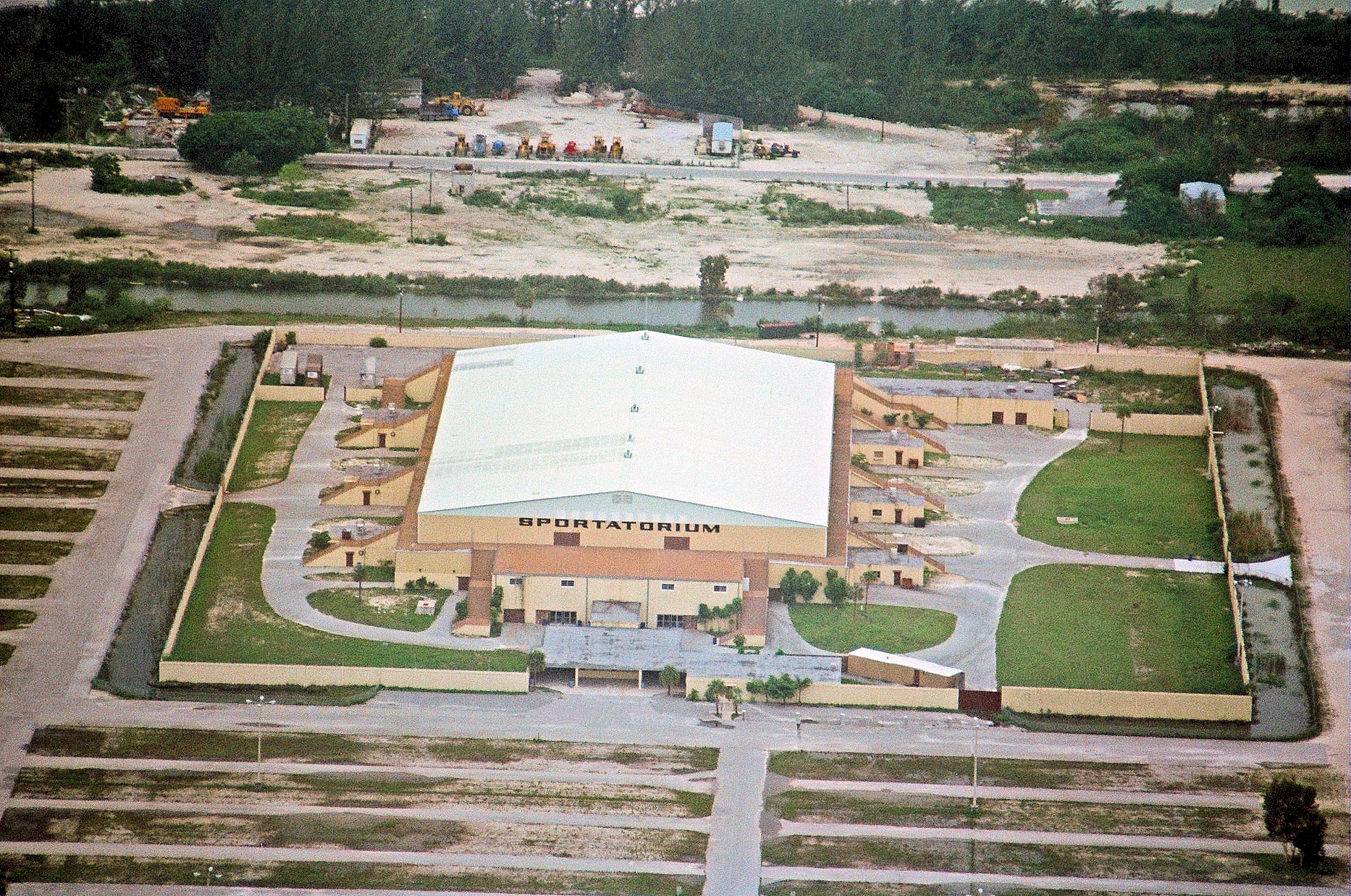
The Strikers played indoor soccer at the Hollywood Sportatorium in Pembroke Pines in the 1980–81 season.

Date	Venue	Score	Competition	Attendance	Ref.
February 27, 1977	Bayfront Center	9–8	NASL Indoor Friendly	5,016	
January 27, 1979	Bayfront Center	6–4	NASL Budweiser Invitational	6,342	
November 27, 1979	West Palm Beach Auditorium	4–6	NASL Indoor Regular Season	2,834	
January 12, 1980	Bayfront Center	6–5	NASL Indoor Regular Season	6,243	
February 6, 1980	West Palm Beach Auditorium	8–10	NASL Indoor Regular Season	1,468	
December 19, 1980	Hollywood Sportatorium	5–12	NASL Indoor Regular Season	1,673	
December 23, 1980	Bayfront Center	7–4	NASL Indoor Regular Season	5,063	
February 7, 1981	Bayfront Center	7–4	NASL Indoor Regular Season	5,545	
February 12, 1981	Hollywood Sportatorium	8–7(OT)	NASL Indoor Regular Season	1,688	
February 5, 1983	Bayfront Center	10–6	NASL Indoor Grand Prix	5,545	
February 11, 1983	Tulsa Fairgrounds Pavilion	7–5	NASL Indoor Grand Prix	2,064	
February 25, 1983	Lakeland Civic Center	8–5	NASL Indoor Friendly	3,506	

Tampa Bay wins	Draws	Ft. Lauderdale wins
11	0	1

=== NASL/USL (1984): Rowdies vs. Sun ===
Date	Venue	Score	Competition	Attendance	Ref.
June 27, 1984	Lockhart Stadium	1–5	Inter-league friendly	3,104	

Tampa Bay wins	Draws	Ft. Lauderdale wins
1	0	0

=== ASL/APSL (1988–1993): Rowdies vs. Strikers ===
Date	Venue	Score	Competition	Attendance	Ref.
April 30, 1988	Lockhart Stadium	1–0(PKs)	ASL Regular Season	6,141	
May 7, 1988	Tampa Stadium	0–1(PKs)	ASL Regular Season	4,753	
August 5, 1988	Lockhart Stadium	3–1	ASL Regular Season	3,877	
May 13, 1989	Tampa Stadium	3–0	ASL Regular Season	5,624	
July 22, 1989	Lockhart Stadium	0–3	ASL Regular Season	3,122	
August 5, 1989	Lockhart Stadium	5–2	ASL Regular Season	4,133	
July 21, 1990	Tampa Stadium	0–2	APSL Regular Season	2,760	
July 26, 1990	Pompano Beach Municipal Stadium	1–2	APSL Regular Season	1,569	
May 18, 1991	Lockhart Stadium	2–1	APSL Regular Season	4,113	
June 22, 1991	USF Soccer Stadium	0–1	APSL Regular Season	3,791	
July 6, 1991	Lockhart Stadium	2–1	APSL Regular Season	3,123	
August 24, 1991	USF Soccer Stadium	2–1(OT)	APSL Regular Season	2,381	
May 30, 1992	USF Soccer Stadium	0–1	APSL Regular Season	3,494	
July 3, 1992	Lockhart Stadium	0–1	APSL Regular Season	1,709	
August 16, 1992	Lockhart Stadium	1–2	NASL Alumni Reunion Match	(1,455)	
August 16, 1992	Lockhart Stadium	2–1(OT)	APSL Regular Season	1,455	
August 23, 1992	USF Soccer Stadium	0–5	APSL Regular Season	1,021	
September 4, 1992	Tampa Stadium	1–0	Professional Cup Semi-Final	356	
May 1, 1993	Lockhart Stadium	3–2	APSL Regular Season	5,102	
June 12, 1993	Tampa Stadium	3–5	APSL Regular Season	6,019	
August 28, 1993	Lockhart Stadium	0–2	APSL Regular Season	3,683	
August 29, 1993	Tampa Stadium	6–2	APSL Regular Season	3,875	

Tampa Bay wins	Draws	Ft. Lauderdale wins
9	0	13

=== MLS (1998–2001): Mutiny vs. Fusion ===
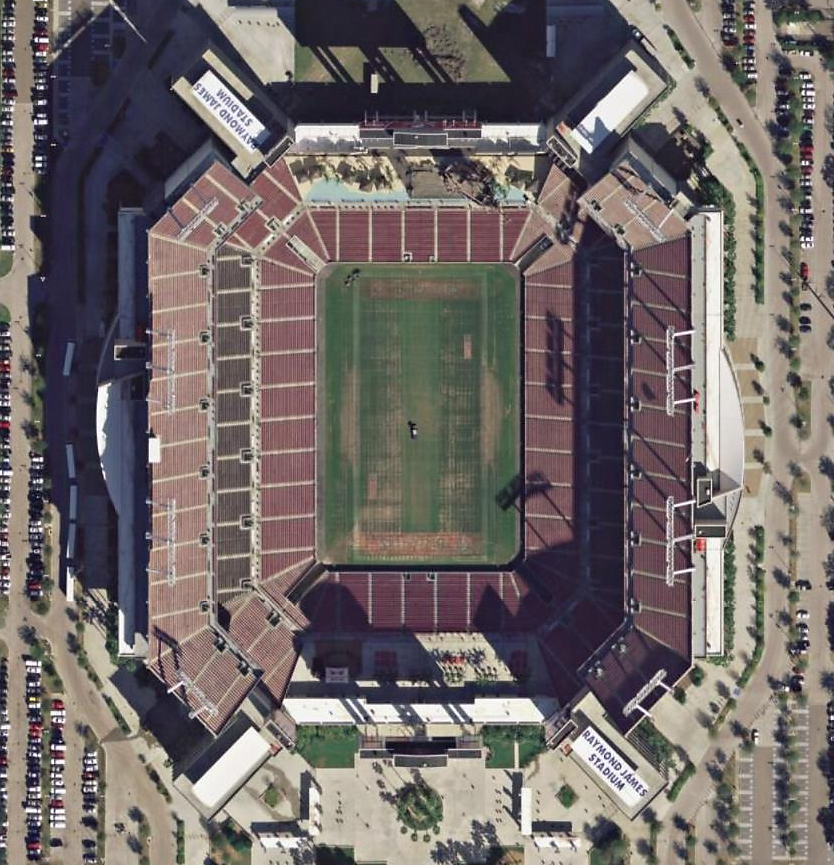
Raymond James Stadium was home to the Tampa Bay Mutiny from 1999 until both Florida-based MLS sides were contracted in 2002.

Date	Venue	Score	Competition	Attendance	Ref.
March 5, 1998	Pepin-Rood Stadium	1–1*	MLS Friendly	700	
March 26, 1998	Tampa Stadium	0–1(SO)	MLS Regular Season	6,036	
June 27, 1998	Lockhart Stadium	2–1(SO)	MLS Regular Season	8,343	
August 6, 1998	Tampa Stadium	3–1	MLS Regular Season	6,511	
September 27, 1998	Lockhart Stadium	1–3	MLS Regular Season	7,849	
March 4, 1999	Lockhart Stadium	2–0	MLS Friendly	500	
March 7, 1999	Land o' Lakes Recreation Complex	3–1	MLS Friendly	2,000 (est.)	
May 1, 1999	Raymond James Stadium	2–1	MLS Regular Season	15,120	
May 29, 1999	Lockhart Stadium	2–1	MLS Regular Season	8,628	
June 5, 1999	Raymond James Stadium	1–0	MLS Regular Season	18,377	
July 29, 1999	Lockhart Stadium	3–2(SO)	MLS Regular Season	9,172	
June 21, 2000	Raymond James Stadium	1–4	MLS Regular Season	5,269	
June 24, 2000	Lockhart Stadium	2–3	MLS Regular Season	8,143	
February 10, 2001	Gateway Park	2–2	MLS Friendly	1,000 (est.)	
March 24, 2001	Lockhart Stadium	2–3	MLS Friendly	4,200	
May 19, 2001	Lockhart Stadium	3–1	MLS Regular Season	12,412	
May 26, 2001	Raymond James Stadium	0–4	MLS Regular Season	12,988	

Tampa Bay Mutiny wins	Draws	Miami Fusion FC wins
7	2*	8

*March 5, 1998, match was declared a draw because Fusion used two ineligible players in shootout-tiebreaker.

=== USSF D2 Pro/NASL (2010–2016): FC Tampa Bay/Rowdies vs. Miami FC/Strikers ===
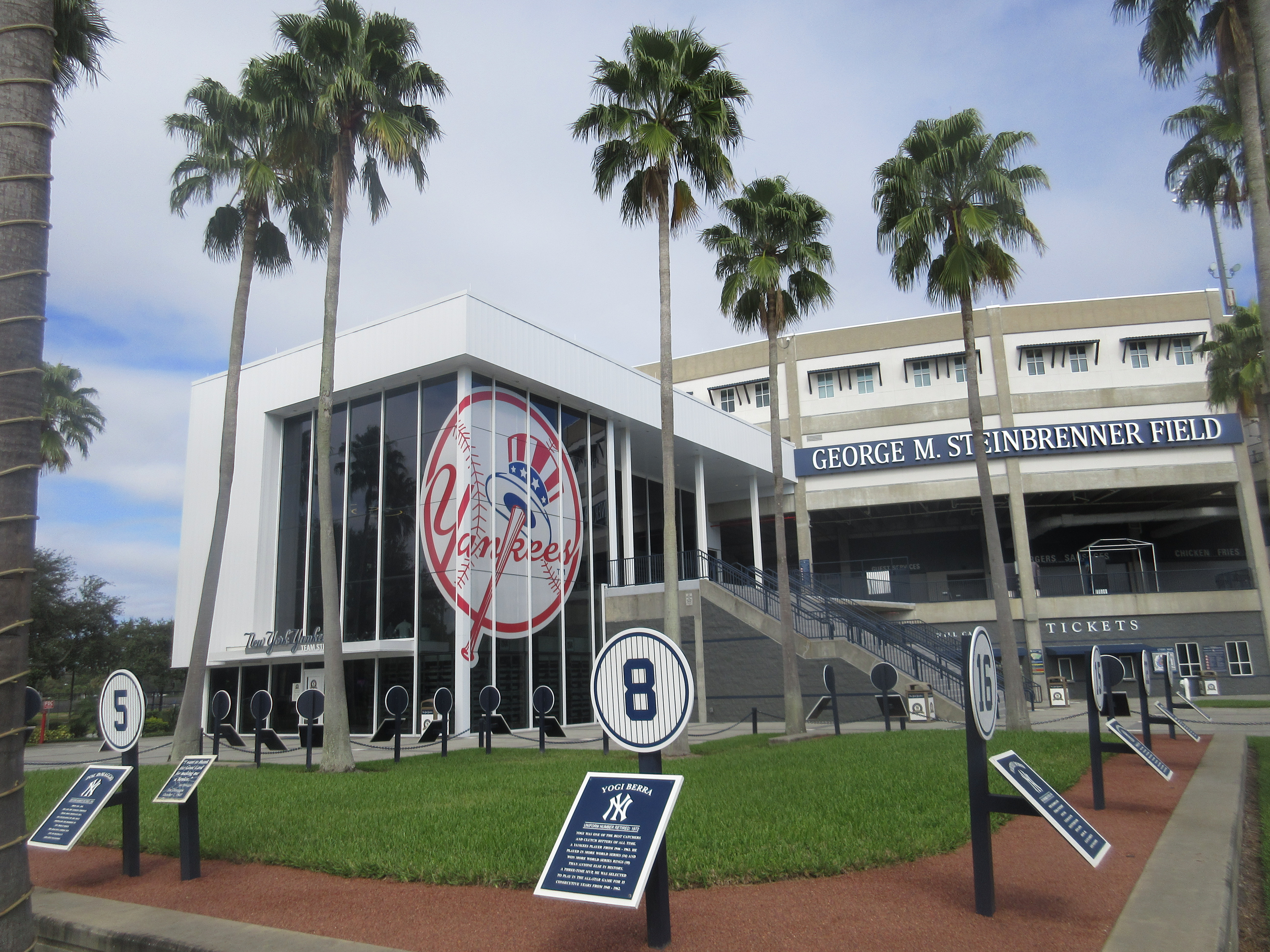
FC Tampa Bay started play at George M. Steinbrenner Field in Tampa, in the 2010 season.

Date	Venue	Score	Competition	Attendance	Ref.
May 1, 2010	Lockhart Stadium	1–1	D2 Pro League Regular Season	1,505	
June 22, 2010	Lockhart Stadium	2–1(aet)	U.S. Open Cup Second Round	972	
July 4, 2010	Steinbrenner Field	1–1	D2 Pro League Regular Season	5,123	
July 25, 2010	Steinbrenner Field	2–0	D2 Pro League Regular Season	3,226	
August 14, 2010	Lockhart Stadium	3–3	D2 Pro League Regular Season	1,855	
June 29, 2011	Lockhart Stadium	1–1	NASL Regular Season	5,848	
July 4, 2011	Al Lang Stadium	4–2	NASL Regular Season	4,248	
August 27, 2011	Lockhart Stadium	0–2	NASL Regular Season	3,685	
September 24, 2011	Al Lang Stadium	2–0	NASL Regular Season	3,226	
March 31, 2012	Lake Myrtle Sports Park	4–3	NASL Friendly		
April 28, 2012	Al Lang Stadium	3–1	NASL Regular Season	3,536	
June 2, 2012	Lockhart Stadium	3–1	NASL Regular Season	3,255	
July 4, 2012	Al Lang Stadium	3–1	NASL Regular Season	4,710	
September 1, 2012	Al Lang Stadium	0–3	NASL Regular Season	5,659	
April 27, 2013	Lockhart Stadium	1–2	NASL Regular Season	4,563	
July 4, 2013	Al Lang Stadium	4–0	NASL Regular Season	5,034	
October 5, 2013	Lockhart Stadium	2–1	NASL Regular Season	3,612	
October 12, 2013	Al Lang Stadium	2–1	NASL Regular Season	3,854	
May 24, 2014	Al Lang Stadium	3–2	NASL Regular Season	4,331	
July 4, 2014	Al Lang Stadium	3–1	NASL friendly	4,105	
August 2, 2014	Lockhart Stadium	1–0	NASL Regular Season	2,648	
October 8, 2014	Al Lang Stadium	2–3	NASL Regular Season	3,865	
May 16, 2015	Al Lang Stadium	1–0	NASL Regular Season	6,865	
July 25, 2015	Al Lang Stadium	1–3	NASL Regular Season	4,494	
August 15, 2015	Lockhart Stadium	2–1	NASL Regular Season	5,145	
April 30, 2016	Lockhart Stadium	0–1	NASL Regular Season	1,086	
August 6, 2016	Al Lang Stadium	2–1	NASL Regular Season	4,997	
September 24, 2016	Central Broward Stadium	1–4	NASL Regular Season	1,509	

Tampa Bay wins	Draws	Ft. Lauderdale wins
16	4	8

=== Florida Derby totals ===
==== All teams, all competitions ====
Tampa Bay Rowdies • Mutiny • FC Tampa Bay wins	Draws	Toros • Strikers • Sun • Fusion • Miami FC (2006) wins
64	6	45

==== Official matches ====
Tampa Bay Rowdies • Mutiny • FC Tampa Bay wins*	Draws	Toros • Strikers • Fusion • Miami FC (2006) wins
44*	4	39

*1978 playoff mini-game victory by Tampa Bay excluded from "official" totals because it was not a 90-minute match.

== See also ==
- Buccaneers–Dolphins rivalry
- Inter Miami CF–Orlando City SC rivalry
- Heat–Magic rivalry
- Lightning–Panthers rivalry
