= 6th Soccer Bowl =

The 6th Soccer Bowl may refer to:

- NASL Final 1974, the sixth championship game of the original North American Soccer League
- Soccer Bowl '80, the sixth championship game of the original North American Soccer League that used the "Soccer Bowl" moniker
- Soccer Bowl 2016, the sixth championship game of the second North American Soccer League
