= 1971 Washington Darts season =

Washington Darts
1971 season
- Chairman: William Cousins Jr.
- Manager: Norman Sutherland
- NASL: Southern Division: Third place
- Top goalscorer: League: (Trinidad and Tobago) Leroy DeLeon (8 goals); All: (Trinidad and Tobago) Leroy DeLeon (8 goals)
| Home colors | Away colors |

The 1971 Washington Darts season was the second season of the team in the North American Soccer League, and the club's fifth season in professional soccer. The team finished in third place of the Southern Division and did not qualify for the playoffs. At the end of the year, the club folded the team and moved to Miami, fielding a new team known as the Miami Gatos for the 1972 season.

== Competitions ==
=== NASL regular season ===
W = Wins, L = Losses, T= Ties, GF = Goals For, GA = Goals Against, PT= point system

6 points for a win, 3 points for a tie, 0 points for a loss, 1 point for each goal scored up to three per game.

| Northern Division | W | L | T | GF | GA | PT |
|---|---|---|---|---|---|---|
| Rochester Lancers | 13 | 5 | 6 | 48 | 31 | 141 |
| New York Cosmos | 9 | 10 | 5 | 51 | 55 | 117 |
| Toronto Metros | 5 | 10 | 9 | 32 | 47 | 89 |
| Montreal Olympique | 4 | 15 | 5 | 29 | 59 | 65 |

| Southern Division | W | L | T | GF | GA | PT |
|---|---|---|---|---|---|---|
| Atlanta Chiefs | 12 | 7 | 5 | 35 | 29 | 120 |
| Dallas Tornado | 10 | 6 | 8 | 38 | 24 | 119 |
| Washington Darts | 8 | 6 | 10 | 36 | 34 | 111 |
| St. Louis Stars | 6 | 13 | 5 | 37 | 47 | 86 |

== See also ==
1971 Washington Darts
