= Blas Sánchez =

Mexican footballer (born 1941)

Personal information
- Full name: Blas César Sánchez Orozco
- Date of birth: 3 February 1943
- Place of birth: Juanacatlán, Jalisco, Mexico
- Date of death: 26 October 1999 (aged 56)
- Place of death: Juanacatlán, Jalisco, Mexico
- Height: 1.73 m (5 ft 8 in)
- Position: Goalkeeper

Youth career
- 1958–1960: Atlas

Senior career*
| Years | Team | Apps | (Gls) |
| 1960–1961 | Petroleros de Salamanca | | |
| 1961–1968 | Irapuato | | |
| 1968–1972 | Laguna | | |
| 1972–1973 | UNAM Pumas | | |
| 1974 | Los Angeles Aztecs | 17 | (0) |
| 1975 | San Antonio Thunder | 4 | (0) |
| 1976–1978 | Juanacatlán | | |
- * Club domestic league appearances and goals

Blas César Sánchez Orozco (3 February 1943 – 26 October 1999) was a Mexican footballer. He played as a goalkeeper for Irapuato and Laguna throughout the 1960s and the early 1970s. He also played for the Los Angeles Aztecs and San Antonio Thunder within the North American Soccer League throughout the mid 1970s.

== Career ==
At the age of 15, Sánchez moved to Guadalajara to work at a factory near the training grounds of Atlas. One day, he was noticed by the Aurinegros and was signed to train within the youth sector after demonstrating his skills. However, his debut season saw him sign with Petroleros de Salamanca for the 1960–61 Mexican Segunda División. He then made his debut in the top-flight of Mexican football with Irapuato for the 1961–62 Mexican Primera División. He would remain with the club for around seven seasons, playing alongside other players such as Max Villalobos, Luis Cazaña, Jaime Belmonte, Mario Rey, Ligorio López, Alberto Etcheverry, Raúl "Pulga" Martínez, Carlos Miloc, Salvador Ruiz and Enrique Olivos. Throughout the late 1960s and the early 1970s, he played for Laguna where he formed the goalkeeper formation alongside Rubén Villalpando and Pablo Guerrero with the 1969–70 season seeing the arrival of Jaime Gómez. An infamous match occurred on 23 January 1972 against América during his final season with Laguna where the day prior, he had reportedly gotten drunk after partying all night and due to their other goalkeeper, Salvador Kuri being unavailable that day due to the weather, was forced to send Sánchez out to the field. Despite these claims being made by his teammate Héctor Veira, these claims had been exaggerated for the most part due to Sánchez performing a lot of saves to the point of earning praise from press at the time despite the match ending in a 2–0 defeat against the Cremas.

He then played for UNAM Pumas after the Universitarios agreed to swap their own goalkeeper, Francisco Castrejón for Sánchez where he played alongside other players such as Miguel Mejía Barón and Bora Milutinović.

Sánchez would then hold the honor of being one of the few Mexican players to play abroad in a foreign league at the time as he was then signed to the Los Angeles Aztecs for their 1974 season where he was part of the winning squad that defeated the Miami Toros 3–5 in penalties during the NASL Final 1974. He played one more season in the North American Soccer League with San Antonio Thunder before retiring from professional football and remained as an amateur player with Juanacatlán until 1978.

== Personal life ==
Blas' son, Carlos, recounted on how his father was the only player from Juanacatlán to be open about it rather than claim he was from El Salto.

Blas died on 26 October 1999 from a car accident. The sports ground in his home city of Juanacatlán is named after him.
