= Kip Jordan =

American soccer player

Personal information
- Full name: Stanley E. Jordan
- Place of birth: Rochester, New York, United States
- Position: Defender

Youth career
- 1986–1989: Cornell University

Senior career*
Years	Team	Apps	(Gls)
1974–1975	Miami Toros	13	(1)
1976	Rochester Lancers	10	(0)
1978	Buffalo Blazers		
- * Club domestic league appearances and goals

Stanley "Kip" Jordan was an American soccer defender who was a 1973 first team All American, then spent three seasons in the North American Soccer League (NASL).

Jordan first attended Bowling Green State University in 1970 and transferred to Monroe Community College for 1971 where he was recognized with National Junior College Athletic Association All-America first team selection. He then returned to senior college at Cornell University, playing on the men's soccer team from 1972 to 1973. He was a 1972 Honorable Mention (third team) and a 1973 first team All American. Jordan graduated in 1974 and was a member of the Quill and Dagger society. He was inducted with the inaugural class into Cornell's Athletic Hall of Fame in 1978. In 1974, Jordan signed with the Miami Toros of the North American Soccer League. He moved to the Rochester Lancers for the 1976 season. In 1978, he played in Canada's National Soccer League with the Buffalo Blazers.
