= Steve Baumann =

American soccer player (born 1952)

Personal information
- Full name: Stephen H. Baumann
- Date of birth: August 16, 1952 (age 74)
- Place of birth: Middletown, Ohio, U.S.
- Position: Forward

College career
Years	Team	Apps	(Gls)
1971–1973	Penn Quakers		

Senior career*
Years	Team	Apps	(Gls)
1974–1976	Miami Toros	43	(3)
1975–1976	Miami Toros (indoor)	2	(5)

Managerial career
- 1987–1992: Penn Quakers
- * Club domestic league appearances and goals

Steve Baumann (born August 16, 1952) is an American former soccer player and coach who played as a forward and the former Chief Executive of the National Soccer Hall of Fame. He was a first team All American at the University of Pennsylvania before playing three seasons in the North American Soccer League. He later coached the Penn soccer team for six seasons.

== Player ==
Baumann attended Staples High School in Westport, Connecticut where he was a two time All Conference high school soccer player. In 1967, Baumann's sophomore season, Staples won the state championship. In 1969 Staples again took the title, this time on a game winning header by Baumann. He graduated in 1970. He then attended the University of Pennsylvania, playing on the men's soccer team from 1971 to 1973. He holds the school's record for career points with 99 and career assists with 39. He was a 1973 first team All American. In 2005, he was named to the Penn All Century Team. In 1971, Baumann played one season with the Penn football team as a placekicker. He graduated with a bachelor's degree in elementary education and later earned a master's degree in science education at the University of Virginia. In 1973, the Miami Toros of the North American Soccer League selected Baumann in the first round of the NASL College Draft. He spent three seasons in Miami.

== Coach ==
After retiring from playing professionally, Baumann became an elementary school teacher in the Fairfax County Public School system where he taught from 1977 to 1987. During this time, he began coaching at the high school level first at Madison High School and then Robinson Secondary School where his team were state runners up in 1987. Baumann was also an instructor in science education and educational technology at George Mason University and Rosemont College. He then coached at the University of Pennsylvania from 1987 to 1993. He finished his six seasons with a 29–51–10 record.

== Executive ==
Baumann has held a number of executive positions including the Vice President of Education and Programs at the Liberty Science Center and the Director of Educational Technology Programs at The Franklin Institute Science Museum. In 2004, he became the executive director of the Kidspace Children's Museum in Pasadena, California. On May 11, 2007, Baumann became the President and Chief Operating Officer of the National Soccer Hall of Fame. He is married to Karen Baumann and has two children.
