= Weingart Stadium =

Stadium in Monterey Park, California

Coordinates: 34°2′34″N 118°9′6″W

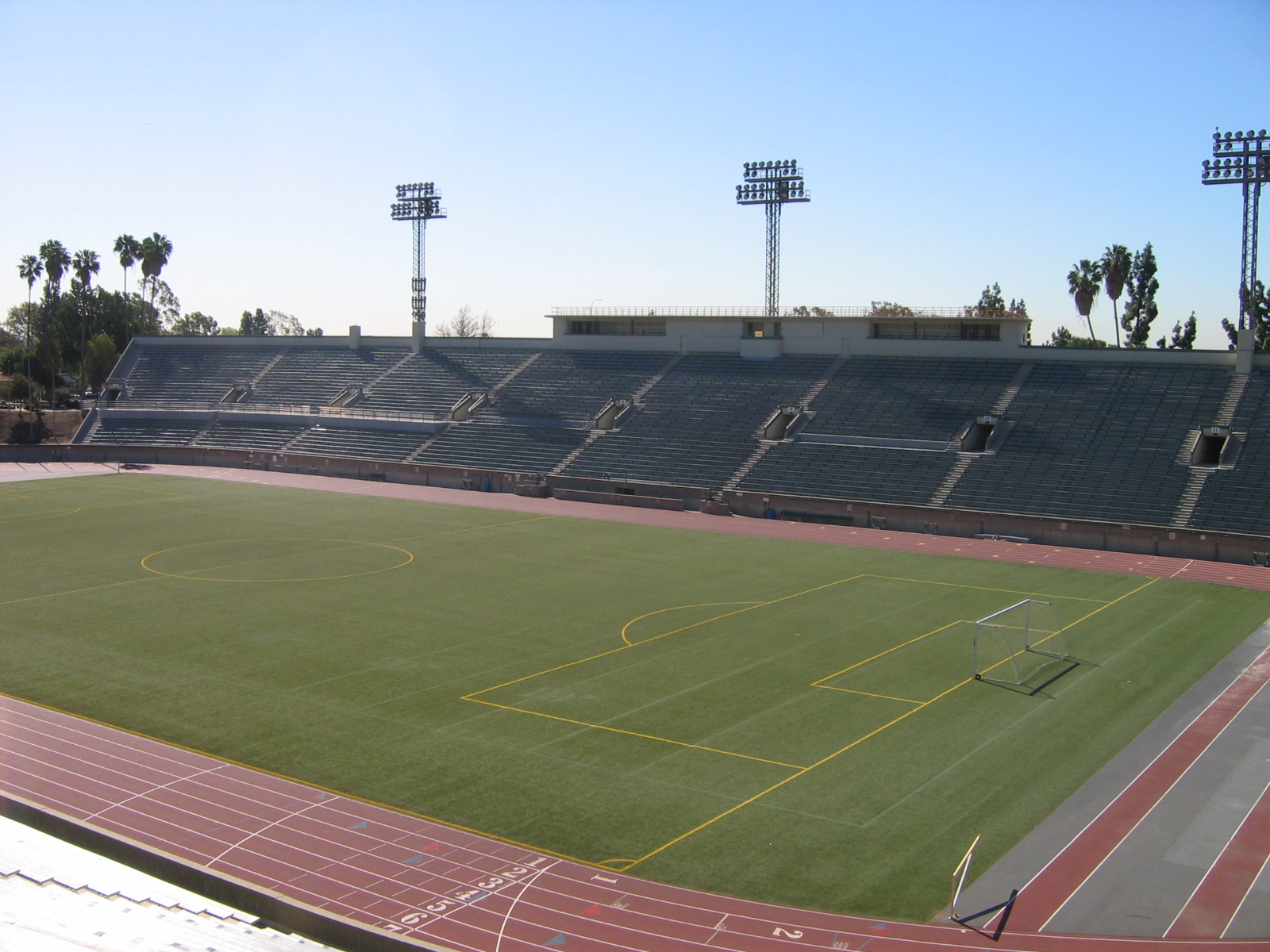
- Interactive map of Weingart Stadium
- Location: 1301 Avenida Cesar Chavez Monterey Park CA 91754 (on campus of East Los Angeles College)
- Owner: East Los Angeles College
- Capacity: 22,355

Construction
- Opened: 1951
- Cost: $3.1 million

Tenants
- East Los Angeles College (football, men's and women's soccer) (CCCAA) (1951–present); CSULA Diablos (1958–1961, 1970–1971); Los Angeles Aztecs (NASL) (1974); Olympic Field Hockey (IOC) (1984); Los Angeles Salsa (APSL) (1993–1994); East LA Classic (CIF)

Weingart Stadium (formerly East Los Angeles College Stadium or ELAC Stadium) is a 22,355-capacity multi-purpose stadium located at East Los Angeles College, in Monterey Park, California. It was built in 1951 at a cost of $3.1 million, and following renovations in 1984 it was renamed after philanthropist Ben Weingart.

== Sports ==
=== Football ===
Weingart is the home of the East Los Angeles College football team, but is probably best known as the site of the Garfield High School–Roosevelt High School football game. Also known as the East Los Angeles Classic, the annual clash has resulted in the stadium's largest crowds, numbering over 25,000.

=== Soccer ===
The ELAC men's and women's soccer teams have played here since the stadium was built in 1951.

The Los Angeles Aztecs of the old North American Soccer League played its first season at Weingart in 1974. The Aztecs won the Western Division with the league's best record, defeated the Boston Minutemen in the semifinals, 2-0, in front of 5,485 at ELAC, then won the NASL Final over the Miami Toros in Miami. The club would eventually move to larger stadia such as the Rose Bowl and the Los Angeles Memorial Coliseum, but never won another championship before folding after the 1981 season.

The Los Angeles Salsa of the APSL called Weingart home for some of their games in 1993-94. (The Salsa hosted the 1993 APSL Championship Game, but at Titan Stadium in Fullerton.) It is one of the few mid-size stadiums in the western United States retrofitted with a turf playing surface certified by the FIFA.

=== Field hockey ===
The stadium played host to all 1984 Olympic field hockey matches; the US women's team took home the bronze medal. Also, US Field Hockey played a home game here in 1990.

=== Other uses ===
Commencement ceremonies for local high schools such as Montebello High School, Schurr High School in Montebello, Garfield High School in East Los Angeles, and Bell Gardens High School in Bell Gardens, California are held at Weingart Stadium.

== Films ==
In Viva Knievel! it was used to simulate a stadium in Mexico were Evel Knievel did a motorcycle jump. A concert featuring Mexican music was used to draw a crowd in to fill the stadium for the shoot.

In Forrest Gump, special effects were used to turn the stadium into the University of Alabama's football stadium; using movie trickery, a small crowd at ELAC appears to fill the entire stadium.

A portion of the 2005 soccer movie Goal! was filmed at the stadium.

On October 19, 2013, during halftime of a game between ELAC and Victor Valley College, the stadium was used as the home field of Gotham City University for the film Batman v Superman: Dawn of Justice. The scene involved a football game between Gotham City University and rival Metropolis State University.

The stadium was used in the music video for the song "Wishes" by Baltimore dream pop band Beach House.
