= Esteban Aránguiz =

Chilean footballer

Personal information
- Full name: Esteban Wilfredo Aránguiz Sánchez
- Date of birth: 24 September 1948 (age 78)
- Place of birth: Santiago, Chile
- Height: 1.79 m (5 ft 10 1/2 in)
- Position: Midfielder

Youth career
- Defensor La Cisterna
- Universidad de Chile

Senior career*
Years	Team	Apps	(Gls)
1967–1973	Universidad de Chile	118	(16)
1973	San Luis Potosí		
1974–1975	Miami Toros		
1976–1982	Universidad de Chile	174	(4)
1983	Santiago Wanderers	3	(0)

International career
1967	Chile U20		
1970–1972	Chile	2	(0)
- * Club domestic league appearances and goals

Esteban Wilfredo Aránguiz Sánchez (born 24 September 1948) is a Chilean former football player who played as a midfielder for clubs in Chile, Mexico and the United States.

== Club career ==
As a child, Aránguiz was with Defensor La Cisterna before joining Universidad de Chile youth system. Considered a historical player of Universidad de Chile, having played for the club in several seasons, he also played abroad for the Mexican club San Luis Potosí and the American club Miami Toros.

His last club was Santiago Wanderers in 1983.

== International career ==
Aránguiz represented Chile at under-20 level in the 1967 South American Championship. At senior level, he made two appearances in two friendlies in 1970 and 1972.

== Personal life ==
He was nicknamed Toro (Bull) or Torito (Little Bull).
