= 1973 Miami Toros season =

Miami Toros
1973 season
- Manager: John Young
- Stadium: Miami Orange Bowl
- NASL: Eastern Division: third place
- Top goalscorer: League: (Trinidad and Tobago) Warren Archibald (12 goals); All: (Trinidad and Tobago) Warren Archibald (12 goals)
- Average home league attendance: 5,479
Home colors	Away colors

The 1973 Miami Toros season was the first season of the new team, and the club's seventh season in professional soccer. It is also the first ever incarnation of the club's new name. Previously, there were known as the Miami Gatos. This year, the team finished in third place in the Eastern Division. They did not make the North American Soccer League playoffs.

== Background ==
The team's new name was chosen by a 20-man committee.

== Regular season ==
W = Wins, L = Losses, T= Ties, GF = Goals For, GA = Goals Against, BP = Bonus Points, PTS= Total Points

POINT SYSTEM
6 points for a win, 3 points for a tie, 0 points for a loss, 1 bonus point for each goal scored up to three per game.

Eastern Division	W	L	T	GF	GA	BP	PTS
Philadelphia Atoms	9	2	8	29	14	26	104
New York Cosmos	7	5	7	31	23	28	91
Miami Toros	8	5	6	26	21	22	88

Northern Division	W	L	T	GF	GA	BP	PTS
Toronto Metros	6	4	9	32	18	26	89
Montreal Olympique	5	10	4	25	32	22	64
Rochester Lancers	4	9	6	17	27	17	59

Southern Division	W	L	T	GF	GA	BP	PTS
Dallas Tornado	11	4	4	36	25	33	111
St. Louis Stars	7	7	5	27	27	25	82
Atlanta Apollos	3	9	7	23	40	23	62
