= 1972 Miami Gatos season =

Miami Gatos
1972 season
- Manager: Sal DeRosa
- Stadium: Miami-Dade Stadium
- NASL: Eastern Division: fourth place
- Top goalscorer: League: Warren Archibald (6 goals); All: Warren Archibald (6 goals)
- Average home league attendance: 2,112
Home colors	Away colors

The 1972 Miami Gatos season was the first and only season of the new team, and the club's sixth season in professional soccer. It is also the first ever incarnation of the club's new name. Previously, they were known as the Washington Darts. This year, the team finished in fourth place in the Southern Division. They did not make the North American Soccer League playoffs. At the end of the year the club folded the team, relocated to a new stadium, rebranded themselves, and fielded a new team for the 1973 season called the Miami Toros.

== Review ==
Manager Sal DeRosa resigned in June.

== Competitions ==
=== NASL regular season ===
W = Wins, L = Losses, T= Ties, GF = Goals For, GA = Goals Against, PT= point system

6 points for a win, 3 points for a tie, 0 points for a loss, 1 point for each goal scored up to three per game.

Northern Division	W	L	T	GF	GA	PT
New York Cosmos	7	3	4	28	16	77
Rochester Lancers	6	5	3	20	22	64
Montreal Olympique	4	5	5	19	20	57
Toronto Metros	4	6	4	18	22	53

Southern Division	W	L	T	GF	GA	PT
St. Louis Stars	7	4	3	20	14	69
Dallas Tornado	6	5	3	15	12	60
Atlanta Chiefs	5	6	3	19	18	56
Miami Gatos	3	8	3	17	32	44

== See also ==
1972 Miami Gatos
