= Osvaldo Toriani =

Argentine footballer

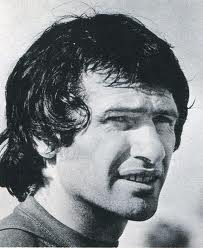
- Toriani in 1964

Personal information
- Full name: Osvaldo Reuben Toriani
- Date of birth: July 24, 1937
- Place of birth: Zárate, Buenos Aires, Argentina
- Date of death: September 24, 1988 (aged 51)
- Place of death: Buenos Aires, Argentina
- Position: Goalkeeper

Senior career*
Years	Team	Apps	(Gls)
1955–1957	Unión de Mar del Plata		
1958–1960	Club Atlético Tigre	34	(1)
1960–1966	Club Atlético Independiente	97	(0)
1967–1970	Newell's Old Boys	75	(0)
1971–1972	América de Cali		
1972	Toronto Italia		
1973	Independiente Medellín		
1974–1975	Miami Toros	34	(0)
1975	Miami Toros (indoor)	2	(0)
- * Club domestic league appearances and goals

Osvaldo Toriani (July 24, 1937 – September 24, 1988) was an Argentine footballer who played as a goalkeeper.

== Career ==
Toriani played with Unión de Mar del Plata in 1955. He played in the Argentine Primera División in 1958 with Club Atlético Tigre. The following season he played in the Primera Nacional with Tigre. In 1960, he played with Club Atlético Independiente, and assisted in securing the league title in 1960, and 1963. He also assisted Independiente in winning the 1964 Copa Libertadores, and 1965 Copa Libertadores. In 1967, he signed with Newell's Old Boys.

In 1971, he played abroad in Colombia's Categoría Primera A with América de Cali. In the summer of 1972 he played in the National Soccer League with Toronto Italia. During his tenure with Toronto he assisted in securing the NSL Championship. In 1973, he signed with Colombian rivals Independiente Medellín. He played in the North American Soccer League with Miami Toros. In his debut season with Miami he featured in the NASL Championship final against Los Angeles Aztecs, but lost the match in a penalty shoot-out. In total he played in 34 matches with Miami.

== Personal life and death ==
On September 24, 1988, he committed suicide by an overdose of barbiturates and inhaling carbon monoxide from a lit brazier.
