= Tony Douglas (footballer) =

Trinidad and Tobago footballer (born 1952)

Personal information
- Date of birth: August 16, 1952 (age 74)
- Place of birth: Point Fortin, Trinidad and Tobago
- Position: Forward

Senior career*
Years	Team	Apps	(Gls)
1974–1975	Los Angeles Aztecs	36	(10)
1976	San Jose Earthquakes	0	(0)
1976	→ Utah Golden Spikers (loan)	17	(7)
1977–1978	California Sunshine	41	(24)
1978–1979	Cleveland Force (indoor)	4	(1)
1980–1982	Maccabi Los Angeles	?	(?)

International career
	Trinidad & Tobago	7	(1)
Medal record
Men's football
Representing Trinidad and Tobago
CONCACAF Championship
Runner-up	1973 Haiti
- * Club domestic league appearances and goals

Anthony Douglas (born August 16, 1952) is a Trinidad and Tobago footballer professional footballer who played as a forward. He spent his professional career in the United States, playing in the North American Soccer League, American Soccer League and Major Indoor Soccer League. He earned seven caps, scoring one goal, with the Trinidad & Tobago national team.

== Career ==
Douglas was born in Point Fortin, Trinidad.

In 1974, Douglas signed with the Los Angeles Aztecs of the North American Soccer League. As the fifth shooter, he converted on the game-winning penalty kick for the Aztecs in the 1974 NASL Championship Final. There was a bit of controversy on the play, as he actually missed on his first attempt; the referee however granted him a re-kick after judging Miami goalkeeper Osvaldo Toriani to have come off his line early. In 1976, the Aztecs traded Douglas to the San Jose Earthquakes in exchange for Laurie Calloway. The Earthquakes then sent him on loan to the Utah Golden Spikers of the American Soccer League.

In 1977, he moved to the ASL's California Sunshine for two seasons, then, in the winter of 1978–79, played for the Cleveland Force of the Major Indoor Soccer League. In 1980, Douglas returned to outdoor soccer (and to Southern California) to play for Maccabi Los Angeles. Douglas played three seasons for Maccabi, leading them to the final of the National Challenge Cup each year from 1980 to 1982, winning the Cup in 1981. When Maccabi folded after the 1982 season, Douglas retired.

== Honours ==
Trinidad and Tobago

- CONCACAF Championship : Runner-up, 1973

== Awards ==
ASL All-Star: 1977
