= Luis Marotte =

Uruguayan footballer and coach (born 1944)

Personal information
- Date of birth: 14 October 1944 (age 82)
- Place of birth: Montevideo, Uruguay
- Position: Midfielder

Senior career*
Years	Team	Apps	(Gls)
1969	Toronto Hellas		
1970–1971	Rochester Lancers	24	(5)
1971–1972	Irapuato		
1973	Cincinnati Comets		
1974	Los Angeles Aztecs	19	(4)
1975	San Antonio Thunder	20	(2)
1976	Los Angeles Aztecs	6	(0)
1976	Oakland Buccaneers		

Managerial career
- 1980: United Armenians
- * Club domestic league appearances and goals

Luis Marotte (born October 14, 1944) is an Uruguayan former footballer who played as a midfielder.

== Career ==
Marotte played in the National Soccer League in 1969 with Toronto Hellas. The following season he played in the North American Soccer League with Rochester Lancers. In his debut season he assisted Rochester in securing the double (Northern Division & Soccer Bowl), and contributed a goal in the final series against Washington Darts. He re-signed with Rochester for the 1971 season, but failed to make an appearance due to contractual obligations with a Mexican club he played with. In 1972, he played in the Primera División de México with C.D. Irapuato.

In 1973, he played in the American Soccer League with Cincinnati Comets. In his debut season with Cincinnati he assisted in securing the Midwest Conference title, and featured in the ASL Championship final against New York Apollo. He returned to play in the NASL in 1974 to sign with Los Angeles Aztecs. During his tenure with Los Angeles he assisted in clinching the Western Division title, and winning the NASL Final against Miami Toros. He was also named to the NASL All-Star Second Team.

For the 1975 season he signed with San Antonio Thunder. After a single season in San Antonio he returned to play with Los Angeles Aztecs in 1976. Midway through the 1976 season he returned to the ASL to sign with Oakland Buccaneers. In 1977, he played in the Greater Los Angeles Soccer League with United Armenians.

== Managerial career ==
Marotte was the head coach for the United Armenians in the Greater Los Angeles Soccer League in 1980.
