= Luis Holmanza =

Cuban footballer

Personal information
- Full name: Luis María Holmanza Odelín
- Date of birth: 12 September 1949 (age 77)
- Height: 1.75 m (5 ft 9 in)
- Position: Defender

Senior career*
Years	Team	Apps	(Gls)
- FC Industriales
- * Club domestic league appearances and goals

Luis María Holmanza Odelín (born 12 September 1949) is a Cuban former footballer who competed in the 1976 Summer Olympics.

== International career ==
He represented his country in four FIFA World Cup qualifying matches and played two games at the 1976 Summer Olympics.
