= Victor Gamaldo =

Trinidad and Tobago footballer

Personal information
- Date of birth: 22 January 1944 (age 82)
- Position: Midfielder

Senior career*
Years	Team	Apps	(Gls)
1968–1969	Washington Darts (ASL)		
1970–1971	Washington Darts (NASL)	46	(1)
1972–1973	Baltimore Bays		
1974	Baltimore Comets	18	
1975	Baltimore Comets (indoor)		

International career
	Trinidad and Tobago	3	(0)
- * Club domestic league appearances and goals

Victor Gamaldo (born 22 January 1944) is a Trinidad and Tobago former footballer. He played four seasons for the Washington Darts in both the American Soccer League and North American Soccer League. He later played for the Baltimore Bays of the ASL and the Baltimore Comets of the NASL. He also made three appearances for the Trinidad and Tobago national football team.
