= Kim Yong-ha =

North Korean football manager

Kim Yong-ha was a North Korean football manager.

He was appointed as the Head coach of the Cuba national football team for the 1970 Central American and Caribbean Games and the 1971 Pan American Games tournament.

Kim Yong-ha was also the trainer of the Cuba national team during their tour of Vietnam in 1970.

== Achievements ==
- Central American and Caribbean Games: Gold (1970)
- Pan American Games: Bronze (1971)
