= Alan Hamlyn =

English-American soccer player

Personal information
- Date of birth: 5 January 1947 (age 79)
- Place of birth: London, England
- Position: Defender

Senior career*
Years	Team	Apps	(Gls)
1966–1967	Cobham		
1971–1973	Atlanta Chiefs	25	(1)
1974–1976	Miami Toros	41	(0)
1977–1978	Fort Lauderdale Strikers	14	(0)
1978–1979	Cleveland Force (indoor)	23	(6)

International career
1972–1975	United States	4	(0)
- * Club domestic league appearances and goals

Alan Hamlyn is an English retired-American soccer defender. He began his career in England before playing eight seasons in the North American Soccer League. He also earned four caps with the U.S. national team between 1972 and 1975.

== National team ==
After gaining his U.S. citizenship, Hamlyn earned four caps with the U.S. national team between 1972 and 1975. In 1972, he played in three World Cup qualifiers. The first was a 20 August 1972 loss to Canada. That was followed in the next two weeks with a 2–2 tie with Canada and a loss to Mexico. Hamlyn did not play with the national team again until a 7–0 loss to Poland on 26 March 1975. A month later, he played in a 10–0 loss to Italy, but this was not an official national team game.

== Early life ==
Hamlyn was drafted into the United States Army and served in Vietnam during the Vietnam War, where he received the Bronze Star Medal with "V" Purple Heart Air medal. Prior to coming to USA he was a highly ranked sprinter in England getting a 3rd place medal in Great Britain Track and Field championship 4×110 relay.
