= Roger Verdi =

English footballer (born 1953)

Personal information
- Full name: Rajinder Singh Virdee
- Date of birth: 4 February 1953 (age 73)
- Place of birth: Nairobi, Kenya
- Height: 5 ft 10 in (1.78 m)
- Position: Defender

Youth career
- Wolverhampton Wanderers
- Ipswich Town

Senior career*
Years	Team	Apps	(Gls)
1972	Vancouver Spartans	25	(1)
1972–1973	Montreal Olympique	25	(1)
1974	Miami Toros	10	(0)
1975–1977	St. Louis Stars		(0)
1978	San Jose Earthquakes	9	(0)
1979	Cleveland Cobras		
1979	Columbus Magic		
1980	Phoenix Fire	0	(0)
1980–1981	Phoenix Inferno	38	(2)
Total		141+	(3+)
- * Club domestic league appearances and goals

Roger Verdi (born Rajinder Singh Virdee on 4 February 1953) is an English retired professional footballer who spent his entire career in North America, making over 100 league appearances in the North American Soccer League.

== Early life ==
Verdi was born on 4 February 1953, as Rajinder Singh Virdee in Nairobi, Kenya, to Indian Sikh parents. He was the youngest of their two sons. The family moved to England when Verdi was aged seven, settling in Smethwick. He attended Sandwell Boys school.

Verdi changed his name due to racism. He went by 'Roger Jones' and 'Roger Jones Verdi' before settling on 'Roger Verdi'.

== Career ==
=== England ===
Verdi played with the youth teams of both Wolverhampton Wanderers and Ipswich Town, but failing to get a professional contract with either team, moved to North America.

=== North America ===
Verdi began his career in Canada with the Vancouver Spartans.

Verdi played in the NASL between 1972 and 1978 for the Montreal Olympique, Miami Toros, St. Louis Stars and San Jose Earthquakes, making a total of 103 league appearances. He later played in the ASL for the Cleveland Cobras, Columbus Magic, and the Phoenix Fire, and in the MISL for Phoenix Inferno.

=== Coaching career ===
After his playing career ended he moved into coaching, holding assistant coaching positions with Athlone Town FC, Stockport County, Phoenix Inferno and Cleveland Cobras. Other coaching positions include Co-director for Hubert Vogelsinger Soccer Academy in Texas, Connecticut and California and has been the Technical Director for youth clubs in Washington, New Mexico. He joined DFW Tornados as a coach in 2010.

He is also the owner of the Roger Verdi International Soccer Academy.

== Later life ==
Verdi retired to Dallas, Texas, working in construction.

== See also ==
- List of Sikh footballers
