= Ken Mallender =

English footballer

Personal information
- Full name: Kenneth Mallender
- Date of birth: 10 December 1942 (age 83)
- Place of birth: Thrybergh, South Yorkshire, England
- Position: Defender

Senior career*
Years	Team	Apps	(Gls)
1961–1968	Sheffield United	143	(2)
1968–1972	Norwich City	46	(1)
1972–1974	Hereford United	72	(1)
1974	Miami Toros	17	(0)
- Telford United
Total		278+	(4+)

Managerial career
- Telford United (player manager)
- * Club domestic league appearances and goals

Kenneth Mallender (born 10 December 1943) is an English retired footballer who played during the 1960s and early 1970s. He played as a left-sided defender.

Born in Thrybergh, South Yorkshire on 10 December 1943, Mallender began his senior career in 1961 at Sheffield United where he remained until his move to Norwich City in the autumn of 1968. After a decade playing in the First and Second Divisions, Mallender dropped down into non-league football to play for Hereford United; one of the leading clubs in the Southern League. In doing so, he went part-time and secured a full-time job as a sales representative for Cadbury.

Mallender's first season at Edgar Street saw him play in 72 out of 79 first team matches that season, including every match of Hereford's famous cup run. In a second replay against Northampton Town, Mallender scored the most important goal of his career; an injury time equaliser which kept the cup run alive.

In the 1973–74 season, Mallender scored his fourth and final Football League goal, in his last season for Hereford. In 1974, he moved to the North American Soccer League to play for the Miami Toros. He played 17 matches and scored in the penalty shoot-out as Miami lost to the Los Angeles Aztecs in the championship play-off. He later moved to Telford United where he ended his playing career; he was the player-manager at Telford United as recently as the 1984–85 FA Cup. He later worked for Nike and settled in Hereford.
