= Leroy DeLeon =

Trinidad and Tobago footballer (1948–2025)

Personal information
- Date of birth: 7 February 1948
- Place of birth: Port of Spain, Trinidad and Tobago
- Date of death: 28 January 2025 (aged 76)
- Place of death: San Fernando, Trinidad and Tobago
- Height: 5 ft 10 in (1.78 m)
- Position: Striker

Senior career*
Years	Team	Apps	(Gls)
1967–1968	New York Generals	15	(3)
1969	Washington Darts (ASL)		
1970–1971	Washington Darts	44	(23)
1970	Philadelphia Ukrainian Nationals		
1971	Washington Darts (indoor)	2	(0)
1972–1973	Miami Gatos		
1974–1977	Washington Diplomats	50	(18)
1975–1976	Washington Diplomats (indoor)	4	(2)
1977–1978	San Jose Earthquakes	30	(6)
1979	Seattle Sounders	1	(0)
1979–1980	Detroit Lightning (indoor)	1	(0)
1980–1983	Phoenix Inferno (indoor)	122	(73)

International career
	Trinidad and Tobago	17	
- * Club domestic league appearances and goals

Leroy DeLeon (7 February 1948 – 28 January 2025) was a Trinidad and Tobago professional footballer who played as a striker in several leagues in he United States.

== Club career ==
Born in Port of Spain, DeLeon graduated from Saint Benedict's College. He played for their college team alongside Warren Archibald and Jan Steadman.

He played for the New York Generals, the Washington Darts, the Philadelphia Ukrainian Nationals, the Miami Gatos, the Washington Diplomats, the Washington Diplomats, the San Jose Earthquakes, the Seattle Sounders, the Detroit Lightning, and the Phoenix Inferno.

He did not feature for the Miami Gatos in the 1973 season, and in May 1974 he was traded to the Washington Diplomats, for cash and the Diplomats' 1974 first round draft choice.

In April 1977, the Diplomats traded DeLeon to the San Jose Earthquakes in exchange for Mark Liveric.

== International career ==
He also played at international level for Trinidad and Tobago, making his debut aged 16 and earning 17 caps.

== Later life and death ==
In 2008 he was inducted into the Trinidad and Tobago Sports Hall of Fame. After suffering strokes in December 2024, DeLeon died in San Fernando on 28 January 2025, at the age of 76.
