= Doug McMillan =

Scottish-American soccer player

Personal information
- Full name: Douglas McMillan
- Date of birth: October 14, 1944 (age 82)
- Place of birth: Dundee, Scotland
- Position: Forward

Senior career*
| Years | Team | Apps | (Gls) |
| 1973 | Cleveland Stars | 7 | (11) |
| 1974–1976 | Los Angeles Aztecs | 35 | (11) |
| 1976–1978 | Los Angeles Skyhawks | | |

International career
| 1974 | United States | 2 | (0) |

Managerial career
- 1978: Los Angeles Skyhawks
- 1996–2002: Life University (assistant)
- * Club domestic league appearances and goals

Douglas McMillan is a former Scottish-American soccer forward. He was both the 1973 American Soccer League Rookie of the Year and the 1974 North American Soccer League Rookie of the Year. He earned two caps with the United States national team in 1974.

== Player ==
=== Professional ===
Born in Scotland, McMillan joined the Cleveland Stars of the American Soccer League (ASL) in 1973. That season, he scored eleven goals and added seven assists in seven games to place second in the league's points list. This earned him Rookie of the Year honors, the first Rookie of the Year to be named by the ASL. In 1974, he jumped to the expansion Los Angeles Aztecs of the North American Soccer League (NASL). He duplicated his scoring exploits, taking third in the NASL points list with ten goals and ten assists in twenty games. He was again named league Rookie of the Year, making him the only player to earn that honor in two U.S. leagues. Although an expansion team, the Aztecs went to the championship game where McMillan tied the game 3–3 with only a few minutes remaining to take the game into overtime. The Aztecs eventually won in penalty kicks. In addition to his Rookie of the Year honors, he was a second team All Star. McMillan played two more seasons in Los Angeles, being released in 1976. He then signed with the Los Angeles Skyhawks of the ASL where he played until 1978.

=== National team ===
McMillan earned two caps with the U.S. national team in 1974. Both were 4-0 losses in March 1974. The first loss came at the hands of Bermuda on March 17 and the second was a loss to Poland three days later.

== Coach ==
In 1978, McMillan was hired as the head coach of the American Soccer League Los Angeles Skyhawks. He took his team to the championship game where the Skyhawks lost 1–0 to the New York Apollo. McMillan has continued to coach in various capacities. In 1986, he opened Camp North American Soccer Academy in Commerce, Georgia. He was also the assistant soccer coach at Life University from 1996 through at least 2002.

== See also ==
- List of United States men's international soccer players born outside the United States
