= Uruguay Graffigna =

Uruguayan footballer (1948–2021)

Personal information
- Full name: Uruguay Gustavo Graffigna Banhoffer
- Date of birth: 14 January 1948
- Place of birth: Montevideo, Uruguay
- Date of death: 12 March 2021 (aged 73)
- Place of death: Quillota, Chile
- Height: 1.80 m (5 ft 11 in)
- Position: Forward

Senior career*
| Years | Team | Apps | (Gls) |
| 1966–1967 | El Tanque Sisley | | |
| 1968–1970 | San Luis | | |
| 1971 | Unión San Felipe | 34 | (14) |
| 1972 | Unión Española | 19 | (5) |
| 1973 | Pachuca | | |
| 1973 | Atlético Español | | |
| 1974 | Aviación | | |
| 1974–1975 | Los Angeles Aztecs | 38 | (21) |
| 1975–1979 | PEC Zwolle | 24 | (3) |
| 1979 | Santiago Morning | | |
| 1980–1983 | San Luis | | |
| 1984 | Iberia | | |
- * Club domestic league appearances and goals

Uruguay Gustavo Graffigna Banhoffer, also known as Uri Banhoffer or Yuri Banhoffer (14 January 1948 – 12 March 2021), was a Uruguayan footballer who played for clubs in Uruguay, Chile, the Netherlands and the United States.

He died from COVID-19 during the COVID-19 pandemic in Chile, and Alzheimer's disease.

== Career ==
Born in Montevideo, Uruguay, Graffigna moved to Chile in 1968 after playing for Defensor Sporting in his homeland. He helped Unión San Felipe win the 1971 Primera División title and after a spell with Antofagasta, he moved to Mexico to play for C.F. Pachuca.

Graffigna played two seasons in the NASL for the Los Angeles Aztecs and won the championship in 1974. He next moved to the Netherlands where he joined Eerste Divisie club PEC Zwolle. Graffigna spent three seasons with PEC, and had a goal disallowed as the club lost the 1976–77 KNVB Cup final to FC Twente. In 1978 he clinched promotion to the Eredivisie, the Netherland's top level, after winning the Eerste Divisie league title. He left for Chile in 1979 after his father died there and to be close to his mother.

== Personal life ==
Graffigna naturalized Chilean in 2015, keeping the Uruguayan nationality.

In 1968, he came to Chile to join Unión La Calera where his older brother, Pedro Graffigna, played since 1966.

He lived in Quillota, Chile.
