= Roberto Aguirre (footballer) =

Argentine footballer (born 1942)

Personal information
- Full name: Roberto Rodolfo Aguirre
- Date of birth: 10 February 1942 (age 84)
- Place of birth: Buenos Aires, Argentina
- Positions: Defender; midfielder

Senior career*
Years	Team	Apps	(Gls)
1960–1965	Quilmes	130	(6)
1965–1966	Newell's Old Boys	135	(6)
1967–1969	Racing Club	49	(5)
1969–1972	Banfield	24	(2)
1972	Miami Gatos	13	(3)
1973–1976	Miami Toros	77	(6)
1977–1978	Fort Lauderdale Strikers	24	(1)

International career
1968–1969	Argentina	8	(0)
- * Club domestic league appearances and goals

Roberto Aguirre (born 10 February 1942) is an Argentine former professional footballer.

== Club career ==
Aguirre started his playing career in Argentina with Quilmes where he played 130 games between 1960 and 1965. He also played for Banfield, Newell's Old Boys and Racing Club, before moving to the United States in 1972, where he played in the NASL between 1972 and 1978 for the Miami Gatos, Miami Toros and Fort Lauderdale Strikers.

== International career ==
Aguirre played 8 times for the Argentina national team between 1968 and 1969.
