= Renato Costa =

Brazilian footballer

Personal information
- Full name: Raul Renato Herrera Costa
- Date of birth: February 12, 1948 (age 78)
- Place of birth: Bahia, Brazil
- Height: 5 ft 10 in (1.78 m)
- Position: Midfielder

Senior career*
Years	Team	Apps	(Gls)
1969	Toronto Hellas		
1970	Rochester Lancers	21	(8)
1973	Rochester Lancers	2	(0)
1974	Los Angeles Aztecs	16	(3)
1975–1976	San Antonio Thunder	14	(2)
Total		53	(13)
- * Club domestic league appearances and goals

Raul Renato Herrera Costa (born February 12, 1948), commonly known as Renato Costa or Renato Herrera, is a former Brazilian soccer player who played in the NASL. In 1969, he played in the National Soccer League with Toronto Hellas. In 1977, he was named to the Rochester Lancers Team of the Decade.

== Career statistics ==
=== Club ===
Club	Season	League			Cup		Other		Total	
Club	Season	Division	Apps	Goals	Apps	Goals	Apps	Goals	Apps	Goals
Rochester Lancers	1970	NASL	21	8	0	0	0	0	21	8
Rochester Lancers	1973	NASL	2	0	0	0	0	0	2	0
Rochester Lancers	Total		23	8	0	0	0	0	23	8
Los Angeles Aztecs	1974	NASL	16	3	0	0	0	0	16	3
San Antonio Thunder	1975	NASL	14	2	0	0	0	0	14	2
San Antonio Thunder	1976	NASL	0	0	0	0	0	0	0	0
Career total			53	13	0	0	0	0	53	13
