= Ramon Moraldo =

Trinidad and Tobago footballer

Personal information
- Date of birth: July 18, 1951
- Place of birth: Fyzabad, Trinidad and Tobago
- Position: Defender

Senior career*
Years	Team	Apps	(Gls)
1969–1971	Texaco		
1971–1973	Forest Reserve		
1974	Point Fortin Civic F.C.		
1974–1976	Los Angeles Aztecs	55	(2)
1977–1980	California Sunshine		

International career
	Trinidad & Tobago	9	(0)
Medal record
Men's football
Representing Trinidad and Tobago
CONCACAF Championship
Runner-up	1973 Haiti
- * Club domestic league appearances and goals

Ramon Moraldo (born July 18, 1951, in Fyzabad) is a retired Trinidad and Tobago football (soccer) defender. He played as a defender.

== Honours ==
Trinidad and Tobago

- CONCACAF Championship : Runner-up, 1973

== Awards ==
- ASL All-Star Team selection - 1979
