= Ralph Wright (footballer) =

English footballer (1947–2020)

Personal information
- Date of birth: 3 August 1947
- Place of birth: Newcastle, England
- Date of death: 7 June 2020 (aged 72)
- Positions: Defender; midfielder

Senior career*
Years	Team	Apps	(Gls)
- Spennymoor United
1968–1969	Norwich City	0	(0)
1969–1970	Bradford Park Avenue	14	(1)
1970–1971	Hartlepool United	24	(3)
1971–1972	Stockport County	21	(0)
1972–1973	Bolton Wanderers	32	(5)
1972	→ Southport (loan)	6	(1)
1973	New York Cosmos	17	(1)
1973–1974	Southport	37	(2)
1974–1976	Miami Toros	52	(5)
1976	Dallas Tornado	5	(0)
- Spennymoor United
Total		208	(18)
- * Club domestic league appearances and goals

Ralph Wright (3 August 1947 – 7 June 2020) was an English professional footballer who played as a defender and midfielder. Active in England and the United States, Wright made over 200 appearances in an 8-year career.

== Career ==
Born in Newcastle, Wright played professionally in England and the United States for Spennymoor United, Norwich City, Bradford Park Avenue, Hartlepool United, Stockport County, Bolton Wanderers, Southport, the New York Cosmos, the Miami Toros and the Dallas Tornado.

Wright died on 7 June 2020.
