= Tamiami Park =

Public park in Miami, Florida, United States

- Interactive map of Tamiami Park
- Type: Municipal
- Location: Miami, Miami-Dade County, Florida, United States
- Coordinates: 25°44′59″N 80°22′45″W
- Operator: Miami-Dade County Parks and Recreation Department

Tamiami Park is a public urban park in metropolitan Miami, just south of the Modesto Maidique campus of Florida International University.

== Background ==
The park was built in the late 1960s on the site of the former Tamiami Airport, which was rebuilt as a larger airport south in Kendall. Growth of the surrounding area and the nearby flight path for Miami International Airport forced the relocation of the municipal airport.

The Fair Expo Center, site of the Miami-Dade County Fair & Exposition, is located on the eastern side of the park. A swimming pool was built in the mid-1970s equipped with state-of-the-art solar panels to heat the water. Pope John Paul II held an open-air mass for 150,000 people in September 1987. Tamiami Stadium (sometimes called Tamiami Field) was located in the park until 1995, when FIU Stadium was built on the south end of the campus. The Miami Toros of the North American Soccer League played there during the 1976 season. The Toros also used the field for one playoff game in 1974.

=== Auto racing ===
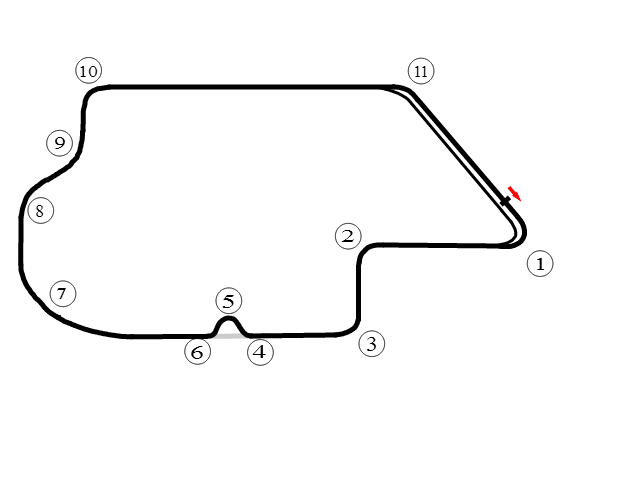
map of the street circuit layout

A CART series race was held at the facility from 1985 to 1988. (See Grand Prix of Miami).
