= Ronnie Sharp (footballer) =

Scottish footballer (born 1948)

Personal information
- Full name: Ronald Sharp
- Date of birth: 30 January 1948 (age 78)
- Place of birth: Scotland
- Position: Winger

Senior career*
Years	Team	Apps	(Gls)
1968–1973	Cowdenbeath	47	(12)
1973	Miami Toros	19	(1)
1973–1974	San Luis	3	(0)
1974–1976	Miami Toros	53	(4)
1977	Fort Lauderdale Strikers	1	(0)
- * Club domestic league appearances and goals

Ronnie Sharp (born 30 January 1948) is a Scottish footballer who played in the North American Soccer League and Mexican Primera División.

== Career ==
Born on 30 January 1948, in Scotland, Sharp began his football career with junior side Glenrothes. The winger played part-time with Scottish Second Division side Cowdenbeath from 1968 to 1973. Miami Toros' coach John Young scouted Sharp on a trip to Scotland, and he joined the NASL club in 1973. During the off-season, Sharp and teammates Warren Archibald and Steve David joined Mexican side San Luis for five weeks of the 1973–74 Mexican Primera División season.

Sharp returned to the Miami Toros for three more seasons before finishing his career with the Fort Lauderdale Strikers in 1977. He was named to the 1975 NASL All-Star team.

Sharp owned the Fort Lauderdale Sun of the United Soccer League in 1984, but was forced to sell the team shortly after winning the USL championship, because of his involvement in a Texas marijuana smuggling operation. In September 1984, he testified as a witness for the U.S. government, as part of a plea deal. Sworn testimony indicated that Sharp was more likely a middle-man than an active participant in the operation.
