= Miami Toros =

Defunct American soccer club

Miami Toros (1973–76)
- Full name: Miami Gatos / Miami Toros
- Founded: (Previously Washington Darts); 1972 Miami Gatos; 1973 Miami Toros
- Dissolved: 1976 (rebranded Fort Lauderdale Strikers)
- Stadium: Miami-Dade North Stadium (1972), Miami Orange Bowl (1973–1975), Tamiami Field (1974, 1976); Miami, Florida
- Chairman: John Bilotta (1972–1973); Joe Robbie (1973–1976)
- League: NASL
Home colors	Away colors

The Miami Toros were a professional soccer team in the North American Soccer League from 1972 to 1976. The club was founded in 1967 as the Washington Darts, and moved to Miami, where they played the 1972 season in the NASL's Southern Division as the Miami Gatos. In 1973, the club rebranded as the Miami Toros. Their home field was at times the Miami Orange Bowl, Tamiami Field and Miami Dade College's North Campus Stadium.

After the 1976 season, the team moved to Fort Lauderdale and became known as the Fort Lauderdale Strikers and later moved to Minnesota and became known as the Minnesota Strikers.

Prominent players included 1973 league MVP Warren Archibald who was from Point Fortin, the smallest borough in Trinidad and Tobago, and 1975 league MVP Juan Carlos Moramarco who was from Rosario, Argentina.

Beginning in 1975, the Toros had a rivalry with the Tampa Bay Rowdies that grew even fiercer after the Toros moved to Ft. Lauderdale and became the Strikers.

== Year-by-year ==
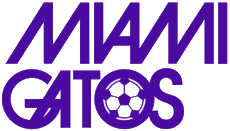
Logo of the "Miami Gatos", used in 1972

Year	League	W	L	T	Pts	Reg. season	Playoffs	Attendance
1972	NASL	3	8	3	44	4th, Southern Division	did not qualify	2,112
1973	NASL	8	5	6	88	3rd, Eastern Division	did not qualify	5,479
1974	NASL	9	5	6	107	1st, Eastern Division	Won Semifinal (Dallas); Lost Championship (Los Angeles Aztecs)	7,340
1975	NASL indoor	2	0	—	4	2nd, Region 3	did not qualify	N/A
1975	NASL	14	8	—	123	2nd, Eastern Division	Won Quarterfinal (Boston); Lost Semifinal (Tampa Bay)	4,921
1976	NASL indoor	1	1	—	2	3rd, Eastern Regional	did not qualify	N/A
1976	NASL	6	18	—	63	4th, Atlantic Conference, Eastern Division	did not qualify	3,070

== Honors ==
NASL championships
- 1974 runner-up

Division titles

- 1974 Eastern Division

League MVP

- 1973 Warren Archibald
- 1975 Steve David

League scoring champion

- 1975 Steve David (23 goals, 6 assists, 52 points)

League goal scoring champion

- 1973 Warren Archibald (12 goals)
- 1975 Steve David (23 goals)

Coach of the Year

- 1974 John Young

All-Star first team selections

- 1972 Willie Evans
- 1973 Warren Archibald, David Sadler
- 1974 Roberto Aguirre, Ronnie Sharp
- 1975 Steve David, Ronnie Sharp

All-Star second team selections

- 1972 Dave Metchick
- 1973 Roberto Aguirre
- 1974 Warren Archibald, Ralph Wright
- 1975 Ralph Wright

All-Star honorable mentions

- 1972 Warren Archibald, Billy Fraser
- 1974 Steve David
- 1976 Jim Holton

U.S. Soccer Hall of Fame

- 2003 Ace Ntsoelengoe, Joe & Elizabeth Robbie

== Head coaches ==
- (United States) Sal DeRosa (1972)
- (Scotland) John Young (1973–1975)
- (United States) Dr. Greg Myers (1975–1976)
- (England) Ken Furphy (1976)

== Owners/GMs ==
- (Cyprus) Garo Yepremian (1972)
- (United States) John Bilotta (1971–72)
- (United States) Joe Robbie (1973–76)
- (United States) Angel Lorie, Jr. (Managing Partner) (1972–75)
- (United States) Elizabeth Robbie (Managing Partner) (1976)
