= List of U.S. Open Cup finals =

The U.S. Open Cup is an American soccer competition open to all United States Soccer Federation affiliated teams, from amateur adult club teams to the professional clubs of Major League Soccer, the country's top-flight league. The tournament was first contested in 1913–14 and continued uninterrupted until a two-year pause in 2020 and 2021 due to the COVID-19 pandemic. It is the oldest still-running annual sports tournament in the United States.

With five titles each, Bethlehem Steel of Bethlehem, Pennsylvania and Maccabee Los Angeles have won the domestic cup more times than any other American soccer club. In a joint tie for third, the Chicago Fire, Fall River F.C., Greek American Atlas, Philadelphia Ukrainians, Seattle Sounders FC, and Sporting Kansas City have won the title four times.

In the cup's 105-year history, 64 different clubs have won the tournament. As of 2026, teams from 19 states have won the U.S. Open Cup. The winner qualifies for a berth in the CONCACAF Champions Cup, the premier club competition for North America, Central America, and the Caribbean.

== History ==
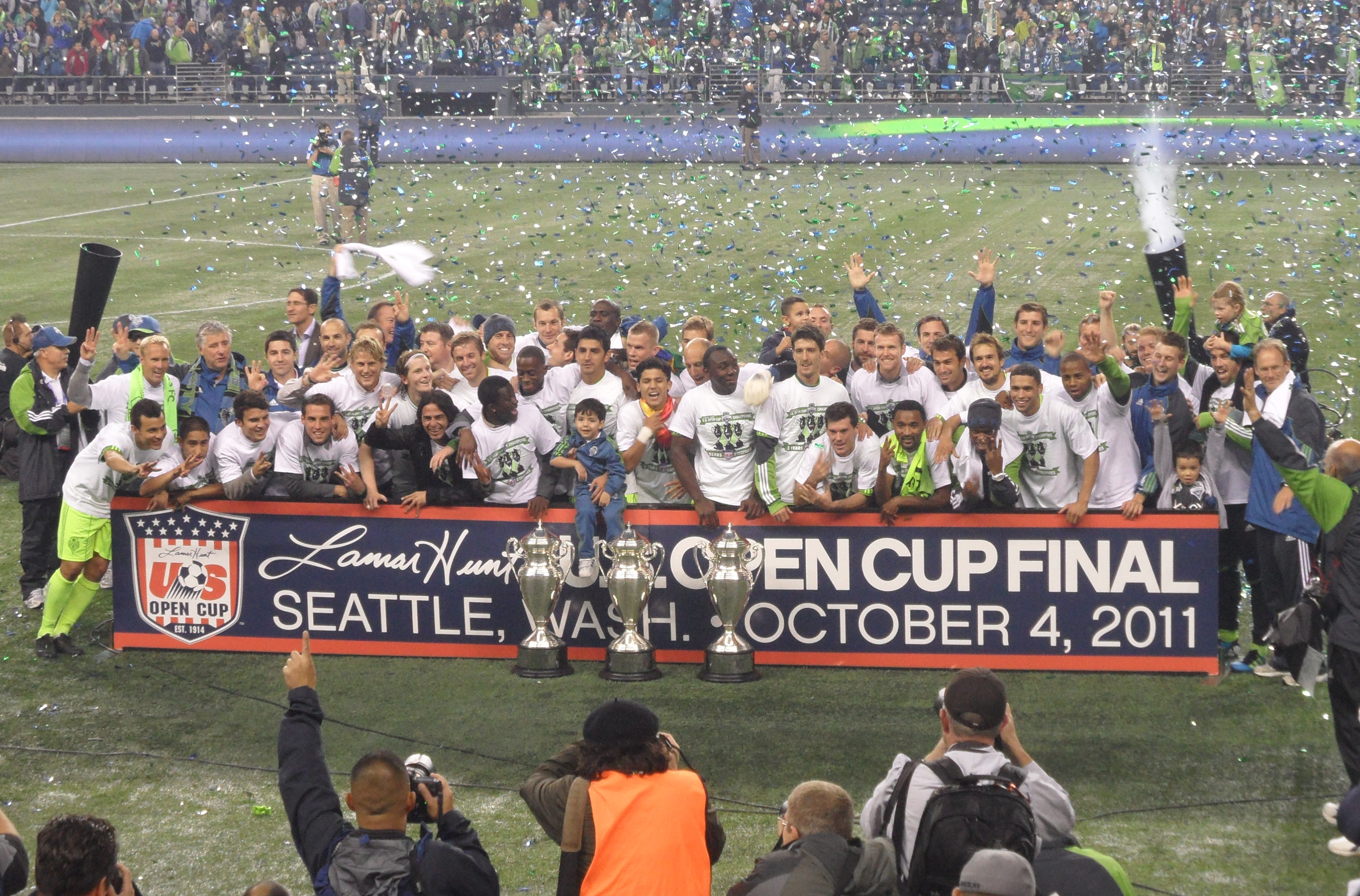
The Seattle Sounders FC after winning the 2011 U.S. Open Cup. The crowd of 35,311 is the second largest ever in Open Cup history

The competition dates back to 1914, when it was known as the National Challenge Cup. Prior to the National was the American Football Association's American Cup. Due to internal conflicts within the AFA regarding the process of allowing teams to enter, a new association called the American Amateur Football Association was created. Formed in October 1911, the association quickly spread outside of the Northeast and created its own cup in 1912, the American Amateur Football Association Cup. That year, both the AFA and AAFA applied for membership in FIFA, the international governing body for soccer. In 1913, the AAFA gained an edge over the AFA when several AFA organizations moved to the AAFA. On April 5, 1913, the AAFA reorganized as the United States Football Association, presently known as the United States Soccer Federation. FIFA quickly granted a provisional membership, and USFA began exerting its influence on the sport. This influence led to the establishment of the National Challenge Cup that fall. The National Challenge Cup quickly grew to overshadow the American Cup. However, both cups were played simultaneously for the next ten years. Declining respect for the AFA led to the withdrawal of several associations from its cup in 1917. Further competition came in 1924 when USFA created the National Amateur Cup. That move spelled the death knell for the American Cup. It played its last season in 1924.

=== MLS era ===
The U.S. Open Cup has been dominated by MLS teams since that league began play in 1996. The last non-MLS team to win the cup were the Rochester Rhinos in 1999. The last non-MLS team to reach the final was the Sacramento Republic FC in 2022. In 1999, the U.S. Soccer Federation honored one of American soccer's most important patrons, Lamar Hunt, by changing the official title of the tournament to the Lamar Hunt U.S. Open Cup. The winners of the tournament were awarded the Dewar Cup, donated by Sir Thomas Dewar for the promotion of soccer in America in 1912, until it was retired for its poor condition in 1979. It was brought back into use by the United States Adult Soccer Association in 1997, but went back on permanent display at the now closed National Soccer Hall of Fame in Oneonta, New York, and the recent winners of the tournament have been awarded a new, different trophy.

== Results ==
Key

- (a.e.t.) – Match decided after extra time
- (p) – Match decided by a penalty shoot-out after extra time
- † – Winning team won double (Note: In American soccer, the "double" consists of winning two major trophies available to the club. For the purposes of this article, this would mean either the league regular season or league championship along with the Open Cup.)
- ‡ – Winning team won the treble (Note: In American soccer, the "treble" consists of winning three major trophies available to the club. For the purposes of this article it can mean winning the Open Cup along with the league regular season, league playoffs, the now-defunct Lewis Cup (league cup), or the CONCACAF Champions Cup.)

U.S. Open Cup finals
Ed.	Season	Champions	Score	Runners–up	Stadium	City	Att.	Ref.
1	1913–14	Brooklyn Field Club	2–1	Brooklyn Celtic	Coats Field	Pawtucket, Rhode Island	10,000	
2	1914–15	Bethlehem Steel †	3–1	Brooklyn Celtic	Taylor Field	Bethlehem, Pennsylvania	7,500	
3	1915–16	Bethlehem Steel (2)	1–0	Fall River Rovers	Coats Field	Pawtucket, Rhode Island	10,000	
4	1916–17	Fall River Rovers	1–0	Bethlehem Steel	Coats Field	Pawtucket, Rhode Island	7,000	
5	1917–18	Bethlehem Steel (3)	2–2	Fall River Rovers	Heritage Park	Fall River, Massachusetts	13,000	
5	1917–18	Bethlehem Steel (3)	3–0	Fall River Rovers	Federal League Park	Harrison, New Jersey	7,000	
6	1918–19	Bethlehem Steel (4) †	2–0	Paterson F.C.	Athletic Field	Fall River, Massachusetts	10,000	
7	1919–20	Ben Millers †	2–1	Fore River	Handlan's Park	St. Louis, Missouri	12,000	
8	1920–21	Robins Dry Dock (2)	4–2	Scullin Steel	Athletic Field	Fall River, Massachusetts	8,000	
9	1921–22	Scullin Steel †	3–2	Todd Shipyards	High School Field	St. Louis, Missouri	8,000	
10	1922–23	Paterson F.C.	2–2	Scullin Steel	Federal League Park	Harrison, New Jersey	15,000	
10	1922–23	Paterson F.C.	3–0	Scullin Steel	High School Field	St. Louis, Missouri	—N/a	
11	1923–24	Fall River F.C. †	4–2	Vesper Buick	High School Field	St. Louis, Missouri	14,000	
12	1924–25	Shawsheen Indians	3–0	Chicago Canadian Club	Mark's Stadium	North Tiverton, Rhode Island	2,500	
13	1925–26	Bethlehem Steel	7–2	Ben Millers	Ebbets Field	Brooklyn, New York	18,000	
13	1927	Fall River F.C. (2)	7–0	Holley Carburetor	University of Detroit Stadium	Detroit, Michigan	10,000	
14	1928	New York Nationals	1–1	Chicago Bricklayers	Polo Grounds	Manhattan, New York	16,000	
14	1928	New York Nationals	3–0	Chicago Bricklayers	Soldier Field	Chicago, Illinois	15,000	
15	1928–29	New York Hakoah	2–0	St. Louis Madison Kennel	Sportsman's Park	St. Louis, Missouri	15,000	
15	1928–29	New York Hakoah	3–0	St. Louis Madison Kennel	Dexter Park	Queens, New York	21,583	
16	1929–30	Fall River F.C. (2) ‡	7–2	Cleveland Bruell	Polo Grounds	Manhattan, New York	10,000	
16	1929–30	Fall River F.C. (2) ‡	2–1	Cleveland Bruell	Luna Park	Cleveland, Ohio	3,500	
17	1931	Fall River F.C. (4)	6–2	Chicago Bricklayers	Polo Grounds	Manhattan, New York	12,000	
17	1931	Fall River F.C. (4)	1–1	Chicago Bricklayers	Mills Stadium	Chicago, Illinois	8,000	
17	1931	Fall River F.C. (4)	2–0	Chicago Bricklayers	Sparta Field	Chicago, Illinois	4,500	
18	1932	New Bedford Whalers	3–3	Stix, Baer and Fuller	Sportsman's Park	St. Louis, Missouri	7,181	
18	1932	New Bedford Whalers	2–1	Stix, Baer and Fuller	Sportsman's Park	St. Louis, Missouri	7,371	
19	1933	Stix, Baer and Fuller	1–0	New York Americans	Sportsman's Park	St. Louis, Missouri	15,200	
19	1933	Stix, Baer and Fuller	2–1	New York Americans	Starlight Park	The Bronx, New York	4,200	
20	1934	Stix, Baer and Fuller (2)	4–2	Pawtucket Rangers	Walsh Stadium	St. Louis, Missouri	7,122	
20	1934	Stix, Baer and Fuller (2)	2–3	Pawtucket Rangers	Coats Field	Pawtucket, Rhode Island	4,500	
20	1934	Stix, Baer and Fuller (2)	5–0	Pawtucket Rangers	Walsh Stadium	St. Louis, Missouri	7,657	
21	1935	St. Louis Central Breweries (3)	5–2	Pawtucket Rangers	Walsh Stadium	St. Louis, Missouri	4,500	
21	1935	St. Louis Central Breweries (3)	1–1	Pawtucket Rangers	Coats Field	Pawtucket, Rhode Island	4,000	
21	1935	St. Louis Central Breweries (3)	1–3	Pawtucket Rangers	Walsh Stadium	St. Louis, Missouri	3,000	
22	1936	Uhrik Truckers	2–2	St. Louis Shamrocks	Walsh Stadium	St. Louis, Missouri	3,400	
22	1936	Uhrik Truckers	3–0	St. Louis Shamrocks	Rifle Club Grounds	Philadelphia, Pennsylvania	8,000	
23	1937	New York Americans	0–1	St. Louis Shamrocks	Public Schools Stadium	St. Louis, Missouri	5,083	
23	1937	New York Americans	4–2	St. Louis Shamrocks	Starlight Park	The Bronx, New York	6,000	
24	1938	Chicago Sparta	3–0	Brooklyn St. Mary's Celtic	Sparta Stadium	Chicago, Illinois	4,000	
24	1938	Chicago Sparta	3–2	Brooklyn St. Mary's Celtic	Starlight Park	The Bronx, New York	10,000	
25	1939	Brooklyn St. Mary's Celtic	1–0	Chicago Manhattan Beer	Sparta Stadium	Chicago, Illinois	5,000	
25	1939	Brooklyn St. Mary's Celtic	4–1	Chicago Manhattan Beer	Starlight Park	The Bronx, New York	8,000	
26	1939–40	Baltimore S.C. (Note: After two draws and being unable to agree on arrangements for a third match, Baltimore S.C. and Chicago Sparta shared the title.)	0–0	(none)	Bugle Field	Baltimore, Maryland	3,000	
26	1939–40	Sparta Fallstaff	2–2	(none)	Sparta Stadium	Chicago, Illinois	2,519	
27	1941	Pawtucket F.C.	4–2	Detroit Chrysler	Coats Field	Pawtucket, Rhode Island	3,000	
27	1941	Pawtucket F.C.	4–3 (a.e.t.)	Detroit Chrysler	Chrysler Field	Detroit, Michigan	2,500	
28	1942	Pittsburgh Gallatin	2–1	Pawtucket F.C.	Legion Field	Donora, Pennsylvania	—N/a	
28	1942	Pittsburgh Gallatin	4–2	Pawtucket F.C.	Coats Field	Pawtucket, Rhode Island	—N/a	
29	1943	Brooklyn Hispano	2–2	Morgan Strasser	Starlight Park	The Bronx, New York	—N/a	
29	1943	Brooklyn Hispano	3–2	Morgan Strasser	Starlight Park	The Bronx, New York	—N/a	
30	1944	Brooklyn Hispano (2)	4–0	Morgan Strasser	Polo Grounds	Manhattan, New York	—N/a	
31	1945	Brookhattan	4–1	Cleveland Americans	Starlight Park	The Bronx, New York	—N/a	
31	1945	Brookhattan	2–1	Cleveland Americans	Shaw Field	Cleveland, Ohio	—N/a	
32	1946	Chicago Viking A.A.	1–1	Ponta Delgada S.C.	Mark's Stadium	North Tiverton, Rhode Island	—N/a	
32	1946	Chicago Viking A.A.	2–1	Ponta Delgada S.C.	Comiskey Park	Chicago, Illinois	—N/a	
33	1947	Ponta Delgada S.C.	6–1	Chicago Sparta	Ponta Stadium	North Tiverton, Rhode Island	2,400	
33	1947	Ponta Delgada S.C.	3–2	Chicago Sparta	Sparta Stadium	Chicago, Illinois	5,000	
34	1948	St. Louis Simpkins–Ford	3–2	Brookhattan–Galicia	Sportsman's Park	St. Louis, Missouri	2,226	
35	1949	Morgan Strasser	0–1	Philadelphia Nationals	Holmes Stadium	Philadelphia, Pennsylvania	—N/a	
35	1949	Morgan Strasser	4–2	Philadelphia Nationals	Bridgeville Park	Bridgeville, Pennsylvania	1,000	
36	1950	St. Louis Simpkins–Ford (2)	2–0	Ponta Delgada S.C.	Public Schools Stadium	St. Louis, Missouri	2,507	
36	1950	St. Louis Simpkins–Ford (2)	1–1	Ponta Delgada S.C.	Ponta Stadium	North Tiverton, Rhode Island	3,310	
37	1951	New York German–Hungarian S.C.	2–4	Heidelberg S.C.	Bridgeville Park	Bridgeville, Pennsylvania	—N/a	
37	1951	New York German–Hungarian S.C.	6–2	Heidelberg S.C.	Metropolitan Oval	Queens, New York	—N/a	
38	1952	Harmarville Hurricanes	3–4	Philadelphia Nationals	—N/a	Harmarville, Pennsylvania	3,500	
38	1952	Harmarville Hurricanes	4–1	Philadelphia Nationals	Holmes Stadium	Philadelphia, Pennsylvania	—N/a	
39	1953	Chicago Falcons	2–0	Harmarville Hurricanes	Sparta Stadium	Chicago, Illinois	—N/a	
39	1953	Chicago Falcons	1–0	Harmarville Hurricanes	—N/a	Harmarville, Pennsylvania	—N/a	
40	1954	New York Americans (2)	1–1	St. Louis Kutis S.C.	Oakland Stadium	St. Louis, Missouri	5,127	
40	1954	New York Americans (2)	2–0	St. Louis Kutis S.C.	Triborough Stadium	Randalls Island, New York	—N/a	
41	1955	S.C. Eintracht	2–0	Los Angeles Danes	Rancho Cienega	Los Angeles, California	—N/a	
42	1956	Harmarville Hurricanes (2)	0–1	Chicago Schwaben	Winnemac Park	Chicago, Illinois	—N/a	
42	1956	Harmarville Hurricanes (2)	3–1	Chicago Schwaben	Consumer Field	Harmarville, Pennsylvania	5,000	
43	1957	St. Louis Kutis S.C.	3–0	New York Hakoah	Public Schools Stadium	St. Louis, Missouri	5,000	
43	1957	St. Louis Kutis S.C.	3–1	New York Hakoah	Zerega Oval	The Bronx, New York	2,500	
44	1958	Los Angeles Kickers	2–1 (a.e.t.)	Baltimore Pompei	Kirk Field	Baltimore, Maryland	4,500	
45	1959	McIlvaine Canvasbacks	4–3	Fall River S.C.	Rancho Cienega	Los Angeles, California	—N/a	
46	1960	Philadelphia Ukrainian Nationals	5–3 (a.e.t.)	Los Angeles Kickers	Edison Field	Philadelphia, Pennsylvania	5,500	
47	1961	Philadelphia Ukrainian Nationals (2)	2–2	Los Angeles Scots	Rancho Cienega	Los Angeles, California	—N/a	
47	1961	Philadelphia Ukrainian Nationals (2)	5–2	Los Angeles Scots	McCarthy Stadium	Philadelphia, Pennsylvania	6,000	
48	1962	New York Hungaria	3–2	San Francisco Scots	Eintracht Oval	Queens, New York	—N/a	
49	1963	Philadelphia Ukrainian Nationals (3)	1–0 (a.e.t.)	Los Angeles Armenians	Edison Field	Philadelphia, Pennsylvania	4,000	
50	1964	Los Angeles Kickers (2)	2–2 (a.e.t.)	Philadelphia Ukrainian Nationals	Cambria Field	Philadelphia, Pennsylvania	—N/a	
50	1964	Los Angeles Kickers (2)	2–0	Philadelphia Ukrainian Nationals	Wrigley Field	Los Angeles, California	—N/a	
51	1965	New York Ukrainians	1–1 (a.e.t.)	Chicago Hansa	Ukrainians Field	New York, New York	—N/a	
51	1965	New York Ukrainians	4–1	Chicago Hansa	Hanson Stadium	Chicago, Illinois	—N/a	
52	1966	Philadelphia Ukrainian Nationals (4)	1–0	Orange County SC	Rancho Cienega	Los Angeles, California	—N/a	
52	1966	Philadelphia Ukrainian Nationals (4)	3–0	Orange County SC	Edison Field	Philadelphia, Pennsylvania	5,000	
53	1967	Greek American AA	4–2	Orange County SC	Eintracht Oval	Queens, New York	2,500	
54	1968	Greek American AA (2)	1–1	Chicago Olympic	Hanson Stadium	Chicago, Illinois	—N/a	
54	1968	Greek American AA (2)	1–0	Chicago Olympic	Eintracht Oval	Queens, New York	—N/a	
55	1969	Greek American AA (3)	1–0	Montabello Armenians	Rancho Cienega	Los Angeles, California	—N/a	
56	1970	Elizabeth S.C.	2–1	Los Angeles Croatia	Randall's Island Stadium	Randalls Island, New York	—N/a	
57	1971	New York Hota Bavarian S.C.	6–4 (a.e.t.)	San Pedro Yugoslavs	Rancho Cienega	Los Angeles, California	3,700	
58	1972	Elizabeth S.C. (2)	1–0	San Pedro Yugoslavs	Farcher's Grove Stadium	Union, New Jersey	—N/a	
59	1973	Maccabee Los Angeles	5–3 (a.e.t.)	Cleveland Inter	Rancho Cienega	Los Angeles, California	—N/a	
60	1974	Greek American AA (4)	2–0	Chicago Croatian	Metropolitan Oval	Queens, New York	2,000	
61	1975	Maccabee Los Angeles (2)	1–0	New York Inter–Giuliana	Murdock Stadium	Torrance, California	2,152	
62	1976	San Francisco I.A.C.	1–0	New York Inter–Giuliana	Metropolitan Oval	Queens, New York	—N/a	
63	1977	Maccabee Los Angeles (3)	5–1	Philadelphia United German–Hungarians	Jackie Robinson Field	Los Angeles, California	2,125	
64	1978	Maccabee Los Angeles (4)	2–0 (a.e.t.)	Bridgeport Vasco da Gama	Giants Stadium	East Rutherford, New Jersey	—N/a	
65	1979	Brooklyn Dodgers S.C.	2–1	Chicago Croatian	Winnemac Stadium	Chicago, Illinois	—N/a	
66	1980	New York Pancyprian-Freedoms	3–2	Maccabee Los Angeles	Metropolitan Oval	Queens, New York	—N/a	
67	1981	Maccabee Los Angeles (5)	5–1	Brooklyn Dodgers S.C.	Daniel's Field	Los Angeles, California	1,200	
68	1982	New York Pancyprian-Freedoms (2)	4–3 (a.e.t.)	Maccabee Los Angeles	Hanson Stadium	Chicago, Illinois	1,200	
69	1983	New York Pancyprian-Freedoms (3)	4–3	St. Louis Kutis S.C.	Delmar Stadium	Houston, Texas	800	
70	1984	New York AO Krete	4–2	San Pedro Yugoslavs	St. Louis Soccer Park	St. Louis, Missouri	—N/a	
71	1985	Greek-American A.C.	2–1	St. Louis Kutis S.C.	St. Louis Soccer Park	St. Louis, Missouri	—N/a	
72	1986	St. Louis Kutis S.C. (2)	1–0	San Pedro Yugoslavs	St. Louis Soccer Park	St. Louis, Missouri	—N/a	
73	1987	Club España	0–0 (3–2 p)	Seattle Mitre Eagles	St. Louis Soccer Park	St. Louis, Missouri	—N/a	
74	1988	St. Louis Busch Seniors	2–1 (a.e.t.)	Greek-American A.C.	St. Louis Soccer Park	St. Louis, Missouri	6,200	
74	1989	St. Petersburg Kickers	2–1 (a.e.t.)	Greek American AA	St. Louis Soccer Park	St. Louis, Missouri	6,200	
75	1990	A.A.C. Eagles	2–1	Brooklyn Italians	Kuntz Stadium	Indianapolis, Indiana	3,116	
76	1991	Brooklyn Italians (2)	1–0	Richardson Rockets	Brooklyn College	Brooklyn, New York	1,500	
77	1992	San Jose Oaks	2–1	Bridgeport Vasco da Gama	Kuntz Stadium	Indianapolis, Indiana	2,500	
78	1993	C.D. Mexico	5–0	Philadelphia United German–Hungarians	Kuntz Stadium	Indianapolis, Indiana	3,500	
79	1994	Greek-American A.C. (2)	3–0	Bavarian Leinenkugel	UGH Field	Oakford, Pennsylvania	7,234	
80	1995	Richmond Kickers	1–1 (4–2 p)	El Paso Patriots	SISD Stadium	El Paso, Texas	7,378	
81	1996	D.C. United †	3–0	Rochester Rhinos	Robert F. Kennedy Stadium	Washington, D.C.	7,234	
82	1997	Dallas Burn	0–0 (5–3 p)	D.C. United	Carroll Stadium	Indianapolis, Indiana	9,766	
83	1998	Chicago Fire †	2–1 (a.e.t.)	Columbus Crew	Soldier Field	Chicago, Illinois	18,615	
84	1999	Rochester Rhinos	2–0	Colorado Rapids	Columbus Crew Stadium	Columbus, Ohio	4,555	
85	2000	Chicago Fire (2)	2–1	Miami Fusion	Soldier Field	Chicago, Illinois	19,146	
86	2001	Los Angeles Galaxy	2–1 (a.e.t.)	New England Revolution	Titan Stadium	Fullerton, California	4,195	
87	2002	Columbus Crew	1–0	Los Angeles Galaxy	Columbus Crew Stadium	Columbus, Ohio	6,054	
88	2003	Chicago Fire (3) †	1–0	MetroStars	Giants Stadium	East Rutherford, New Jersey	5,183	
89	2004	Kansas City Wizards	1–0 (a.e.t.)	Chicago Fire	Arrowhead Stadium	Kansas City, Missouri	8,819	
90	2005	Los Angeles Galaxy (2) †	1–0	FC Dallas	Home Depot Center	Carson, California	10,000	
91	2006	Chicago Fire (4)	3–1	Los Angeles Galaxy	Toyota Park	Bridgeview, Illinois	8,185	
92	2007	New England Revolution	3–2	FC Dallas	Pizza Hut Park	Frisco, Texas	10,618	
93	2008	D.C. United (2)	2–1	Charleston Battery	Robert F. Kennedy Stadium	Washington, D.C.	8,212	
94	2009	Seattle Sounders FC	2–1	D.C. United	Robert F. Kennedy Stadium	Washington, D.C.	17,329	
95	2010	Seattle Sounders FC (2)	2–1	Columbus Crew	Qwest Field	Seattle, Washington	31,311	
96	2011	Seattle Sounders FC (3)	2–0	Chicago Fire	CenturyLink Field	Seattle, Washington	35,615	
97	2012	Sporting Kansas City (2)	1–1 (3–2 p)	Seattle Sounders FC	Livestrong Sporting Park	Kansas City, Kansas	18,873	
98	2013	D.C. United (3)	1–0	Real Salt Lake	Rio Tinto Stadium	Sandy, Utah	17,608	
99	2014	Seattle Sounders FC (4) †	3–1 (a.e.t.)	Philadelphia Union	PPL Park	Chester, Pennsylvania	15,256	
100	2015	Sporting Kansas City (3)	1–1 (7–6 p)	Philadelphia Union	PPL Park	Chester, Pennsylvania	14,463	
101	2016	FC Dallas (2) †	4–2	New England Revolution	Toyota Stadium	Frisco, Texas	16,612	
102	2017	Sporting Kansas City (4)	2–1	New York Red Bulls	Children's Mercy Park	Kansas City, Kansas	21,523	
103	2018	Houston Dynamo	3–0	Philadelphia Union	BBVA Compass Stadium	Houston, Texas	16,060	
104	2019	Atlanta United FC	2–1	Minnesota United FC	Mercedes-Benz Stadium	Atlanta, Georgia	35,709	
—	2020	(Not held due to the COVID-19 pandemic)						
—	2021	(Not held due to the COVID-19 pandemic)						
105	2022	Orlando City SC	3–0	Sacramento Republic FC	Exploria Stadium	Orlando, Florida	25,527	
106	2023	Houston Dynamo FC (2)	2–1	Inter Miami CF	DRV PNK Stadium	Fort Lauderdale, Florida	20,288	
107	2024	Los Angeles FC	3–1 (a.e.t.)	Sporting Kansas City	BMO Stadium	Los Angeles, California	22,214	
108	2025	Nashville SC	2–1	Austin FC	Q2 Stadium	Austin, Texas	20,738	
109	2026	St. Louis City SC	0–0 (5–3 p)	Columbus Crew	ScottsMiracle-Gro Field	Columbus, Ohio	20,250	

== Titles by team ==
Notes

- Teams with more than a title listed below.
- Teams shown in italics are no longer in existence.

Club	Titles	Winning years	Runn.	Runners-up years
Maccabee Los Angeles	5	1973, 1975, 1977, 1978, 1981	2	1980, 1982
Bethlehem Steel	5	1914–15, 1915–16, 1917–18, 1918–19, 1926	1	1916–17, 1918
Chicago Fire	4	1998, 2000, 2003, 2006	2	2004, 2011
Greek American AA	4	1967, 1968, 1969	1	1989
Philadelphia Tridents	4	1960, 1961, 1963, 1966	1	1964
Seattle Sounders FC	4	2009, 2010, 2011, 2014	1	2012
Fall River F.C.	4	1923–24, 1927, 1929–30, 1931	0	–
Sporting Kansas City	4	2004, (Note: "Kansas City Wizards" by then.) 2012, 2015, 2017	1	2024
Stix, Baer and Fuller	2	1933, 1934, 1935 (Note: "St. Louis Central Breweries" by then.)	3	1932, 1936, 1937 (Note: "St. Louis Shamrocks" by then.)
New York Pancyprian-Freedoms	3	1980, 1982, 1983	0	–
D.C. United	3	1996, 2008, 2013	2	1997, 2009
Brooklyn Italians	2	1979 (Note: "Brooklyn Dodgers" by then.), 1991	2	1981, 1990
Brooklyn Hispano	2	1943, 1944	0	–
Houston Dynamo FC	2	2018, 2023	0	–
Los Angeles Galaxy	2	2001, 2005	2	2002, 2006
FC Dallas	2	1997, (Note: "Dallas Burn" by then.) 2016	2	2005, 2007

Source: RSSSF

== See also ==
- History of the U.S. Open Cup
- U.S. Open Cup
- List of American and Canadian soccer champions
- List of U.S. Open Cup winning head coaches
