= History of the U.S. Open Cup =

American soccer competition history

The Lamar Hunt U.S. Open Cup is an American soccer competition open to all United States Soccer Federation affiliated teams, from amateur adult club teams to the professional clubs of Major League Soccer. The following is the history of the U.S. Open Cup tournament.

For a listing of all U.S. Open Cup champions, see the list of U.S. Open Cup finals.

== AFA era ==
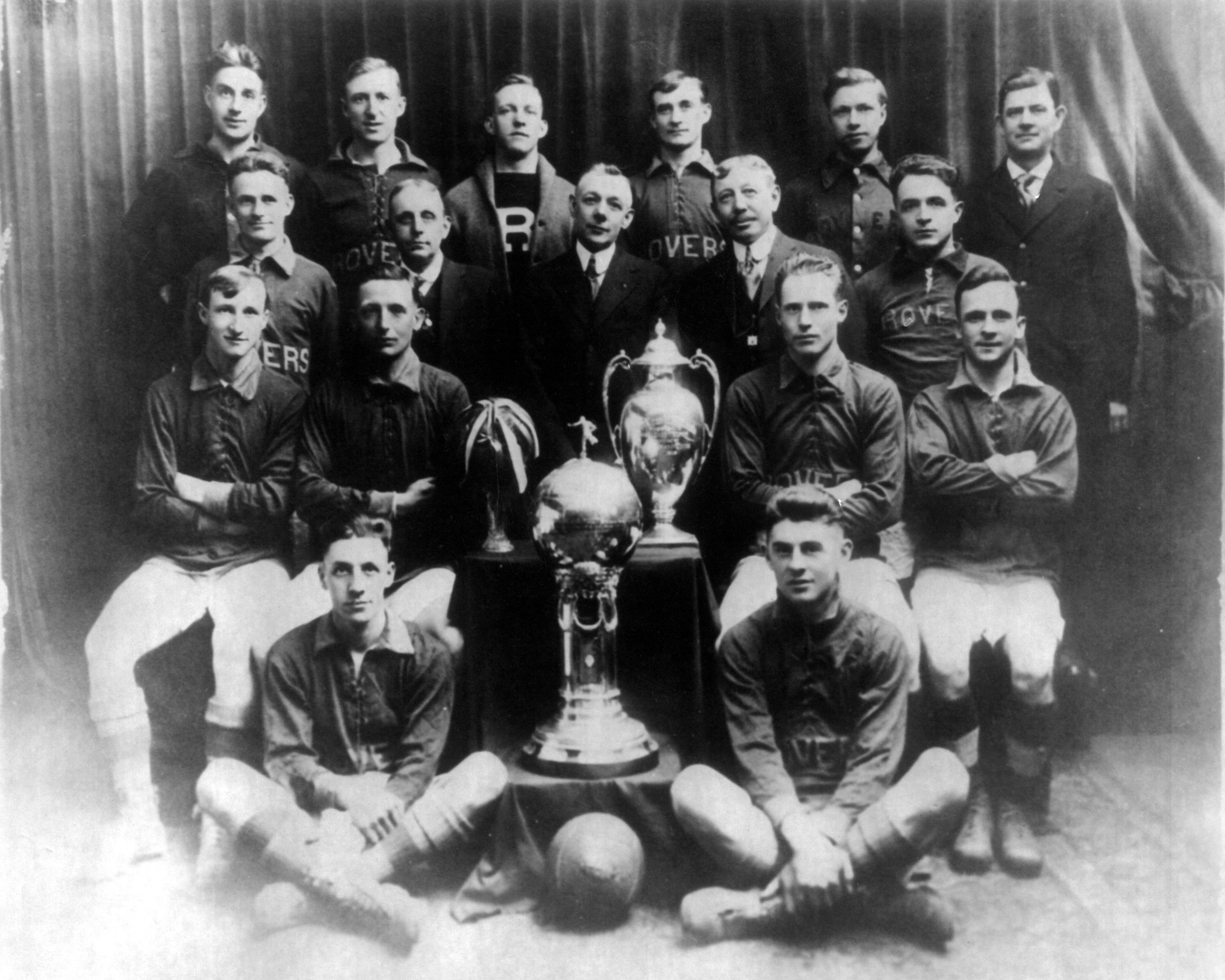
The Fall River Rovers were among the few clubs to win both the National Challenge Cup and the American Cup.

Before the creation of the United States Soccer Federation, soccer in the United States was organized on regional levels, with no governing body overlooking regional soccer leagues. The first non-league organizing body within the United States was the American Football Association (AFA) which was incarnated in 1884. The AFA sought to standardize rules for teams competing in northern New Jersey and southern New York. Within two years, this region began to widen to include teams in Pennsylvania and Massachusetts.

Within a year of its founding, the AFA organized the first non-league cup in U.S. soccer history, known as the American Cup. Clubs from New Jersey and Massachusetts dominated the first twelve years. It would not be until 1897 that a club from outside those two states won the American Cup. Philadelphia Manz brought the title to Pennsylvania for the first time. Due to internal conflicts within the AFA, the cup was suspended in 1899, and it was not resumed until 1906. The conflicts within the AFA led to a movement to create a truly national body to oversee American soccer. Drawing on both its position as the oldest soccer organization and the status of the American Cup, the AFA argued that it should be the nationally recognized body.

In October 1911, a competing body, the American Amateur Football Association (AAFA) was created. The association quickly spread outside of the Northeast and created its own cup in 1912, the American Amateur Football Association Cup. That year, both the AFA and AAFA applied for membership in FIFA, the international governing body for soccer. In 1913, the AAFA gained an edge over the AFA when several AFA organizations moved to the AAFA. On April 5, 1913, the AAFA reorganized as the United States Football Association, presently known as the United States Soccer Federation. FIFA quickly granted a provisional membership and USFA began exerting its influence on the sport. This led to the establishment of the National Challenge Cup that fall. The National Challenge Cup quickly grew to overshadow the American Cup. However, both cups were played simultaneously for the next ten years. Declining respect for the AFA led to the withdrawal of several associations from its cup in 1917. Further competition came in 1924 when USFA created the National Amateur Cup. That spelled the death knell for the American Cup. It played its last season in 1924.

== National Challenge Cup era ==
The first cup for National Cup winners was donated by Thomas Dewar and known as the "Dewar Cup".

The competition dates back to 1914, when it was known as the National Challenge Cup. The actual tournament began play following FIFA sanctioning of the American Amateur Football Association (AAFA), which rebranded as United States Football Association (USFA). Following the provisional sanctioning of FIFA in 1913, USFA quickly attempted to earn full sanctioning with the creation of an official national cup competition, which was called the National Challenge Cup, the roots of the modern day Open Cup. In 1914, the USFA overlooked the inaugural National Challenge Cup. In the first final, the Brooklyn Field Club of Brooklyn, New York took on cross-borough rival Brooklyn Celtic. Played at Coates Field in Pawtucket, Rhode Island, Field Club defeated Celtic 2–1 thanks to goals from Field Club's Adamson and Ford. In the first ever final, nearly 10,000 fans piled into Coates to watch the match. The winners of the tournament were awarded the Dewar Cup, donated by Sir Thomas Dewar for the promotion of soccer in America in 1912, until it was retired due to poor condition in 1979. It was brought back into use by the United States Adult Soccer Association in 1997, but went back on permanent display at the now closed National Soccer Hall of Fame in Oneonta, New York, and the recent winners of the tournament have been awarded a new, different trophy. Despite this change, the name of each winning club is still added to the base of the original Dewar Cup.

=== ASL Era ===
Throughout the latter part of the 1910s, the competition typically saw clubs from New York City or the New England-corridor make it to the finals, in which the clubs played in local regional leagues. However, with the creation of the American Soccer League, the competition became dominated by these ASL clubs, as well as clubs that played in the St. Louis Soccer League (STLSL).

One of the first STLSL clubs to break through the domestic cup competition was Scullin Steel, who won the 1922 National Challenge Cup. While Scullins found success in the tournament, ASL clubs typically had more luck in the competition such as ASL titans Bethlehem Steel, Fall River F.C. and Paterson F.C.

=== ASL vs. USFA conflicts ===
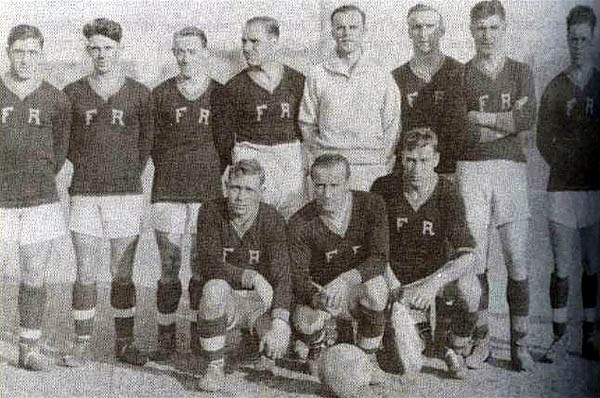
Fall River F.C. won the 1924, 1927, 1930 and 1931 editions of the Challenge Cup

Towards the latter portions of the 1920s a period in American soccer known as the "American Soccer Wars" ignited. The Soccer Wars regarded the internal conflicts with the American Soccer League and their affiliated clubs participating in the National Challenge Cup. The debate involved whether the United States Football Association or the American Soccer League was the true chief organization of American soccer at the time, and consequently wrecked the reputation and possibly even the popularity of the sport domestically. The colloquial "war" has been considered responsible for the fall of the ASL, and the end to the first golden age of American soccer.

The initial issue with the ASL had been the scheduling of the National Challenge Cup, which had been straining for the ASL season schedule. Consequently, the ASL boycotted the 1925 Challenge Cup due to scheduling conflicts, and the lack of cooperation the USFA inflicted on the ASL. American soccer historians claim that the real issue was the ASL vying to be the premier soccer body in the United States.

In 1927, the issue intensified as ASL clubs were accused by FIFA for signing European players who were already under contract to European clubs. Due to the conflict and apparent corruption in the ASL, then USFA president, Andrew M. Brown traveled to Helsinki, Finland for the 1927 FIFA Congress in the hopes of removing any penalizations imposed on the ASL and USFA. Other issues regarding the soccer league involved the closed league model and the lack of American soccer players dominating the league. It resulted in ASL owners wanting to run their soccer clubs more like Major League Baseball teams, as many ASL owners owned MLB franchises. According to owners of ASL clubs, they saw these rulings as restrictions imposed on themselves, including the National Challenge Cup.

With the hope of breaking away from the National Challenge Cup, Charles Stoneham, an owner of the New York Nationals proposed that the ASL would create their own tournament to determine the champion of the ASL, and thus ultimately determine the top American soccer club. This was the creation of early forms of playoffs culminating a regular season. Additionally, the proposal included expanding into the Midwest to include clubs from the Ohio River Valley and St. Louis regions, and create a new division for these clubs. Stoneham's plan involved having the two divisions compete in their own season, and the top clubs in each division playing in the ASL tournament to determine the ASL champion. Before the proposal, the National Challenge Cup was seen as the ultimate title in American soccer since most professional leagues in the United States focused on a specific region, rather than encompassing the entire country as a whole.

=== The "American Soccer Wars" ===
The problem with this system was that the American Soccer League was operating under a closed league model with a fixed number of franchises. This new tournament, or playoffs, would permanently cap the number of clubs entering this premier competition, unlike the National Challenge Cup, which the tournament was open to any USFA-affiliated team. Due to such reasons, three teams, Bethlehem Steel, the New York Giants S.C. and the Newark Skeeters, rejected the proposal, played in the 1928 National Challenge Cup and were subsequently suspended from the league and fined $1,000. Because of the ASL's decision, the USFA suspended the ASL which ignited the "Soccer Wars". In the 1928–29 American Soccer League, the Steel, Giants and Skeeters did not play in the ASL and joined local semi-professional leagues agglomerating to form the Eastern Professional Soccer League.

Support for the USFA from other national federations, along with financial disadvantages the ASL faced as an unsanctioned league, eventually convinced the ASL that it could not win this "soccer war" and should yield. The "war" between the USFA and ASL was finally settled in early October 1929. During that time the ASL had already begun its 1929–30 season, halted during the settlement. Thanks to the settlement, the ASL was reassembled, and played the remainder of the 1929–30-year under the moniker "Atlantic Coast League".

=== Great Depression and collapse of ASL I ===
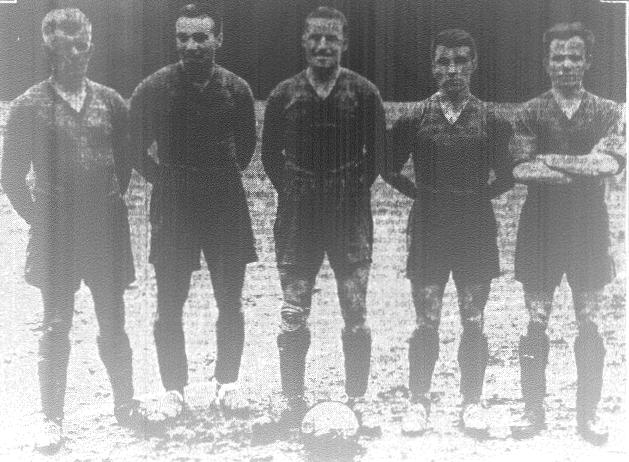
Players of Stix, Baer and Fuller, who were dominant in the Challenge Cup in the 1930s

Just two weeks following the United States Football Association and American Soccer League settlement, the stock market crashed. The abrupt and intense economic impact drastically affected the ASL in the league's Spring 1930 season, in which several clubs defaulted during the season, and clubs did not finish the season with the same number of matches played. Initially, the struggles in ASL did not affect the league's stronger clubs, as the Fall River F.C. completed the double by winning both the 1930 season and the 1930 National Challenge Cup.

As the Great Depression intensified, the original ASL folded following the Fall 1932 season, which was its 15th season in existence. At the apex of the Depression, several surviving clubs created an incarnation of the ASL which began play in 1933, but the stringent economy lessened the ability of ASL teams to field strong teams, and thereby lacked the financial means nor interest to attract foreign players. This consequently caused a Dark Age of soccer in which the sport as well as the National Challenge Cup fell out of popularity and into obscurity.

In spite of the decline in the sport's popularity, several pockets of the country, primarily the Heartland and New England regions, as well as the New York City and St. Louis metropolitan areas, continued to see excessive popularity of the sport, specifically with ethnic groups and expatriates. The popularity of soccer in these areas reflected on the Challenge Cup during the later Great Depression years, through the World War II years. Most clubs participating were either top amateur teams or semi-professional clubs that hoisted a handful of U.S. internationals, who worked part-time jobs.

=== World War II and ASL II ===
As World War II raged on, the National Challenge Cup continued to hold the annual tournament, in spite of several other European nations putting their domestic cups on hold. During the early 1940s, the competition was dominated by Northeastern clubs, particularly Brooklyn Hispano (titles in 1943 and 1944) and their cross-town rivals Brookhattan (title in 1945, finals appearance in 1948). Pawtucket F.C., Ponta Delgada S.C., and Morgan Strasser also made multiple finals appearances in the decade, each winning one title.

== Post war era ==
With the fall of the original American Soccer League after 1933, and the declining number of professional clubs in the American Soccer League II, the competition began to be dominated by several amateur sides, particularly clubs that were based in inner city areas. From the mid-1940s until the mid-1990s, the competition finals featured only amateur teams. In fact, the United States Soccer Football Association (USSFA) eventually gave primary control of the tournament to the United States Adult Soccer Association, which presently overlooks the fifth tier of American soccer.

In spite of the rise of the North American Soccer League, NASL clubs declined to participate in the tournament, fearing it would divert interest away from the NASL Playoffs, and that playing a mix of minor league clubs and amateur clubs might also detract interest.

=== Inner City dominance ===
Throughout the post-war era, the National Cup was heavily dominated by clubs based in inner city urban cores, particularly in the New York City, Los Angeles and Philadelphia area. Beginning in 1959, these regions were the only areas that heralded a National Cup champion, until 1976 when SFAC of the San Francisco Bay Area won the National Cup.

During the early to mid-1960s, the competition was heavily dominated between the Philadelphia Ukrainians and their expatriate counterparts, the New York Ukrainians. To some, this was considered a budding rivalry. The rivalry between Philadelphia and New York did not make its way to the National Cup Final, because of the Eastern vs. Western bracket set up, in which the final typically included a Mid-Atlantic or New Englander team, against a team from the Greater Los Angeles or San Francisco Bay Area of California. For both the Philadelphia and N.Y. Ukrainians, their domination came to an end with the rise of Cosmopolitan Soccer League juggernaut, Greek American Atlas, who won three National Cup titles consecutively, winning their first tile in 1967 against Orange County. The club's dynasty in the National Cup came to an end in the 1970 edition of the tournament, where they lost to eventual Cup runners-up Elizabeth S.C. in the semifinals.

=== LA v. NY finals ===
Towards the latter portion of the 1970s into the 1980s, the National Cup featured a final more times than not between soccer clubs based in New York and Los Angeles, the two largest metropolises in the United States. Two of the strongest clubs during this time included the New York Pancyprian-Freedoms, who won three domestic titles between 1979 and 1982, and Maccabi Los Angeles who made it to the National Cup finals seven times in nine years, from 1975 to 1984. In fact, the two teams met twice in the National Cup finals; in 1980 and 1982 with the Pancyprian-Freedoms defeating Maccabi both times.

== MLS and the start of the modern era ==
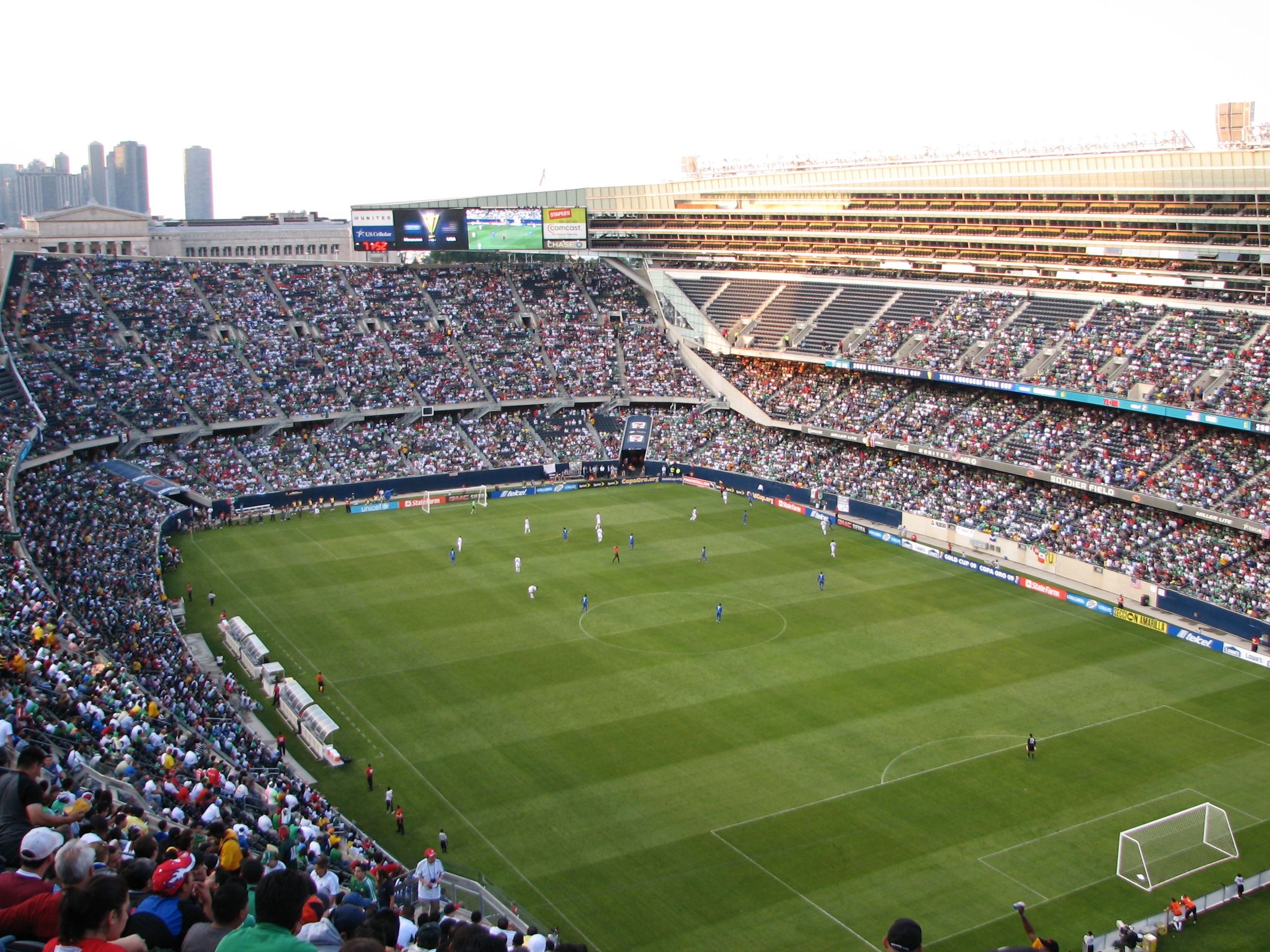
Chicago's Soldier Field hosted the 1998 final, making it the first time in 60 years the final was played in the stadium. The 1998 final had the first five-figure attendance since the ASL era of soccer.

Starting in 1995, professional clubs would retain their USSF sanctioning if their clubs agreed to participate in the tournament. The 1995 U.S. Open Cup featured a mix of amateur and professional teams, making it the first time in nearly 45 years that the two levels were integrated into Open Cup play; it is considered the beginning of the Open Cup's "modern" era.

The arrival of professional clubs on the scene dwarfed amateur clubs, and consequently, no amateur club has won or been to the Open Cup final in the MLS era. With the arrival of Major League Soccer in 1996, MLS franchises had the option to participate in the tournament on their terms. However, in 2006, all MLS franchises that were based in the United States had to participate in the tournament proper. Since the inception of MLS, an MLS club has won the Open Cup every year except 1999, when the Rochester Rhinos of the A-League defeated four MLS teams, including the Colorado Rapids in the final. The most successful MLS clubs in Open Cup play are the Chicago Fire, Sporting Kansas City, and Seattle Sounders FC, who have each accumulated four domestic titles in their existence. The four titles puts Sporting, the Fire, and the Sounders in a six-way tie for the second most Open Cup titles won.

=== Competition rebranded ===
In 1998, the United States Soccer Federation passed a motion to rebrand the tournament in honor of Lamar Hunt, who has been considered by many as one of the greatest patrons for the growth and development of professional American soccer. Hunt, who owned three MLS clubs at the time, was a key cog in creating MLS and its predecessors, the North American Soccer League and United Soccer Association. Since 1999, the tournament has been officially named the Lamar Hunt U.S. Open Cup.

=== Resurgence in popularity ===
For most of MLS' existence, league clubs could not draw the same crowds for Open Cup matches as they would for the regular season or playoff matches. Some of it is attributed to the fact that MLS clubs typically play a majority of their matches against lower-tier clubs which may create a lack of interest. Additionally, all Open Cup matches are scheduled mid-week, which can be inconvenient for fans and supporters. Often, it is considered that the MLS team that wins the Open Cup is one with great depth on their roster, or one that has nothing much to play for in league competition. The fact that there is a lesser amount of interest in the competition leads most MLS clubs to play their home Open Cup games at smaller stadiums, usually high school or smaller college football fields or on their training facilities due to the lower seating capacity, and to create a more "intimate" setting. Examples include Seattle Sounders FC who play their Open Cup matches at Starfire Sports Complex or D.C. United who play their games at Maryland SoccerPlex or George Mason Stadium.

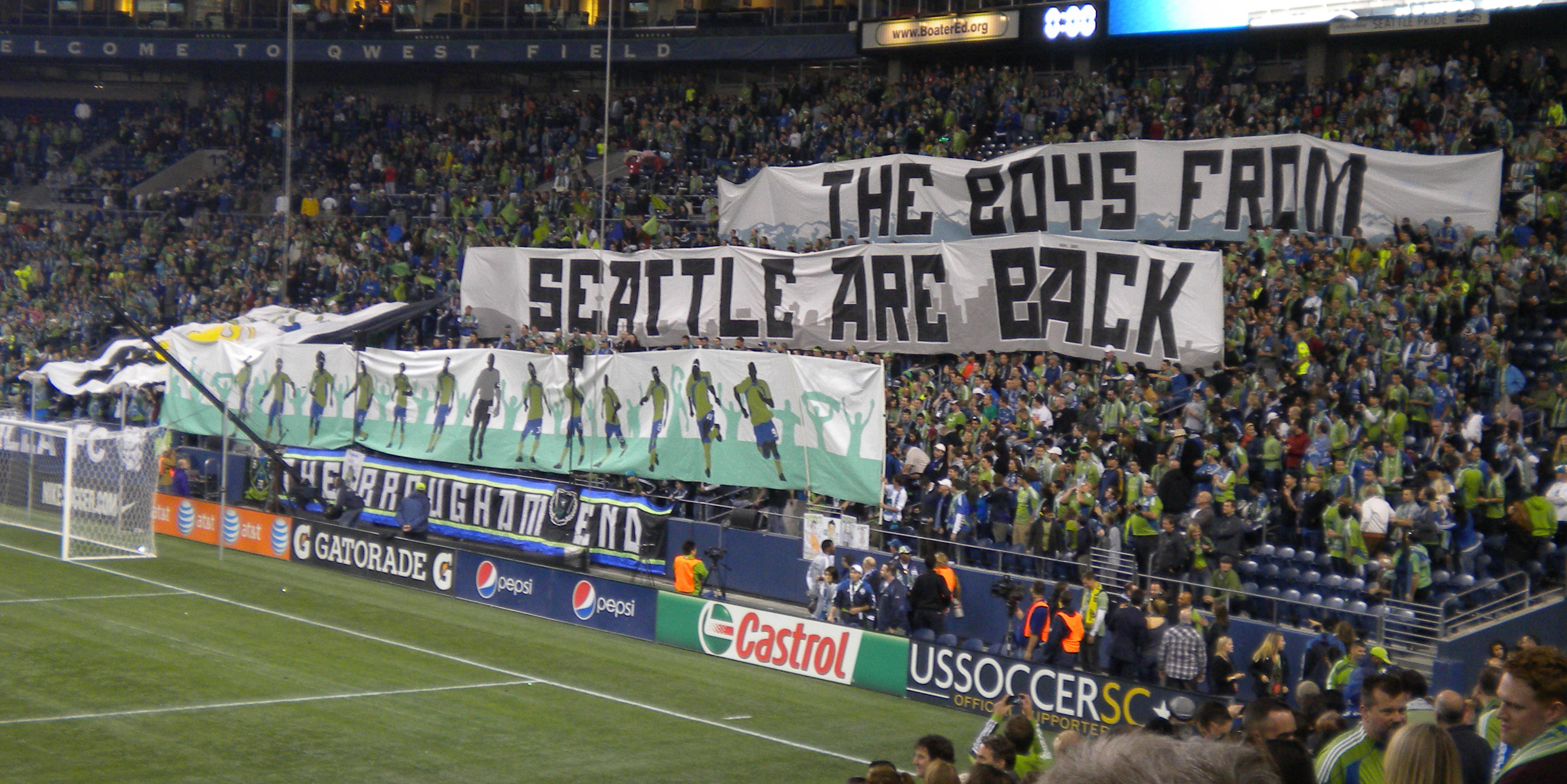
The Emerald City Supporters, a supporters' group of Seattle Sounders FC display a tifo prior to kickoff of the 2010 U.S. Open Cup final.

In spite of the disinterest in the Open Cup, some signs have indicated an upswing in the tournament importance and popularity. Some cite the competitions' long history as a critical factor in driving interest. The 2009 final, which featured storied MLS club D.C. United, saw a crowd of 17,239 attend the Open Cup final at RFK Stadium, making it the second largest Open Cup crowd in the 2000s and fifth largest overall. The reasoning behind the large crowd has been attributed to the fact that D.C. United's management marketed the Open Cup as a tournament for the team to add an additional trophy to their collection and earn a preliminary berth in the CONCACAF Champions League. For Seattle Sounders FC, the club played in and hosted the 2010 edition of the final, in front of a crowd of 31,311. It was the largest attendance for an Open Cup final thus far, outpacing the second largest crowd by slightly under 10,000. Such a crowd was considered to be the result of the Sounders' large fan base and desire to defend their 2009 Open Cup title. This trend of growing crowds has continued, with each final since and including the 2009 final drawing at least 14,000 fans; the 2019 final saw Atlanta United FC claim their first Open Cup on their home field in front of a new record crowd of 35,709.

=== Format changes ===
For the 2015 tournament, USSF announced that starting with the round of 16 they would use a fixed bracket. In the past, the bracket had been redrawn after each round to match regional teams against each other to save travel expenses. Now, in the round of 16, they would draw teams to a regional quarter of the bracket that would remain locked through the end of the tournament. The only exception was that no two teams from the same ownership group could play each other until the final. Since 2016, this scenario can only occur if at least one of the commonly owned clubs is amateur.

Through 2015, the amateur clubs have decided how to qualify their teams based on the number of allocated spots provided by USSF. The USSF then announced that starting with the 2016 tournament, the organization (USSF) would organize and control amateur qualifying. Qualifying would be completed in the fall of the previous year. This would not affect the upper division teams.

Also from 2016 forward, lower-division professional clubs that are owned by higher-division professional clubs, or whose playing staff is managed by a higher-division professional club, would be barred from the competition.

=== COVID cancellations ===
In 2020, the U.S. Open Cup was canceled for the first time ever following the outbreak of the COVID-19 pandemic. The 2020 field would have featured 100 clubs, 62 of them fully professional—both modern-era records. U.S. Soccer initially announced that all 100 qualifiers would be invited back for 2021, but in February 2021, the federation backtracked and announced the tournament would be pared down to 24 teams due to likely schedule congestion. The opening round was ultimately canceled, reducing the field to 16 teams; the entire tournament was ultimately canceled in July 2021, with U.S. Soccer focusing on a full field for 2022.

=== Return ===
On January 25, 2022, U.S. Soccer announced that 2022 would see the largest field in the Open Cup's modern era: 71 fully professional teams, and 103 in total. In addition, starting from 2022, all Division II and III teams would enter in the second round, and MLS teams would have their entry staggered: only eight (the four competing in the CONCACAF Champions League, plus the next two highest teams in both the Eastern and Western Conferences) would enter in the round of 32, while the remainder enter in the third round and would be drawn against winners from the second round. 31 teams played their first-ever Open Cup match in 2022, and Sacramento Republic eliminated three MLS sides to join the Rochester Raging Rhinos and Charleston Battery as the only non-MLS teams to reach the Open Cup final since that league kicked off in 1996. Sacramento lost the final 3–0 to Orlando City SC, who claimed their first trophy since joining MLS in 2015.

=== MLS attempt to withdraw ===
On December 15, 2023, Major League Soccer announced that its teams would no longer participate in the U.S. Open Cup, starting with the 2024 edition, due to fixture congestion. The league intended to send reserve teams from MLS Next Pro instead. This would have been the first year since MLS's inception that its teams did not take part in the tournament. However, on December 20, 2023, the United States Soccer Federation announced that it had denied MLS the necessary waiver to allow affiliated MLS Next Pro teams to play in the tournament. An agreement between the two sides was tempered in mid-February and announced on March 1, 2024. It allowed eight MLS teams to participate with senior squads and eleven to be represented by MLS Next Pro teams. The teams participating in the 2024 CONCACAF Champions Cup would not send teams to the Open Cup. Discussions continued to find a solution for 2025 and beyond.

In 2025, MLS announced its plans for the scheduled tournaments its teams will participate in. Sixteen MLS teams will enter the 2025 U.S. Open Cup, doubling the prior year's input. Due to the truncation of Leagues Cup, MLS' co-created tournament with Liga MX, from all 29 MLS teams in 2024 to just 18 in 2025 to match the 18 in Liga MX, fixture congestion issues had been solved to allow most U.S.-based MLS teams to participate fully. The fates of the other 11 teams is as follows: as San Diego FC is an expansion team and expansion teams generally do not participate in Open Cup, they are not included; eight of the 10 remaining U.S. MLS clubs sent reserves from MLSNP (with Atlanta United, who did not qualify for Champions Cup but is participating in Leagues Cup, and Colorado Rapids, who is in both tournaments, sending no active club representation), as well as MLSNP's independent Carolina Core FC and Chattanooga FC, will take part as well.

Beginning in 2027, all MLS first teams (based in the United States) will once again participate in the U.S. Open Cup. Following the first round in April, all MLS teams will enter in the round of 64 in July and will have hosting priority for that round.

== See also ==
- American Soccer League (disambiguation)
- History of soccer in the United States
- List of U.S. Open Cup finals
- List of U.S. Open Cup winning head coaches
- United Soccer League
