= Alketas Panagoulias =

Greek footballer and manager (1934–2012)

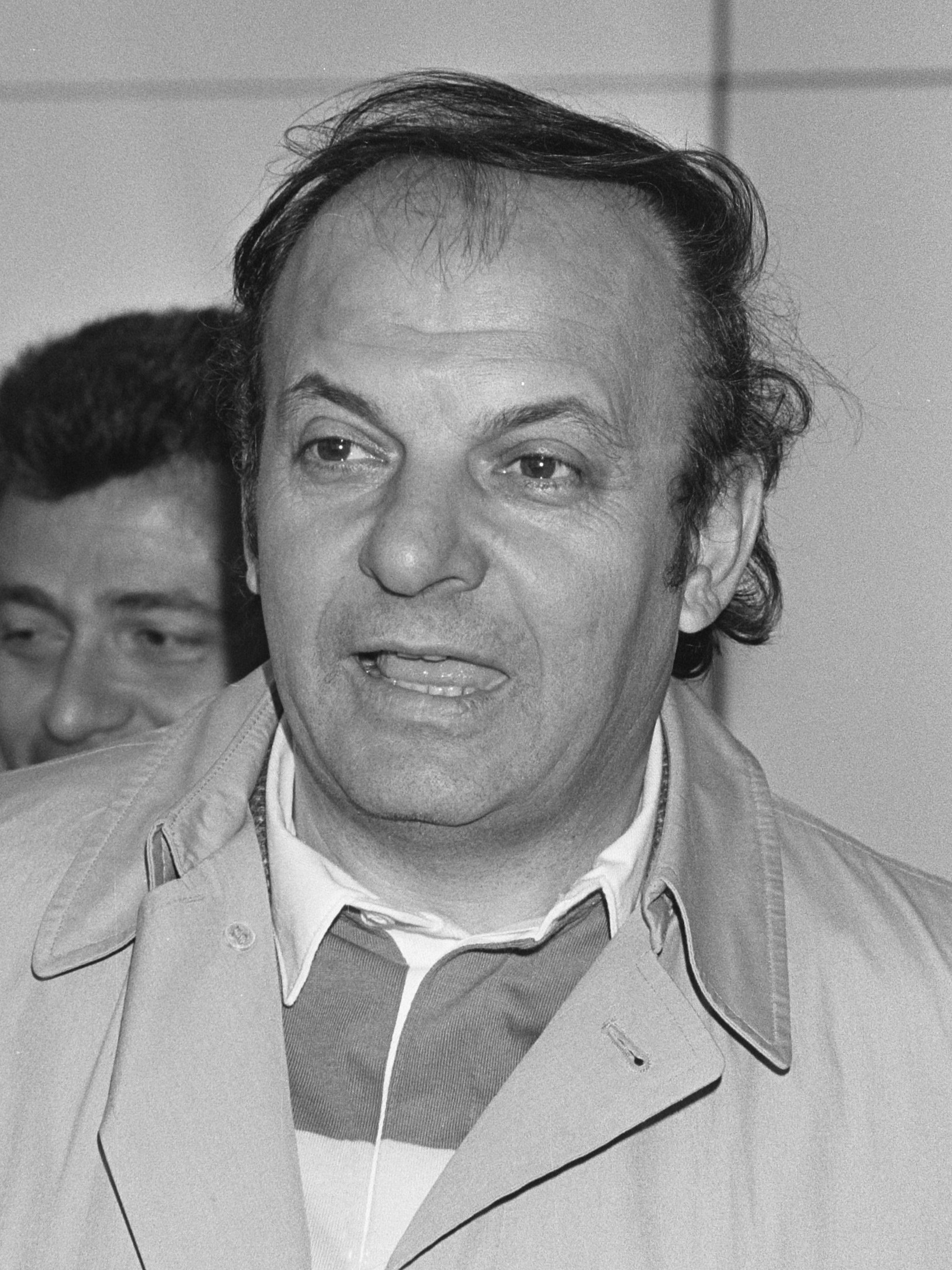
- Panagoulias in 1986

Personal information
- Full name: Alketas Panagoulias
- Date of birth: 30 May 1934
- Place of birth: Thessaloniki, Greece
- Date of death: 18 June 2012 (aged 78)
- Place of death: Virginia, United States

Senior career*
Years	Team	Apps	(Gls)
1951–1962	Aris		
1962–1967	Greek American AA		

Managerial career
- 1967–1971: Greek American AA
- 1972–1973: Greece (assistant)
- 1973–1976: Greece
- 1977–1981: Greece
- 1981–1983: Olympiacos
- 1983–1985: United States
- 1983: Team America
- 1984: United States Olympic
- 1985–1987: Olympiacos
- 1987–1990: Aris
- 1991–1992: Levadiakos
- 1992–1994: Greece
- 1996–1997: Iraklis
- 1998–1999: Aris
- * Club domestic league appearances and goals

Alketas 'Alkis' Panagoulias (Greek: Αλκέτας 'Άλκης' Παναγούλιας; 30 May 1934 – 18 June 2012) was a Greek association football player and manager. He managed the national teams of both Greece and the United States. He also managed several clubs, including Aris, his birthplace team, and Olympiacos with whom he won three Alpha Ethniki championships.

== Early life and playing career ==
Alketas was born in Thessaloniki, Greece on 30 May 1934. Alketas started his football career as a player for Aris.

== Managerial career ==
After finishing his first degree, he moved to the United States, where he attended the University of New York City. There he coached the Greek American Atlas (also known as "New York Greek Americans") to three consecutive National Challenge Cup titles in 1967, 1968, and 1969.

He returned to Athens as the assistant coach of Greece, under the famous Northern Ireland coach Billy Bingham, in 1972; the following year, he took over as head coach, and helmed the team from 1973 to 1981, including Greece's first Euro appearance in 1980, in Italy. (Greece would not qualify for the Euro tournament again for a generation, until 2004, when they won the championship.) Panagoulias coached Olympiacos from 1981 to 1983, earning the Alpha Ethniki title in 1982 and 1983.

He returned to the United States to become the head coach of the United States, from 1983 to 1985. A professional version of the USMNT, called Team America, played in the North American Soccer League in 1983, based out of RFK Stadium in Washington, D.C. After many American stars refused to leave their NASL clubs to play for them, however, Team America could only manage a 10–20 record (and a last place finish) with a patchwork lineup. The following year, Panagoulias led the USA squad in the 1984 Summer Olympics in Los Angeles, with a 1–1–1 record in the group stage, not sufficient to advance to the next round. After failing to qualify for the 1986 FIFA World Cup in 1985, Panagoulias resigned as USMNT coach.

Panagoulias subsequently returned to Athens to coach Olympiacos, winning another title in 1987. He also led Aris from 1987 to 1990 and Levadiakos from 1991 to 1992. He returned as head coach of the Greece national team in 1992 and led the team to its first appearance in a World Cup in 1994, played in his adopted country (by now, Panagoulias was an American citizen). Although he was very popular among Greek fans at the time, the team's poor performance in World Cup '94 (losing all three matches by a combined score of 0–10) attracted widespread criticism, and Panagoulias was replaced by Kostas Polychroniou. He later coached Iraklis in 1997 and Aris from 1998 to 1999.

== Later career ==
Following his retirement from coaching, Panagoulias served as President of Aris in 2001. During the 2004 Athens Olympic Games, he served as venue manager for the soccer events held in Athens. His biography, was published in Greece in November 2007.

He was elected member of the city council of Thessaloniki, and was a candidate for the Greek Parliament in 1993. He was a FIFA instructor, a National Faculty member of the US Academy of Sports and a member of the USSF Coaches Council.

In 2014, the side street adjacent to the stadium of Aris (Kleanthis Vikelidis Stadium), was named after him following a decision by the City Council of the Municipality of Thessaloniki.

Panagoulias died at his home in USA, at the age of 78.

== Honours ==
=== Club ===
Aris

- EPSM Championship: 1952–53, 1958–59

Greek American AA

- National Challenge Cup: 1967

=== Manager ===
Greek American AA

- National Challenge Cup: 1968, 1969

Olympiacos

- Alpha Ethniki: 1981–82, 1982–83, 1986–87
- Greek Super Cup: 1987
