= 1948 National Amateur Cup =

The National Amateur Cup is an American soccer competition open to all amateur teams affiliated with the United States Soccer Federation (USSF).

The 1948 National Amateur Cup had a grand total of 166 entries. Fall River Ponta Delgada emerged victorious for the third straight year and fourth overall. This year they defeated the Curry Vets of Broughton, Pennsylvania 4–1 in the championship game.

== Eastern Division ==
Round of 16
March 28
Ponta Delgada	5
Fall River F.C.	3
March 28
Panthers A.C.	1
Bucky's Cafe	3
April 4
Fairlawn Rovers	4
Portuguese S.C.	1
November 30
Ludlow Lusitano	7
Boston Internationals	1
April 4
German Hungarian	6
Sada F.C.	0
April 4
Eintracht	2
Segura	0
April 4
Phoenix	1
Parkville	0
March 28
Lith's S.C.	7
McCann Association	3

Quarter-finals
April 4
Ponta Delgada	2
Bucky's Cafe	1
April 11
Fairlawn Rovers	2
Ludlow Lusitano	4
Apr 11, 18
German Hungarian	1-1
Eintracht	2-3
April 18
Phoenix	1
Lith's S.C.	2

Semi-finals
April 18
Ponta Delgada	1
Ludlow Lusitano	0
April 25
Eintracht	3
Lith's S.C.	0

Final
May 16
Ponta Delgada	3
Eintracht	0

== Western Division ==
Round of 16
February 8
Curry Vets	4
Heidelberg	0
Feb 29/Mar 7
Alexis Florist	4-1
UAW-CIO Local 200	4-0
December 28
Kelly Celtic	1
Rochester Thistles	2
December 28
Castle Shannon 1	3
Morgan	2
February 22
Steamfitters	7
Mulhauser	2
February 28
Simpkins Ford	5
Holy Trinity	0
March 14
Sparta A.B.A	2
Schwaben	3
February 29
Richard Rich Tigers	w/o
Croatian Eagles

Quarter-finals
March 21
Curry Vets	7
Alexis Florist	1
February 8
Rochester Thistles	2
Castle Shannon 1	3
March 7
Steamfitters	3
Simpkins Ford	2
March 21
Schwaben	2
Richard Rich Tigers	0

Semi-finals
March 28
Curry Vets	1
Castle Shannon 1	0
March 28
Steamfitters	7
Schwaben	1

Final
April 18
Curry Vets	4
Steamfitters	0

== Final ==
May 23, 1948

Ponta Delgada (MA)	4–1	Curry Vets (PA)
Valentine 36'; Joe Czapiga 65'; Travis 75'; Willie Silva 80'	(Report)	90' PK Grivnow

Ponta Stadium; Tiverton, Rhode Island
Attendance: 2747
Referee: Sam Galin

== See also ==
- 1948 National Challenge Cup
