= Handlan's Park =

Baseball venue in Missouri, United States

Coordinates: 38.6336°N 90.2328°W

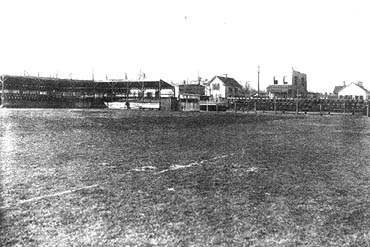
- Interactive map of Handlan's Park
- Former names: High School Field
- Address: St. Louis, MO; U.S.
- Owner: Alexander H. Handlan & family (1914–61); St. Louis University (1961–?)
- Capacity: 15,000
- Type: Ballpark
- Surface: Grass
- Field size: Left: 325 feet (99 m); Center: 375 feet (114 m); Right: 300 feet (91 m)
- Current use: Baseball; Soccer (1918, 1923–24)

Construction
- Opened: 1914
- Demolished: 1923; 103 years ago (destroyed by fire)
- Cost: $32,000
- Builder: Steininger

Tenants
- St. Louis Terriers (Federal League) (1914–15); Saint Louis Billikens football (1915–?); Sumner High School; St. Louis Giants (Negro League) (1920–21); U.S. Open Cup finals (1918, 1923)

Handlan's Park is a former baseball ground located in St. Louis, Missouri. The ground was home to the St. Louis Terriers of the Federal League in 1914 and 1915, and was also known as "Federal League Park".

After the Federal League folded, it was used as the "St. Louis University Athletic Field", and was also known as "High School Field" in the 1920s. During that period, the local Sumner High School and Lincoln University baseball clubs held an annual Decoration Day contest there. The St. Louis Giants of the Negro National League played some games there in 1920 and 1921, although that club had its own park on North Broadway, and again in 1922 while awaiting completion of the new Stars Park.

== Overview ==
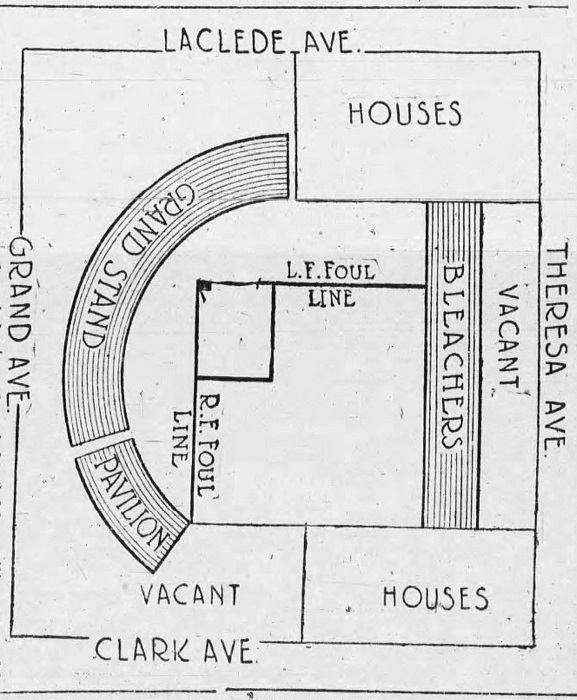
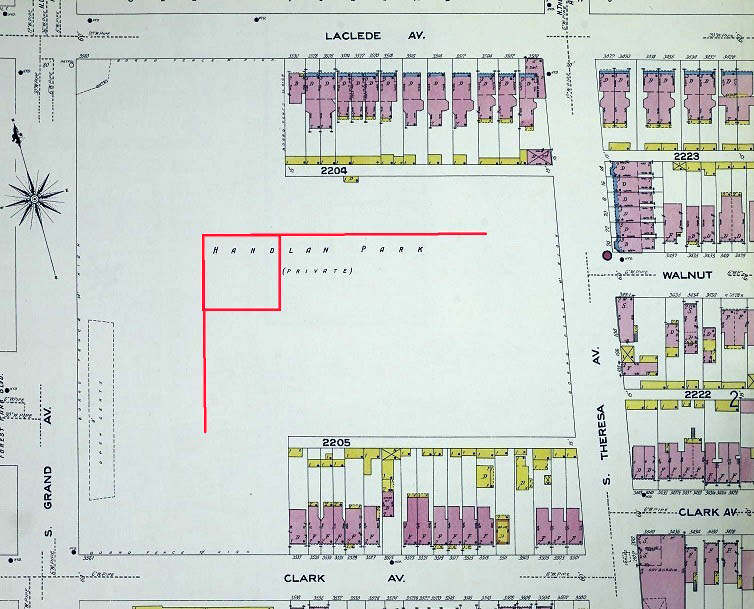
(Left): Rough plan for Federal League play at Handlan's Park, 1914; (right): Handlan's Park as it looked in 1908, with approximate 1914 diamond layout added

Surrounded by Grand Avenue on the west, Laclede Avenue on the north, Theresa Avenue to the east, and Clark Avenue to the south, the space used for the park was owned by Alexander H. Handlan. The head of an international railway supply house, Handlan-Buck Manufacturing, Handlan operated a private park at the site aptly named Handlan's Park. The field's location was about a quarter-mile northwest of the site of Red Stocking Baseball Park from the 1870s.

The seating capacity of 15,000 comprised the grandstand at the southeast corner of Laclede and Grand, the pavilion situated near Grand and Clark, and bleachers stretching behind center field between two rows of houses, which were barricaded by tall wooden fences. Home plate was centered in front of the grandstand at Grand and Laclede. Most sources give the playing field's dimensions as 325 feet (99 m) for left, 375 feet (114 m) for center and 300 feet (91 m) for right field. The park was held by the Handlan family until it was finally sold to St. Louis University in 1961.

The St. Louis Chapter of the Society for American Baseball Research (SABR) placed a marker at the site of Handlan's Park, now on the campus of Saint Louis University, on October 17, 2007.

== Soccer ==
In soccer, Handlan's Park hosted three U.S. Open Cup finals in 1918, 1923, and 1924.
