= MLS Next =

Soccer league in the United States and Canada

- Organising body: Major League Soccer
- Founded: 2020
- Country: United States
- Other club from: Canada
- Confederation: CONCACAF
- Conferences: 8
- Number of clubs: 753 (602 academies)
- Website: MLS Next

MLS Next (stylized as MLS NEXT) is a youth soccer league in the United States and Canada that is managed, organized, and controlled by Major League Soccer. It was introduced by the league in 2020.

It is a successor to the U.S. Soccer Development Academy. The system covers the under-13, under-14, under-15, under-16, under-17 and under-19 age groups. The league currently includes 753 teams across 151 clubs.

== History ==
Organized youth soccer affiliated with Major League Soccer began with various MLS academy teams playing in the Super Y-League at its foundation in 1999. In 2007, the United States Soccer Federation created an elite academy league called the U.S. Soccer Development Academy, which featured academy teams of MLS teams, along with several non-MLS academies across the United States and Canada. The intention of the USSDA was to create a top division of youth soccer in the United States and Canada.

On March 12, 2020, as a precautionary measure against the spread of COVID-19, the U.S. Soccer Development Academy suspended its operations. On April 15, 2020, the league ended operations, citing financial difficulty. The next day, Major League Soccer announced the formation of a “new elite youth competition platform intended to provide year-round high-level matches for MLS club academy teams and non-MLS academy teams that previously participated in the U.S. Soccer Development Academy.” Major League Soccer officially announced MLS Next on September 8, 2020, encompassing 489 teams across 113 clubs and six age groups. On September 11, 2020, the inaugural MLS Next matches were held at Dick's Sporting Goods Park in Commerce City, Colorado, between the Colorado Rapids and Real Colorado's respective U-17 and U-19 age groups. The league added 24 new clubs and expanded additional age groups for 16 existing clubs for the 2021–2022 season on June 11, 2021.

In December 2021, Major League Soccer announced MLS Next Pro, a new professional league that will complete an integrated player pathway from MLS Next through to MLS first teams. The league includes 27 teams and played its initial season in 2022.

In December 2024, MLS Next announced a strategic partnership with the Girls Academy in an attempt to foster an aligned development pathway for boys and girls aspiring to reach their highest potential.

In January 2025, MLS announced the expansion of MLS Next with a new competition tier that will feature an additional 1,200 teams from more than 220 clubs across regional divisions, managed by various league operators.

=== MLS GO ===
MLS GO is a development program, teaching fundamentals of soccer to boys and girls from ages 4 to 14, with sometimes playing in games together in a community setting. The program covers 47 states and Washington D.C.

== MLS NEXT Cup ==
MLS NEXT Cup Champions
	U-13	U-14	U-15	U-16	U-17	U-19
2020–21	—		Real Salt Lake	Weston FC	Orlando City SC	Chicago Fire
2021–22	—		Inter Miami CF	D.C. United	Philadelphia Union	New England Revolution
2022–23	—		New York Red Bulls	Atlanta United FC	LA Galaxy	New England Revolution
2023–24	—		Chicago Fire	FC Delco	LA Galaxy	Strikers FC
2024–25	Springfield SYC	Orlando City SC	Philadelphia Union	Real Salt Lake	Inter Miami CF	LA Galaxy
2025–26	Atlanta United FC	Orlando City SC	Cedar Academy Stars-Bergen	Total Football Academy	Orlando City Youth	Columbus Crew

Titles by club
Club	U-13	U-14	U-15	U-16	U-17	U-19	Total
LA Galaxy					2 (2022–23, 2023–24)	1 (2024–25)	3
New England Revolution						2 (2021–22, 2022–23)	2
Chicago Fire			1 (2023–24)			1 (2020–21)	2
Strikers FC	1 (2024–25)					1 (2023–24)	2
Philadelphia Union			1 (2024–25)		1 (2021–22)		2
Inter Miami CF			1 (2021–22)		1 (2024–25)		2
Orlando City SC		1 (2024–25)			1 (2020–21)		2
Real Salt Lake			1 (2020–21)	1 (2024–25)			2
Weston FC				1 (2020–21)			1
D.C. United				1 (2021–22)			1
Atlanta United FC	1 (2025–26)			1 (2022–23)			2
FC Delco				1 (2023–24)			1
New York Red Bulls			1 (2022–23)				1

== Clubs ==
As of February 28, 2025

Club name	Location	Joined
AC River	San Antonio, Texas	2024–25
Achilles FC	Silver Spring, Maryland	
AFC Lightning	Peachtree City, Georgia	2021–22
Albion SC Las Vegas	Las Vegas, Nevada	2021–22
Albion SC Merced	Merced, California	2022–23
Albion SC San Diego	San Diego, California	
Alexandria SA	Alexandria, Virginia	
ASG FC	Tallahassee, Florida	
Athletum FC	Hialeah, Florida	2023–24
Atlanta United FC Academy	Marietta, Georgia	
Atletico Santa Rosa	Santa Rosa, California	2021–22
Austin FC Academy	Austin, Texas	
Ballistic United	Pleasanton, California	
Baltimore Armour	Ellicott City, Maryland	
Barca Residency Academy	Casa Grande, Arizona	
Bavarian United SC	Glendale, Wisconsin	2021–22
Bayside FC	East Providence, Rhode Island	
Beachside of Connecticut	Norwalk, Connecticut	
Beadling Soccer Club	Pittsburgh, Pennsylvania	2021–22
Bethesda Soccer Club	North Potomac, Maryland	
Blau Weiss Gottschee	Middle Villages, New York	
Boston Bolts	Newton, Massachusetts	
Breakers FC	Aptos, California	
California Odyssey Soccer Club	Clovis, California	2021–22
Capital City Soccer Club	Austin, Texas	2023–24
Carolina Core FC	High Point, North Carolina	2024–25
Cedar Stars Academy – Bergen	South Hackensack, New Jersey	
Cedar Stars Academy – Monmouth	Tinton Falls, New Jersey	
CF Montreal	Montreal, Quebec	
Chargers SC	Clearwater, Florida	
Charlotte FC Academy	Charlotte, North Carolina	
Chicago FC United	Glenview, Illinois	
Chicago Fire FC	Bridgeview, Illinois	
Chula Vista FC	Chula Vista, California	
Cincinnati United Premier	Cincinnati, Ohio	
City SC	Carlsbad, California	
Colorado Rapids Academy	Commerce City, Colorado	
Colorado Rapids Youth SC	Commerce City, Colorado	2024–25
Columbus Crew Academy	Columbus, Ohio	
Connecticut United FC	Bridgeport, Connecticut	2024–25
D.C. United Academy	Washington, D.C.	
De Anza Force	San Jose, California	
Diablo Valley Wolves	Concord, California	2021–22
Downtown United SC	New York, New York	2024–25
Empire United SC	Rochester, New York	
FA Euro New York	Brooklyn, New York	2022–23
FC Bay Area	San Jose, California	
FC Boston Bolts	Newton, Massachusetts	
FC Cincinnati Academy	Cincinnati, Ohio	
FC Dallas Academy	Frisco, Texas	
FC Delco	Downingtown, Pennsylvania	
FC Golden State Force	Jurupa Valley, California	2022–23
FC Westchester	Scarsdale, New York	
Florida Rush SC	Clermont, Florida	
Hoosier Premier Academy	Noblesville, Indiana	2024–25
Hoover-Vestavia Soccer (HVS)	Birmingham, Alabama	2021–22
Houston Dynamo Academy	Houston, Texas	
Houston Rangers	Houston, Texas	
IdeaSport Soccer Academy	Kissimmee, Florida	2021–22
Idea Toros Fútbol Academy	Edinburg, Texas	
IMG Academy	Bradenton, Florida	
Indiana Fire Academy	Carmel, Indiana	
Inter Atlanta FC	Atlanta, Georgia	
Inter Miami CF Academy	Fort Lauderdale, Florida	
IFA of New England	Newton, Massachusetts	2021–22
Internationals	North Royalton, Ohio	
Ironbound SC	Newark, New Jersey	2023–24
Kalonji SA (KSA)	Norcross, Georgia	2021–22
Keystone FC	Mechanicsburg, Pennsylvania	2024–25
Kings Hammer Soccer Club	Covington, Kentucky	2021–22
Jacksonville FC	Jacksonville, Florida	
Javanon FC	Louisville, Kentucky	
LA United Futbol Academy	Los Angeles, California	
LA Galaxy Academy	Carson, California	
LA Surf	La Canada Flintridge, California	
Lamorinda FC	Moraga, California	
Lanier SC	Atlanta, Georgia	
Las Vegas SA	Las Vegas, Nevada	2021–22
Lexington SC Academy	Lexington, Kentucky	2025
Long Island Soccer Club	Uniondale, New York	2024–25
Los Angeles Bulls SC	Pacific Palisades, California	2023–24
Los Angeles FC Academy	Los Angeles, California	
Los Angeles Soccer Club	West Covina, California	2023–24
Lou Fusz Athletic	Earth City, Missouri	2021–22
Louisiana TDP Elite	Baton Rouge, Louisiana	2021–22
Metropolitan Oval	Queens, New York	
Miami Rush-Kendall SC	Miami, Florida	
Michigan Jaguars	Novi, Michigan	
Michigan Wolves	Farmington Hills, Michigan	
Midwest United FC	Kentwood, Michigan	
Minnesota United FC	Minneapolis, Minnesota	
Modesto Ajax United	Modesto, California	2023–24
Murrieta Soccer Academy	Murrieta, California	
Napa United	Napa, California	
Nashville SC Academy	Nashville, Tennessee	
Nashville United	Brentford, Tennessee	2023–24
NEFC	Mendon, Massachusetts	
New England Revolution Academy	Foxborough, Massachusetts	
NYCFC Academy	Orangeburg, New York	
New York Red Bulls Academy	Whippany, New Jersey	
New York SC	Purchase, New York	
Nomads	San Diego, California	
Oakwood SC	Glastonbury, Connecticut	
Orlando City SC Academy	Orlando, Florida	
Orlando City Soccer School South	Kissimmee, Florida	2021–22
Orlando City Soccer School – Seminole	Sanford, Florida	
PA Classics	Manheim, Pennsylvania	
Philadelphia Union Academy	Wayne, Pennsylvania	
Phoenix Rising FC	Phoenix, Arizona	
Players Development Academy	Somerset, New Jersey	
Portland Timbers Academy	Portland, Oregon	
Queen City Mutiny	Charlotte, North Carolina	2021–22
Real Colorado	Centennial, Colorado	
Real Jersey FC	Medford, New Jersey	
Real Salt Lake Academy	Herriman, Utah	
RSL Arizona	Tempe, Arizona	
RSL Arizona – Mesa	Mesa, Arizona	2022–23
Sacramento Republic FC	Sacramento, California	
Sacramento United	Sacramento, California	2022–23
San Antonio FC	San Antonio, Texas	
San Francisco Glens	San Francisco, California	
San Francisco Seals	San Francisco, California	2022–23
San Jose Earthquakes Academy	Santa Clara, California	
Santa Barbara SC	Santa Barbara, California	
SC Del Sol	Phoenix, Arizona	
SC Wave	Franklin, Wisconsin	2021–22
Seacoast United	Hampton, New Hampshire	
Seattle Sounders FC Academy	Tukwila, Washington	
Shattuck-St. Mary's	Faribault, Minnesota	
Sheriffs Futbol Club	Hayward, California	
Silicon Valley SA	Palo Alto, California	
SoCal Reds FC	Irvine, California	2022–23
Sockers FC Chicago	Palatine, Illinois	
Solar SC	Allen, Texas	
South Florida FA	Boca Raton, Florida	
Southern Soccer Academy	Atlanta, Georgia	
Southern States Soccer Club	Hattiesburg, Mississippi	2024–25
Sporting Athletic Club	Wilmington, Delaware	2023–24
Sporting Kansas City Academy	Kansas City, Kansas	
Sporting City	Kansas City, Missouri	
Springfield South County Youth Club	Springfield, Virginia	
Strikers FC	Irvine, California	2021–22
St. Louis City SC	St. Louis, Missouri	2021–22
St. Louis Scott Gallagher	Fenton, Missouri	
Tampa Bay United Rowdies	Tampa, Florida	
Tormenta FC	Statesboro, Georgia	2021–22
Toronto FC Academy	Toronto, Ontario	
Total Futbol Academy	Los Angeles, California	
Total Football Club	Katy, Texas	
Triangle United Soccer	Chapel Hill, North Carolina	2022–23
TSF Academy	Lincoln Park, New Jersey	
Valeo Futbol Club	Newton, Massachusetts	
West Virginia Soccer	Shepherdstown, West Virginia	2023–24
Vancouver Whitecaps FC Academy	Vancouver, British Columbia	
VARDAR Soccer Club	Rochester Hills, Michigan	
Ventura County Fusion	Ventura County, California	
Wake Futbol Club	Holly Springs, North Carolina	2021–22
West Florida Flames	Brandon, Florida (Greater Tampa Bay Area)	
Weston FC	Weston, Florida	
Woodside Soccer Club Crush	Redwood City, California	2021–22
