= List of U.S. Open Cup winning head coaches =

This is a list of U.S. Open Cup winning head coaches since 1995.

== History ==
The Lamar Hunt U.S. Open Cup is a knock-out, single-elimination tournament open to all men's soccer clubs that are affiliated with the United States Soccer Federation. Teams from across the American soccer pyramid, from the top division of Major League Soccer to the bottom tiers of the United States Adult Soccer Association are eligible to participate. Clubs that are in higher tiers of the soccer pyramid earn byes to deeper rounds of the tournament.

Inaugurated in 1913, it is the oldest active competition in American soccer. The tournament was founded as the National Challenge Cup, and gained quick prominence as the premier competition in the United States. Its importance was due to the formation of regional leagues without a true top-division soccer league that was open to all sectors of the nation.

== Winning head coaches ==
Final	Winning head coach	Nationality	Club	Ref.
1995	Dennis Viollet	England	Richmond Kickers	
1996	Bruce Arena	United States	D.C. United	
1997	Dave Dir	United States	Dallas Burn	
1998	Bob Bradley	United States	Chicago Fire	
1999	Pat Ercoli	Canada	Rochester Rhinos	
2000	Bob Bradley	United States	Chicago Fire	
2001	Sigi Schmid	Germany	Los Angeles Galaxy	
2002	Greg Andrulis	United States	Columbus Crew	
2003	Dave Sarachan	United States	Chicago Fire	
2004	Bob Gansler	United States	Kansas City Wizards	
2005	Steve Sampson	United States	Los Angeles Galaxy	
2006	Dave Sarachan	United States	Chicago Fire	
2007	Steve Nicol	Scotland	New England Revolution	
2008	Tom Soehn	United States	D.C. United	
2009	Sigi Schmid	Germany	Seattle Sounders FC	
2010	Sigi Schmid	Germany	Seattle Sounders FC	
2011	Sigi Schmid	Germany	Seattle Sounders FC	
2012	Peter Vermes	United States	Sporting Kansas City	
2013	Ben Olsen	United States	D.C. United	
2014	Sigi Schmid	Germany	Seattle Sounders FC	
2015	Peter Vermes	United States	Sporting Kansas City	
2016	Óscar Pareja	Colombia	FC Dallas	
2017	Peter Vermes	United States	Sporting Kansas City	
2018	Wílmer Cabrera	Colombia	Houston Dynamo	
2019	Frank de Boer	Netherlands	Atlanta United FC	
2020	Canceled due to the COVID-19 pandemic			
2021	Canceled due to the COVID-19 pandemic			
2022	Óscar Pareja	Colombia	Orlando City SC	
2023	Ben Olsen	United States	Houston Dynamo FC	
2024	Steve Cherundolo	United States	Los Angeles FC	
2025	B. J. Callaghan	United States	Nashville SC	
2026	Yoann Damet	France	St. Louis City SC	

== See also ==
- U.S. Open Cup
