= Hanson Park (Chicago) =

Park in Chicago, Illinois, United States

- Interactive map of Hanson Park
- Coordinates: 41.9215°N 87.7631°W
- Area: 32 acres (13 ha)
- Owner: Chicago Public Schools
- Public transit: MDW at Hanson Park; 65, 74, 85

Hanson Park is a park in the Hanson Park neighborhood of the Belmont Cragin community of Chicago, Illinois. It is owned by the Chicago Public Schools (CPS), and its 32 acres (13 ha) of land includes three school buildings as well as a sports stadium owned and operated by CPS.

== Overview ==
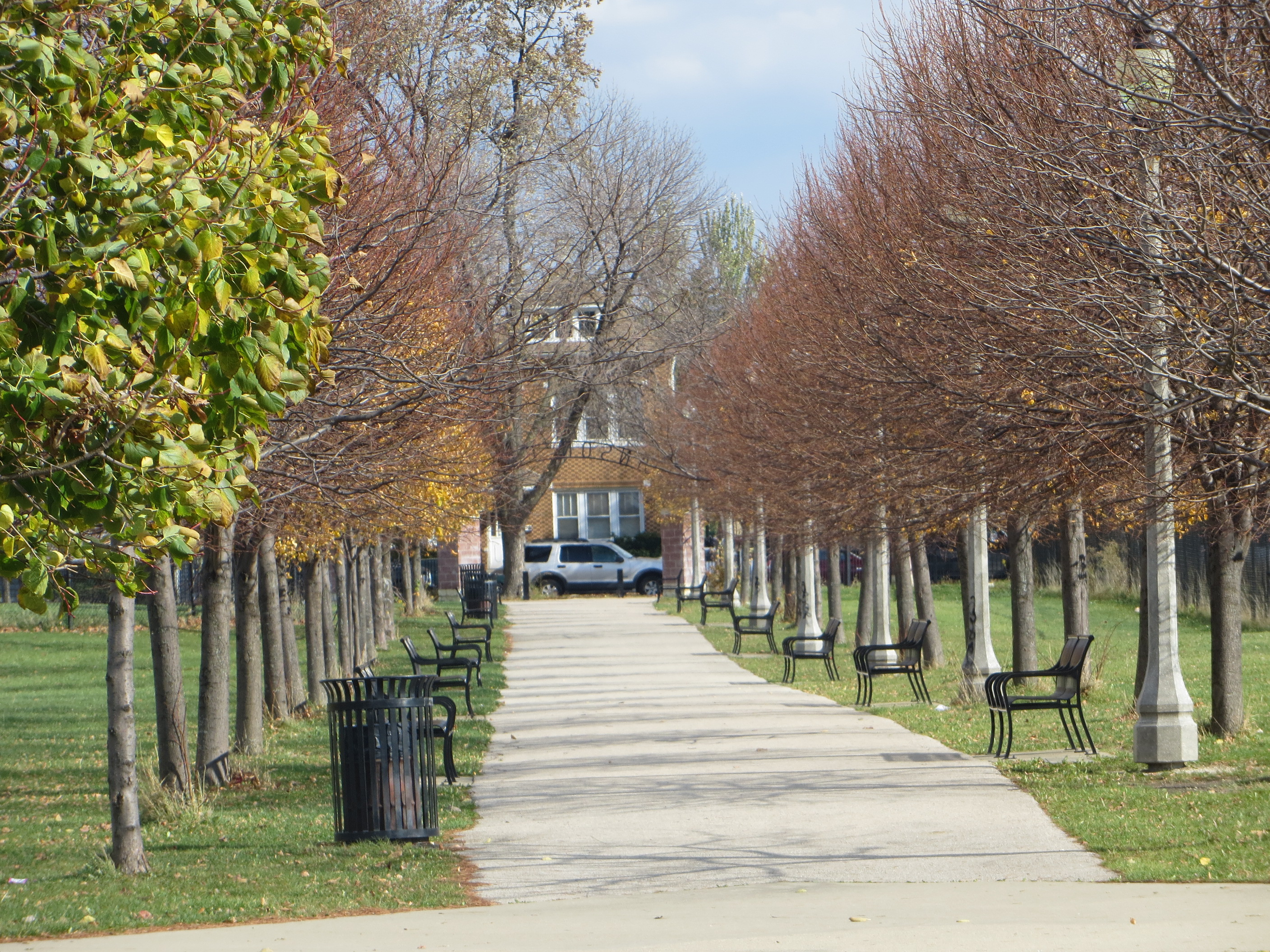
2015 photograph of a segment of the park

The park, located in the Belmont Cragin community of Chicago, covers 32 acres (13 ha) of land. It is named for the Hanson family, whose farm once occupied the land. The park gives its name to the surrounding Hanson Park neighborhood, and the nearby Hanson Park station on Metra's Milwaukee District West Line.

The park is owned by Chicago Public Schools, and not by the Chicago Park District.

== Facilities ==
=== Public schools ===
The park's campus includes three Chicago Public Schools school buildings, which house Hanson Park Elementary School, Prosser Career Academy, and Prieto Math & Science Academy.

=== Stadium ===
Hanson Stadium
- Address: 2233 North Central Avenue; Chicago, Illinois; United States
- Owner: Chicago Public Schools
- Operator: Chicago Public Schools
- Capacity: 10,000
- Type: Stadium
- Current use: Football, Soccer, track and field
- Public transit: MDW at Hanson Park; 65, 74, 85

Construction
- Renovated: 2025

Tenant
- Chicago Public League; Chicago Cats (ASL), 1975–1976; Chicago Circle Chikas football (NAIA), 1967

Inside of Hanson Park is Hanson Stadium, one of seven stadiums operated by Chicago Public Schools (CPS), which play host to Chicago Public League sporting events.

Past tenants of the stadium include the Chicago Cats of the American Soccer League, who played there in 1975 and 1976. In 1965, 1968, and 1982, the stadium hosted the final match of the U.S. Open Cup. By the late 1970s, Astro Turf had been installed at the stadium.

The stadium, which had fallen into poor repair and infrequent use by the early 2020s, was renovated in 2025. While it sat 2,000 spectators prior to the renovation, the renovation expanded its capacity to 10,000 spectators.

=== Other facilities ===
Other facilities in the park include a community garden.

== Abandoned proposal for a Chicago Fire FC training facility ==
In June 2021, Chicago Fire FC of the MLS proposed funding private renovations of the park in exchange for constructing its training and practice center on its grounds. The $90 million proposal would major renovations to the park's existing high school sports stadium, the acquisition of an temporary air-supported dome that would enclose the stadium's playing surface during the winter (making it usable year-round), the construction of six new soccer fields (used both by Chicago Fire FC for its own practices, as well as by local youth soccer programs), and the construction of a new three-story structure for the professional team to house various facilities inside. The team made no request for public subsidy in its proposal.

Since CPS owns the stadium and other land needed for the project, the project would have required approval from the Chicago Board of Education in addition to zoning approval from the city government. At the time, Hanson Stadium had fallen into poor repair, and was underutilized. A proposed deal between CPS and the team fell-through, and the team abandoned these plan in December 2021. Local alderman Gilbert Villegas blamed CPS leadership for the death of the proposal, by failing to facilitate the needed agreements in a timely fashion.
