= Stratis Mastrokyriakos =

Greek footballer and manager

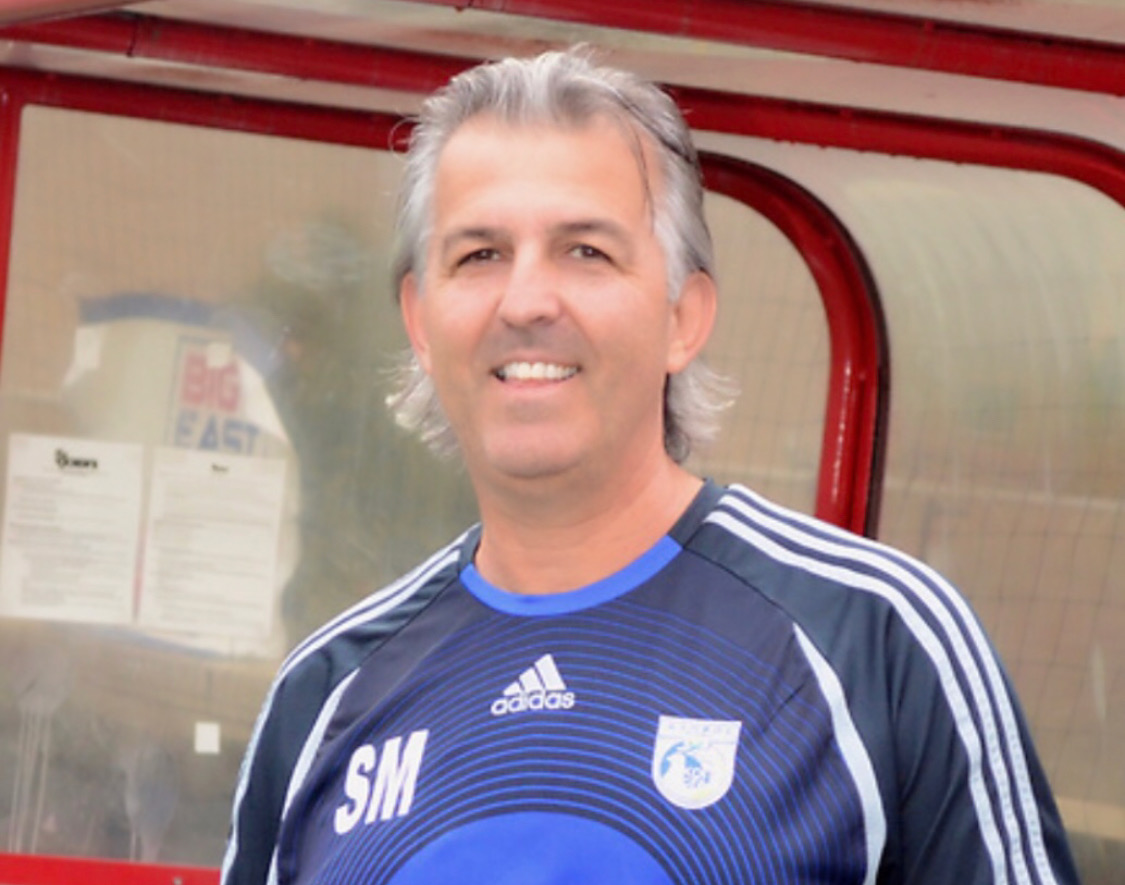
Mastrokyriakos in 2018.

Stratis Mastrokyriakos (Greek: Στρατής Μαστροκυριάκος, born 24 August 1967) is a professional soccer manager - Football coach and former Greek football player, and one of the first Greeks to become a UEFA Pro Licence holder. He was a player for Panegialios FC and the Egio Athletic Association FC.

== Education ==
From 1987 to 1991, Mastrokyriakos studied at the University of Applied Sciences, Karpenisi, & the University of Applied Sciences Messologi. He also received several football diplomas: the Hellenic Football Federation Licence (1997), the UEFA B Licence (2000), the UEFA A Licence (2003), the UEFA Pro Licence (2006) and Director of Coaching Diploma - United Soccer Coaches (2018).

== Professional head coach career ==
- 2012–present time, NY Pancyprian FC
- 2010–2011, P.G. Panegialios FC
- 2007–2010, A.P.S. Zavlani FC
- 2005–2006, A.P.S. Zavlani FC
- 2004–2005, P.G.Panegialios FC
- 2001–2004, Achaea Football Clubs Association
- 1995–2001, A.E. Egio FC

== Honours ==
- National Amateur Cup Eastern New York State Soccer Association Champion 2020
- Cosmopolitan Soccer League Champion 2019
- Amateur Cup Eastern New York State Soccer Association Champion 2019
- Eastern New York State Soccer Association Champion 2019
- Paraglia Cup Eastern New York State Soccer Association Champion 2019
- UEFA Regions' Cup Greece Champions 2004
