= 1983 National Challenge Cup =

- Dewar Challenge Cup

Tournament details
- Country: United States

Final positions
- Champions: New York Pancyprian-Freedoms (3rd title)
- Runners-up: St. Louis Kutis S.C.
- 1984 CONCACAF Champions' Cup: New York Pancyprian-Freedoms

The 1983 National Challenge Cup was the 70th edition of the USSF's annual open soccer championship. Teams from the North American Soccer League declined to participate. New York Pancyprian-Freedoms defeated St. Louis Kutis SC in the final game. The score was 4–3.

It would be the final time in the 20th century that a club would consecutively win the National Cup. The next time it would happen was when the Seattle Sounders FC won the 2010 title.
