= Metropolitan Oval =

Park in Queens, New York

Coordinates: 40°42′52.68″N 73°54′23.31″W

- Met Oval
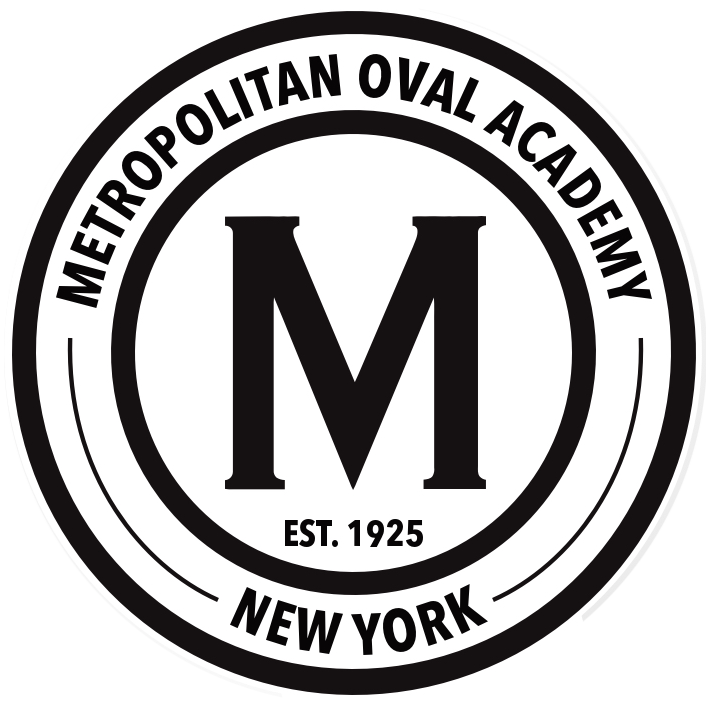

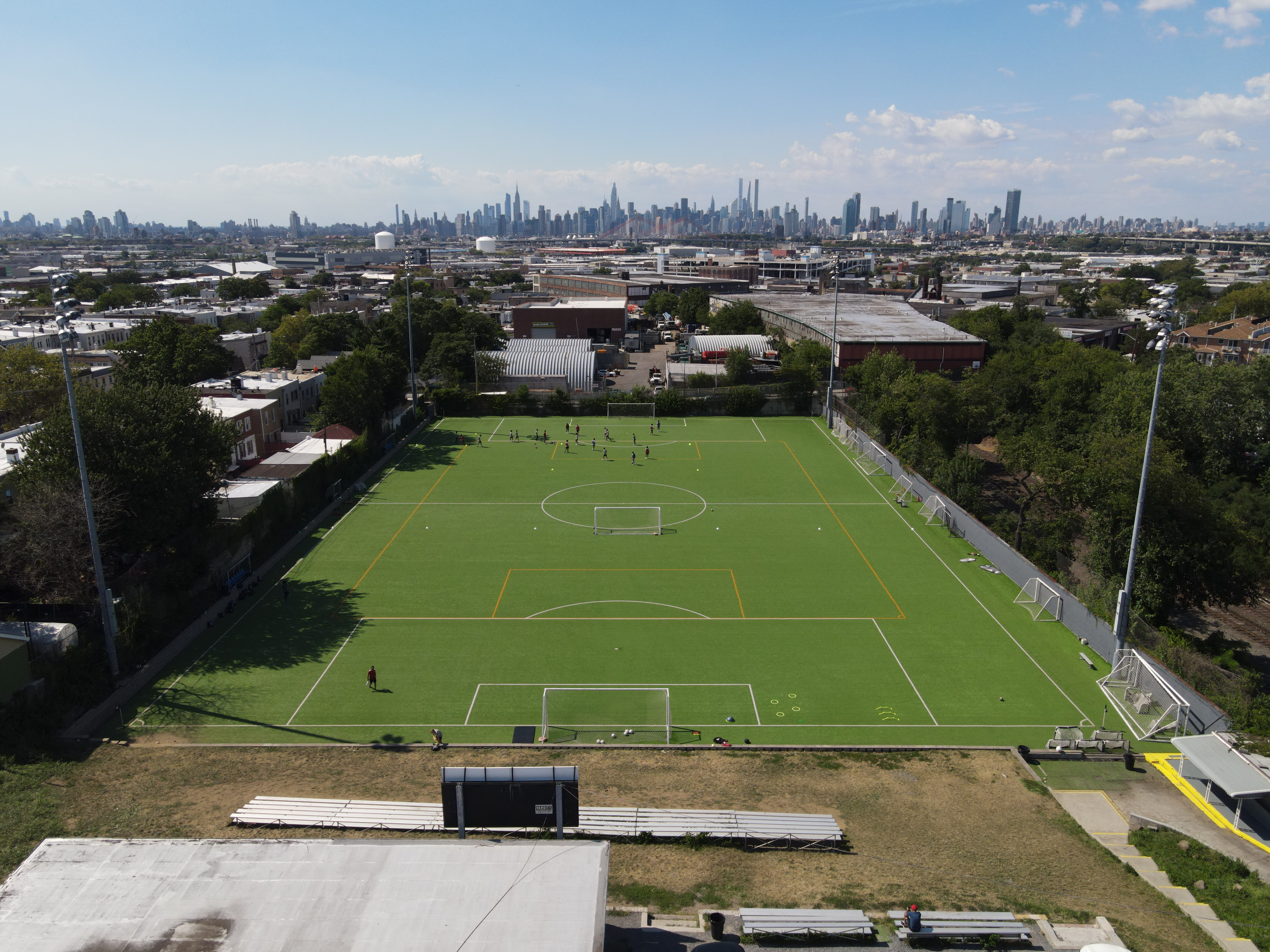
- Aerial view of the complex in 2022
- Interactive map of Metropolitan Oval
- Address: Maspeth, NY; U.S.
- Type: Sports complex
- Surface: Artificial turf
- Current use: Soccer

Construction
- Opened: 1925; 101 years ago

Tenants
- Metropolitan Oval Academy; U.S. Open Cup finals (1951, 1974, 1980)

Website
- metropolitanoval.org

The Metropolitan Oval, also known as Met Oval, is a soccer complex located in Maspeth, Queens in New York City. The Met Oval is the oldest continuously used soccer facility in the United States. Village Voice named the complex, which takes up 4.2 acres (17,000 m^{2}), the "Best full soccer field in the middle of a residential neighborhood" in 2004, for its "pristine" playing surface and the view of the Manhattan skyline.

In addition, the Metropolitan Oval is a MLS Next member. The Metropolitan Oval Academy and facility is led by an all-volunteer Board of Directors. Jon Burklo serves as the Technical Director of the Academy.

== History ==
The Metropolitan Oval was originally built in 1925 by Germans and ethnic German-Hungarian immigrants to be a European style soccer field with facilities. From 1925 onwards, the Oval served as a soccer field for men and boys of all ages and ethnicities. Many U.S. national team players from the New York region played games at the Oval while youths. In 1976 the three-time worlds champions Club Nacional de Football played an exhibition match against Inter Giuliana, the score were favorable for the Uruguayans 4-0.

By the 1990s, however, the Oval was in a state of disarray. Any grass the field once had was gone from overuse. It owed hundreds of thousands of dollars in back taxes and was scheduled for foreclosure by the city.

In response to this state of affairs, the Metropolitan Oval Foundation was formed to save this historic site. The non-profit organization led by Jim Vogt, a longtime Queens native, and Chuck Jacob and Valerie Jacob, two New York lawyers dedicated to the restoration of historic soccer fields across the city, raised enough money to save the field from foreclosure. In addition, Nike and U.S. Soccer Foundation each contributed $250,000 towards the construction of a FieldTurf field and new lights for the complex. The Metropolitan Oval has since been resurfaced in 2024 with Tencate's Pivot Noninfill artificial turf and the lights have been retrofitted with GeoSport Lighting's CLIR fixtures.

Currently, the Oval hosts 3-5 games a week from March to November on the field. The Met Oval Academy plays at this field against other academy teams in the MLS Next, National Academy League, and Elite Development Program leagues.

== Development Academy ==
In addition to being the name of the field, the Metropolitan Oval also helps develop soccer talent in New York City while offering youth of all backgrounds the opportunity to play soccer and receive specialized training, team play, camps and clinics. The academy has teams in age groups ranging from U-6 to U-19.

The Academy is run by Jeffery Saunders. The Foundation is a § 501 (c)(3) not-for-profit, charitable foundation incorporated in 1998 with the mission to: provide youth soccer programs for the New York area as well as to save, restore, and improve the soccer facility, and develop soccer players in the New York area.
