= 1948 National Challenge Cup =

Football cup championship in the United States

- Dewar Challenge Cup

Tournament details
- Country: United States
- Dates: 16 November 1947 – 17 October 1948

Final positions
- Champions: Simpkins Ford (MO) (1st title)
- Runners-up: Brookhattan Galicia (NY)
- Semifinalists: Castle Shannon; Ponta Delgada S.C.

The 1948 National Challenge Cup was the 35th edition of the United States open soccer championship. The tournament had many delays due to weather in the eastern division and by the time Brookhattan had won the eastern final it had to put off playing the national final to entertain touring Liverpool F.C. The championship game was further put off when a number of Simpkins players had US Olympic commitments.

When the final was played, on October 17, Simpkins Ford defeated Brookhattan Galicia 3–2.

== Eastern Division ==
Round of 16
April 4
Kearny Americans	2
Zielinski Association	1
May 2
Elizabeth S.C.	2
Brooklyn Hispano	0
May 2
Ponta Delgada	3
Lincoln	1
April 25
Ludlow Lusitano	9
Boston Internationals	0
March 21
New York Americans	4
Eintracht	3
March 14
Brookhattan	2
Brooklyn Hakoah	0
April 10
Philadelphia Americans	3
Philadelphia Nationals	0
March 21/April 4
Baltimore Americans	3-4
Baltimore S.C.	3-2

Quarter-finals
May 23
Kearny Americans	1
Elizabeth S.C.	2
May 30
Ponta Delgada	4
Ludlow Lusitano	1
April 4
New York Americans	0
Brookhattan	1
May 2
Philadelphia Americans	4
Baltimore Americans	0

Semi-finals
June 6
Elizabeth S.C.	0
Ponta Delgada	2
June 6
Brookhattan	5
Philadelphia Americans	2

Final
June 13, 20
Ponta Delgada	1-0
Brookhattan	2-2

== Western Division ==
Round of 16
January 4
Castle Shannon 1	2
Pittsburgh Indians	1
January 4
Curry Vets	2
Morgan SC	4
January 18
Thistle	3
Kelly Celtic	5
March 7
Pioneer Kickers	2
Bartunek Slavia	1
January 18
Simpkins Ford	2
DeAndreis	1
January 18
So. Equipment	5
Steamfitters Union	2
February 29
Sparta ABA	2
Schwaben	0
April 4
Polish American	10
Richard Rich Tigers	1

Quarter-finals
January 18
Castle Shannon 1	1
Morgan SC	0
March 14
Kelly Celtic	2
Pioneer Kickers	0
February 22
Simpkins Ford	1
So. Equipment	4
April 11
Sparta ABA	3
Polish American	1

Semi-finals
April 4
Castle Shannon 1	3
Kelly Celtic	0
April 18
Simpkins Ford	2
Sparta ABA	0

Final
April 28/May 8
Castle Shannon 1	1-1
Simpkins Ford	3-1

== Final ==
October 17, 1948

Simpkins Ford (MO)	3–2	Brookhattan Galicia (NY)
Bill Bertani 6'; Frank Wallace; Henry Merlo 89'		Joe Gaetjens; Rodolfo Llana 75'

Sportsman's Park; St. Louis, Missouri
Attendance: 2,226
Referee: Jack Maher

== See also ==
- 1948 National Amateur Cup
