= St. Louis Busch Seniors =

American soccer club

St. Louis Busch Seniors were an American soccer club based in St. Louis, Missouri. The club played at St. Louis Soccer Park and won the 1988 National Challenge Cup.
