= 1961 National Challenge Cup =

- Dewar Challenge Cup

Tournament details
- Country: United States

Final positions
- Champions: Philadelphia Ukrainian Nationals (2nd title)
- Runners-up: Los Angeles Scots

The 1961 National Challenge Cup was the 48th edition of the USSFA's annual open soccer championship. The Philadelphia Ukrainians defeated the Los Angeles Scots to win.

== Final ==
June 11, 1961

Los Angeles Scots (CA)	2–2	Philadelphia Ukrainians (PA)
Al Zerhusen 44', 86'		7' Stanly Dlugosz

Wrigley Field, Los Angeles, California
Attendance: 2,000
Referee: Thomas Callaghan

June 24, 1961

Philadelphia Ukrainians (PA)	5–2	Los Angeles Scots (CA)
Herman Niss 7', 18'; Stanly Dlugosz 70'; Herman Niss 73'; John Yakovino		55' John McNally; 89' Al Zerhusen

McCarthy Stadium, Philadelphia, Pennsylvania
Attendance: 6,000
Referee: Thomas Callaghan
