= 1943 National Challenge Cup =

Football cup championship in the United States

- Dewar Challenge Cup

Tournament details
- Country: United States
- Dates: 3 January – 30 May 1943

Final positions
- Champions: Brooklyn Hispano
- Runners-up: Morgan Strasser
- Semifinalists: Sparta S.C.; Philadelphia Americans

The 1943 National Challenge Cup was the 30th edition of the United States Football Association's annual open cup. Today, the tournament is known as the Lamar Hunt U.S. Open Cup. Teams from the American Soccer League II competed in the tournament, based on qualification methods in their base region.

Brooklyn Hispano from Brooklyn, New York won the tournament by defeating Morgan Strasser of Pittsburgh, Pennsylvania in the two-legged final, 2-2 and 3-2.
