= 1944 National Challenge Cup =

Football cup championship in the United States

- Dewar Challenge Cup

Tournament details
- Country: United States
- Dates: 2 January – 14 May 1944

Final positions
- Champions: Brooklyn Hispano
- Runners-up: Morgan Strasser
- Semifinalists: Viking A.A.; Kearny Celtic

The 1944 National Challenge Cup was the 31st edition of the United States Football Association's annual open cup. Today, the tournament is known as the Lamar Hunt U.S. Open Cup. Teams from the American Soccer League II competed in the tournament, based on qualification methods in their base region.

Normally 32 clubs, the field size was smaller due to players fighting in World War II.

The final was a rematch of last year, as Brooklyn Hispano from Brooklyn, New York won the tournament by defeating Morgan Strasser of Pittsburgh, Pennsylvania in the final, 4-0.
