= 1965 National Challenge Cup =

- Dewar Challenge Cup

Tournament details
- Country: United States

Final positions
- Champions: New York Ukrainians (1st title)
- Runners-up: Chicago Hansa

The 1965 National Challenge Cup was the 52nd edition of the USSFA's annual open soccer championship. The New York Ukrainians defeated the Chicago Hansa to win.

== Final ==
June 27, 1965

New York Ukrainians (NY)	1–1	Chicago Hansa (IL)
Jose Cap 87'		20' Willy Roy

Ukrainian Sports Field, Astoria, New York
Attendance: 3,500

July 4, 1965

Chicago Hansa (IL)	1–4 OT	New York Ukrainians (NY)
Willy Roy 5'		25' 97' Peter Schaefer; Peter Smethurst; Walt Schmotolocha

Hanson Park Stadium, Chicago, Illinois
Attendance: 3,434
Referee: John Reega
