= Tom Laris =

American long-distance runner

Medal record

Men's athletics

Representing the United States

Pan American Games
Bronze medal – third place	1967 Winnipeg	10,000 m

Thomas Constantine Laris (/ˈlærɪs/; born June 26, 1940, New York City) is an American long-distance runner who competed in the 10,000 meters at the 1968 Summer Olympics. He finished in 16th place. He had previously won a bronze medal in the same event at the 1967 Pan American Games. Laris's personal record (pr) in the mile was 4:06 in 1972.

Laris also competed in Masters Track and Field.
