= 1968 National Challenge Cup =

- Dewar Challenge Cup

Tournament details
- Country: United States

Final positions
- Champions: Greek American Atlas (3rd title)
- Runners-up: Chicago Olympic

The 1968 National Challenge Cup was the 55th edition of the United States Soccer Football Association's annual open soccer championship. No North American Soccer League teams played in the tournament because it was during the offseason and it was when National Professional Soccer League and United Soccer Association were merging at the time. In the end, New York Greek American Atlas F.C. won its second of three straight National Cups.

== Bracket ==
Round of 16
March 17 - St. Louis
Busch Bavarian | 2
L&L | 1
March 31
Chicago Olympic | 3
Milwaukee Brewers | 0
February 4 - Torrance
Los Angeles SC | 4
Hollywood Stars | 0
March 17 - San Francisco
AAC Teutonia | 4
Seattle Hungarians | 3
March 17 - Buffalo
Simon Pure
Harmarville Hurricanes
Ukrainian Nationals
NY Ukrainian | 3
Eintracht | 0
March 10 - New York
NY Greek American | 2
Blue Star | 1

Quarterfinals
May 12 - St. Louis
Busch Bavarian | 1
Olympic | 2
April 14, 28 - LA/SF
LASC | 3-1
AAC Teutonia | 1-2
Simon Pure | 0
Ukrainian Nationals | 2
March 24 - Queens
Ukrainian | 0
Greek American | 3

Semi-finals
June 16 - Chicago
Olympic | 2
LASC | 1
May 12, 19 - Phi/NY
Ukrainian Nationals | 2-0
Greek American | 2-1

Final
July 21, 28 - Chi/NY
Olympic | 1-0
Greek American | 1-1

== Final ==
=== First game ===
July 21, 1968

| Chicago Olympic (IL) | 1–1 | Greek American AA (NY) |
|---|---|---|
| Alex Naltanis 89' | | Denise Nanos 48' |

Hanson Stadium; Chicago, Illinois

=== Second game ===
July 28, 1968

| Greek American AA (NY) | 1–0 | Chicago Olympic (IL) |
|---|---|---|
| Bob Hatzos 50' |

Eintracht Oval; New York, New York
Referee: Billy Rose
