= New York Pancyprian-Freedoms =

Pancyprian-Freedoms
- Full name: New York Pancyprian Freedoms Soccer Club
- Founded: 1974; 52 years ago
- Stadium: Belson Stadium; Jamaica, New York
- Capacity: 2,600
- General manager: George Halkidis
- Head coach: Stratis Mastrokyriakos
- League: Eastern Premier Soccer League; Cosmopolitan Soccer League; USASA
- Website: eleftheriapancyprian.com
Home colors

New York Pancyprian-Freedoms is an American amateur soccer team based in Astoria, New York, United States. Founded in 1974, the team currently plays in the Eastern Premier Soccer League.

The team plays its home games at Belson Stadium on the campus of at St. John's University. The team's colors are white and blue.

== History ==
The Pancyprian-Freedoms were founded in 1974, and have competed in New York City’s Cosmopolitan Soccer League, a well-respected league which dates back to the 1920s and which is a member of the United States Adult Soccer Association Region I group of leagues, since that inaugural season. The Freedoms have won eight Cosmopolitan League titles in their history, in 1979, 1980, 1982, 2003, 2004, 2008, 2010, 2011, and 2019.

The Pancyprian-Freedoms are also one of the all-time great U.S. Open Cup clubs, and have qualified, or have attempted to qualify, for the Open Cup every year of their existence. They won the cup three times in the pre-Major League Soccer era, in 1980, 1982 and 1983, and following their triumph in 1983 they reached the semifinals of the CONCACAF Champions' Cup in 1984, beating Mexican Puebla on penalties, and overcoming Honduran champions Vida, before they and their semifinal opponents CD Guadalajara were disqualified after failing to agree on the dates of the matches.

The Pancyprian-Freedoms have qualified for the final stages of the U.S. Open Cups in the MLS era on several occasions. They lost 3–2 in extra time to the Real Maryland Monarchs in the first round in 2008, and lost 2–0 in the first round to USL Premier Development League team Long Island Rough Riders in 2010. In 2011 for the Lamar Hunt Cup they lost to FC New York (NPSL) 4–3 in PK's after extra time of a 0–0 regulation time tie after defeating the Brooklyn Italians (NPSL) 2–0 in the first round. In 2016 they advanced to the 2nd Round after beating the Red Bulls U23 (PDL) 2-1 at Belson Stadium (Round 1). In Round 2 they lost to Jersey Express (PDL) 1-0.

In addition to their CSL and USOC exploits, the Pancyprian-Freedoms won the 2008 USASA Open Cup, beating the Arizona Sahuaros 2–1 after extra time in the final in Seattle, Washington. They also won the 2010 USASA Open Cup in Philadelphia, PA beating the Brooklyn Italians (NPSL) 3–1 in the final after besting Detroit FC (MI) 3–0 in the semifinals and the 2011 USASA Open Cup besting AAC Eagles (ILL) 6–0 in the semifinals and Doxa Italia (CA) in the final 5–4 in pk's following 2–2 tie after regulation and 2OT's in Bowling Green, KY.

The current men's team is composed primarily of players that came up through the Eleftheria-Pancyprian Youth teams, the youth soccer division of the Pancyprian Association of New York. The majority of players have played NCAA Division I college soccer, and are now young business professionals or attending graduate school in various fields of study.

The Freedoms share a long-standing rivalry with the Greek American AA, another major New York Hellenic club.

=== New York Freedom ===
After years of competing in the Cosmopolitan League and the U.S. Open Cup, the Freedoms branched out and created a second team – called the New York Freedom – which joined the USL Premier Development League in 1999. The Freedom won the Northeast Division title and advancing to the PDL national semifinals in their inaugural season, and qualified for the U.S. Open Cup, where they upset the Cape Cod Crusaders of the USL D3 Pro League in the first round and nearly eliminated the A-League’s Rochester Raging Rhinos, eventually falling 2–1 in extra time to the eventual champions. The team left the USL in 2003.

== Year-by-year ==
Year	Division	League	Regular season	Playoffs	Open Cup	CONCACAF Champions' Cup
1980	5	USASA			Champions	N/A
1982	5	USASA			Champions	First Round
1983	5	USASA			Champions	Second Round
1984	5	USASA			Did not enter	Disqualified
1988	5	USASA			Semifinals	Did not qualify
1993	5	USASA			Quarterfinals	Did not qualify
2008	5	USASA			1st Round	Did not qualify
2009	5	USASA			Region I semifinals	Did not qualify
2010	5	USASA			1st Round	Did not qualify
2011	5	USASA			2nd Round	Did not qualify
2016	5	USASA			2nd Round	Did not qualify
2017	5	USASA			1st Qualifying Round	Did not qualify
2018	5	USASA			2nd Qualifying Round	Did not qualify
2019	5	USASA			3rd Qualifying Round	Did not qualify
2020	5	USASA			Cancelled due to COVID-19	Did not qualify
2021	5	USASA			Cancelled due to COVID-19	Did not qualify
2022	5	USASA			3rd Qualifying Round	Did not qualify
2023	5	USASA			1st Qualifying Round	Did not qualify
2024	5	USASA			4th Qualifying Round	Did not qualify
2025	5	USASA			2nd Round	Did not qualify
2026	5	USASA			1st Qualifying Round	Did not qualify
2027	5	USASA			3rd Qualifying Round	Did not qualify

== Head coaches ==
- (Cyprus) Marios Laoutas (1978–1981)
- (Greece) Mimis Papaioannou (1981–1986)*
- (Greece) Nikos Exarhidis (1986–1988)
- (Cyprus) Lambros Lambrou (1989–1994)
- (Serbia) Luka Luković (2005–2011)
- (Greece) George Halkidis (2011–2012)
- (Greece) Stratis Mastrokyriakos (2012–present)

*In 1981 he served as a player-coach and from 1982 on exclusively as a coach.

== Honors ==
- Cosmopolitan Soccer League (9): 1979, 1980, 1982, 2003, 2004, 2008, 2010, 2011, 2019
- National Challenge Cup (3): 1980, 1982, 1983
- Participations in CONCACAF Champions' Cup: 1982, 1983, 1984
- USASA National Amateur Cup Champions: 2024

== Stadium ==
- Belson Stadium at St. John's University; Jamaica, New York (2005–present)
