= 1963 National Challenge Cup =

- Dewar Challenge Cup

Tournament details
- Country: United States

Final positions
- Champions: Ukrainian Nationals (3rd title)
- Runners-up: Los Angeles Armenians
- 1964 CONCACAF Champions' Cup: Ukrainian Nationals

The 1963 National Challenge Cup was the 50th edition of the USSFA's annual open soccer championship. The Philadelphia Ukrainians defeated the Los Angeles Armenian to win.

== Final ==
June 2, 1963

Ukrainian Nationals (PA)	1–0 OT	Armenia SC (CA)
Mike Noha 102'

Cambria Field, Philadelphia, Pennsylvania
Attendance: 5,000
Referee: Ray Kraft
