= 2008 U.S. Open Cup final =

2008 final of the Lamar Hunt U.S. Open Cup

- Event: 2008 U.S. Open Cup
D.C. United	Charleston Battery
MLS	USL-1
2	1
- Date: September 3, 2008
- Venue: RFK Stadium, Washington, D.C.
- Referee: Alex Prus
- Attendance: 8,212
- Weather: Clear, 87 °F (31 °C)

The 2008 Lamar Hunt U.S. Open Cup final was played on September 3, 2008, at Robert F. Kennedy Memorial Stadium in Washington, D.C. The match determined the winner of the 2008 U.S. Open Cup, a tournament open to amateur and professional soccer teams affiliated with the United States Soccer Federation. This was the 95th edition of the oldest ongoing competition in United States soccer. The match was won by D.C. United, who defeated Charleston Battery 2–1. Ian Fuller scored Charleston's only goal. Luciano Emilio and Fred scored D.C.'s two goals as the club won their second U.S. Open Cup title.

Charleston Battery entered the tournament as only the second club in the second pro era to make the final as a lower league team, a feat that would not happen again until 2022. D.C. United previously had won the 1996 edition of the tournament and made it to the 1997 finals, where they lost to Dallas Burn (now FC Dallas).

D.C. United qualified automatically for the third round proper of the U.S. Open Cup tournament by finishing amongst the top six in the 2007 Major League Soccer season standings. While United entered in the third round, Charleston Battery, as a USL First Division club, had to start their U.S. Open Cup campaign in the first round proper. To reach the final, United had to win three games, while the Battery had to win five games. D.C. United won the bidding process to host the final.

As the tournament champions, United earned a berth in the preliminary round of the 2009–10 CONCACAF Champions League, as well as a $100,000 cash prize. The Battery received $50,000 as the runner-up.

== Route to the final ==
The U.S. Open Cup is an annual American soccer competition open to all United States Soccer Federation affiliated teams, from amateur adult club teams to the professional clubs of Major League Soccer (MLS). The 2008 tournament was the 95th edition of the oldest ongoing soccer tournament in the United States.

Each year, MLS, which has teams that play in both the United States and Canada, is allowed to enter eight of its U.S.-based teams in the tournament. The top six MLS teams from the previous season's league table qualify automatically for the tournament, while the remaining two spots are determined by preliminary qualification matches. D.C. United, who finished first in the regular season, earned a direct bye into the third round proper.

For the then-second tier USL First Division, the league was allowed to enter all of its U.S.-based teams into the tournament. Unlike MLS clubs, who enter in the third round, USL First Division sides entered in the first round of the tournament. As a USL First Division club, Charleston Battery entered in the first round.

=== Charleston Battery ===
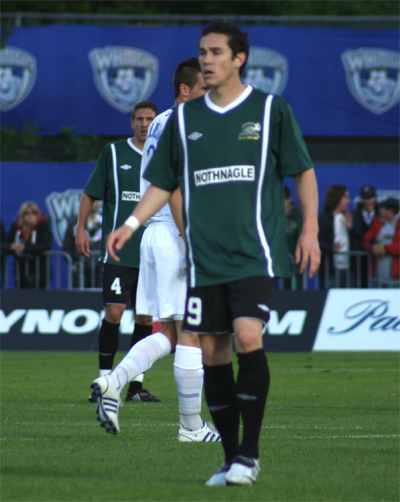
Darren Spicer, was Charleston Battery's leading goalscorer in the 2008 U.S. Open Cup

Until Charleston Battery's run to the 2008 final, the closest the Battery ever came to reaching the final was in 1999. There, the Battery reached the Open Cup semifinals. During their 1999 run, their string of victories included a 4–3 extra time victory over D.C. United, in which was cited as one of the largest upsets in American soccer history, and as well as the starting of a rivalry later regarded as the Coffee Pot Cup.

The Battery entered the competition in the first round proper, playing USASA-side, ASC New Stars of Houston, Texas on June 10. A hat trick from Darren Spicer gave the Battery a 3–0 victory over the New Stars, earning them a berth into the second round of the tournament proper.

=== D.C. United ===
Before 2008, D.C. United had reached the U.S. Open Cup final on two occasions, in 1996 and again in 1997, winning the cup in the former appearance. On July 1, 2010, United began their cup campaign, by hosting the Rochester Rhinos of the USL First Division at the Maryland SoccerPlex in Boyds, Maryland in front of a crowd of 2,752. United defender, Marc Burch scored both goals for United, all in the second half. In the 78th minute, Burch took a low free kick from 30 yards out that opened the score sheet for United. Just moments later, in the 85th minute, Burch tallied his second goal on the night also off of a free kick. The set piece was taken from 20 yards out, which deflected off a wall of Rochester defenders before finding the back of the net.

On July 8, United hosted Chicago Fire, again at Maryland SoccerPlex for the quarterfinals. In front of a crowd of 4,118; United pulled off an extra time 2–1 victory over the Fire thanks to a goal in the 99th minute from Bryan Namoff. The Fire scored the opening goal in the 36th minute, thanks to a brace from Chicago's Daniel Woolard. Woolard, received a long pass from teammate Logan Pause and caught United's defense off guard. Woolard then dribbled around United goalkeeper, Zach Wells to give Chicago the 1–0 lead. In the 77th minute, United equalized thanks to United's Francis Doe received a pass from Jaime Moreno and drilled a low shot from 10 yards out. The controversy of the match swirled around a brawl between Chicago's Cuauhtémoc Blanco and D.C.'s Marc Burch. According to reports, Blanco was ejected for punching Burch in the 108th minute, while Burch was subsequently ejected for retaliating against Blanco. Following the match, the United States Soccer Federation banned Blanco from the U.S. Open Cup for two years.

For the semifinal match, United took on the defending champions, New England Revolution. The August 12 match was scheduled at United's main stadium, RFK Stadium. An announced crowd of 6,797 were on hand to see United take on the Revolution. For the match, both sides fielded a mix of starters and reserves. In the 4th minute of play, United scored a quick goal off of Luciano Emilio was successfully converted a cross from Namoff. Thirty minutes later, the Revolution were able to pull one back, from a 34th-minute equalizer from Joe Germanese. The scoreline would remain level through halftime. Three minutes into the second half, United regained the lead, when Santino Quaranta bagged a pass from Moreno. The match continued to play in United's advantage when New England's Wells Thompson earned a caution in the 54th minute, when he collided with United goalkeeper, Wells. Thompson was dismissed from the match in the 71st minute through a reckless challenge on Moreno. The foul was deemed by the center official, Jorge Gonzalez, as a yellow card worthy foul. Since the foul resulted in a second yellow card, Thompson received a red card. Ten minutes later, Emilio gave United a 3–1 lead in the 81st minute by heading a cross from Iván Guerrero.

The 3–1 victory against New England sealed United a spot in their first Open Cup final since 1997.

== Match details ==
September 3, 2008
7:30 ET

Charleston Battery (South Carolina) (USL-1)	1–2	(Washington, D.C.) D.C. United (MLS)
Fuller 10'; Nylen (yellow card) 33'; Alonso (yellow card) 62'	Report 1 Report 2	Emilio 4'; Martínez (yellow card) 35'; Simms (yellow card) 46'; Fred 50'

RFK Stadium
Washington, D.C.
Attendance: 8,212
Referee: Mark Geiger

Charleston Battery	D.C. United
