= 1969 National Challenge Cup =

- Dewar Challenge Cup

Tournament details
- Country: United States
- Dates: 5 January – 29 June 1969

Final positions
- Champions: Greek American AA (3rd title)
- Runners-up: Montabello Armenians
- Semifinalists: Hansa; Hellenic
- 1970 CONCACAF Champions' Cup: Greek American AA

The 1969 National Challenge Cup was the 56th edition of the United States Soccer Football Association's annual open soccer championship. The Greek American AA team defeated the Montebello Armenians in the final game. As a result, Greek American Atlas won their third consecutive National Cup title. The feat would not be repeated until 2011, when Seattle Sounders FC defeated Chicago Fire.

== Bracket ==
Round of 16
March 23 - San Francisco
SF Scots	2
Heidelberg Beer	1
January 5 - Los Angeles
Montebello Armenians	5
Croatia	2
March 23
Hansa	2
Polonia	0
March 9 - St. Louis
Kutis	1
Good Counsel	0
NY Ukrainian	2
Hota	0
March 2
NY Greek American	3
Blue Star	1
Hellenic
Eintracht
March 16 - Queens
Gottschee	3
German Hungarian	2

Quarterfinals
Apr 27/May 4 - SF/LA
SF Scots	0-1
Montebello Armenians	0-3
May 17 - Chicago
Hansa	1
Kutis	0
March 16, 23
Ukrainian
Greek American
March 23 - Queens
Hellenic
Gottschee

Semi-finals
June 8 - Los Angeles
Montebello Armenians	2
Hansa	1
March 30 - Queens
Greek American	3
Hellenic	0

Final
June 29 - Los Angeles
Montebello Armenians	0
Greek American	1
