= 2026 U.S. Open Cup final =

Final match in U.S. soccer tournament

- Event: 2026 U.S. Open Cup
Columbus Crew	St. Louis City SC
MLS	MLS
0	0
- After extra time St. Louis City SC won 5–3 on penalties
- Date: October 21, 2026
- Venue: ScottsMiracle-Gro Field, Columbus, Ohio
- Referee: Guido Gonzales Jr.
- Attendance: 20,250

The 2026 Lamar Hunt U.S. Open Cup final was a soccer match played on October 21, 2026. The match determined the winner of the 111th edition of the Lamar Hunt U.S. Open Cup, the oldest cup competition in U.S. soccer. The tournament was open to amateur and professional soccer teams affiliated with the United States Soccer Federation. The Columbus Crew hosted St. Louis City SC at ScottsMiracle-Gro Field in Columbus, Ohio. Both finalists are from Major League Soccer (MLS), the top level of men's soccer in the United States.

== Road to the final ==
=== Columbus Crew ===
Austin FC results in 2026 U.S. Open Cup
Round	Opponent	Score
R32	Richmond Kickers (A)	3–0
R16	One Knoxville SC (H)	4–1
QF	New York City FC (H)	1–0
SF	Orlando City SC (H)	2–1
Key: (H) = Home; (A) = Away

=== St. Louis City SC ===
Nashville SC results in 2026 U.S. Open Cup
Round	Opponent	Score
R32	FC Tulsa (H)	4–0
R16	Chicago Fire FC (A)	2–1
QF	Houston Dynamo FC (H)	2–2 (a.e.t.) (4–2 p)
SF	Colorado Rapids (A)	3–0
Key: (H) = Home; (A) = Away

== Match ==
=== Details ===
October 21, 2026
20:00 EDT

Columbus Crew (Ohio)	0–0 (a.e.t.)	(Missouri) St. Louis City SC
	Report
Penalties
Rodríguez (penalty missed); Amundsen (penalty scored); Tapia (penalty scored); Herrera (penalty scored)	3–5	(penalty scored) Baumgartl; (penalty scored) MacNaughton; (penalty scored) Durkin; (penalty scored) Downs; (penalty scored) Edelman

ScottsMiracle-Gro Field, Columbus, Ohio
Attendance: 20,250
Referee: Guido Gonzales Jr.
