= 1979 National Challenge Cup =

- Dewar Challenge Cup

Tournament details
- Country: United States

Final positions
- Champions: Brooklyn Dodgers (1st title)
- Runners-up: Chicago Croatia
- 1980 CONCACAF Champions' Cup: Brooklyn Dodgers

The 1979 National Challenge Cup was the 66th edition of the USSF's annual open soccer championship. Teams from the North American Soccer League declined to participate. Brooklyn Dodgers S.C. of Brooklyn, New York defeated the Chicago Croatia of Chicago, Illinois in the final game. The score was 2–1.
