= 1980 National Challenge Cup =

- Dewar Challenge Cup

Tournament details
- Country: United States

Final positions
- Champions: New York Pancyprian-Freedoms (1st title)
- Runners-up: Maccabee A.C.
- 1982 CONCACAF Champions' Cup: New York Pancyprian-Freedoms

The 1980 National Challenge Cup was the 67th edition of the USSF's annual open soccer championship. Teams from the North American Soccer League declined to participate. New York Pancyprian-Freedoms defeated Maccabee A.C. in the final game. The score was 3–2.
