= 1982 National Challenge Cup =

- Dewar Challenge Cup

Tournament details
- Country: United States
- Venue: Hanson Stadium (final)

Final positions
- Champions: New York Pancyprian-Freedoms (2nd title)
- Runners-up: Maccabee Los Angeles
- 1983 CONCACAF Champions' Cup: New York Pancyprian-Freedoms

The 1982 National Challenge Cup was the 69th edition of the USSF's annual open soccer championship. Teams from the North American Soccer League declined to participate. The New York Pancyprian-Freedoms defeated Maccabee A.C. in the final game in extra time by a score of 4–3. The final match took place at Hanson Stadium in Chicago.
