= 1967 National Challenge Cup =

- Dewar Challenge Cup

Tournament details
- Country: United States

Final positions
- Champions: Greek American Atlas (2nd title)
- Runners-up: Orange County
- 1968 CONCACAF Champions' Cup: Greek American Atlas

The 1967 National Challenge Cup was the 54th annual national open soccer championship held by the United States Soccer Football Association. The tournament was won by Greek American Atlas of New York City.

== Bracket ==
Round of 16
NY Greek American
Blue Star
Paterson Roma
April 23
Danube Swabian	1
Ukrainian Nationals	2
April 23 - Milwaukee
Milwaukee Brewers	0
Chicago Kickers	1
April 2 - Lemay
Kutis	2
Good Counsel	0
March 5 - San Francisco
SF Greek American	1
Seattle Hungarian	0
March 5 - Los Angeles
Orange County	2
LASC	1

Quarterfinals
April 2 - New York
NY Greek American	1
Blue Star	2
April 30 - Paterson
Paterson Roma	2
Ukrainian Nationals	0
May 14 - Chicago
Kickers	2
Kutis	1
March 12, 19 - SF/LA
SF Greek American	3-1
Orange County	1-5

Semi-finals
Mar 14/May 28
NY Greek American	2-1
Paterson Roma	0-0
June 4 - Chicago
Kickers	0
Orange County	1

Final
July 23 - Queens
NY Greek American	4
Orange County	2

== Final ==
July 23, 1967

Greek American AA (NY)	4–2	Orange County (CA)
John Kosmides 71', 72'; Denis Nanos; Peter Tsalouhidis		George Rabus; Larry Radulski

Eintracht Oval; Astoria, Queens
Attendance: 2,500
