= 1945 National Challenge Cup =

Football cup championship in the United States

- Dewar Challenge Cup

Tournament details
- Country: United States
- Dates: 11 March – 16 June 1945

Final positions
- Champions: Brookhattan
- Runners-up: Cleveland Americans
- Semifinalists: Raftery Painters; Brooklyn Hispano

The 1945 National Challenge Cup was the 32nd edition of the United States Football Association's annual open cup. Brookhattan was the winner, defeating the Cleveland Americans in the two-legged final, 4-1 and 2-1.
