= 1988 National Challenge Cup =

- Dewar Challenge Cup

Tournament details
- Country: United States

Final positions
- Champions: St. Louis Busch Seniors
- Runners-up: Greek-American A.C.

The 1988 National Challenge Cup was the 75th edition of the national soccer championship of the United States.

== Regional semifinals ==
=== Region I ===
April 24 Spartans SC (DC/VA) 3:2 Philadelphia Inter (East PA)
May 1 NY Pancyprian Freedoms (East NY) 2:1 Hellenic SC (MA)

=== Region II ===
Date ? St. Louis Busch SC (MO) W:L Madison 56ers (WI)
Date ? Udinese SC (MO) W:L Ayulta (IL)

=== Region III ===
Date ? Dallas Mean Green (North TX) W:L Galveston International (South TX)
Date ? Soccer City (GA) W:L ??

=== Region IV ===
May 21 Greek-American A.C. (North CA) W:L Fresno International (North CA)
Date ? King Taco (South CA) W:L ??

== Regional finals ==
Result

=== Region I ===
Date ? NY Pancyprian Freedoms (East NY) 3:0 Spartans SC (DC/VA)

=== Region II ===
Date ? St. Louis Busch SC (MO) 4:0 Udinese SC (MO)

=== Region III ===
Date ? Dallas Mean Green (North TX) 2:0 Soccer City (GA)

=== Region IV ===
Date ? Greek-American A.C. (North CA) 1:0 King Taco (South CA)

== National semifinals ==
(St. Louis Soccer Park – Fenton, Mo.)
June 10 St. Louis Busch SC (MO) 2:0 Dallas Mean Green (North TX)
June 10 Greek-American A.C. (North CA) 3:2 NY Pancyprian Freedoms (East NY)

== Final ==
St. Louis Soccer Park – Fenton, Mo.
June 25 St. Louis Busch SC (MO) 2:1 (AET) Greek-American A.C. (North CA)
