= New York Greek American SC =

- Full name: New York Greek American Soccer Club, Inc.
- Nicknames: Atlas, The Greeks
- Founded: 1946; 80 years ago
- Stadium: Hofstra Stadium, Nassau County, New York
- Capacity: 1,000
- Founder: Tom Laris
- Chairman: Nick Bardis
- General Manager: Tony Drizis
- Coach: Jimmy (Eran) Shalom
- League: APSL; Cosmopolitan League
- 2013–14: Champions
- Website: nygreekamericans.com
Home colors

New York Greek American Soccer Club, is an American soccer club from New York City that currently plays in the American Premier Soccer League and in the Cosmopolitan Soccer League. The club was formed in 1946 by Thomas Laris and is one of the most successful clubs in America's annual national soccer tournament, the National Challenge Cup, winning four times, in 1967, 1968, 1969 and 1974. The team is one of the oldest American soccer clubs in existence and plays its games at the Metropolitan Oval in Maspeth, Queens.

== History ==
"Greek American Atlas Astoria", formally "New York Greek American Atlas Astoria Soccer Club", was formed in 1946. The club was founded by Greek-American Tom Laris and would go on to become one of the most successful and longest continually operating teams in American soccer history. The club has a long-standing rivalry with New York's Cypriot team and fellow multiple National Cup champion, the Pancyprian Freedoms. The team currently plays in the 5th tier of the American soccer pyramid, under the USASA in the Cosmopolitan Soccer League. The club plays out of the Metropolitan Oval in Maspeth, Queens and has been a perennial contender in the league, winning five of eleven Eastern New York Championships between 2001 and 2012.

=== National Cup success ===
The Greek Americans have won America's nationwide domestic soccer tournament, the Lamar Hunt U.S. Open Cup, formerly the National Challenge Cup, four times in its history, from 1967 to 1969 and in 1974. The club is one of only two teams, alongside the Seattle Sounders FC, to have won the annual tournament on three consecutive occasions.

While the club had not qualified for the Open Cup since 2005, it returned to the tournament in 2012 but lost in the first round to Reading United of the USL's Premier Development League (PDL), by a score of 2–1.

The Greeks won re-entry to the Open Cup again in 2014 thanks to their USASA Amateur Cup regional championship, being seeded in the second round. They won their first game against PDL opponents, Ocean City Nor'easters, 2–0. before falling to Richmond Kickers in the 3rd round. In 2014, after appearing in three consecutive National Cup finals, Atlas would finally lift the trophy for the first time in their history after defeating Guadalajara FC 4–2 in the final.

== Honors ==
- National Challenge Cup winners: 4

1967, 1968, 1969, 1974

- National Challenge Cup runners-up: 1

1989

- US National Cup Champions: 1

2013–14

- Cosmopolitan Soccer League Champions: 5

2004–05, 2007–08, 2008–09, 2010–11, 2016-17

- Participations in CONCACAF Champions' Cup (4): 1968, 1970, 1990
- Participations in CONCACAF Cup Winners Cup: 1995 (withdrew)

== National Challenge Cup finals ==
- 1967: Greek American Atlas Astoria - Orange County Soccer Club 4-2 (John Kosmides 2, Denis Nanos, Peter Tsalouhidis - George Rabus, Larry Radulski), Stadium: Eintracht Oval, Astoria, Queens, Att: 2,500
- 1968: Greek American Atlas Astoria - Chicago Olympic 1-1 (Denis Nanos 48΄, Alex Naltanis 89΄) & 1-0 (Bob Hatzos 50΄), Stadiums: Hanson Stadium, Chicago and Eintracht Oval, Astoria, Queens
- 1969: Greek American Atlas Astoria - Montabello Armenians 1–0, in Los Angeles
- 1974: Greek American Atlas Astoria - Chicago Croatian 2–0, Stadium: Eintracht Oval, Astoria, Queens
- 1989: St. Petersburg Kickers - Greek American Atlas Astoria 2-1 (Garth Pollonais 46΄, Gordon Singleton 119΄- John Lignos 80΄), Stadium: World Wide Technology Soccer Park, St.Louis, Att: 6,200
