= Morgan Strasser =

Morgan F.C. was an early twentieth century U.S. soccer team from Morgan, Pennsylvania. Morgan is located in South Fayette Township, Pennsylvania. The team became known as Morgan Strasser after Peter Strasser purchased it.

== History ==
Morgan F.C. existed at least as early as 1912 when it won the Pittsburgh Press Soccer Football League. In 1924, it won the first of seven West Penn Challenge Cups. However, it did not come to national prominence until after Peter Strasser purchased the team some time in either the late 1930s or early 1940s. When he did, he changed the name to Morgan-Strasser F.C. At that point, the team took off, winning numerous league titles, state cups, the 1940 and 1943 National Amateur Cup, the 1949 National Challenge Cup.

== Honors ==
National Challenge Cup

- Winner (1): 1949
- Runner Up (2): 1943, 1944

National Amateur Cup

- Winner (2): 1940, 1943
- Runner Up (2): 1942, 1944

West Penn Challenge Cup

- Winner (7): 1924, 1941, 1945, 1946, 1949, 1952, 1954

League Championship

- Winner (6): 1912, 1940, 1941, 1943, 1952, 1954
