= Soccer in the New York metropolitan area =

Location map of professional soccer clubs in New York City

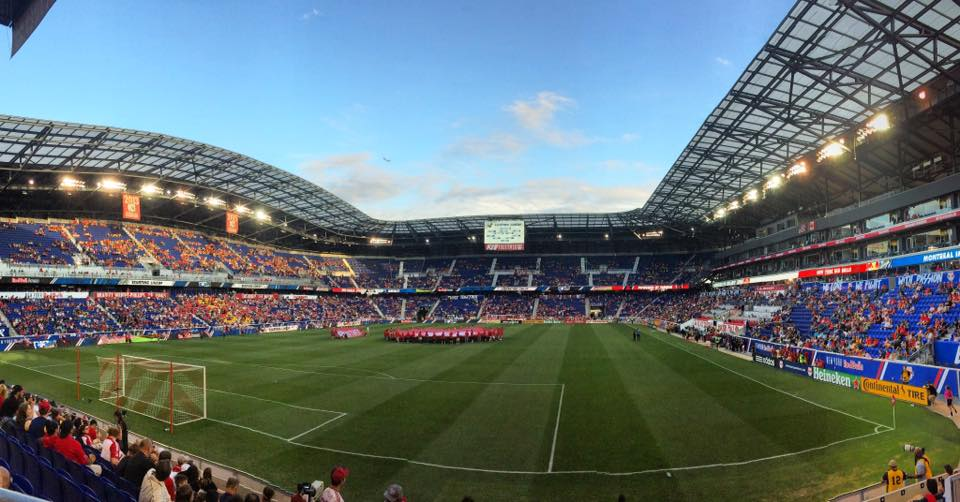
Sports Illustrated Stadium is New York metropolitan area's first professional soccer-specific stadium in the modern era of American soccer.

The sport of soccer has a long history in New York City, beginning in the 1910s with the first iteration of the American Soccer League. In the 1970s, with the rise of the first iteration of the North American Soccer League, the New York Cosmos became one of the most recognizable brands in American soccer.

Presently, there are five professional soccer clubs in the New York City region, fielding six teams in various leagues. New York City FC and the New York Red Bulls play in the top mens division, Major League Soccer, while their reserve teams New York Red Bulls II and New York City FC II compete in the third tier league MLS Next Pro. Also in the third tier is Westchester SC, which plays their matches in Westchester County as a member of the USL League One. There are two first divisions for women in the United States, and both are represented by clubs in the metropolitan area: NJ/NY Gotham FC, a women's team, competes in the National Women's Soccer League while Brooklyn FC fields a woman's team in the USL Super League. Brooklyn FC will also field a men's team in the second-division USL Championship in 2026, both playing in Maimonides Park in Coney Island, with fellow USL club New York Cosmos, the third iteration of the brand, set to join USL League One whilst playing in Paterson, New Jersey.

The region has also hosted 27 U.S. Open Cup finals at various venues including Starlight Park, Triborough Stadium, Dexter Park, the Metropolitan Oval, the Polo Grounds and Ebbets Field. Despite this, a New York City-based club has not won the Open Cup since the 1991 final, where the Brooklyn Italians defeated the Richardson Rockets. The last time a local club reached the final was 2017, where the New York Red Bulls lost to Sporting Kansas City.

Today, major stadiums that host soccer matches include Sports Illustrated Stadium, Yankee Stadium, Citi Field, and MetLife Stadium, which hosted the 2026 FIFA World Cup final. New York City FC is planning to build Etihad Park, the first soccer-specific stadium in New York City which will be located in Queens and opening in 2027.

== Professional clubs ==
Club	Stadium	Capacity	Founded	Notes
Major League Soccer
New York Red Bulls	Sports Illustrated Stadium	25,189	1995	New York's first MLS franchise. Play in New Jersey. Won the Supporters' Shield in 2013, 2015, and 2018.
New York City FC	Yankee Stadium	33,444	2013	Founded by City Football Group and the New York Yankees in 2013. First match played in 2015. Winner of 2021 MLS Cup
National Women's Soccer League
NJ/NY Gotham FC	Sports Illustrated Stadium	25,189	2007	
USL Super League
Brooklyn FC	Maimonides Park	7,000	2024	
USL Championship
Brooklyn FC	Maimonides Park	7,000	2023	To begin play in the 2026 season
MLS Next Pro
New York Red Bulls II	MSU Soccer Park	5,000	2015	New York Red Bulls reserve team. Winner of 2016 USL Cup.
New York City FC II	Belson Stadium	2,168	2021	New York City FC reserve team.
USL League One
New York Cosmos	Hinchliffe Stadium	7,800	2025	To begin play in 2026 in New Jersey.
Westchester SC	The Stadium at Memorial Field	3,900	2024	Plays in Mount Vernon, New York.

== Amateur clubs ==
Club	Stadium	Capacity	Founded	Notes
USL League Two
Cedar Stars Rush	Fairleigh Dickinson University		2018	
F.A. Euro	Belson Stadium	2,600	2013	
FC Motown	Ranger Stadium	1,200	2012	
Long Island Rough Riders	Hofstra University Soccer Stadium	1,600	1994	
Manhattan SC	Gaelic Park		2018	
Morris Elite SC	Rutgers Newark Stadium		2016	
Westchester Flames	City Park Stadium	1,845	1999	
National Premier Soccer League
FC Motown	Ranger Stadium	1,200	2012	Winner of the 2022 National Premier Soccer League season
FC Monmouth	Count Basie Park		2017	
Osner's FC	Belson Stadium		2015	
United Premier Soccer League - Premier
EFA Metro	Lyndhurst, NJ			
FSA Pro	Hudson Sports Complex		2014	
Javier Velasco Soccer Academy	Perth Amboy, NJ			
North Jersey Alliance FC	Weequahic Park		2012	
NY Renegades FC	Hicksville			
NYC Haiti United SC	Brooklyn			
Oyster Bay United FC	Oyster Bay			
Real New York FC	Liberty Park		2014	
Queensboro FC II	Queens			
OSNER'S FC	Brooklyn, NY		2015	
Union SC	Union, NJ			
United Premier Soccer League - Division 1
Academias Barcelona SC	Victory Field, Forest Park			
Amigos FC New York	Long Island		2018	
Astoria Knights FC	Aviator Sports & Event Center	5,000	2018	
Atlas FC NYC	Long Island			
Osner's FC]	Brooklyn, NY		2015	
AYSAB Football Club	Brooklyn			
East Coast FC	Long Island			
FC B3ast	Queens			
FSA Pro II	Hudson Sports Complex		2014	
FTFA Gunners	Elizabeth, NJ			
Galo FC	Long Island			
Ironbound Soccer Club	Newark, NJ			
LDUQ-USA Pro FC Elite	Montvale, NJ			
New Jersey Alliance FC U23	Jersey City, NJ			
NY Hota Bavarians SC	Franklin Square			
Rosedale Soccer Club	Jamaica			
Sons of Queens FC	Woodside			
UCFSC Warriors	Rahway, NJ			
Unisamba FC	Paterson, NJ			
Cosmopolitan Soccer League Division I
Cedar Stars Academy	Ramapo College of New Jersey	5,000	2013	
Doxa FC	Joseph F. Fosina Field	1,000	1962	
KidSuper Samba AC	Baker Athletics Complex	3,500	2017	
Lansdowne Yonkers FC	Tibbet Brook Park	1,000	1997	
New York Athletic Club	Travers Island Soccer Field	250	2008	Played organized since 2008. NYAC founded in 1868.
New York Greek American	Metropolitan Oval	1,500	1941	
New York Pancyprian-Freedoms	Belson Stadium	2,500	1974	
New York Shamrocks SC	Roosevelt Island	150	1960	
Sporting SC	Soundview Park	150	2002	
Zum Schneider FC 03	Randalls Island	150	2003	
Cosmopolitan Soccer League Division II
Afghan FC NY	Randalls Island	150		
Beyond FC	Laurel Hill Park	300	2011	
Central Park Rangers FC	Central Park	100	1999	
DeSportiva Sociedad NY	Randalls Island	150		
FC Japan	Randalls Island	150	1992	
FC Ulqini	Greenbelt Recreation Center			
Hoboken FC 1912	Laurel Hill Park	300	1912	
Kelmendi FC NY	Randalls Island	150	2012	
Manhattan Celtic	Randalls Island	150	1998	
Manhattan Kickers	Randalls Island	150	1973	
New York Ukrainians	McCarren Park	200	1947	
NYPD FC	Flushing Meadows			
Polonia Gwardia NY	McCarren Park	200		
Real Olé FC	Red Wing Park			
Richmond County FC	Corporal Thompson Park		2016	
Stal Mielec NY	McCarren Park	200	2004	
Williamsburg International F.C.	Bushwick Inlet Park		2011	
NCAA Division I
Columbia Lions (Ivy)	Rocco B. Commisso Soccer Stadium	3,500	1906	First recorded game in 1870. Fielded varsity team since 1906.
Fordham Rams (Atlantic 10)	Coffey Field	7,000	1979	
Hofstra Pride (CAA)				
Iona Gaels (MAAC)				
LIU Brooklyn Blackbirds (NEC)				
Manhattan Jaspers (MAAC)				
Marist Red Foxes (MAAC)	Leonidoff Field	5,000	1981	
Monmouth Hawks (MAAC)				
NJIT Highlanders (Sun Belt)				
Saint Peter's Peacocks (MAAC)				
Rutgers Scarlet Knights (Big Ten)	Yurcak Field	5,000	1994	
St. Francis Terriers (NEC)				
St. John's Red Storm (Big East)	Belson Stadium	2,168	1979	Won NCAA Tournament in 1996.
NCAA Division II
Concordia Clippers	Clipper Soccer Field			
Queens Knights	Queens College Track & Soccer Field			
NCAA Division III
Baruch Bearcats				
Brooklyn Bulldogs				
CCNY Beavers				
Hunter Hawks				
John Jay Bloodhounds				
Lehman Lightning				
Medgar Evers Cougars				
Montclair State Red Hawks	MSU Soccer Park	5,000	1958	
NYU Violets				
Sarah Lawrence Gryphons				
Staten Island Dolphins				
St. Joseph's Bears				
Yeshiva Maccabees				
York Cardinals				
CMSV Dolphins				

== Most successful clubs overall ==
Teams in italics are no longer active.

Team	D1 regular season	U.S. Open Cup	D1 Playoffs	Domestic Total	Campeones Cup	Leagues Cup	CONCACAF Champions Cup	Total
Brookhattan	1	2	1	5	0	0	0	5
Brooklyn Celtic	7	3	5	15	0	0	0	15
Brooklyn Field Club	1	1	0	2	0	0	0	2
Brooklyn Hispano	3	2	1	6	0	0	0	6
Brooklyn Italians	0	2	0	2	0	0	0	2
S.C. Eintracht	0	1	0	1	0	0	0	1
Elizabeth S.C.	0	2	0	2	0	0	0	2
New York AO Krete	0	1	0	1	0	0	0	1
New York Americans	1	1	1	3	0	0	0	3
New York City FC	0	0	1	1	1	0	0	2
New York Cosmos (original club)	7	0	5	12	0	0	0	12
New York Greek American	0	4	0	4	0	0	0	4
New York Hakoah	3	1	3	7	0	0	0	7
New York Hungaria	0	1	0	1	0	0	0	1
New York Nationals	0	1	0	1	0	0	0	1
New York Pancyprian-Freedoms	0	3	0	3	0	0	0	3
New York Red Bulls	3	0	0	3	0	0	0	3
Paterson F.C.	1	1	0	2	0	0	0	2
Robins Dry Dock	0	1	0	1	0	0	0	1

== New York derbies ==
There is one current professional New York derby:

- New York Red Bulls vs New York City FC ("Hudson River Derby"):

New York Red Bulls and New York City FC met for the first time in 2015 at the first inaugural New York derby in MLS

== Attendances ==
Soccer clubs in the New York metropolitan area with the highest all-time average home league attendance:

#	Club	Average	Season
1	New York Cosmos	47,856	1978
2	New York City FC	29,016	2015
3	Red Bull New York	23,898	1996

== See also ==
- Soccer in the United States
- Soccer in Houston
- Soccer in Los Angeles
- History of professional soccer in Seattle
