= 1972 National Challenge Cup =

- Dewar Challenge Cup

Tournament details
- Country: United States
- Dates: 9 January – 21 May 1972

Final positions
- Champions: Elizabeth S.C. (2nd title)
- Runners-up: San Pedro Yugoslavs

The 1972 National Challenge Cup was the 59th edition of the United States Soccer Football Association's annual open soccer championship. Teams from the North American Soccer League declined to participate. Elizabeth S.C. defeated the San Pedro Yugoslavs in the final game.

== Bracket ==
Round of 16
March 5 - Queens
NY Hota	2
German Hungarian	4
April 16 - Peabody
Peabody Academica	0
Hartford Hellenic	1
January 9 - Union
Elizabeth S.C.	2
Dalmatinac	0
April 9 - Philadelphia
UGH	0
Baltimore Dnipro	1
February 27 - San Pedro
San Pedro Yugoslavs	4
Condor Hungarians	1
March 5 - San Francisco
Concordia	6
Olympia Vikings	1
April 23 - Chicago
Ukrainian Lions	2
Milwaukee Bavarians	1
March 19 - Wheat Ridge
Denver Kickers	2
Big Four Chevrolet	3

Quarterfinals
April 23
German Hungarian	2
Hartford Hellenic	1
April 23
Elizabeth	3
Dnipro	1
April 2, 9 - SP/SF
Yugoslavs	2-4
Concordia	0-1
April 29 - Edwardsville
Lions	2
Big Four	0

Semi-finals
May 14 - Queens
German Hungarian	1
Elizabeth	2
May 14 - Los Angeles
Yugoslavs	2
Lions	1

Final
May 21 - Union
Elizabeth	1
Yugoslavs	0

== Final ==
May 21, 1972

Elizabeth S.C. (NJ)	1–0	San Pedro Yugoslavs (CA)
Walt Schmotolocha 22'

Farcher's Grove Stadium, Union, New Jersey
Referee: (USA)
