= Lloyd Monsen =

American sportsman (1931–2026)

Personal information
- Date of birth: May 7, 1931
- Place of birth: New York City, U.S.
- Date of death: February 4, 2026 (aged 94)
- Height: 6 ft 0 in (1.83 m)
- Position: Forward

Youth career
- 1947–1948: Gjoa Juniors

Senior career*
Years	Team	Apps	(Gls)
1948–1949	Gjoa	?	(18)
1949–1952	New York Americans		
1952–1953	Hoechst S.C.		
1953–1956	New York Americans		
1956–?	New York Hakoah-Americans		
- Brooklyn German-Hungarians
- Swedish F.C.

International career
1952–1957	United States	5	(0)
- * Club domestic league appearances and goals

Lloyd Monsen (May 7, 1931 – February 4, 2026) was an American soccer forward and baseball pitcher. Monsen spent eleven seasons in the American Soccer League as well as several years in the lower division German American Soccer League and National Soccer League of New York. He earned three caps with the U.S. national team between 1952 and 1957 and was a member of the U.S. Olympic soccer teams at both the 1952 and 1956 Summer Olympics. He is a member of the National Soccer Hall of Fame.

== Soccer ==
=== Youth ===
Monsen was born in Brooklyn, New York, where he grew up, attending Fort Hamilton High School. His soccer career began when he joined the Gjoa Juniors, an ethnically Norwegian team, of the Empire State Junior League when he was sixteen. In his first season, Monsen scored fifty-six goals in both league and cup play leading to his moving up to the Gjoa first team of the National Soccer League of New York when he was seventeen. In his first season, he scored eighteen goals in league competition.

=== Club career ===
Monsen's success with Gjoa led to his signing with the New York Americans of the American Soccer League in 1949. At the time, he was still in high school. He played with the Americans until 1952 when he was drafted into the U.S. Army. While serving in Germany, he played briefly for Hoechst S.C. He returned to the U.S. in 1953, rejoined the Americans where he was selected as team captain. In 1954, the Americans won the league title and defeated St. Louis Kutis S.C. to win the National Challenge Cup to gain a double for Monsen and his teammates. In 1956, the Americans merged with Brooklyn Hakoah to form the New York Hakoah-Americans. The Hakoah-Americans went on to win three consecutive league titles 1957, 1958, and 1959. The team also went to the 1958 National Cup only to fall to Kutis. During the 1957–1958 season, Monsen led the ASL with twenty-two goals. Monsen nearly won his second consecutive scoring title but lost at the last minute to Pasquale Pepe of Newark Portuguese. During his ASL career, Monsen scored ninety-eight league and forty-seven cup goals. He was also 11 times an ASL All-Star. Monsen then moved to the New York German-Hungarians of the German American Soccer League before finishing his playing career with Swedish F.C. of the National Soccer League of New York. He retired from playing professionally in 1964 but remained active with amateur over age teams until 1988.

=== National and Olympic teams ===
His first game with the senior team came in a 6–0 loss to Scotland on April 30, 1952. He did not play again until a 3–2 loss to Iceland on August 25, 1955. His last game was a 7–2 loss to Mexico in an April 28, 1957 World Cup qualifier. Monsen was selected for the U.S. soccer team at the 1952 Summer Olympics. At that tournament, the U.S. lost 8–0 to Italy in the first round. He was again selected to the U.S. team at the 1956 Summer Olympics. This time, Yugoslavia defeated the U.S., 9–1, in the first round.

Monsen was inducted into the National Soccer Hall of Fame in 1994 and the Eastern New York Youth Soccer Association Hall of Fame in 1997.

== Baseball ==
In 1952, Monsen was a member of the U.S. soccer team at the Helsinki Olympics. The team was eliminated in its first game, an 8–0 loss to Italy. The Finnish Olympic Committee put on a demonstration of a local version of baseball then asked the Americans to provide a team to play the locals. The U.S. team asked Walter Giesler, the coach of the U.S. soccer team, to organize a U.S. team. As his soccer players had nothing else to do, they formed the bulk of the U.S. baseball team. This team, with Lloyd Monsen as a pitcher, defeated a Venezuelan team, 14–6, on July 29. On August 5, the U.S. defeated the Finnish team, 19–1, at the Helsinki Olympic Stadium.

== Death ==
Monsen died on February 4, 2026, at the age of 94.
