= 1949 National Amateur Cup =

The 1949 National Amateur Cup in soccer featured 145 entrants (71 eastern and 74 western). Elizabeth of New Jersey won their first national title by defeating the Zenthoefer Furs of St. Louis by a score of 6–1 in the final.

== Eastern Division ==
Round of 16
S.C. Eintracht	4
Hota	1
German Hungarian	5
Prague A	0
Viola	6
Lighthouse Boys	5
Serra	1
Esso	0
Elizabeth	6
West New York	0
New World	1
Albany	0
Ponta Delgada	2
Santo Christo	1
Lincolns	4
Lusitano	3

Quarter-finals
S.C. Eintracht	3
German Hungarian	1
Viola	3
Serra	1
Elizabeth	5
New World	0
Ponta Delgada	1
Lincolns	0

Semi-finals
S.C. Eintracht	7
Viola	2
Elizabeth	2
Ponta Delgada	0

Final
S.C. Eintracht	0-1
Elizabeth	1-2

== Western Division ==
Round of 16
Castle Shannon	0
Toledo Turners	3
Rochester Eagles	2
Gallatin	1
Curry Vets	1-2
Dunlevy Redbirds	1-1
Moon Run	2-3
Avella Bears	2-1
Mulhauser	3
Alpine Sportswear	2
Ace Cab	2
Zenthoefer Furs	3
Hansa	1
Milwaukee Brewers	0
Hakoah Center	0
GIAC Maroons	2

Quarter-finals
Toledo Turners	6
Rochester Eagles	2
Curry Vets	0
Moon Run	2
Mulhauser	1
Zenthoefer Furs	2
Hansa	0
GIAC Maroons	2

Semi-finals
Toledo Turners	6
Moon Run	1
Zenthoefer Furs	9
GIAC Maroons	0

Final
Toledo Turners	1
Zenthoefer Furs	4

== Final ==
May 15, 1949

Elizabeth S.C. (NJ)	6–1	Zenthoefer Furs (MO)
Lacko(3); Hannah; Geiger; Hritz	(Report)	Linck

Eintracht Oval; Astoria, New York
Attendance: 3400
Referee: Dave Goodwin

== See also ==
- 1949 National Challenge Cup
