= San Pedro Yugoslavs =

- Full name: San Pedro Yugoslavs
- Founded: 1950s
- League: GLASL

The San Pedro Yugoslavs was a soccer team based in San Pedro, Los Angeles that played in Greater Los Angeles Soccer League.

== History ==
The club, which represented the community Yugoslav of San Pedro, the district of Los Angeles, had joined the Greater Los Angeles Soccer League.

Active since the 1950s, the club reached the National Challenge Cup on four occasions. The first final reached was in 1971 and was lost against New York Hota Bavarian SC. The following year San Pedro reached the final again, losing it against the Elizabeth SC.

They returned to the National Challenge Cup in 1984, losing it against the New York AO Krete . They played their last final in 1986, losing against the St. Louis Kutis. In 1987 they could have participated in the 1987 CONCACAF Champions' Cup but the club gave up participating and thus lost both qualifying matches against the Mexicans of the America.

== Year-by-year ==
Year	Division	League	Regular season	Playoffs	Open Cup
1971		GLASL			Runner-up
1972		GLASL			Runner-up
1984		GLASL			Runner-up
1986		GLASL			Runner-up

== Honors ==
- National Challenge Cup Runner-up (4): 1971, 1972, 1984, 1986
- Participations in CONCACAF Champions' Cup: 1987
