= 1949 National Challenge Cup =

Football cup championship in the United States

- Dewar Challenge Cup

Tournament details
- Country: United States
- Dates: 23 January – 29 May 1949

Final positions
- Champions: Morgan SC (1st title)
- Runners-up: Philadelphia Nationals
- Semifinalists: New York S.C.; Polish American

The 1949 National Challenge Cup was the largest soccer tournament in the United States in 1949. The four St. Louis Soccer League teams withdrew from the competition citing "a succession of unpleasant experiences connected with the playing of the National Challenge Cup." The St.L league teams were upset about financial losses totaling $2300 from the previous season's tournament. The announcement of the withdrawal came a week and a half after Brookhattan-Galicia stuck Simpkins with a $1550 airline bill following the 1948 championship game hosted by the Simpkins. The remaining St. Louis representatives were the four amateur Municipal League entrants. With the defending champions out of the running Morgan Strasser stepped in as contenders by winning their way to the final four. Despite losing the first legs in both the semifinal and final the Morgans pulled out 4-3 aggregate wins to become 1949 U.S. champions.

== Eastern Division ==
Round of 16
January 23
Brooklyn Hispano	1
Segura	0
Kearny Celtic	2
Newark Germans	3
Philadelphia Nationals	3
Kensington Quoits	0
Elizabeth S.C.	4
Trenton Americans	2
February 13
S.C. Eintracht	4
Brooklyn Hakoah	0
February 13, 20
Brookhattan	2-0
New York SC	2-1
New Bedford	1
Ponta Delgada	2
Lincolns	1-1
Gremio Lusitano	1-2

Quarter-finals
February 13
Brooklyn Hispano	1
Newark Germans	0
March 6
Philadelphia Nationals	3
Elizabeth S.C.	2
S.C. Eintracht	1
New York SC	2
March 13
Ponta Delgada	0
Gremio Lusitano	2

Semi-finals
March 20
Brooklyn Hispano	1
Philadelphia Nationals	2
New York SC	3
Gremio Lusitano	1

Final
April 24
Philadelphia Nationals	5
New York SC	1

== Western Division ==
Round of 16
February 27
Chicago Vikings	6
GIAC Maroons	3
February 27/March 13
Chicago Slovak	2-1
Polish American	2-2
Alpine Sportswear
bye
Plaza Amusement	0
Zenthoefer Furs	4
Rochester Thistles	3
Lakesiders	1
Morgan SC	3
Castle Shannon 2	2
February 13
West Newton Moose	4
Moon Run	3
February 13
Castle Shannon 1	0
Cecil French	2

Quarter-finals
March 27
Chicago Vikings	0
Polish American	2
March 26
Alpine Sportswear	0
Zenthoefer Furs	5
February 20
Rochester Thistles	1
Morgan SC	4
March 6
West Newton Moose	1
Cecil French	3

Semi-finals
April 10 - Chicago
Polish American	5
Zenthoefer Furs	1
Morgan SC	3
Cecil French	0

Final
April 24/May 8
Polish American	3-0
Morgan SC	2-2

== Final ==
May 15, 1949

Philadelphia Nationals (ASL)	1–0	Morgan SC (KL)
Nick Kropfelder

Philadelphia, Pennsylvania
Referee: J. Cahill (USA)
May 29, 1949

Morgan SC (KL)	4–2	Philadelphia Nationals (ASL)
Gustave Teyssier 23', Nicholas DiOrio; Albert Innarelli		John Sullivan 35' (pen.); Nick Kropfelder

Bridgeville Park Pittsburgh, Pennsylvania
Attendance: 1000
Referee: Sam Galin (New York)

== See also ==
- 1949 National Amateur Cup
