= 1970 National Challenge Cup =

- Dewar Challenge Cup

Tournament details
- Country: United States
- Dates: 25 January – 3 May 1970

Final positions
- Champions: Elizabeth S.C. (1st title)
- Runners-up: Los Angeles Croatia
- 1971 CONCACAF Champions' Cup: Elizabeth S.C.

The 1970 National Challenge Cup was the 57th awarding of the United States Soccer Football Association's annual open soccer championship prize. Teams from the North American Soccer League declined to participate. The Elizabeth S.C. defeated the Los Angeles Croatia in the final game.

== Bracket ==
Round of 16
Ukrainians
Taunton	4
Fall River Americans	3
April 5 - Union
Elizabeth	4
Phi German Hungarian	1
March 1
Danube Swaben	4
Buffalo	0
March 1 - St. Louis
St. Philip Neri	1
Kutis	0
March 8 - Chicago
Slovaks	2
Milwaukee Bavarians	1
January 25 - Los Angeles
LA Hungarians	0
LA Croatia	1
March 1 - San Francisco
SF Scots	1
Leif Erikson Vikings	3

Quarterfinals
April 12
Ukrainians	3
Taunton	1
April 12 - Union
Elizabeth	4
Danube Swaben	1
March 15 - St. Louis
St. Philip Neri	0
Slovaks	2
March 8, 14 - LA/Seattle
Croatia	3-3
Leif Erikson Vikings	2-2

Semi-finals
April 19 - Queens
Ukrainians	0
Elizabeth	2
April 12 - Chicago
Slovaks	1
Croatia	2

Final
May 3 - New York
Elizabeth	2
Croatia	1
