= 1971 National Challenge Cup =

- Dewar Challenge Cup

Tournament details
- Country: United States
- Dates: 13 December 1970 – 16 May 1971

Final positions
- Champions: New York Hota Bavarian SC (1st title)
- Runners-up: San Pedro Yugoslavs

The 1971 National Challenge Cup was the 58th awarding of the United States Soccer Football Association's annual open soccer championship prize. Teams from the North American Soccer League declined to participate. The New York Hota defeated the San Pedro Yugoslavs in the final game.

== Bracket ==
Round of 16
February 21 - Seattle
Heidelberg Brewers	4
San Jose Grenadiers	2
January 17 - Los Angeles
University Club	2
San Pedro Yugoslavs	3
April 18 - Milwaukee
Pabst Blue Ribbons	1
Chicago Sparta	5
April 18 - St. Louis
St. Louis Hamm	2
Denver Kickers	0
Taunton
April 11
NY Hota	5
Philadelphia Nationals	0
December 13 - Bay Village
Danube Swaben	1
Rochester Rangers	0
February 28
Ukrainian Nationals	1
Elizabeth S.C.	0

Quarterfinals
March 7, 14 - Seattle/LA
Heidelberg Brewers	1-0
Yugoslavs	0-2
April 25 - Chicago
Sparta	0
Hamm	1
April 18 - Fall River
Taunton	1
Hota	4
April 4 - Cleveland
Danube Swaben	2
Ukrainian Nationals	1

Semi-finals
May 2 - Los Angeles
Yugoslavs	w/o
Hamm
May 2 - Long Island
Hota	3
Danube Swaben	1

Final
May 16 - Los Angeles
Yugoslavs	4
Hota	6
