= Cosmopolitan Soccer League =

Regional soccer league based in and around New York City

- Founded: 1923; 103 years ago
- First season: 1923–24
- Country: United States
- Confederation: CONCACAF (North American Football Union)
- Number of clubs: 112
- Promotion to: American Premier Soccer League
- Relegation to: CSL Division 2
- Domestic cup: U.S. Open Cup
- International cup: CONCACAF Champions League
- Current champions: Polonia SC (1st title) (2024–25)
- Most championships: German-Hungarian SC (11 titles)
- Website: cosmosoccerleague.com

The Cosmopolitan Soccer League is a regional soccer league consisting of semi-pro and amateur teams based in and around New York City. Established in 1923, it is one of the oldest soccer leagues in the United States and has contributed greatly to the nation's soccer history.

Currently, the league has four open divisions. The first two divisions require all clubs to also field reserve teams, a requirement that some leagues have abolished, but which the Cosmopolitan Soccer League believes makes its competition some of the strongest in United States soccer. The league also has an over-30 and an over-40 division. The league is USASA-affiliated.

The Cosmopolitan Soccer League plays a traditional international schedule with competition beginning the second weekend of September and running through June, with a winter break from late December to early March. During the winter months, the league runs optional league cups.

== History ==
The Cosmopolitan Soccer League was formed as the "German American Soccer League" in 1923. In 1927, the association changed its name to the German American Football Association. The league was highly successful in the 1920s and, in New York, was behind only baseball and basketball in terms of popularity. The league struggled through the Great Depression and by the 1940s the game was viewed by most Americans as an "ethnic" sport. Attendance and popularity declined sharply until the founding of the North American Soccer League in 1968. By the mid-1970s, league officials recognized that in order to maintain the league's viability in the same market as the star-studded New York Cosmos, it needed to appeal to a wider audience and in 1977, it voted to change its name to the Cosmopolitan Soccer League. Prior to the professionalizing of the modern American game, the United States national team often consisted of Cosmopolitan League players.

In 1923, five teams, S.C. New York, Wiener Sports Club, D.S.C. Brooklyn, Hoboken FC 1912 and Newark S.C., banded together to found the German American Soccer League. As the name suggests, the teams were largely composed of recent immigrants from Central Europe, primarily Germany. The next year, four more teams, Swiss F.C., Elizabeth S.C., S.C. Eintracht and Germania S.C., joined the league. The league renamed itself the German American Football Association in 1927. While the GASL began as a single division league, it added a junior division in 1933. That year, the league also held its first indoor tournament. In addition to its junior division, the GASL also added several lower divisions over the decades.

In 1943, all of the U.S. leagues suffered from significant player losses from the U.S. participation in World War II. In order to continue to play a competitive schedule, the GASL joined with the Eastern District Soccer League to run a joint season. Following the end of the war in 1945, the GASL found itself turning from a lack of quality players to an overabundance as Central European professionals left their war ravaged countries to move to the United States. The league experienced a second influx of talented players when Hungarians fled their country following the Soviet Union crushing the 1956 Hungarian Revolution.

In 1964, the GASL joined with the professional American Soccer League in a short lived experiment. That year, the two leagues formed the Eastern Professional Soccer Conference which competed during the GASL/ASL off season. The league was a failure and did not complete its one season in existence. While the merger with the ASL was less than successful, the GASL undertook a cooperative agreement with another league, this time the International Soccer League (ISL) in 1965. That season, the GASL All Star team entered the ISL as the New Yorker, going to the final where it lost to Polonia Bytom 5–1. The string of league mergers continued in 1974 when the National Soccer League of New York merged into the GASL.

In 1977, the GASL changed its name in response to a changing American soccer scene. While soccer had existed as an ethnic sport since the 1930s, the creation of the North American Soccer League in 1968 had brought the sport into the mainstream. Recognizing that maintaining its ethnic identity would hinder its acceptance by the wider U.S. sports culture, the GASL governing board voted to rename the league the "Cosmopolitan Soccer League". As part of this process, the league's teams were directed to change their names to ones with less ethnic connotations, although this requirement was dropped three years later.

Despite the regional and semi-professional nature of the league, it featured many of the top U.S. player in the 1950s and 1960s. Even into the early 1970s, GASL players appeared regularly with the U.S. national team. The high regard afforded to the league is reflected in that the National Soccer Hall of Fame considers the GASL as one of a handful of leagues in which a player may become eligible for entry into the Hall of Fame.

The GASL had named an All Star team beginning in 1930. In 1968, after the newly established North American Soccer League approached the GASL about placing a GASL team in the NASL, the league formed its All Star team, known as the New York Cosmos, into an exhibition team. The Cosmos did not enter the NASL until the 1971 season, but when it did, it was well stocked with former GASL players.

== Clubs ==
List of participants in the 2025–26 season: The top former CSL teams play in the Metropolitan Conference in the American Premier Soccer League, which together with the Maryland Major Soccer League, created a regional based multi-league promotion and relegation system between these leagues. Some CSL teams also have reserve teams that play in a separate reserve division.

=== Division 1 ===
- Block FC
- Central Park Rangers II
- FC Sandzak
- FC Ulqini
- Hoboken FC 1912 II
- Laberia FC
- Manhattan Celtic II
- Manhattan Kickers
- NY Ukrainians
- Polonia SC
- Zum Schneider FC 03 II

=== Division 2 ===
- Brooklyn City FC
- Central Park Rangers United
- DeSportiva Sociedad NY
- East River FC
- FC Japan
- Kickoff FC
- NY Finest FC
- NY Galicia
- NY International FC II
- NY Shamrocks
- S.C. Eintracht
- Sporting Astoria South Bronx Utd.
- Stal Mielec NY
- Vibes FC
- Vllaznia NYC
- Williamsburg International
- Yemen United SC

=== Division 3 ===
- Aurora FC
- Braza Futbol
- Brooklyn City FC III
- FanDuel FC
- Junior Mafia FC
- New York Athletic Club II
- New York Legacy FC
- Panatha USA
- Riverside Squires
- SC Football Crew
- Sporting Astoria SBU

=== Division 4 ===
- Al-Asad
- Barstonworth Rovers
- Bolivia Sí Existe FC
- Brooklyn NY SC
- C.A. Islas Malvinas
- Desportiva Sociedad NY Samba
- East River FC Hudson
- Manhattan Celtic Boys
- NY Titans
- NYC AlphaStars
- Ollama FC
- Pelham Parkway FC
- SC Gjoa
- Warriors NYC
- Williamsburgh International III

=== Spring Division ===
- Central Park RangersFC
- Hudson United
- FC Kraja
- FC Rush
- Tiercel City FC

=== Over 40 Division ===
- Barnstonworth Rovers Old Boys
- Central Park Rangers Legends
- Central Park Rangers Legends Old Boys
- Cozmoz FC
- Manhattan Celtic Masters
- Manhattan Kickers Legends
- NY Shamrocks Legends
- Polonez SC
- SC Eintracht Legends
- SC Gjoa Over-40
- Sporting Astoria SBU OG'S

=== Former clubs ===
- Elizabeth S.C.
- Union County SC

== Champions ==
=== List of champions year by year ===
- Title number, in brackets ()

| Ed. | Season | League Champion | League Cup Champions | Indoor Tournament Champions |
|---|---|---|---|---|
| 1 | 1927–28 | DFC Newark (1) | No Tournaments Held | No Tournaments Held |
| 2 | 1928–29 | DFC Newark (2) | No Tournaments Held | No Tournaments Held |
| 3 | 1929–30 | German-Hungarian SC (1) | No Tournaments Held | No Tournaments Held |
| 4 | 1930–31 | 1st SC Vienna (1) | No Tournaments Held | No Tournaments Held |
| 5 | 1931–32 | DFC Newark (3) | No Tournaments Held | No Tournaments Held |
| 6 | 1932–33 | German-Hungarian SC (2) | No Tournaments Held | No Tournaments Held |
| 7 | 1933–34 | German-Hungarian SC (3) | No Tournaments Held | No Tournaments Held |
| 8 | 1934–35 | DSC Brooklyn (1) | No Tournaments Held | No Tournaments Held |
| 9 | 1935–36 | DSC Brooklyn (2) | No Tournaments Held | No Tournaments Held |
| 10 | 1936–37 | DFC Newark (4) | No Tournaments Held | No Tournaments Held |
| 11 | 1937–38 | Elizabeth S.C. (1) | No Tournaments Held | No Tournaments Held |
| 12 | 1938–39 | DSC Brooklyn (3) | No Tournaments Held | No Tournaments Held |
| 13 | 1939–40 | German-Hungarian SC (4) | No Tournaments Held | No Tournaments Held |
| 14 | 1940–41 | German-Hungarian SC (5) | No Tournaments Held | No Tournaments Held |
| 15 | 1941–42 | German-American AC (6) | No Tournaments Held | No Tournaments Held |
| 16 | 1942–43 | S.C. Eintracht (1) | No Tournaments Held | No Tournaments Held |
| 17 | 1943–44 | S.C. Eintracht (2) | No Tournaments Held | No Tournaments Held |
| 18 | 1944–45 | S.C. Eintracht (3) | No Tournaments Held | No Tournaments Held |
| 19 | 1945–46 | S.C. Eintracht (4) | No Tournaments Held | No Tournaments Held |
| 20 | 1946–47 | Elizabeth S.C. (2) | No Tournaments Held | No Tournaments Held |
| 21 | 1947–48 | Elizabeth S.C. (3) | No Tournaments Held | No Tournaments Held |
| 22 | 1948–49 | Elizabeth S.C. (4) | No Tournaments Held | No Tournaments Held |
| 23 | 1949–50 | S.C. Eintracht (5) | No Tournaments Held | No Tournaments Held |
| 24 | 1950–51 | German-Hungarian SC (6) | No Tournaments Held | No Tournaments Held |
| 25 | 1951–52 | German-Hungarian SC (7) | No Tournaments Held | No Tournaments Held |
| 26 | 1952–53 | Elizabeth S.C. (5) | No Tournaments Held | No Tournaments Held |
| 27 | 1953–54 | German-Hungarian SC (8) | No Tournaments Held | No Tournaments Held |
| 28 | 1954–55 | German-Hungarian SC (9) | No Tournaments Held | No Tournaments Held |
| 29 | 1955–56 | German-Hungarian SC (10) | No Tournaments Held | No Tournaments Held |
| 30 | 1956–57 | New York Hungaria (1) | No Tournaments Held | No Tournaments Held |
| 31 | 1957–58 | German-Hungarian SC (11) | No Tournaments Held | No Tournaments Held |
| 32 | 1958–59 | New York Hungaria (2) | No Tournaments Held | No Tournaments Held |
| 33 | 1959–60 | New York Hungaria (3) | No Tournaments Held | No Tournaments Held |
| 34 | 1960–61 | New York Hungaria (4) | No Tournaments Held | No Tournaments Held |
| 35 | 1961–62 | New York Hungaria (5) | No Tournaments Held | New York Hungaria |
| 36 | 1962–63 | Blau-Weiss Gottschee SC () | No Tournaments Held | Blau-Weiss Gottschee |
| 37 | 1963–64 | Greek American AA (1) | No Tournaments Held | New York Greek-American AC |
| 38 | 1964–65 | Blue Star SC () | No Tournaments Held | New York Hota Bavarian SC |
| 39 | 1965–66 | New York Ukrainians () | No Tournaments Held | New York Hota Bavarian SC |
| 40 | 1966–67 | New York Ukrainians () | No Tournaments Held | German-Hungarian SC |
| 41 | 1967–68 | Greek American AA (2) | No Tournaments Held | New York Hota Bavarian SC |
| 42 | 1968–69 | Greek American AA (3) | No Tournaments Held | Giuliana SC |
| 43 | 1969–70 | Greek American AA (4) | No Tournaments Held | German-Hungarian SC |
| 44 | 1970–71 | Elizabeth S.C. (6) & NY Hota Bavarian (1) (Note: Title shared.) | No Tournaments Held | German-Hungarian SC |
| 45 | 1971–72 | Inter-Giuliana SC (1) | No Tournaments Held | Elizabeth S.C. |
| 46 | 1972–73 | Elizabeth S.C. (7) | No Tournaments Held | German-Hungarian SC |
| 47 | 1973–74 | Inter-Giuliana SC (2) | No Tournaments Held | Inter-Giuliana SC |
| 48 | 1974–75 | Hudson Dalmatians () | No Tournaments Held | Inter-Giuliana SC |
| 49 | 1975–76 | Inter-Giuliana SC (3) | No Tournaments Held | Dalmatinac SC |
| 50 | 1976–77 | Brooklyn Italians (1) | No Tournaments Held | Brooklyn Italians |
| 51 | 1977–78 | Brooklyn Italians (2) | No Tournaments Held | Inter-Giuliana SC |
| 52 | 1978–79 | New York Pancyprian-Freedoms (1) | New York Atlas | Turkish SC |
| 53 | 1979–80 | New York Pancyprian-Freedoms (2) | Kearny-Americans | New York Pancyprian-Freedoms |
| 54 | 1980–81 | Brooklyn Italians (3) | Kearny-Americans | Blue Star SC |
| 55 | 1981–1982 | New York Pancyprian-Freedoms (3) | Elizabeth S.C. | New York Atlas |
| 56 | 1982–83 | Vasco Da Gama SC () | Elizabeth S.C. | New York Atlas |
| 57 | 1983–84 | Brooklyn Italians (4) | New York Ukrainians | Brooklyn Italians |
| 58 | 1984–85 | Hoboken FC 1912 (1) | Banatul SC | Brooklyn Italians |
| 59 | 1985–86 | New York Croatia SC (1) | New York Croatia SC | Blau-Weiss Gottschee SC |
| 60 | 1986–87 | New York Hota Bavarian SC (2) | Hoboken FC 1912 | Adriatic SC |
| 61 | 1987–88 | New York Hota Bavarian SC (3) | Shamrock SC | Vllaznimi SC |
| 62 | 1988–89 | New York Croatia SC (2) | New York Hota/Bavarian SC | Madlost SC |
| 63 | 1989–90 | New York Albanians () | Hoboken FC 1912 | Elizabeth S.C. |
| 64 | 1990–91 | Blau-Weiss Gottschee SC () | SC Gjoa | SC Gjoa |
| 65 | 1991–92 | Sportfriends SC () | Clarkstown SC | SC Gjoa |
| 66 | 1992–93 | New York Hungaria (6) | Istria SC | Adriatic SC |
| 67 | 1993–94 | Clarkstown SC () | No Tournament Held | FC Porto |
| 68 | 1994–95 | New York A.C. (1) | Polonia SC | Clarkstown SC |
| 69 | 1995–96 | New York A.C. (2) | St. Barnabas | New York A.C. |
| 70 | 1996–97 | New York A.C. (3) | SC Gjoa | New York Greek-American Atlas |
| 71 | 1997–98 | New York Croatia SC (3) | No Tournament Held | New York Greek-American Atlas |
| 72 | 1998–99 | New York A.C. (4) | New York Shamrock SC | Istria SC |
| 73 | 1999–00 | New York A.C. (5) | New York Shamrock SC | New York Hungaria |
| 74 | 2000–01 | New York A.C. (6) | New York Pancyprian-Freedoms | New York Albanians |
| 75 | 2001–02 | New York Albanians () | New York Albanians | Koha SC |
| 76 | 2002–03 | New York Pancyprian-Freedoms (4) | No Tournaments Held | ZPA SC |
| 77 | 2003–04 | New York Pancyprian-Freedoms (5) | No Tournaments Held | New York Bozniyak |
| 78 | 2004–05 | Greek American AA (5) | No Tournaments Held | New York Greek-American Atlas |
| 79 | 2005–06 | Brooklyn Italians (5) | No Tournaments Held | No Tournaments Held |
| 80 | 2006–07 | Brooklyn Italians (6) | No Tournaments Held | No Tournaments Held |
| 81 | 2007–08 | Greek American AA (6) | No Tournaments Held | Stal Mielec New York |
| 82 | 2008–09 | Greek American AA (7) | No Tournaments Held | New York Croatia |
| 83 | 2009–10 | New York Pancyprian-Freedoms (6) | No Tournaments Held | New York Croatia |
| 84 | 2010–11 | New York Pancyprian-Freedoms (7) | Polonia SC | New York A.C. |
| 85 | 2011–12 | Greek American AA (8) | Central Park Rangers FC | Manhattan Celtic |
| 86 | 2012–13 | New York A.C. (7) | Central Park Rangers FC | Vistula Garfield |
| 87 | 2013–14 | Lansdowne Bhoys (1) | CD Iberia | No Tournament Held |
| 88 | 2014–15 | Lansdowne Bhoys (2) | CD Iberia | New York Croatia |
| 89 | 2015–16 | Lansdowne Bhoys (3) | Zum Schneider FC 03 | Sporting Astoria SC |
| 90 | 2016–17 | Greek American AA (9) | New York A.C. | Cedar Stars Academy |
| 91 | 2017–18 | Lansdowne Bhoys (4) | New York Shamrock SC | Cedar Stars Academy |
| 92 | 2018–19 | New York Pancyprian-Freedoms (8) | Zum Schneider FC 03 | Doxa SC |
| – | 2019–20 | Season and tournaments not completed due to COVID-19 pandemic | | |
| 93 | 2020–21 | Shamrock SC () | Borgetto FC | No Tournaments Held |
| 94 | 2021–22 | Hoboken FC 1912 (2) | Borgetto FC | No Tournaments Held |
| 95 | 2022–23 | Central Park Rangers FC Reds () | Richmond County FC | No Tournaments Held |
| 96 | 2023–24 | Richmond County FC () | NY International F.C. | No Tournaments Held |
| 97 | 2024-25 | Polonia SC (1) | NY International F.C. | No Tournaments Held |

=== Titles by club ===
| Club | Titles | Winning years |
|---|---|---|
| German-Hungarian SC | 11 | 1929–1930, 1932–1933, 1933–1934, 1939–1940, 1940–1941, 1950–1951, 1951–1952, 1953–1954, 1954–1955, 1955–1956, 1957–1958 |
| Greek American AA | 9 | 1963–1964, 1967–1968, 1968–1969, 1969–1970, 2004–2005, 2007–2008, 2008–2009, 2011–2012, 2016–2017 |
| New York Pancyprian-Freedoms | 8 | 1978–1979, 1979–1980, 1981–1982, 2002–2003, 2003–2004, 2009–2010, 2010–2011, 2018–2019 |
| Elizabeth S.C. | 7 | 1937–1938, 1946–1947, 1947–1948, 1948–1949, 1952–1953, 1970–1971*, 1972–1973 |
| New York A.C. | 7 | 1994–1995, 1995–1996, 1996–1997, 1998–1999, 1999–2000, 2000–2001, 2012–2013 |
| Brooklyn Italians | 6 | 1976–1977, 1977–1978, 1980–1981, 1983–1984, 2005–2006, 2006–2007 |
| New York Hungaria | 6 | 1956–1957, 1958–1959, 1959–1960, 1960–1961, 1961–1962, 1992–1993 |
| SC Eintracht | 5 | 1942–1943, 1943–1944, 1944–1945, 1945–1946, 1949–1950 |
| DFC Newark | 4 | 1927–1928, 1928–1929, 1931–1932, 1936–1937 |
| Lansdowne Yonkers FC | 4 | 2013–2014, 2014–2015, 2015–2016, 2017–2018 |
| DSC Brooklyn | 3 | 1934–1935, 1935–1936, 1938–1939 |
| Inter-Giuliana SC | 3 | 1971–1972, 1973–1974, 1975–1976 |
| New York Croatia SC | 3 | 1985–1986, 1988–1989, 1997–1998 |
| New York Hota Bavarian SC | 3 | 1970–1971*, 1986–1987, 1987–1988 |
| Blau-Weiss Gottschee SC | 2 | 1962–1963, 1990–1991 |
| New York Albanians | 2 | 1989–1990, 2001–2002 |
| Hoboken FC 1912 | 2 | 1984–1985, 2021-2022 |
| New York Ukrainians | 2 | 1965–1966, 1966–1967 |
| SC Vienna | 1 | 1930–1931 |
| Blue Star SC | 1 | 1964–1965 |
| Clarkstown SC | 1 | 1993–1994 |
| German-American AC | 1 | 1941–1942 |
| Hudson Dalmatians | 1 | 1974–1975 |
| Sportfriends SC | 1 | 1991–1992 |
| Vasco Da Gama SC | 1 | 1982–1983 |
| Shamrock SC | 1 | 2020-2021 |
| Central Park Rangers FC Reds | 1 | 2022-2023 |
| Richmond County FC | 1 | 2023-2024 |
| Polonia SC | 1 | 2024-2025 |

- Both Elizabeth S.C. and New York Hota/Bavarian SC hold the title of champion for the 1970–1971 season

== CSL in national competitions ==
=== National Challenge Cup ===
- 1951 German-Hungarian SC
- 1955 S.C. Eintracht
- 1962 NY Hungaria
- 1965 NY Ukrainian SC
- 1967 Greek American AA
- 1968 Greek American AA
- 1969 Greek American AA
- 1970 Elizabeth S.C.
- 1971 NY Hota
- 1972 Elizabeth S.C.
- 1974 Greek American AA

=== National Amateur Cup ===
- 1929 DFC Newark (runner up)
- 1936 DSC Brooklyn
- 1944 S.C. Eintracht
- 1949 Elizabeth S.C.
- 1951 German-Hungarian SC
- 2014 New York Greek Americans
- 2017 Lansdowne Bhoys FC

=== McGuire Cup (U-19 National Cup) ===
- 1936 Hatikvoh FC
- 1937 Hatikvoh FC
- 1952 Killsman SC
- 1953 Newark SC
- 1955 Blau-Weiss Gottschee SC
- 1959 NY Ukrainian SC

== See also ==
- Soccer in New York City
- Eastern New York State Soccer Association
