= Laureus Sport for Good Award =

International sports award

- Awarded for: "tremendous contribution to sport or to society through sport"
- Location: Madrid (2026)
- Presented by: Laureus Sport for Good Foundation
- First award: 2000
- Currently held by: Fútbol Más (2026)
- Website: Official website

The Laureus Sport for Good Award is an award honouring the achievements of those who have demonstrated "tremendous contribution to sport or to society through sport". It was first awarded in 2000 as one of the inaugural awards presented during the Laureus World Sports Awards. The awards are presented by the Laureus Sport for Good Foundation, a global organisation involved in more than 150 charity projects supporting 500,000 young people. The first ceremony was held on 25 May 2000 in Monte Carlo, at which Nelson Mandela gave the keynote speech. The recipient is presented with a Laureus statuette, created by Cartier, at an annual awards ceremony held in various locations around the world. Although the Laureus Awards ceremony is held annually, the Sport for Good Award is not necessarily presented every time; it is one of a number of discretionary awards that can be given by the Laureus World Sports Academy.

The inaugural winner of the Laureus Sport for Good Award in 2000 was American Eunice Kennedy Shriver. The summer camp which she started in her back yard in 1962 became the Special Olympics and she was described by CNN's Emanuella Grinberg as "an advocate for the disenfranchised and a trailblazer for the rights of the disabled". The 2004 award was shared: Kenyan cricket organisation Mathare Youth Sports Association received it along with both the India and Pakistan national cricket teams. As of 2020, one individual has been honoured posthumously. Peter Blake, the New Zealand yachtsman, was shot dead by pirates on the Amazon River in December 2001. Since its establishment, the award has not been awarded twice, in 2009 and 2013. It has been presented to organisations or individuals from Kenya and the United States on the most occasions, with three awards for each nation. The 2020 recipient of the Laureus Sport for Good Award was South Bronx United, "a project which used football to change the lives of young people and poor communities in New York."

== Recipients ==
Key
†	Indicates posthumous award

Laureus Sport for Good Award recipients
Year	Image	Winner	Nationality	Notes	Ref(s)
2000	Eunice Kennedy Shriver	Eunice Kennedy Shriver	USA	Founder of Camp Shriver which became the Special Olympics	
2001	Kip Keino in 2014	Kip Keino	KEN	Former athlete, and two-time Olympic gold medallist who has conducted humanitarian work in Eldoret, Kenya	
2002	Peter Blake in 2000	Peter Blake †	NZL	Yachtsman who was killed on the Amazon River by pirates	
2003	Arnold Schwarzenegger in 1974	Arnold Schwarzenegger	AUT	Former bodybuilder closely involved with the Special Olympics – his former mother-in-law was founder Eunice Kennedy Shriver	
2004	Pakistan and India flags	India and Pakistan men's cricket teams	PAK; IND	After being on the brink of war, India and Pakistan relations improved through the game of cricket.	
2004	–	Mathare Youth Sports Association (MYSA)	KEN	Using cricket, the MYSA helps combat the widespread disease and drug abuse in Mathare area of Kenya.	
2005	–	Gerry Storey	GBR	Boxing trainer who spent his lifetime's work running the Holy Family Gym throughout The Troubles	
2006	–	Jürgen Griesbeck	GER	Founder of the "streetfootballworld" project which assists underprivileged children around the world	
2007	–	Luke Dowdney	GBR	Creator of "Fight for Peace" project in Rio de Janeiro	
2008	–	Brendan Tuohey and Sean Tuohey	USA	Co-founders of Peace Players International project	
2009	No award				
2010	Dikembe Mutombo in 2012	Dikembe Mutombo	COD	Former NBA player, engaged in charitable work in the Democratic Republic of the Congo	
2011	May El-Khalil in 2010	May El-Khalil	LBN	Former athlete, founder of Beirut Marathon	
2012	Raí in 2009	Raí	BRA	Former Brazilian footballer, campaigner for social justice	
2013	No award				
2014	–	Magic Bus	IND	Mentors and coaches underprivileged children in India	
2015	Skateistan logo	Skateistan	AFG	Cambodian youth organisation which uses skateboarding as a way of engaging children with education	
2016	–	Moving the Goalposts	KEN	Uses football to empower girls in Kilifi, Kenya, while educating them about sex tourism and AIDS/HIV	
2017	–	Waves for Change	RSA	Surfing therapy for children from the townships of South Africa	
2018	–	Active Communities Network	GBR	Uses sport and cultural activity to promote "community cohesion and tackle youth crime" in London	
2019	–	Yuwa	IND	An "organisation which uses football to empower young girls in rural Jharkhand to overcome violence and child marriage"	
2020	–	South Bronx United	USA	A "project which used football to change the lives of young people and poor communities in New York."	
2021	–	Kickformore by Kickfair			
2024	Rafael Nadal	The Rafa Nadal Foundation	ESP	The foundation helps disadvantaged children and teenagers, offering them opportunities through sports.	
2025	–	Kick4Life	LES	The foundation uses football to reach at-risk children and young people in Lesotho, promoting health, education, life-skills development, gender rights and employability.	
2026	–	Fútbol Más	CHL	Programmes to support young people across Latin America, Africa and Europe, fostering resilience, community leadership and social belonging through football.	
