= Williamsburg International F.C. =

WIFC
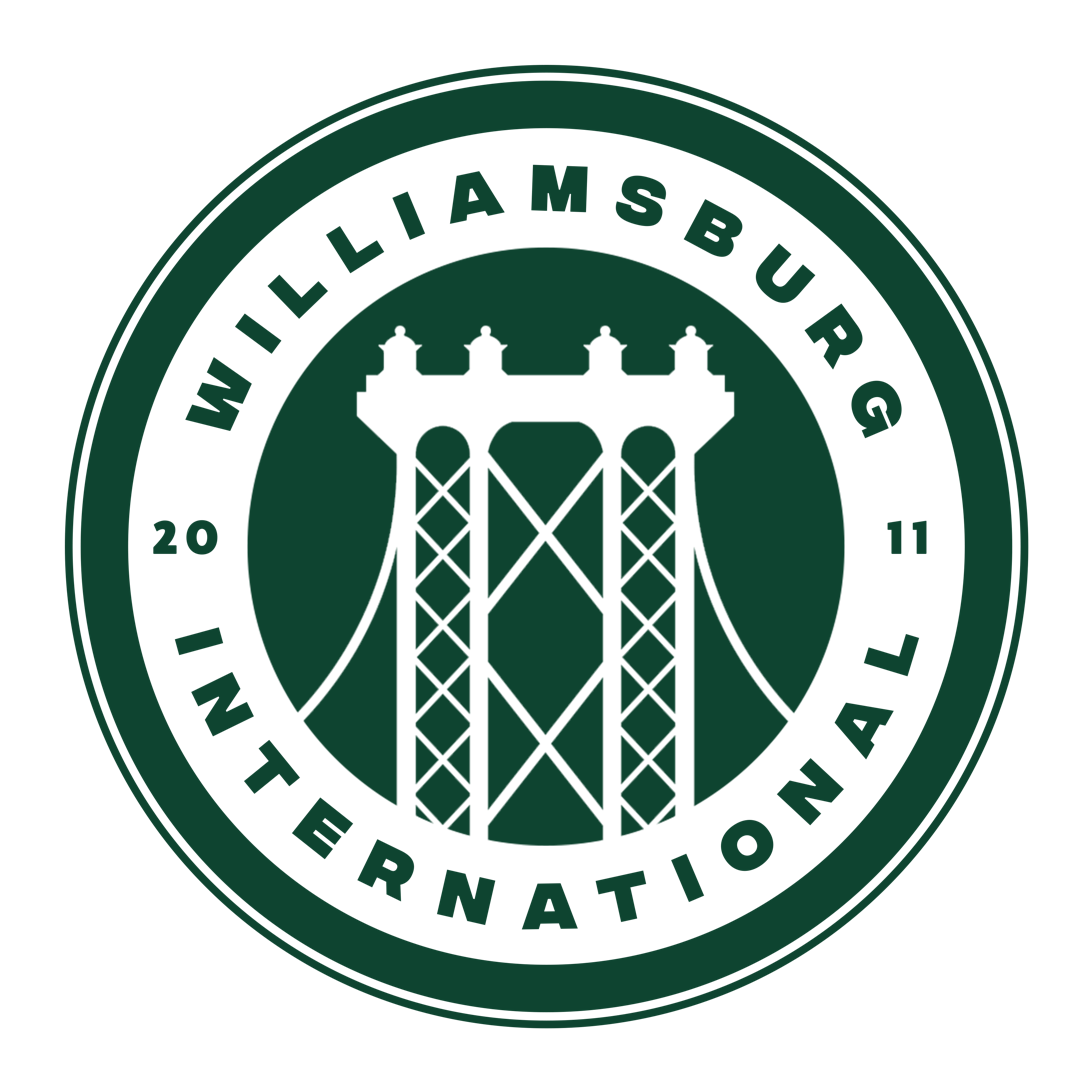
- Full name: Williamsburg International Football Club
- Nicknames: The Doylies; WIFC
- Founded: 2011; 15 years ago as "Doyle's Corner Football Club"
- Ground: McCarren Park, Bushwick Inlet Park
- President: Jason Roos
- Club Managers: Jason Roos (Men), Malya Hirshkowitz (Women)
- League: Cosmopolitan Soccer League
- Website: http://www.wifcny.com/
Home colours	Away colours

Williamsburg International F.C. is an American amateur football club based in Brooklyn, New York. Established in 2011, the club's first and reserve teams play in the second division of the Cosmopolitan Soccer League, an elite amateur league, under the umbrella of the United States Adult Soccer Association.

Press

Beginning in Spring 2024, with a feature on Williamsburg International's season opener, the Game on Wheels sports blog, written by Tyrese Alleyne-Davis began a series of articles covering the club.

Williamsburg International FC Club President Charles von Rosenberg was interviewed by Game in Frame as part of the Spring preview series in January 2022.

Williamsburg International FC Club Manager Jason Roos was interviewed as part of a feature on the club by Protagonist Soccer in February 2021.

The club was mentioned in a September 2020 op-ed in The New York Times on keeping New York's rich amateur soccer legacy alive during the COVID-19 pandemic.

In September 2018, the club was one of six teams featured in Front Row Soccer's coverage of the annual Sal Rapaglia Cup. Williamsburg International earned their spot in the tournament, reserved for the champions of the Eastern New York State Soccer Association's competitions, by winning the 2018 Jack Flamhaft Cup.

In February 2017, Charles von Rosenberg, one of the club's founders, was interviewed by American Pyramid Blog as part of their ongoing feature highlighting soccer at the local level.

In 2016, Josh Roos, WIFC Communications and Marketing Officer, was interviewed as part of ThemeBoy's showcase to discuss his redesign of the club's website.

== History ==
=== Early years (2010–2013) ===
Williamsburg International Football Club was founded in 2011 as "Doyle's Corner Football Club" in New York City. The club played in weeknight men's leagues in Manhattan, Queens, and Brooklyn before joining the Cosmopolitan Soccer League in August 2013.

A frequent early gathering spot for post-match drinks was Astoria's Doyle's Corner Pub, influencing the early naming of the team and referenced to this day through the club's moniker "The Doylies". It was here where the team first learned of the Cosmopolitan Soccer League and began to dream of a full-fledged eleven-a-side club.

During this time the club earned its first trophy by winning the 2013 New York Men's Williamsburg Wednesday Fall Championship. The Doylies would go on to have continued success in weeknight leagues and small-sided tournaments, winning trophies in 2015, 2016, 2017, and 2018.

=== Rise in the Cosmopolitan Soccer League (2013–2020) ===
Under the direction of the club's first head coach, Ben Reichner, the Doylies managed a successful inaugural campaign, including an undefeated spring half of the season.

Bennett Grubbs took the reins in the second season and began building a system and style that would grow into a championship formula. An underwhelming sophomore season, and an 8th-place finish, gave way to optimism as the club entered its third year bursting with talent and possibility.

Capping off a third season in which they lost but a single match, Williamsburg were triumphant in a 3–0 defeat over Metro 2 East Conference Champions Shamrock SC at Randall's Island on June 5, 2016, to win the 2015–16 CSL Metro 2 Division title. Goal scorers in the title match were Mark Gallagher (1) and Andreas Moudatsos (2).

Mark Gallagher took over coaching duties as the club moved up to the CSL's Metro 1 Division. A change in division and a change in coaching had little impact on the Doylie's fortunes as the team soared to a 13–2–3 finish, winning the division title by 4 points over NYFC Iliria. The Doylies clinched the title with an 8–1 romp over Deportivo Sociedade NY at Randall's Island on May 14, 2017, with goals from Mark Gallagher, John Kaddo (2), Nicolas Mikolenko (3), and Charles von Rosenberg (2).

Back-to-back titles earned promotion for Williamsburg to the CSL's second tier, where the club has made its home since 2017.

In 2024, Williamsburg International FC narrowly missed out on the Division 2 Cosmopolitan Soccer League playoffs, falling 0-3 in their final match of the season.

=== Post-COVID Growth (2020–Present) ===
In 2020, the entire New York Soccer community felt the impact of restrictions on social activities due to COVID-19, and Williamsburg International was no exception. Beginning in Spring 2021, teams began again playing competitive matches. Many clubs struggled to survive the impact of the pandemic.

Under the leadership of Club Manager Jason Roos, Williamsburg International FC began a rapid period of growth in the post-COVID era. The club launched a third Men's team in Fall 2021, competing in the Cosmopolitan Soccer League Fourth Division. In Fall 2023, Williamsburg International FC launched a Women's Team competing in the New York Metropolitan Women's Soccer League B Division. In Fall 2025, Williamsburg International FC launched a second Women's Team in the New York Metropolitan Women's Soccer League. Now with two teams competing in the league, the teams were designated as "Green" and "White".

=== Club motto ===
The club's official motto is "Maxime Parva Faciunt Differentiae" (The little things make all the difference).

The club's unofficial slogan is "Serious Fun".

== Club and Team Management ==
=== Executive Committee ===
==== Current members ====
- President - Jason Roos
- Manager, Men - Jason Roos
- Manager, Women - Malya Hirshkowitz
- Treasurer - Gerald van den Berg
- Director, Logistics - Alex Beiner
- Director, Communications & Marketing - Paulina Vairo
- Social Chair, Women - Mara Greene
- Social Chair, Men - David Rodriguez

==== Former members ====
- President (2019–2025) - Charles von Rosenberg
- President (2013–2019) - John Erganian
- Manager (2013–2016) - Benjamin Reichner
- Chief Brand Officer - Richard Butterworth

=== Current Team Management ===
Role	Men 1	Men 2	Men 3	Women 1 (Green)	Women 2 (White)
Head Coach	Nick Hilton	Gus Esgro	Dan Tully	Malya Hirshkowitz	Paulina Vairo
Coach	Austin Font	Alex Mierzejewski	Blaiberg Chicoma	Brooke Tucker	Elizabeth Jedrlinic
Coach	David Rodriguez	James Hartwell	Will Crum	Kyra Conroy	Erin Cullen
Coach	Simon Espinosa	Mike Spencer			Leslie Brown

== Yearly records ==
League champions	Eastern New York State Champions

=== Williamsburg International FC Men's I ===
Season	Head coach	Division	W	D	L	Standing
2025-26	(England) Nick Hilton	CSL Division 2	-	-	-	Ongoing
2024-25	(England) Nick Hilton	CSL Division 2	6	1	9	12th
2023-24	(United States) Eduardo Garcia	CSL Division 2	9	4	5	7th
2022-23	(United States) Eduardo Garcia	CSL Division 2	5	3	8	6th
2021-22	(United States) John Kaddo	CSL Division 2	5	4	11	8th
2020-21*	(United States) John Kaddo	CSL Division 2	4	0	6	7th
2019-20*	(United States) John Kaddo	CSL Division 2	3	1	6	11th
2018-19	(England) Mark Gallagher	CSL Division 2	7	4	5	5th
2017-18	(England) Mark Gallagher	CSL Division 2	8	3	5	4th
2016-17	(England) Mark Gallagher	CSL Division 3	13	2	3	1st
2015-16	(United States) Bennett Grubbs	CSL Division 4	15	2	1	1st
2014-15	(United States) Bennett Grubbs	CSL Division 4	6	2	8	8th
2013-14	(United States) Benjamin Reichner	CSL Division 4	9	2	5	4th

2019-20 and 2020–21 seasons were shortened due to COVID-19.

=== Williamsburg International FC Women's I (Green) ===
Season	Head coach	Division	W	D	L	Standing
2025-26	(United States) Malya Hirshkowitz	NYMWSL B Division	-	-	-	Ongoing
2024-25	(United States) Malya Hirshkowitz	NYMWSL B Division	5	2	5	3rd
2023-24	(United States) Malya Hirshkowitz	NYMWSL B Division	6	4	4	4th

=== Williamsburg International FC Men's II ===
Season	Head coach	Division	W	D	L	Standing
2025-26	(United States) Augustus Esgro	CSL Division 2 Reserve	-	-	-	Ongoing
2024-25	(United States) Augustus Esgro	CSL Division 2 Reserve	6	2	8	9th
2023-24	(United States) Augustus Esgro	CSL Division 2 Reserve	7	3	8	10th
2022-23	(United States) Augustus Esgro	CSL Division 2 Reserve	3	2	11	8th
2021-22	(United States) Augustus Esgro	CSL Division 2 Reserve	6	3	11	8th
2020-21*	(United States) Augustus Esgro	CSL Division 2 Reserve	3	2	5	7th
2019-20*	(United States) Augustus Esgro	CSL Division 2 Reserve	7	1	2	3rd
2018-19	(United States) Augustus Esgro	CSL Division 2 Reserve	10	3	3	3rd
2017-18	(Australia) Christopher Jee	CSL Division 2 Reserve	8	3	5	3rd
2016-17	(England) Richard Butterworth	CSL Metro 2	6	4	8	7th

2019-20 and 2020–21 seasons were shortened due to COVID-19.

=== Williamsburg International FC Women's II (White) ===
Season	Head coach	Division	W	D	L	Standing
2025-26	(United States) Paulina Vairo	NYMWSL B Division	-	-	-	Ongoing

=== Williamsburg International FC Men's III ===
Season	Head coach	Division	W	D	L	Standing
2025-26	(United States) Dan Tully	CSL Division 4	-	-	-	Ongoing
2024-25	(United States) Dan Tully	CSL Division 4	11	3	7	5th
2023-24	(United States) Joseph Cascio	CSL Division 4	8	1	9	9th
2022-23	(Mexico) Adolfo Rodriguez	CSL Division 4	8	1	9	6th
2021-22	(United States) Charles von Rosenberg	CSL Division 4	4	2	12	9th

== Honors ==
=== Eastern New York State Soccer Association ===
- 2017-2018 Division 1 Jack Flamhaft Cup Winners

=== Cosmopolitan Soccer League ===
- 2016-2017 Metro 1 Division Champions
- 2016-2017 Metro 1 Fair Play Award
- 2015-2016 Metro 2 Division Champions
- 2015-2016 Metro 2 Western Conference Champions
- 2014-2015 Metro 2 Fair Play Award
- 2013-2014 Metro 2 Fair Play Award

=== New York Mens Williamsburg Wednesday League ===
- 2013 Fall Division 2 Champions
- 2015 Fall Division 2 Champions
- 2015 Fall Division 1 Champions
- 2016 Fall Division 2 Champions
- 2016 Fall Division 1 Champions
- 2017 Summer Division 2 Champions
- 2017 Fall Division 2 Champions
- 2018 Spring Division 1 Champions
- 2022 Winter Division 2 Champions
- 2023 Summer Division 3 Champions

=== New York Soccer Summer Classic ===
- 2016 Champions
- 2017 Champions

=== New York Soccer Winter Classic ===
- 2016 Champions

== Club records ==
As of as of 2023–24 Season. Players still active for Williamsburg International FC are shown in bold.

=== Men's Records ===
Most appearances
#	Player	Nat.	Apps
1	**Gerald van den Berg**	(Netherlands)	155
2	**Gaurav Hingorani**	(England)	122
3	**Jason Roos**	(United States)	116
4	**Augustus Esgro**	(United States)	110
5	**John Kaddo**	(United States)	102

Top scorers
#	Player	Nat.	Goals
1	Mark Gallagher	(England)	95
2	**John Kaddo**	(United States)	86
3	Andreas Moudatsos	(Greece)	76
4	Daniel Rivas	(Colombia)	32
4	Nicolas Mikolenko	(United States)	32

Goals Against Average
#	Player	Nat.	GAA
1	**Steve Flinchbaugh**	(United States)	2.19
2	John Erganian	(United States)	2.20
3	**Johnny Shaw**	(United States)	2.38

=== Women's Records ===
Most appearances
#	Player	Nat.	Apps
1	Nya Rafali	(Madagascar)	17
2	Malya Hirshkowitz	(United States)	16
3	Paulina Vairo	(United States)	15
3	Brooke Tucker	(United States)	15
5	Erin Cullen	(United States)	13
5	Katya Urbano	(Mexico)	13
5	Madi Chassin	(United States)	13

Top scorers
#	Player	Nat.	Goals
1	**Malya Hirshkowitz**	(United States)	7
2	**Nya Rafali**	(Madagascar)	6
2	**Paulina Vairo**	(United States)	6
4	**Mara Greene**	(United States)	4
5	**Pauline Claramunt**	(Chile)	4

Goals Against Average
#	Player	Nat.	GAA
1	**Annie Virnig**	(United States)	1.00
2	**Mae Easterbrook**	(United States)	2.00
3	**Michaela Hecht**	(United States)	2.53

=== Hall of Fame ===
During Williamsburg International's 10th Anniversary Celebration, the club elected five members as part of an inaugural Hall of Fame cohort. In order to be considered for the Hall of Fame, players must no longer be active players. Hall of Fame nominees are voted on by current and former Williamsburg International players.

_{Note: Flags indicate national team as defined under FIFA eligibility rules; some limited exceptions apply. Players may hold more than one non-FIFA nationality.}

HOF Class	Player	Pos.	Nation
2022	Richard Clements	MF	(Wales) WAL
2022	John Erganian	GK	(United States) USA
2022	Sergio Garcia	MF	(Colombia) COL
2022	Nicholas Mikolenko	MF	(United States) USA
2022	Andreas Moudatsos	ST	(Greece) GRE

=== Lifetime Achievement Award ===
Upon his retirement from club operations in 2025, Charles von Rosenberg was awarded the first ever, WIFC Lifetime Achievement Award, recognizing his immeasureable contributions on and off the field.

== Non-profit ==
In 2017, Williamsburg International FC was incorporated in New York State as a 501(c)(3) non-profit with the purpose of promoting the enjoyment of association football, to promote the enhancement of the football skills and sense of community of all its members through the arrangement of training, matches, and social activities.

=== Berk scholarship ===
Named in honor of Anna Berk, the wife of club founder Benjamin Reichner, the WIFC Berk Scholarship annually recognized a young soccer player who embodied the values and spirit of sportsmanship, camaraderie, and outstanding character. Williamsburg International partnered with local youth club F.C. Select to support young players in the Williamsburg community.

== Rivalries ==
Williamsburg International has enjoyed many rivalries over the years. The most consistent of these rivalries has been with New York Ukrainians, who share the Doylies home field at McCarren Park. The teams met frequently in the Eastern New York State Cup, with New York Ukrainians claiming early victories. In 2018, the Doylies beat the Ukrainians 2–1 in the semi-final match on their way to a trophy.

Since 2017, the teams have played twice a season as part of the Cosmopolitan Soccer League's second division.

Series leader	Series rival	Series record	Series began	Notes	References
Williamsburg International F.C.	New York Ukrainians	8W-4D-10L	2014	McCarren Park Derby	

Williamsburg International F.C enjoyed an engaging rivalry with cross-city club Flushing FC. This rivalry reached its height between 2016 and 2017 when Flushing FC posed a serious challenge to Williamsburg International FC's Metro 2 title run and then continued the rivalry with several thrilling matches against the Doylies reserve squad. Sadly, this rivalry ended in 2022 as Flushing FC dropped out of the Cosmopolitan Soccer League.

Series leader	Series rival	Series record	Series began	Notes	References
Williamsburg International F.C.	Flushing FC	7W-2D-0L	2015	Doylie Warrior Derby	

== Inaugural season ==

Williamsburg International FC Starting Lineup Inaugural CSL Match September 8, 2013

On September 8, 2013, Williamsburg International played its first competitive match in the Cosmopolitan Soccer League's Metro 2 division. The Doylies came from behind to defeat Brishna 5–4 at Bushwick Inlet Park, with Andrew Hilland knocking in the winner in the closing minutes. An up and down Fall campaign was followed by a fantastic stretch of seven straight victories in the Spring. The team finished in fourth place with nine wins, five losses, and two draws in its first season. The team's leading scorer on the season was Andreas Moudatsos, who finished with 11 goals in all competitions. Esteban Garcia led the team appearing in all 18 competitive matches, including both the State and League cup.

At the Cosmopolitan Soccer League's Annual Meeting in August 2014, Williamsburg International F.C. were awarded the Cosmopolitan Soccer League 2013–14 Metro 2 Division Fair Play Award.
