= Paterson F.C. =

Paterson F.C. may refer to one of two American soccer leagues in Paterson, New Jersey:

- Paterson F.C. (ASL) a soccer team in the professional American Soccer League.
- Paterson F.C. (NAFBL) a soccer team in the National Association Football League
