= Soccer in Los Angeles =

Location map of professional top-division soccer clubs in Los Angeles County

Soccer has enjoyed longstanding popularity in Los Angeles. As of 2023, Los Angeles County has three top-level professional teams. The LA Galaxy and Los Angeles FC play in Major League Soccer, and Angel City FC plays in the National Women's Soccer League. The Greater Los Angeles area is also home to one 2nd division professional team, Orange County SC, of the USL Championship, and four 3rd division professional teams, LAFC2 and LA Galaxy II, of MLS Next Pro, and Los Angeles Force and California United Strikers FC of the National Independent Soccer Association. There are also many semi-professional clubs and leagues including the United Premier Soccer League, SoCal Premier League and National Premier Soccer League, among others. In 2019, two more professional teams, Cal FC (Thousand Oaks) and California United Strikers FC (Orange County) joined a new, unsanctioned, professional league called the NPSL Founders Cup They both later left, with Cal FC joining the United Premier Soccer League.

== History ==
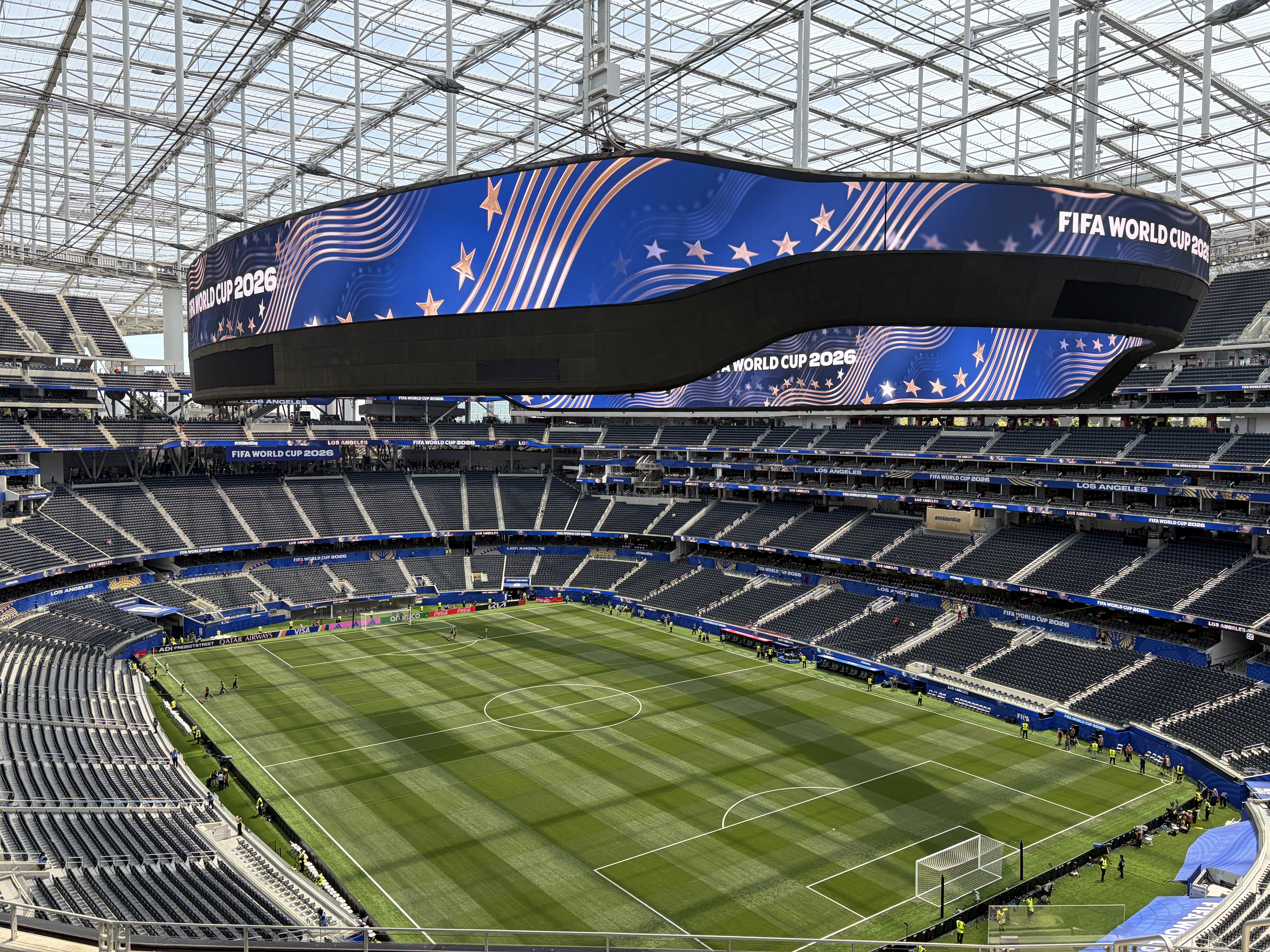
Inside SoFi Stadium prior to the US opening match of the 2026 FIFA World Cup.

Soccer in Los Angeles began in the 20th century when the Southern California Football League was founded in 1902.

=== Historic clubs ===
==== Los Angeles Wolves ====
The first and only champions of the United Soccer Association (1967), predecessor to the North American Soccer League (1968–1984).

==== Los Angeles Kickers ====
The LA Kickers were the first LA area team to win the National Challenge Cup, known today as the U.S. Open Cup.

==== Maccabi Los Angeles ====
LA Maccabi won the U.S. Open Cup, known in their time as the National Challenge Cup, a record number five times.

==== Orange County Soccer Club ====
The Orange County Soccer Club was a two-time consecutive finalist of the National Challenge Cup, in 1966 and '67. OCSC played Bayern Munich at Santa Ana Stadium in 1966.

==== Los Angeles Aztecs ====
The LA Aztecs won the NASL National Championship in their inaugural season, 1974. They played in many stadiums, including the Los Angeles Memorial Coliseum. The Aztecs folded in 1981.

==== California Sunshine ====
The California Sunshine, an Orange County based pro team, played in the ASL.

==== Chivas USA ====
Club Deportivo Chivas USA was a joint venture between Chivas de Guadalajara owner Jorge Vergara, partner Antonio Cué, and Major League Soccer, that operated Chivas trademarks in the United States through the Delaware entity called Chivas de Guadalajara Licensing, LLC. The team folded in 2014.

=== Historic season records ===
==== Los Angeles Wolves (USA and NASL) (1967–1968) ====
Year	League	W	L	T	Pts	Reg. season	Playoffs	Avg. attendance
1967	USA	5	5	2	15	1st, Western Division	Champions	7,777
1968	NASL	11	8	13	139	3rd, Pacific Division	did not qualify	2,441

==== Los Angeles Aztecs (NASL) (1974–81) ====
Several years after the formation of the North American Soccer League in 1968, the Los Angeles Aztecs joined NASL as an expansion team in 1974, and played from 1974 until 1981, folding after the 1981 season. The team featured international superstars such as George Best and Johan Cruyff. The team was at its most popular in 1979 and 1980, averaging over 12,000 fans both seasons.

Season	Division	Position	League Record							Playoffs	Top scorer	
			P	W	L	D	F	A	Pts		Name	Goals
1974	Western	1st	20	11	2	7	41	36	110	Champions	Doug McMillan	10
1975	Western	3rd	20	11	2	7	40	41	36	Conference Quarterfinals	Uri Banhoffer	14
1976	Southern	3rd	44	25	6	14	89	41	15	First round	George Best	15
1977	Southern	2nd	26	14	12	0	37	44	37	Conference Final	George Best	14
1978	Western	4th	30	21	9	0	63	69	36	did not qualify	Jim Rolland	17
1979	Western	2nd	30	18	12	0	54	62	47	Conference Semifinal	Johan Cruyff	13
1980	Western	2nd	32	20	12	0	60	61	52	Conference Final	Luis Fernando	28
1981	Western	2nd	32	20	12	0	60	61	52	First round	Chris Dangerfield	35

==== California Surf (NASL) (1978–1981) ====
Year	League	W	L	Pts	Regular season	Playoffs	Avg. Attend.
1978	NASL	13	17	115	2nd, American Conference, Western Division	Lost 1st Round (San Diego)	11,171
1979	NASL	15	15	140	1st(t), American Conference, Western Division	Lost 1st Round (San Diego)	10,330
1980	NASL	15	17	144	2nd, American Conference, Western Division	Lost 1st Round (Ft. Lauderdale)	7,593
1981	NASL	11	21	117	3rd, Western Division	did not qualify	8,299

==== Chivas USA (MLS) (2005–2014) ====
Season	Conf	Pos	League Record							Playoffs	U.S. Open Cup	CONCACAF Champions League	Top scorer	
			Plyd	Won	Lost	Drew	F	A	Pts				Name	Goals
2005	West	6th	32	4	22	6	31	67	18	Did not qualify	Fourth round	Did not qualify	Héctor Cuadros	4
2006	West	3rd	32	10	9	13	45	42	43	Conference Semifinal	Third round	Did not qualify	Ante Razov	14
2007	West	1st	30	15	7	8	46	28	53	Conference Semifinal	Third round	Did not qualify	Maykel Galindo	12
2008	West	2nd	30	12	11	7	40	41	43	Conference Semifinal	Third round	Preliminary round	Alecko Eskandarian; Ante Razov; Sacha Kljestan	5
2009	West	4th	30	13	11	6	34	31	45	Conference Semifinal	Third round	Did not qualify	Eduardo Lillingston	8
2010	West	8th	30	8	18	4	31	45	28	Did not qualify	Semifinal	Did not qualify	Justin Braun	9
2011	West	8th	34	8	14	12	41	43	36	Did not qualify	Did not qualify	Did not qualify	Justin Braun; Nick LaBrocca	9
2012	West	9th	34	7	18	9	24	58	30	Did not qualify	Semifinal	Did not qualify	Juan Pablo Ángel	4
2013	West	9th	34	6	20	8	30	67	26	Did not qualify	Fourth round	Did not qualify	Erick Torres	7
2014	West	7th	34	9	16	6	29	61	33	Did not qualify	Fourth round	Did not qualify	Erick Torres	15

== Professional clubs, modern era ==
Club	Stadium	Capacity	Founded	Notes
Major League Soccer (2)
LA Galaxy	Dignity Health Sports Park	27,000	1994	Los Angeles' first MLS franchise.
Los Angeles FC	BMO Stadium	22,000	2014	

Club	Stadium	Capacity	Founded	Notes
National Women's Soccer League (1)
Angel City FC	BMO Stadium	22,000	2020	

Club	Stadium	Capacity	Founded	Notes
USL Championship (2)
Ventura County FC	Dignity Health Sports Park	5,000	2015	USL affiliate of LA Galaxy.
Orange County SC	Championship Stadium	5,000	2016	Former USL affiliate of LAFC.

Club	Stadium	Capacity	Founded	Notes
National Independent Soccer Association
California United Strikers FC	Championship Soccer Stadium	5,000	2017	
Los Angeles Force	Rio Hondo Stadium	1,000	2019	

=== LA Galaxy (MLS) (1996–present) ===
The launch of Major League Soccer in 1996 included the newly formed Los Angeles Galaxy as one of the founding teams. LA Soccer Partners were the original owners; Anschutz Entertainment Group is the current owner. The Galaxy won the CONCACAF Champions Cup in 2000.

Season	Conf	Pos	League Record							Playoffs	U.S. Open Cup	CONCACAF Champions League	Top scorer	
			Plyd	Won	Lost	Drew	F	A	Pts				Name	Goals
1996	West	1st	32	19	13	0	59	49	49	Final	Did not enter	Did not qualify	Eduardo Hurtado	21
1997	West	2nd	32	16	16	0	55	44	44	Conference Semifinal	Did not enter	Final	Welton	11
1998	West	1st	32	24	8	0	85	44	68	Conference Semifinal	Did not enter	Did not enter	Cobi Jones	19
1999	West	1st	32	20	12	0	49	29	54	Final	Quarterfinal	Did not qualify	Cobi Jones; Carlos Hermosillo	8
2000	West	2nd	32	14	10	8	47	37	50	Semifinal	Semifinal	Champions	Cobi Jones	7
2001	West	1st	26	14	7	5	52	36	47	Final	Champions	Not Held	Luis Hernández	8
2002	West	1st	28	16	9	3	44	33	51	Champions	Final	Did not qualify	Carlos Ruiz	24
2003	West	4th	30	9	12	9	35	35	36	Conference Semifinal	Semifinal	Quarterfinal	Carlos Ruiz	15
2004	West	2nd	30	11	9	10	42	40	43	Conference Semifinal	Fourth round	Did not qualify	Carlos Ruiz	11
2005	West	4th	32	13	13	6	44	45	45	Champions	Champions	Did not qualify	Landon Donovan	12
2006	West	5th	32	11	15	6	37	37	39	Did not qualify	Final	Quarterfinal	Landon Donovan	12
2007	West	5th	30	9	14	7	38	48	34	Did not qualify	Third round	Did not qualify	Landon Donovan	8
2008	West	6th	30	8	13	9	55	62	33	Did not qualify	Did not qualify	Did not qualify	Landon Donovan	20
2009	West	1st	30	12	6	12	36	31	48	Final	Did not qualify	Did not qualify	Landon Donovan	12
2010	West	1st	30	18	7	5	44	26	59	Conference Final	Quarterfinal	Preliminary round	Edson Buddle	19
2011	West	1st	34	19	5	10	48	28	67	Champions	Quarterfinal	Quarterfinal	Landon Donovan	12
2012	West	4th	34	16	12	6	59	47	54	Champions	Third round	Semifinal	Robbie Keane	16
2013	West	3rd	34	15	11	8	53	38	53	Conference Semifinal	Third round	Quarterfinal	Robbie Keane	16
2014	West	2nd	34	17	7	10	69	37	61	Champions	Fifth round	Did not qualify	Robbie Keane	19
2015	West	5th	34	14	11	9	56	46	51	Knockout round	Quarterfinal	Quarterfinal	Robbie Keane	20
2016	West	3rd	34	12	6	16	54	39	52	Conference Semifinal	Semifinal	Did not qualify	Giovani dos Santos	14
2017	West	11th	34	8	18	8	45	67	32	Did not qualify	Quarterfinal	Did not qualify	Romain Alessandrini	13
2018	West	7th	34	13	12	9	66	64	48	Did not qualify	Round of 16	Did not qualify	Zlatan Ibrahimović	22
2019	West	5th	34	16	15	3	56	55	51	Conference Semifinal	Round of 16	Did not qualify	Zlatan Ibrahimović	30
2020	West	10th	22	6	12	4	27	46	22	Did not qualify	Cancaled	Did not qualify	Cristian Pavón	10
2021	West	8th	34	13	12	9	50	54	48	Did not qualify	Cancaled	Did not qualify	Chicharito	17
2022	West	4th	34	14	12	8	58	51	50	Conference Semifinals	Quarter-final	Did not qualify	Chicharito	17
2023	West	13th	34	8	14	12	51	67	36	Did not qualify	Did not qualify	Did not qualify	Tyler Boyd; Ricard Puig	7

=== Los Angeles FC (MLS) (2018–present) ===
Season	Conf	Pos	League Record							Playoffs	U.S. Open Cup	CONCACAF Champions League	Top scorer	
			Plyd	Won	Lost	Drew	F	A	Pts				Name	Goals
2018	West	3rd	34	16	9	9	68	52	57	Knockout round	Semifinal	Did not qualify	Carlos Vela	14
2019	West	1st	34	21	4	9	85	37	72	Conference Final	Quarterfinal	Did not qualify	Carlos Vela	34
2020	West	7th	22	9	8	5	47	39	32	First Round	Canceled	Runner-up	Diego Rossi	14
2021	West	9th	34	12	13	9	53	51	45	Did Not Qualify	Canceled	N/A	Cristian Arango	14
2022	West	1st	34	21	9	4	66	38	67	Champions	Round of 16	N/A	Cristian Arango	16
2023	West	3rd	34	14	10	10	54	39	52	Runners-up	Round of 16	Runners-up	Denis Bouanga	20

=== Angel City FC (NWSL, 2022–present) ===
Season	Pos	League Record							Playoffs	Challenge Cup	Top scorer	
		Plyd	Won	Lost	Drew	F	A	Pts			Name	Goals
2022	8th	22	8	9	5	23	27	29	Did not qualify	4th, West Division	Savannah McCaskill	6
2023	5th	22	8	7	7	31	30	31	First Round	2nd, West Division	Savannah McCaskill	6

== Los Angeles derbies ==
=== LA Galaxy vs Chivas USA (2008–2014) ===
The rivalry ended in 2014 when Chivas ceased operations.

=== LA Galaxy vs Los Angeles FC (2018–present) ===
Los Angeles FC joined the league in 2018 and a crosstown rivalry, El Tráfico, was created.

== Amateur and Semi-professional ==
=== Amateur and Semi-professional leagues ===
- National Premier Soccer League
- United Premier Soccer League
- USL League Two

=== Amateur and Semi-professional clubs ===
- California United FC II (UPSL)
- Cal FC (UPSL)
- Club Xolos USA U-23 (NPSL)
- FC Golden State Force (NPSL/USL2)
- FC Santa Clarita (UPSL)
- La Máquina FC (UPSL)
- L.A. Wolves FC (UPSL)
- Orange County FC (NPSL/UPSL)
- Oxnard Guerreros FC (NPSL)
- San Nicolás FC (US Premiership)
- Santa Ana Winds FC (UPSL)
- Temecula FC (NPSL)
- Ventura County Fusion (USL2)

== Most successful clubs overall ==
Teams in bold are still active.

Team	D1 Regular season	U.S. Open Cup	D1 Playoffs	CONCACAF Champions League	Total
**LA Galaxy**	**4**	**2**	**6**	**1**	**13**
**Los Angeles FC**	**2**	**1**	**1**	**0**	**4**
Los Angeles Aztecs	1	0	1	0	2
Los Angeles Wolves	0	0	1	0	1
California Surf	0	0	0	0	0
Chivas USA	0	0	0	0	0

== Stadiums ==
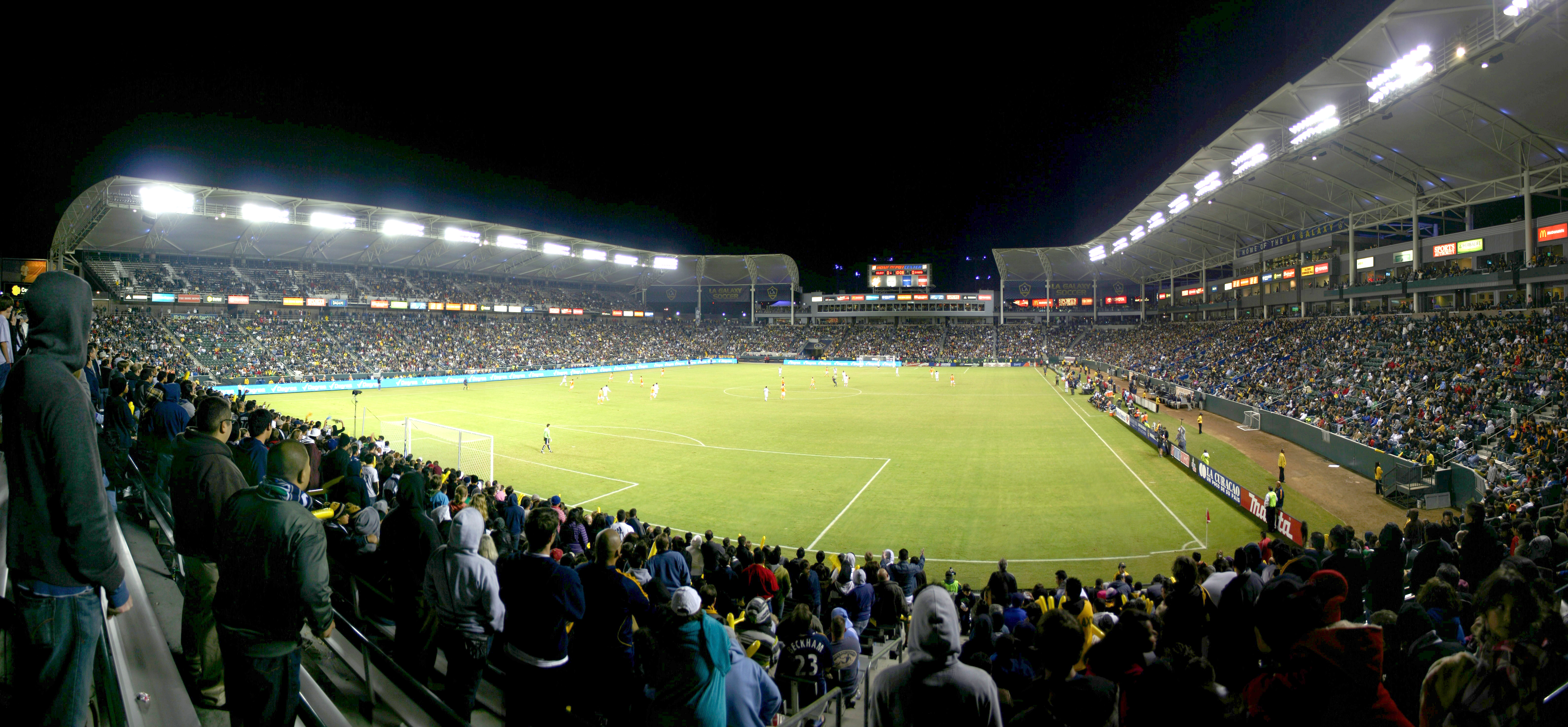
Dignity Health Sports Park during the 2009 MLS Western Conference Final

- Rose Bowl: Hosted the 1994 FIFA World Cup Final
- Dignity Health Sports Park: Second American sports arena designed specifically for soccer in the MLS era. Used historically by the LA Galaxy and Chivas USA.
- BMO Stadium (formerly Banc of California Stadium): Stadium for Los Angeles FC, opened April 29, 2018. Also to be the home ground for Angel City FC once that team starts play in 2022.
- Santa Ana Stadium: A site for historic soccer exhibition games. The historic Orange County Soccer Club played Bayern Munich at this stadium in 1966. Other games included the following:

June 10, 1966	**Bayern Munich (Bundesliga)**	**3–3**	**Orange County Soccer Club (Continental League)**	Santa Ana, CA
				Stadium: Santa Ana Stadium

April 24, 1988	**C.D. Guadalajara** **(Primera División de México)**	**5–4**	**United States** **(United States Soccer Federation)**	Santa Ana, CA
				Stadium: Santa Ana Stadium

August 28, 1988	**Club Sport Herediano** **(Primera División de Costa Rica)**	**1–0**	**Club Deportivo Olimpia** **(Liga Nacional de Honduras)**	Santa Ana, CA
				Stadium: Santa Ana Stadium

January 13, 1989	**Club América (Liga MX)**	**2–1**	**Bayern Munich (Bundesliga)**	Santa Ana, CA
				Stadium: Santa Ana Stadium; Attendance: 11,500

November 16, 2015	**Atlético Marte** **(Salvadoran Primera División)**	**2–4**	**Orange County Blues FC (USL)**	Santa Ana, CA
				Stadium: Santa Ana Stadium; Attendance: 1,684

== Women's soccer ==
In 2009, Los Angeles became home to a third top-level professional team, the Los Angeles Sol, a charter member of Women's Professional Soccer. WPS was the second attempt to establish a fully professional women's league in the U.S., after the demise of the Women's United Soccer Association (which did not have an L.A. representative). The Sol shared The Home Depot Center, now known as Dignity Health Sports Park, with the Galaxy and Chivas USA, before ceasing operations in January 2010.

WPS folded after the 2011 season; its effective successor, the National Women's Soccer League, does not currently have a fully operational franchise in Los Angeles, nor in California. In July 2020, a then-unnamed team backed by an almost all-female ownership group was announced as a new NWSL member. The team, later unveiled as Angel City FC, plans to start play in 2022 at Banc of California Stadium, home to Los Angeles FC of MLS.

== Indoor soccer ==
Although the area does not have any current professional indoor soccer teams, Los Angeles has hosted three. The Los Angeles Aztecs played one tournament and two seasons in the NASL Indoor leagues in 1975 and from 1979 to 1981. The Los Angeles Lazers played in the original Major Indoor Soccer League from 1982 to 1989. Finally, the Los Angeles United played a single season in the Continental Indoor Soccer League in 1994 before being relocated to Anaheim.

== See also ==
- Soccer in the United States
- Soccer in Houston
- Soccer in New York City
- History of professional soccer in Seattle
