= Los Angeles Croatia =

SC Los Angeles Croatia
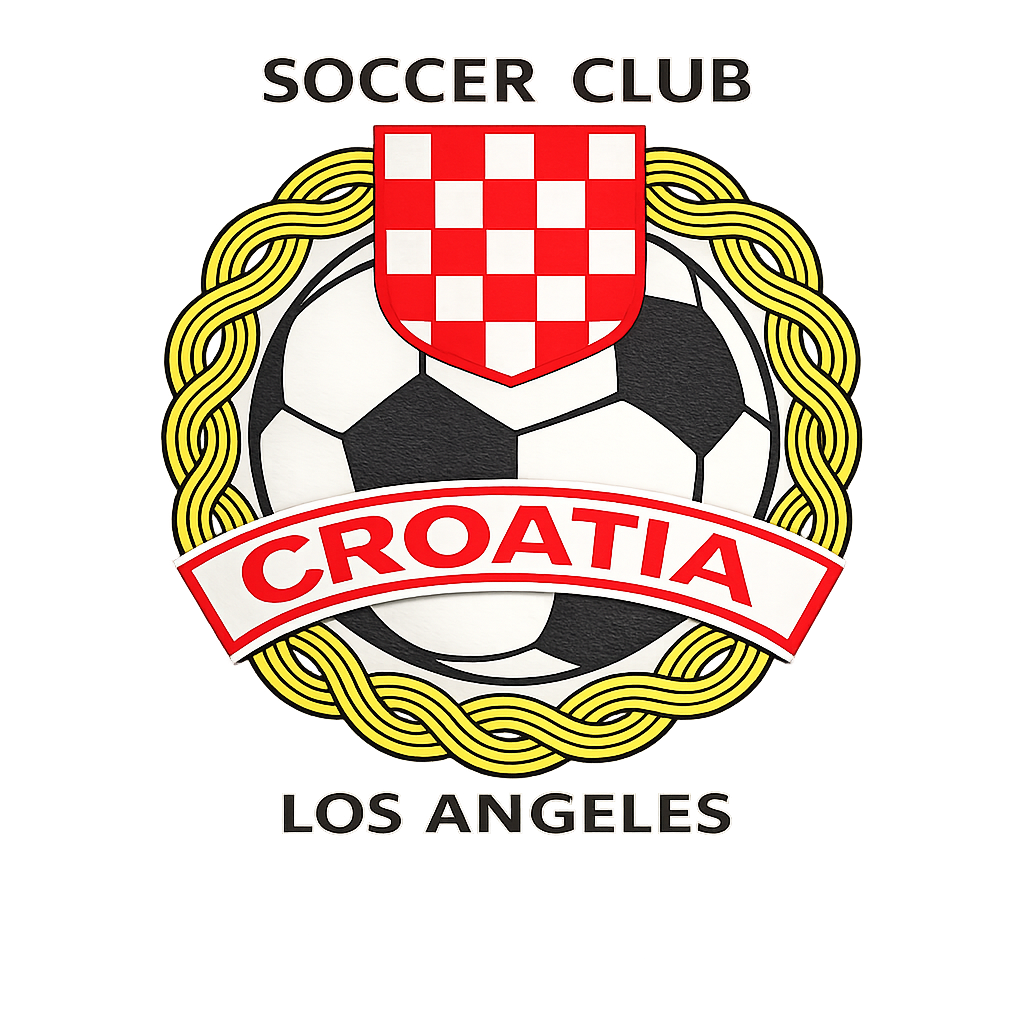
- SC Croatia Los Angeles logo
- Full name: Soccer Club Los Angeles Croatia
- Short name: LA Croatia
- Founded: 1959

SC Los Angeles Croatia was a soccer team based in Los Angeles.

== History ==
The club originally was established in 1959, under the name “Bosna”. It officially change the name to “Croatia” in 1963. The club was National Challenge Cup's runner-up in 1970.

Winners of the first West Coast Croatian tournament in 1973.

Clubs was restarted in 1997.

== Honors ==
- National Challenge Cup
  - Runner-up (1): 1970
