= 1962 National Challenge Cup =

1962 National
- Dewar Challenge Cup

Tournament details
- Country: United States

Final positions
- Champions: New York Hungaria (1st title)
- Runners-up: San Francisco Scots
- 1963 CONCACAF Champions' Cup: New York Hungaria

The 1962 National Challenge Cup was the 49th edition of the USSFA's annual open soccer championship.

== Final ==
June 17, 1962

New York Hungaria (New York (state))	3–0	(California) San Francisco Scots
Andy Mate; Steve Karsey

Eintracht Oval; Astoria, New York
Attendance: 2,500
Referee: Ray Kraft
