= 1955 National Challenge Cup =

- Dewar Challenge Cup

Tournament details
- Country: United States
- Dates: 19 December 1954 – 24 April 1955

Final positions
- Champions: S.C. Eintracht (1st title)
- Runners-up: Los Angeles Danes
- Semifinalists: St. Louis Simpkins–Ford; Uhrik Truckers

The 1955 National Challenge Cup was the 42nd edition of the United States Soccer Football Association's annual open soccer championship.
