= 2010–11 Cosmopolitan Soccer League =

The 2010–11 Cosmopolitan Soccer League was the 87th season of the league's existence, as well as the sixteenth season of the league representing parts of the fifth through seventh tiers of the American Soccer Pyramid.

The defending champions are the Pancyprian-Freedoms for the First Division East. The defending First Division West champions are the Barnstonworth Rovers.

== Standings ==
=== First Division ===
Pos	Team	Pld	W	L	T	GF	GA	GD	Pts	Qualification or relegation
1	New York Athletic Club	14	11	0	3	46	9	+37	36	Qualification for 2012 East New York State Cup
2	Pancyprian-Freedoms	14	10	0	4	50	11	+39	34	Qualification for 2012 East New York State Cup
3	Greek American AA	14	9	2	3	42	18	+24	30	
4	NYC Albania	14	8	4	2	33	28	+5	26	
5	Clarkstown	14	6	7	1	29	40	−11	19	
6	Barnstonworth Rovers	13	5	7	1	19	26	−7	16	
7	Central Park Rangers	14	4	7	3	21	25	−4	15	
8	New York Croatia	12	4	6	2	23	27	−4	14	
9	Stal Mielec	13	4	9	0	19	36	−17	12	
10	CD Iberia	13	4	9	0	13	44	−31	12	
11	Polonia	14	2	8	4	18	32	−14	10	Relegation to 2011–12 CSL Second Division
12	Landsdowne Bhoys	13	2	10	1	14	31	−17	7	Relegation to 2011–12 CSL Second Division

Updated to match(es) played on 24 April 2011. Source: CSLny.com
Rules for classification: 1) points; 2) goal difference; 3) number of goals scored.

==== First Division Reserves ====
East
Pos	Team	Pld	W	L	T	GF	GA	GD	Pts
1	Pancyprian-Freedoms Reserve (C)	13	8	4	1	30	15	+15	25
2	N.Y. Croatia Reserve	12	5	5	2	21	27	−6	17
3	Greek American Atlas Reserve	13	5	7	1	23	29	−6	16
4	Clarkstown Reserve	14	5	8	1	30	34	−4	16
5	NYC Albania Reserve	15	4	9	2	18	29	−11	14
6	Polonia Reserve	14	4	10	0	23	48	−25	12

(C) Champions

West
Pos	Team	Pld	W	L	T	GF	GA	GD	Pts
1	N.Y. Athletic Club Reserve (C)	14	12	1	1	37	5	+32	37
2	Central Park Rangers FC Reserve	13	9	1	3	38	19	+19	30
3	Barnstonworth Rovers Reserve	13	7	4	2	26	14	+12	23
4	CD Iberia Reserve	13	6	5	2	36	30	+6	20
5	Lansdowne Bhoys Reserve	13	6	5	2	23	18	+5	20
6	Stal Mielec NY Reserve	13	0	12	1	10	47	−37	1

(C) Champions
