= 1984 National Challenge Cup =

- Dewar Challenge Cup

Tournament details
- Country: United States

Final positions
- Champions: New York AO Krete (1st title)
- Runners-up: Chicago Croatian
- 1985 CONCACAF Champions' Cup: Chicago Croatian

The 1984 National Challenge Cup was the 70th edition of the USSF's annual open soccer championship. Teams from the North American Soccer League and the American Soccer League declined to participate.
AO Krete of New York City defeated Chicago Croatian of Chicago in the final game. The score was 4–2.

== Final ==
June 24, 1984 St. Louis Soccer Park – Fenton, Missouri
AO Krete (New York, NY) 4:2 Croatian SC (Chicago, IL)

=== Scoring Summary ===
Krete – Mirko Popovski 36′(PK) 81′, Drasko Cvetkovic 55′ n/a’
Croatian – Josip Malkoc 2′, Marinko Volarovic 44′

=== Lineups ===
Krete – Lukovic, Cvetkovic, Ost, Carr, Nelson, Kyder, Popovski, Pedraza, McKeown, Estavillo, Malenkov

Croatian – Lisica, Novak, Galovic, Mikulski, Volarevic, Zanic, Losansky, Vlainic, Dosen, Malkos, Tyma (Milenko)

=== Referee ===
Klaus Kretschmer
