= National Soccer League of New York =

The National Soccer League of New York (also known as the National League of New York) was an amateur U.S. soccer league which served as a lower division for the de facto first division American Soccer League from the 1920s into the 1950s. The league began to decline in the second half of the twentieth century and was displaced by the German American Soccer League (GASL) as the dominant New York amateur league. In 1974, the NSL merged with the GASL.

== History ==
Much of the early history of the league remains obscure. However, in 1928 an NSL select team played Scottish club Rangers F.C. in Brooklyn. Rangers won that game 8-2. In 1941, another NSL select team toured Haiti during which it played a team featuring future National Soccer Hall of Fame forward Joe Gaetjens. This led to him moving to the U.S. and subsequently scoring the winning goal in the U.S. victory over England in the 1950 FIFA World Cup. In 1974, the NSL merged with the German American Soccer League.

== Champions ==
- 1939 Danish
- 1940 Swedish
- 1941 Healy
- 1942 Bigelow Sanford
- 1943-1945 No competition
- 1947 Bigelow-Sanford
- 1948 Segura F. C
- 1949 Segura FC
- 1950 Paterson F.C.
- 1951 Paterson F.C.
- 1952 Paterson F.C.
- 1953 Ukrainian Americans
- 1954 Gjoa
- 1955 Ukrainian
- 1956 Brooklyn Italians
- 1961 Gjoa
- 1962 Gjoa
- 1964 Brooklyn Celtic
- 1966 Brooklyn Celtic
- 1968 Maccabi
- 1969 Palermo
- 1972 Palermo
