= History of soccer in Houston =

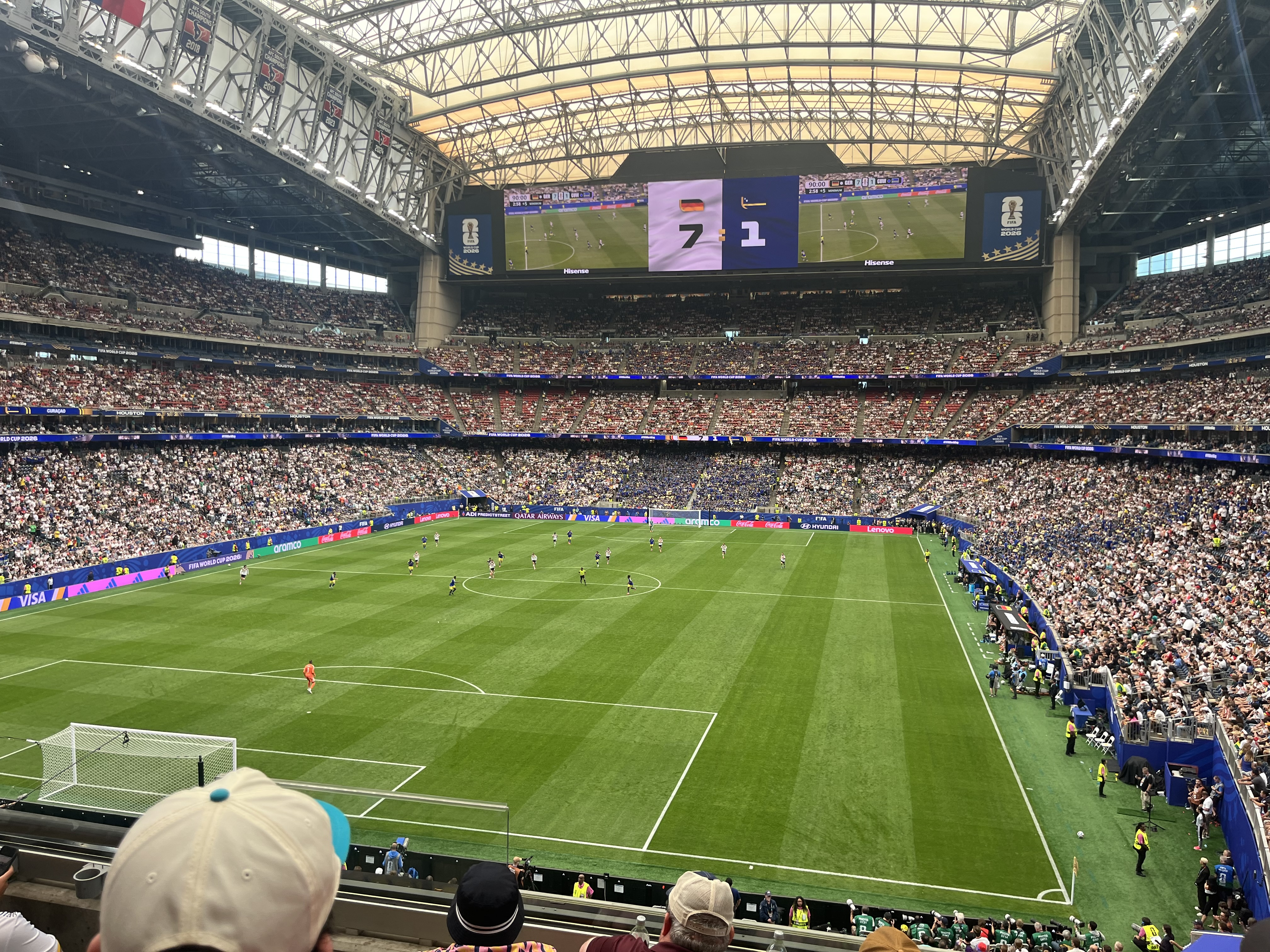
Inside NRG Stadium during the Germany vs. Curaçao match at the 2026 FIFA World Cup.

The history of professional soccer in Houston spans half a century, and includes clubs playing in numerous different leagues such as the North American Soccer League, the United Soccer League, Major League Soccer and the National Women's Soccer League.

== History ==
Professional soccer in Houston began with the Houston Stars, who played at the Astrodome from 1967-68 in the United Soccer Association during their first year and the North American Soccer League during their second and final season. Houston returned to the professional soccer scene with two clubs, both operating from 1978-80: the Houston Hurricane (NASL), and the Houston Summit (Major Indoor Soccer League).

Professional soccer returned to Houston again from 1984–91 with the Dynamos, who competed in the United Soccer League, the Lone Star Soccer Alliance and independently in between. The Hotshots was the last professional soccer franchise in Houston before today's Dynamo, operating from 1994–2000 in the Continental Indoor Soccer League and the World Indoor Soccer League. The short-lived Houston Force of the American Professional Soccer League was terminated during their first season in 1994 due to financial issues.

Houston did not field a professional team from 2000 to 2005 but the city's ability to draw big crowds for friendlies placed it in the conversation to land a Major League Soccer club. Houston had become a hotspot for Mexican First Division club friendlies at Robertson Stadium (the future home of the Dynamo) and the opening of Reliant Stadium, thanks to the return of an NFL team to Houston in 2002, made it a hot destination to host international friendlies.

In the long run, what we want to do is see what the depth of the soccer market is here and what kind of success we can have.

— Houston Texans CDO Steve Patterson, in an interview with the Houston Chronicle, printed May 4, 2003

Houston Texans Chief Development Officer Steve Patterson (whose organization was looking to bring an MLS franchise to Houston) spearheaded efforts to host a U.S. vs. Mexico friendly in May 2003, a rematch of the two nations historic round of 16 encounter at the 2002 FIFA World Cup, as the first soccer match at Reliant Stadium. The 69,582 attendance set a new record for a soccer match in Texas (surpassing the 63,500 for Netherlands vs. Brazil at the Cotton Bowl in a 1994 FIFA World Cup quarterfinal) and became the third largest crowd for a United States men's national team friendly.

=== Bringing an MLS club to the Bayou City ===
MLS Commissioner Don Garber revealed on November 16, 2005 that the league had granted permission to San Jose Earthquakes' owners Anschutz Entertainment Group to relocate the team for the 2006 season, giving the entertainment giant 30 days to make a decision. Garber was in Houston and spoke with the media before an international friendly between Mexico and Bulgaria at Reliant Stadium, citing Houston as a next destination for an MLS club whether the Earthquakes moved or not.

"This is the market they've got their sights set on. This is a market that we've got investor interest, we've got sponsor interest, we've got media interest. This is a market that's going to be terrific for us. We will have a team in Houston in due time. The question is whether we have one as early as 2006 as part of a move, or as an expansion team. We'll get a team here, there's no doubt in our mind."

— MLS Commissioner Don Garber, in an interview with the Associated Press, printed November 16, 2005

On December 15, 2005, Major League Soccer announced the relocation of the San Jose franchise, along with all players and coaches under contract, to Houston. The Earthquakes name, colors and competition records were retained by the league for a possible expansion team. According to MLS, AEG had invested more than $20 million in the Earthquakes since purchasing the team in 2003 and suffered significant losses during that period because of its stadium deal. AEG had previously considered Houston as a site to relocate to and entered "positive discussions" about finding a soccer stadium in Houston.

This is not an expansion franchise. This is one of the best teams in the MLS. You're getting an extraordinary franchise.

— AEG President and CEO Timothy J. Leiweke, at Houston City Hall, December 16, 2005

A ceremony was held outside Houston City Hall on December 16, 2005 to officially announce the franchise's arrival. Mayor Bill White joined city council members, Harris County officials, local soccer organizers and fans in welcoming team coach Dominic Kinnear and players Pat Onstad and Wade Barrett with cowboy boots and hats. It was disclosed that the team would train and play at the University of Houston's Robertson Stadium on a three-year lease with the university earning a percentage of the revenues from concessions, parking and other sources.

In an immediate effort to plant roots in the community, AEG president and CEO Tim Leiweke announced former Houston Oilers quarterback Oliver Luck as the team's president and general manager. A previous NFL Europe executive, Luck had served as the head of the Harris County-Houston Sports Authority since 2001 and was instrumental in pursuing an MLS team for the city while also overseeing the construction of Daikin Park (home of the Astros), Reliant Stadium (home to the Texans) and the Toyota Center (home to the Rockets) during his tenure.

== See also ==
- Soccer in the United States
- Soccer in Los Angeles
- Soccer in New York City
- History of professional soccer in Seattle
