= New York Athletic Club S.C. =

New York AC Soccer
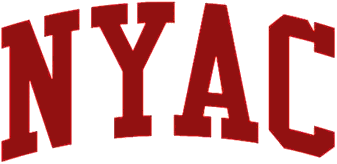
- Full name: New York Athletic Club Soccer
- Nickname: NYAC
- Founded: 2008; 18 years ago
- Stadium: New York Athletic Club; Pelham Manor, New York and New Rochelle, New York
- Capacity: 2,000
- Head Coach: Vasilios Dimopoulos
- League: APSL; Cosmopolitan D3
- Website: nyac.org/soccer
Home colors

New York Athletic Club Soccer is a soccer team based in Westchester County, New York, United States. It is a section of the multi-sport Manhattan-based New York Athletic Club, which also bears the winged foot as its copyrighted logo, and has been noted for achievements in sports that include track, cross-country, boxing, wrestling, rowing, cycling, gymnastics, swimming, and water polo, and was first organized in 1868.

Founded in 2008, the soccer club fields teams in both the National Premier Soccer League and the Cosmopolitan Soccer League (part of the USASA). The two leagues represent the fourth and fifth tiers of the American soccer pyramid, respectively.

The team plays its home games at the New York Athletic Club at Travers Island, where they have played since 2008. The border between New Rochelle and Pelham Manor runs through the field at Travers Island. Most of the field is located in New Rochelle, but the entire parking lot is located in Pelham Manor. The team's colors are red, white, and blue.

The women's team, a sister club of the organization, plays in the Women's Premier Soccer League.

== Year-by-year ==
Year	Division	League	Regular season	Playoffs	Open Cup
2008	4	NPSL	2nd, Mid Atlantic	did not qualify	did not qualify
2009	4	NPSL	5th, Atlantic	did not qualify	did not enter
2010	4	NPSL	5th, Atlantic	did not qualify	did not enter
2011	4	NPSL	4th, Atlantic	did not qualify	did not enter
2012	4	NPSL	3rd, Atlantic	did not qualify	did not enter
2013	4	NPSL	3rd, Atlantic	did not qualify	did not enter
2014	4	NPSL	3rd, North Atlantic	did not qualify	did not enter
2015	4	NPSL	2nd, North Atlantic	Northeast Region Semi-Finals	did not enter
2016	4	NPSL	8th, Atlantic	did not qualify	Withdrew
2017	4	NPSL	6th, Atlantic White	did not qualify	did not enter
2018	4	NPSL	6th, North Atlantic	did not qualify	did not enter
2019	4	NPSL	8th, North Atlantic	did not qualify	did not enter

== Head coaches ==
- (United States) Barclay MacKinnon (2008–2016)
- (United States) Erik Bagwell (2016–2018)
- (Albania) Ridi Dauti (2018–present)

== Stadium ==
- New York Athletic Club; Pelham, New York (2008–present)

== See also ==
- Soccer in New York City
