= New York Hungaria =

American soccer team

- Founded: 1923
- Dissolved: 2000
- Stadium: Eintracht Oval, Astoria (2.500)
- League: Cosmopolitan Soccer League

New York Hungaria was an American soccer team which won the National Challenge Cup in 1962.

== Honors ==
- National Challenge Cup (1): 1962
- Participations in CONCACAF Champions' Cup: 1963
- Cosmopolitan Soccer League Champions (6): 1956–57, 1958–59, 1959–60, 1960–61, 1961–1962, 1992–93
- Cosmopolitan Soccer League Indoor Tournament Champions (2): 1962, 2000

== Managers ==
- Barnabás Tornyi (21 September 1994-6 July 1996)
