= Moon Run, Pennsylvania =

Unincorporated community in Pennsylvania, US

- Unincorporated community
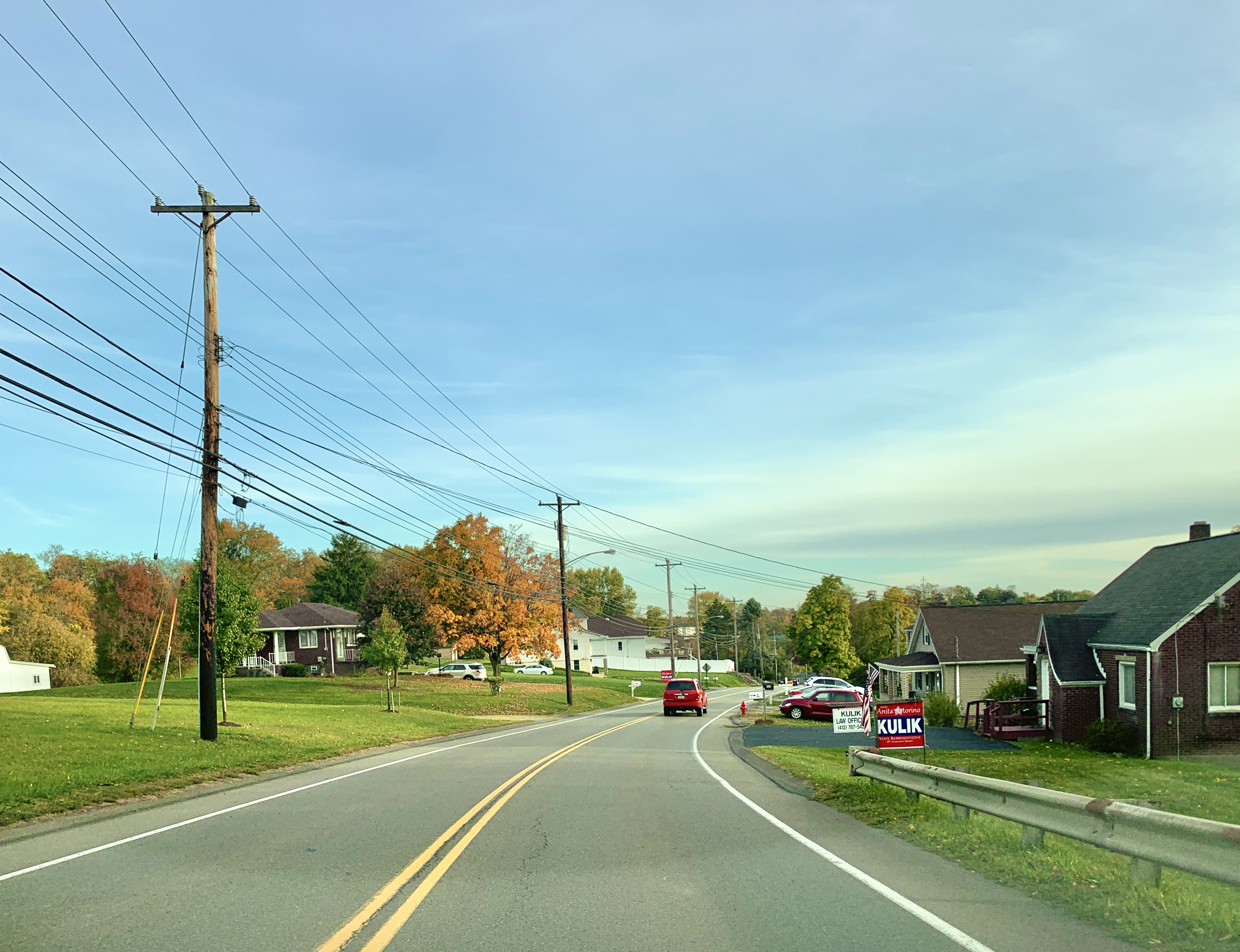

- Location within the state of Pennsylvania Moon; Run (the United States)
- Coordinates: 40°27′11″N 80°6′34″W
- Country: United States
- State: Pennsylvania
- County: Allegheny
- Townships: Kennedy, Robinson
- Elevation: 1,122 ft (342 m)
- Time zone: UTC-5 (Eastern (EST))
  - Summer (DST): UTC-4 (EDT)
- GNIS feature ID: 1181496

Moon Run is an unincorporated community and coal town in Kennedy and Robinson townships, Allegheny County, Pennsylvania, United States.

It runs roughly between Route 60 in Robinson Township, PA, down the length of Moon Run Road, where it merges with Aiken Road. Aiken Road then connects to Clever Road in Kennedy Township, PA.

Preceded by McKees Rocks	Bordering communities of Pittsburgh	Succeeded by Thornburg
