= Shamrock SC =

- Full name: New York Shamrock Soccer Club
- Nickname: Rocks
- Founded: 1960; 66 years ago as "NY Shamrock"
- Ground: Saint Michael's Playground
- President: Teresa Brink
- Head Coach: Paddy Geraghty
- Website: nyshamrocksc.com
Home colours

New York Shamrock Soccer Club is an amateur soccer team based in Queens, New York, United States. The club was founded in 1960 by Irish immigrants in New York and currently plays in Division 1 of the Cosmopolitan Soccer League. In February 2014, the club was formally honored by the Irish Government for their contribution to soccer and promotion of Irish culture in New York City during the inaugural Irish American Soccer Hall of Fame awards.
