= South Bronx United =

New York City-based soccer organization

South Bronx United is a soccer club based in New York City, United States.

== History ==
South Bronx United was founded in 2009.
