= New York Ukrainians =

Ukrainian SC NY
- Full name: Ukrainian Sports Club NY
- Nickname: Ukrainians
- Founded: 1947; 79 years ago
- Ground: McCaren Park, New York City
- Manager: Steve Kovalenko
- League: Cosmopolitan Soccer League Division 2
- 2024–25: ?
- Website: ukrainiansportsclubny.com
Home colours

Ukrainian Sports Club NY, also known as the New York Ukrainians (Ukrainian: УСК (Український Спортовий Клуб) (Нью-Йорк), romanized: USK (Ukrainskyi Sportovyi Klub) (New York)) is an American soccer club based in New York City.

Ukrainians who settled in New York after World War II founded it.

== History ==
The club was founded in 1947. Throughout its history Ukrainians have hosted friendly international matches with teams such as ACF Fiorentina. The club's current coach is Steve Kovalenko. Steve has been managing and coaching the team since the 1960s.

Joe Machnik, member of the National Soccer Hall of Fame, was on the 1965 team that won the National Challenge Cup.

== Honors ==
- German-American Soccer League Champion/New York Soccer League Champion: 2

1965-66, 1966-67

- National Challenge Cup Winner: 1

1965

- National Junior Challenge Cup (James P. McGuire Cup) Winner: 1

1959
