= New York Hota Bavarian SC =

- Full name: New York Hota Bavarian Soccer Club
- Short name: NY Hota SC
- Founded: 1922; 104 years ago
- League: New York Club Soccer League
- 2025: ?
- Website: hotabavariansc.com
Home colors

New York Hota Bavarian SC is a soccer team based in Franklin Square, New York They currently compete in the New York Club Soccer League (NYCSL) and Super Y League.

== History ==
On May 16, 1971, the club defeated San Pedro Yugoslavs in the final to win the 1971 National Challenge Cup.

== Honors ==
National Challenge Cup

- Winner (1): 1971
