= Paterson F.C. (ASL) =

American soccer club

Paterson F.C. (also sometimes known as the Dovers) was an American soccer club based in Paterson, New Jersey was a member of the professional American Soccer League.

The club was previously known as the Trenton Highlanders.

== Year-by-year ==
Year	Division	League	Reg. season	Playoffs	U.S. Open Cup
1939/40	N/A	ASL	10th	No playoffs	?
1940/41	N/A	ASL	11th	No playoffs	?
