= New York AO Krete =

- Full name: New York AO Krete
- Short name: AO Krete

The New York AO Krete was a soccer team based in New York City.

== History ==
On June 24, 1984, the club defeated the Chicago Croatian in the final and was the champion of the 1984 National Challenge Cup.

== Honors ==
- National Challenge Cup
  - Winner (1): 1984
