= S.C. Eintracht =

- Full name: Soccer Club Eintracht
- Nicknames: Eintracht, New York Eintracht
- Short name: SCE
- Founded: 1933; 93 years ago
- Manager: Martin Russo
- League: CSL Over-40 Div.
Home colors

S.C. Eintracht is an amateur American soccer team founded in 1933 which plays in the Over-40 Division of Cosmopolitan Soccer League.

Founded by German immigrants in Astoria, Queens in 1933, and known at times as "New York Eintracht", the team entered the German American Soccer League that same year.

In 1943, it won the first of four straight league titles. Its last league title came in 1950. Eintracht won the 1944 and 1945 National Amateur Cup as well as the 1955 National Challenge Cup. Eintracht also won the Dr. Manning Cup, the Eastern New York State Soccer Association championship, in 1943, 1945, 1946 and 1953. During the 2010–2011 season, they played in the CSL Metro 2 Division.
