= Elizabeth S.C. =

- Full name: German American Sport Club of Elizabeth
- Founded: 1924
- Dissolved: 1999
Home colors	Away colors

Elizabeth SC was an American soccer club based in Union County, New Jersey that played in the Cosmopolitan Soccer League and its antecedents from 1924 through 1999.

== History ==
Elizabeth SC was founded in 1924 as Elizabeth Germans in Elizabeth, New Jersey by a group of German immigrants who shared a passion for the game of soccer. The club immediately joined the German American Soccer League, now the Cosmopolitan Soccer League. In 1940, the Liberty Sport Club merged into Elizabeth SC. In the 1940s, the club started divisions for fencing, track and field, handball and bowling.

In the post-World War II era, Elizabeth SC experienced a tremendous growth in membership, which, in turn, resulted in success in the club's athletic teams. In 1949, the club would capture the U.S. Amateur Cup. Over next few years, the club would start a Ladies Auxiliary and expand its youth movement. Additionally, in 1960 and 1961, the club's handball division would win the U.S. championships.

In 1965, Elizabeth SC purchased its long-time playing field and clubhouse, Farcher's Grove, through a holding corporation. The club played there through 1999, when Farcher's Grove was sold and the club was left without a playing field. After searching for other options, the club suspended its athletic activities.

== Honors ==
- National Challenge Cup winners (2): 1970, 1972
- National Amateur Cup winners (1): 1949
- Cosmopolitan Soccer League Champions (7): 1938, 1947, 1948, 1949, 1953, 1971, 1973
- New Jersey State Cup Winners (5): 1949, 1952, 1955, 1966, 1967
- Participations in CONCACAF Champions' Cup: 1971
