= U.S. Open Cup =

Soccer knockout tournament in the U.S.

Lamar Hunt U.S. Open Cup
- Founded: 1914
- Region: United States (CONCACAF)
- Teams: 80 (2026)
- Qualifier for: CONCACAF Champions Cup
- Current champions: St. Louis City SC (1st title)
- Most championships: Bethlehem Steel; Maccabee Los Angeles (5 titles each)
- Broadcaster: CBS Sports
- Website: ussoccer.com/us-open-cup
- 2026 U.S. Open Cup

The Lamar Hunt U.S. Open Cup, commonly known as the U.S. Open Cup (USOC), is a knockout cup competition in men's soccer in the United States. It is the country's oldest ongoing national soccer competition. The competition was first held during the 1913–1914 season as the National Challenge Cup, with Brooklyn Field Club winning a trophy donated by Thomas Dewar for the promotion of American soccer. For the 1999 edition, it was renamed by the United States Soccer Federation (USSF) in honor of Lamar Hunt, an executive of the North American Soccer League (NASL) and Major League Soccer (MLS).

Maccabee Los Angeles of California and Bethlehem Steel of Pennsylvania both won the cup a record five times, while Greek American AA of New York and Seattle Sounders FC are tied for the record for most consecutive cup victories at three. Since 2008, the champion of the U.S. Open Cup has earned the right to play in the CONCACAF Champions Cup.

The competition is a single-elimination tournament that has been contested by at least 80 teams since the 2014 edition. This pool consists of the American clubs in the professional leagues, which are Major League Soccer, USL Championship, and USL League One. It is also open to amateur teams from USL League Two, National Premier Soccer League, the United States Adult Soccer Association, and US Club Soccer.

Amateur and lower-league teams play in months leading up to the formal tournament rounds, with qualifying winners advancing to face USL clubs in geographical pairings in what most recently has been termed the "second round". Pairings in each round are done by draw within geographic areas, until a final bracket of four teams each in four geographic regions is established. After the fourth round, no new teams are introduced, leading to quarterfinals in June, the semifinal round in August, and a final match to determine the champion in September. Every match, including the final, lasts 90 minutes plus any additional stoppage time. If no clear winner has been determined after 90 minutes of normal time, 30 minutes of extra time is played. If the score is still level after extra time then the winner is decided by a penalty shoot-out.

== Structure ==
In its current format, the U.S. Open Cup is contested by approximately 100 clubs from the professional leagues sanctioned by the USSF, MLS, the USL Championship and League One divisions, and MLS Next Pro – as well as amateur clubs in the earlier rounds of the tournament that qualify through their respective leagues. The overall champion is awarded $600,000 in prize money and a berth in the CONCACAF Champions Cup, while the runner-up receives $250,000, and the furthest-advancing team from each lower-division league receives $50,000.

=== MLS era ===
MLS teams have dominated the competition since the league began play in 1996. No lower division team has won the Open Cup since the Rochester Rhinos in 1999, and the most recent lower division team to reach the final was Sacramento Republic FC in 2022. The most recent champions of the competition, St. Louis City SC, won their first title after defeating Columbus Crew in the 2026 final.

The 2022 U.S. Open Cup marked the return of the competition after the 2020 and 2021 tournaments were canceled due to the COVID-19 pandemic, ending 106 years of consecutive play.

=== Pre-2023 formats ===
Through the 2011 edition, eight teams from each level of the United States soccer league system took part in the competition proper, with each league narrowing its delegation separately in the spring before the competition officially began in the summer. In some cases, additional teams played in qualifying rounds to gain entry. One example was found with MLS clubs, as only the top six from the previous regular season received automatic bids, while the bottom U.S.-based MLS teams faced each other to qualify for the remaining two MLS slots.

Beginning in 2012, the competition was expanded from its previous 40 teams to 64, with the qualifying process radically changed. The National Premier Soccer League received six places, plus the possibility of a seventh in a playoff against a team from the amateur US Club Soccer setup. Nine clubs from the USASA earned places, as did 16 USL Premier Development League teams. Each of these organizations has its own qualifying process to determine its entrants. These 32 teams competed in the first round of the Cup, with the winners meeting all 16 USL Pro and NASL teams in the second round. All 16 U.S.-based MLS teams entered in the third round.

In 2013, the competition was expanded to 68 teams. All U.S.-based Division I, II and III teams participated in the tournament proper: 16 from Major League Soccer, six from the North American Soccer League and 12 from USL Pro. The remaining 34 spots in the tournament field were filled by amateur teams from the Adult Council category–16 from the Premier Development League, eight from U.S. Adult Soccer Association regional qualifying, eight from the National Premier Soccer League, one from US Club Soccer and one from the United States Specialty Sports Association.

The process for determining the site for the Open Cup tournament semifinals and final was changed in 2013. In past years, the sites for the final three matches of the tournament had been determined through a sealed-bid process, but in 2013 the hosts of those games were determined by a coin flip. Home teams throughout the entire tournament were determined by random selection.

Since 2008, the champion of the U.S. Open Cup has earned the right to play in the CONCACAF Champions Cup. The first team to represent the U.S. as Open Cup champion was 2007's winner, New England Revolution.

Starting in 2016, lower-division professional clubs owned by higher-division professional clubs are no longer eligible to participate in the U.S. Open Cup. This removed the MLS reserve clubs in USL from the 2016 competition, after issues of clubs holding back players from their USL sides in 2015 in order to keep them eligible to play for the parent MLS club. Players are only allowed to play for one club in any US Open Cup season. Amateur clubs remain eligible to enter even if they are owned by professional clubs. Initially, "hybrid affiliate" clubs—i.e., lower-division professional clubs that are staffed but not owned by higher-division clubs—also remained eligible, but those clubs were also banned effective with the 2016 competition. This last change was proposed by the Houston Dynamo, which were the senior club to Rio Grande Valley FC Toros in the first such arrangement in the U.S. game; that arrangement ended after the 2021 season, and those two teams would be drawn against each other in 2022.

=== Limited MLS participation (2024–2026) ===
On December 15, 2023, MLS announced that affiliated reserve teams from MLS Next Pro would be sent in place of MLS teams for the 2024 edition. U.S. Soccer subsequently denied the request, ruling that MLS teams must compete in the 2024 edition of the U.S. Open Cup.

For the 2025 US Open Cup, US Soccer announced that 16 MLS teams would appear in the fourth round. For the first time in the modern era, the U.S. Open Cup defending champions will not defend their crown with LAFC participating in the CONCACAF Champions Cup. Likewise, half of the MLS teams would be given priority hosting and half would be designated as away teams when they begin their US Open Cup appearance in the third round.

The selection of MLS teams for the U.S. Open Cup was folded into a wider scheme to ensure that MLS clubs were represented in all the secondary competitions in which the league's teams compete, while none were overloaded with fixture congestion - The CONCACAF Champions Cup, the zonal Leagues Cup, the Canadian Championship and the U.S. Open Cup. As part of that arrangement, the Division III MLS Next Pro teams of most of the absent MLS teams based in the United States took part instead, ensuring their representation.

The 16 MLS first teams represented in the 2025 U.S. Open Cup were chosen based on the following criteria:

- Teams participating in CONCACAF Champions Cup are excluded from the Open Cup, including the reigning champion Los Angeles Football Club.
- Teams not participating in the 2025 Leagues Cup qualify for the Open Cup, ranked based on 2024 Supporters Shield standings
- The next best teams in the Supporters’ Shield Standings that are not in the CONCACAF Champions Cup will enter the Open Cup.
- Expansion team San Diego FC did not enter the 2025 U.S. Open Cup.

=== Full return of MLS teams (from 2027) ===
Beginning in 2027, all MLS first teams will once again participate in the U.S. Open Cup. Following the first round in April, all MLS teams will enter in the round of 64 in July and will have hosting priority for that round.

== History ==
The original Dewar Trophy for the National Challenge Cup, used from 1914 to 1979

The competition dates back to 1913–1914, when it was known as the "National Challenge Cup". The winners of the tournament were awarded the Dewar Cup Trophy, donated by Sir Thomas Dewar for the promotion of soccer in the United States in 1912, until it was retired due to poor condition in 1979. It was brought back into use by the United States Adult Soccer Association in 1997, but is now back on permanent display at the National Soccer Hall of Fame at Toyota Stadium in Frisco, Texas, and the recent winners of the tournament have been awarded a new, different trophy. In addition to this, the name of each winning club is still added to the base of the original Dewar Cup. In 1999, U.S. Soccer honored patron Lamar Hunt by changing the official title of the tournament to the "Lamar Hunt U.S. Open Cup".

The National Challenge Cup was the first truly national cup competition in the United States, as previous cups had been effectively relegated to regional status by the difficulties in coordination and travel caused by the size of the United States in the early 1900s. While U.S. Soccer had initially administered the competition, in 1985 they handed over management to the USASA. In 1995, U.S. Soccer resumed its administration of the competition, marking the beginning of the tournament's modern era.

From the 1960s to the early 1990s, teams from top professional leagues including the NASL did not participate in the Open Cup.

Since MLS' debut in 1996, MLS clubs have won the cup in all but one of those years. The Rochester Rhinos of the 2nd division A-League were surprise winners in 1999, defeating four MLS clubs, including the Colorado Rapids 2–0 in the championship match. The first professional team to win in the modern era were the Richmond Kickers of the USISL (the predecessor to the A-League, later known as the USL First Division, USL Pro, United Soccer League, and now as the USL Championship) in 1995, one year before the start of MLS. D.C. United were the first MLS team to win in 1996.

The tournament was expanded to 64 teams in 2012 with all MLS teams in the United States receiving an automatic berth; previously, MLS participants were determined through a qualifying tournament or were selected based on league standings. A rule change enacted in 2016 removed U.S. Open Cup entries for teams that were majority-owned by another team in a higher tier, which mostly affected USL Championship teams operated by MLS as reserve or developmental squads.

The first round of the 2020 edition was suspended in March 2020 due to the COVID-19 pandemic. The tournament was canceled entirely in August 2020, with all qualified teams automatically qualified for the following year; however, the 2021 Open Cup was canceled as well, due to schedule congestion as an effect of the pandemic. The tournament resumed in 2022 with 71 professional clubs out of a total field of 103, both modern-era records.

On December 15, 2023, Major League Soccer announced that its teams would no longer enter in the U.S. Open Cup starting in the 2024 edition, instead opting to send their MLS Next Pro teams. However, on December 20, 2023, U.S. Soccer announced that they had denied MLS the necessary waiver to allow affiliated MLS Next Pro teams to play in the tournament. A compromise announced on March 1, 2024, allowed eight MLS teams to participate with senior squads and eleven to be represented by MLS Next Pro teams; the teams participating in the 2024 CONCACAF Champions Cup will not send teams to the Open Cup.

For the 2025 US Open Cup, US Soccer announced that 16 MLS teams would appear in the fourth round. For the first time in the modern era, the U.S. Open Cup defending champions will not defend their crown with LAFC participating in the CONCACAF Champions Cup.

== Winners of the U.S. Open Cup ==
=== Champions by number of titles ===
The two most successful teams in the history of the competition remain the historic teams of Bethlehem Steel (not to be confused with the former Philadelphia Union affiliate of the same name) and Maccabee Los Angeles, with five Cup victories each, while three MLS teams have four wins.

| Titles | Teams |
|---|---|
| 5 | Bethlehem Steel, Maccabee Los Angeles |
| 4 | Chicago Fire, Fall River F.C., Greek American AA, Philadelphia Ukrainians, Seattle Sounders FC, Sporting Kansas City |
| 3 | D.C. United, New York Pancyprian-Freedoms, Stix, Baer and Fuller F.C. |
| 2 | Brooklyn Hispano, Brooklyn Italians, Elizabeth S.C., FC Dallas, Greek-American A.C., Harmarville Hurricanes, Houston Dynamo, LA Galaxy, Los Angeles Kickers, New York Americans, St. Louis Kutis, St. Louis Simpkins-Ford, Chicago Sparta |
| 1 | Atlanta United FC, Baltimore, Ben Millers, Brookhattan, Brooklyn Field Club, Brooklyn St. Mary's Celtic, Chicago Viking, Columbus Crew, Eagles, Eintracht, España, Falcons, Fall River Rovers, Gallatin, New York German–Hungarian, Krete, Los Angeles FC, New York Hota, McIlvaine Canvasbacks, C.D. Mexico, Morgan-Strasser, Nashville SC, New Bedford Whalers, New England Revolution, New York Hakoah, New York Hungaria, New York Nationals, New York Ukrainians, Orlando City SC, Paterson F.C., Pawtucket, Ponta Delgada, Richmond Kickers, Robins Dry Dock, Rochester Rhinos, St. Louis Busch Seniors, Uhrik Truckers, San Francisco Italian Athletic Club, San Jose Oaks, St. Louis City SC, St. Louis Scullin Steel, St. Petersburg Kickers, Shawsheen Indians |

=== Champions by state ===
17 states and the District of Columbia have provided winners of the competition, with the largest number coming from the historic teams of the states of New York, Pennsylvania, Illinois and California, reflecting the historic strength of the urban clubs of New York City, Philadelphia, Chicago and Los Angeles respectively. Missouri and Massachusetts have also provided numerous winners, with Boston, St. Louis and Kansas City the centers of the game in those states.

| State | Titles | Runners-up | Champions |
|---|---|---|---|
| (New York (state)) New York | 26 | 13 | Greek American AA (4), New York Pancyprian-Freedoms (3), Brooklyn Hispano (2), Brooklyn Italians (2), New York Americans (2), Brookhattan, Brooklyn Field Club, Brooklyn St. Mary's Celtic, Eintracht, New York German–Hungarian, Krete, New York Hota, New York Hakoah, New York Hungaria, New York Nationals, New York Ukrainians, Robins Dry Dock, Rochester Rhinos |
| California | 16 | 18 | Maccabee Los Angeles (5), Greek-American A.C. (2), LA Galaxy (2), Los Angeles Kickers (2), Los Angeles FC, McIlvaine Canvasbacks, C.D. Mexico, San Francisco I.A.C., San Jose Oaks |
| Pennsylvania | 14 | 13 | Bethlehem Steel (5), Philadelphia Ukrainians (4), Harmarville Hurricanes (2), Gallatin, Morgan-Strasser, Uhrik Truckers |
| Missouri | 12 | 12 | Stix, Baer and Fuller (3), St. Louis Kutis (2), St. Louis Simpkins-Ford (2), Ben Millers, St. Louis Busch Seniors, St. Louis City SC, Kansas City Wizards, (Note: The club, now known as Sporting Kansas City, was based in Kansas City, Missouri, when it won its first U.S. Open Cup title in 2004. The club did not move to its current home of Kansas City, Kansas, until 2007.) St. Louis Scullin Steel |
| Illinois | 9 | 12 | Chicago Fire FC (4), Sparta (2), Chicago Viking, Eagles, Falcons |
| Massachusetts | 9 | 8 | Fall River F.C. (4), Fall River Rovers, New Bedford Whalers, New England Revolution, Ponta Delgada, Shawsheen Indians |
| Texas | 4 | 5 | FC Dallas (2), Houston Dynamo (2) |
| (Washington, D.C.) Washington, D.C. | 4 | 2 | D.C. United (3), España |
| (Washington (state)) Washington | 4 | 1 | Seattle Sounders FC (4) |
| New Jersey | 3 | 3 | Elizabeth S.C. (2), Paterson F.C. |
| Kansas | 3 | 0 | Sporting Kansas City (3) |
| Florida | 2 | 1 | St. Petersburg Kickers, Orlando City SC |
| Ohio | 1 | 6 | Columbus Crew |
| Rhode Island | 1 | 3 | Pawtucket |
| Maryland | 1 | 1 | Baltimore |
| Tennessee | 1 | 0 | Nashville SC |
| Virginia | 1 | 0 | Richmond Kickers |
| (Georgia (U.S. state)) Georgia | 1 | 0 | Atlanta United FC |
| Connecticut | 0 | 2 | |
| Michigan | 0 | 2 | |
| Colorado | 0 | 1 | |
| Minnesota | 0 | 1 | |
| South Carolina | 0 | 1 | |
| Utah | 0 | 1 | |
| Wisconsin | 0 | 1 | |

=== MLS honors ===
| Team | Wins | Runners-up | Years won | Years runner-up |
|---|---|---|---|---|
| Chicago Fire FC | 4 | 2 | 1998, 2000, 2003, 2006 | 2004, 2011 |
| Sporting Kansas City | 4 | 1 | 2004, 2012, 2015, 2017 | 2024 |
| Seattle Sounders FC | 4 | 1 | 2009, 2010, 2011, 2014 | 2012 |
| D.C. United | 3 | 2 | 1996, 2008, 2013 | 1997, 2009 |
| FC Dallas | 2 | 2 | 1997, 2016 | 2005, 2007 |
| LA Galaxy | 2 | 2 | 2001, 2005 | 2002, 2006 |
| Houston Dynamo | 2 | 0 | 2018, 2023 | |
| Columbus Crew | 1 | 3 | 2002 | 1998, 2010, 2026 |
| New England Revolution | 1 | 2 | 2007 | 2001, 2016 |
| Atlanta United FC | 1 | 0 | 2019 | |
| Orlando City SC | 1 | 0 | 2022 | |
| Los Angeles FC | 1 | 0 | 2024 | |
| Nashville SC | 1 | 0 | 2025 | |
| St Louis City SC | 1 | 0 | 2026 | |
| Philadelphia Union | 0 | 3 | | 2014, 2015, 2018 |
| New York Red Bulls | 0 | 2 | | 2003, 2017 |
| Colorado Rapids | 0 | 1 | | 1999 |
| Miami Fusion F.C. | 0 | 1 | | 2000 |
| Real Salt Lake | 0 | 1 | | 2013 |
| Minnesota United FC | 0 | 1 | | 2019 |
| Inter Miami CF | 0 | 1 | | 2023 |
| Austin FC | 0 | 1 | | 2025 |

== Player records ==
=== Career goals ===
The following is a table of the leading career goal scorers in the U.S. Open Cup during the modern professional era (1995–present).

| Rank | Player | Goals | Ref. |
|---|---|---|---|
| 1 | Sébastien Le Toux | 16 | |
| 2 | Kenny Cooper | 13 | |
| 2 | Jaime Moreno | 13 | |
| 2 | David Bulow | 13 | |
| 2 | Johnny Menyongar | 13 | |

=== Season scoring leaders ===
| Season | Player(s) | Team(s) | Goals | Ref. |
|---|---|---|---|---|
| 2010 | Paulo Jr. Nate Jaqua | Miami FC Seattle Sounders FC | 5 | |
| 2011 | David Bulow | Richmond Kickers | 6 | |
| 2012 | Brian Shriver | Carolina Railhawks | 5 | |
| 2013 | Dwayne De Rosario Frédéric Piquionne | D.C. United Portland Timbers | 5 | |
| 2014 | Kenny Cooper | Seattle Sounders FC | 6 | |
| 2015 | Dom Dwyer Krisztián Németh | Sporting Kansas City | 5 | |
| 2016 | David Accam Edwin Borboa | Chicago Fire FC La Máquina | 5 | |
| 2017 | Djiby Fall Stefano Pinho Bradley Wright-Phillips | FC Cincinnati Miami FC New York Red Bulls | 4 | |
| 2018 | Mauro Manotas | Houston Dynamo | 6 | |
| 2019 | Darwin Quintero | Minnesota United | 6 | |
| 2022 | Rodrigo López Lucky Mkosana Facundo Torres | Sacramento Republic FC Tampa Bay Rowdies Orlando City SC | 4 | |
| 2023 | Josh Dolling Damir Kreilach | New Mexico United Real Salt Lake | 4 | |
| 2024 | Dembor Benson Jonathan Jiménez Stefano Pinho | El Farolito SC New York City FC II Birmingham Legion FC | 4 | |
| 2025 | Sam Surridge | Nashville SC | 6 | |
| 2026 | Hugo Picard Tola Showunmi | Columbus Crew Louisville City FC | 4 | |

== Broadcasting ==
ESPN+ had exclusive broadcast rights for the 2019 and 2022 Open Cups. Prior to 2019, the tournament had little broadcast exposure, with the final and select matches being broadcast on ESPN networks and all other matches streamed through the USSF's YouTube channel.

On March 1, 2022, U.S. Soccer and Turner Sports announced an 8-year exclusive multimedia rights deal for the United States men's and women's national teams. Cindy Parlow Cone, president of U.S. Soccer, confirmed in a separate interview that the new deal would include the Open Cup. Early round U.S. Open Cup matches will air on the Bleacher Report app and the Bleacher Report Football YouTube channel.

In 2023, CBS Sports reached an agreement to air the semifinals and final of the Cup. The semifinals aired on the CBS Sports Golazo Network, with the final on CBS Sports Network and Paramount+. In 2024, Apple TV+, via MLS Season Pass, announced an agreement to air the quarterfinals, semifinals and final of the Cup.
