= Chicago Prep Bowl =

American high school football contest

The Chicago Prep Bowl is an annual contest played between American football teams representing the Chicago Catholic League and the Chicago Public League. For most of its history, it was played at Chicago's Soldier Field. The game, for decades, was promoted by the city's mayors. The 1937 edition was seen by a crowd of 120,000 spectators, regarded as the record attendance for a high school football game (and for decades, was unsurpassed in all of American football). For its first several decades, the game routinely attracted crowds numbering in the tens of thousands. Attendance declined significantly by the 1970s. In the decades after the 1970s, antendance frequently has been below 10,000, apart from a brief resurgence in attendance in the 1990s. From the 1960s onwards, the Catholic League teams have won the vast majority of games, with only a dozen games from then onwards having been won by Public League teams.

== History ==
The game was first played in 1927. After a forfeit in 1928, it was not played again until 1933. It was the premier high school football event in Illinois until the IHSA formed the state championship football playoffs in 1974. The 1927 game between Mt. Carmel and Carl Schurz High School drew an estimated 50,000 fans; the largest crowd to see a prep football contest in American history up to that time.

In subsequent years, larger crowds were drawn to the annual game. General admission tickets to the charity game were sold at all of the city's fire stations, and the city's firemen were encouraged to push the sales of tickets to the game (the proceeds of which went entirely to charity), and did so with great success. The 1937 game attracted a high school football record crowd as large as 120,000. It was not until the Battle at Bristol that any match of American football surpassed 120,000 (though a 1927 college football game between USC and Notre Dame at Soldier Field similarly had an unofficial attendance count of 120,000 –and before the Battle at Bristol was often cited as the most-attended American football game of all-time).

The game was not played in either 1929 or 1930. In 1930, a Public League championship at Soldier Field effectively substituted for the inter-league matchup, with 20,000 spectators attending it. The game was made an official annual event in 1934 after receiving the backing of mayor Edward J. Kelly. In the years that immediately followed, the game was initially known as the "Mayor's Charity Game" and the "Kelly Bowl". The game took on the name "Prep Bowl" in 1947, with Kelly leaving office earlier that year having not sought reelection in the 1947 Chicago mayoral election.

Mayor Richard J. Daley was a major supporter of the game. Shortly after his 1976 death, the city ceased sponsoring the event, and attendance began to drop. Within a few years, attendance was under 5,000. Also contributing to the declining interest in the annual game was the predictability of its outcomes. Between 1953 and 1981, the Chicago Catholic League teams won 27 games while the Chicago Public League teams won a mere two games. The advent of the state high school football playoffs further contributed to the decline in interest in the Prep Bowl. In 1979, the Prep Bowl was retooled. Before this, it was a standalone game that pitted the champion of the Chicago Catholic League against the champion of the Chicago Public League. The retooled Prep Bowl game became the final game of an Prep Bowl invitational playoff. In 1979, both the finals and semifinals were held at Soldier Field.

In 1981, the IHSA membership voted to adopt a policy that prohibited member schools from participating in more than nine games (not counting the IHSA state series). The Prep Bowl was given a special exemption from this policy. With the advent of the IHSA state series, the Prep Bowl was contested by the winner of a special playoff in each league played by teams not qualifying for the state playoffs and teams that were eliminated in early rounds of the state playoffs. It is traditionally played on the Friday after Thanksgiving, which is the same day which the IHSA plays its smaller school state championships in football.

In the 1980s, there were discussions about possibly ending the annual game. The city government helped to keep the game at Soldier Field after organizers considered moving it to Gately Stadium. After J. W. Smith became head of the Public League in the 1990s, he worked to revive interest in the game. Smith more intensely marketed the game it, and revived the tradition of hosting pre-game dinner for the participating teams. In 1999, Dick Jauron, coach of the Chicago Bears, promised several of his players would be present at the game. The 1990s also incidentally saw more competitive games and a more equal split in victories between Chicago Catholic League and Chicago Public League teams. This all brought about a brief period of resurgent annual interest in the game.

Before 2015, games were held at Soldier Field (except for the 2002 game, which was held while Soldier Field was under renovation). In 2015 however, with organizers unable to afford Chicago Park District rental fees for the use of Soldier Field, the game ceased being held there.

== Television coverage ==
The game was first televised in 1949, beginning the era of televised Prep Bowl games. Television was regularly blamed with causing as much as a 20,000 decrease in annual attendance at the games compared to the pre-television era. In 1955, a decision was made not to broadcast that year's game on television.

Different broadcasters have carried the game of the year. In 1979, the game was broadcast by Chicago-based NBC station WMAQ-TV. In 2023, the Marquee Sports Network regional cable channel broadcast the game. Among the commentators that have provided play-by-play for broadcasts of the game is the late Tim Weigel.

== Entertainment ==
In its history, some editions of the game have featured entertainment. For instance, in 1937 pre-game entertainment included a performance by Paul Whiteman.

== List of results ==
- Number of CCL victories: 64
- Number of CPL victories: 28
- Number of tied games: 2

Chicago Prep Bowl results
Year	CCL team	CPL team	Score	Winner (CCL or CPL)	Attendance	Notes
1927	Mount Carmel	Schurz	6–0	CCL	50,000	
1928	DePaul Academy	Tilden	12–0	CPL		
1931	Mount Carmel	Harrison	44–6	CPL		
1933	Mount Carmel	Harrison	7–0	CCL		The event was made official for the first time, and was promoted by Chicago Mayor Edward Joseph Kelly
1934	Leo	Lindblom	6–0	CPL	50,000	
1935	Leo	Lindblom	6–0	CPL	75,000	
1936	Fenwick	Austin	19–19	Tie	75,000	
1937	Leo	Austin	26–0	CPL	120,000	The most-attended high school football game of all-time
1938	Mount Carmel	Fenger	13–0	CPL	80,000	
1939	Mount Carmel	Fenger	13–13	Tie	75,000	
1940	Leo	Fenger	13–0	CPL	75,000	
1941	Leo	Tilden	46–13	CCL	95,000	Leo would be named High School Football National Champions this year
1942	Leo	Tilden	27–14	CCL	75,000	
1943	Saint George	Phillips	19–12	CCL	80,000	
1944	Weber	Tilden	13–7	CPL	65,000	
1945	Fenwick	Tilden	20–6	CCL	80,000	
1946	Weber	Fenger	13–7	CPL	85,000	
1947	Leo	Austin	13–12	CPL		
1948	Fenwick	Lindblom	13–7	CPL		
1949	Fenwick	Schurz	20–7	CPL		
1950	Mount Carmel	Lane Tech	45–20	CCL		Mount Carmel was coached by Terry Brennan and led by quarterback Tom Carey
1951	Mount Carmel	Lindblom	19–6	CCL		Mount Carmel was coached by Terry Brennan
1952	Mount Carmel	Austin	27–19	CCL		Mount Carmel was coached by Terry Brennan
1953	Saint George	Austin	38–12	CCL		
1954	Mount Carmel	Fenger	20–13	CPL	46,728–54,000	
1955	Weber	Chicago Vocational	6–0	CPL		
1956	Leo	Calumet	12–0	CCL		Jim Arneberg, who was a star lineman for the 1941 and 1942 Leo teams coached the Leo Lions in this Prep Bowl, becoming the first person to both play and coach in the Prep Bowl
1957	Mendel	Calumet	6–0	CCL	71,157	Mendel scored the game's only points with a Hail Mary pass in the final play
1958	Fenwick	Austin	20–7	CPL	53,000	
1959	Fenwick	Lane Tech	19–0	CPL		
1960	Mount Carmel	Taft	27–8	CCL	71,178	Mount Carmel was coached by Tom Carey (former Prep Bowl quarterback, and the older brother of the team's current quarterback Tony). Carey became one of the first individuals to both play and coach in a Prep Bowl, having won it as a quarterback exactly ten years earlier
1961	Weber	Lane Tech	14–12	CCL	83,750	Weber defeated Lane Tech after a muffed punt snap in the last minute after Lane fumbled the ball far in its own territory with only minutes remaining.
1962	Fenwick	Schurz	40–0	CCL	91,328	This was the third most-attended Prep Bowl to date. The game ended a 10–0 season for Fenwick (in which they outscored their opponents 317–32). In the game, Fenwick's Jim DiLullo ran for 224 yards and scored five touchdowns on just 12 carries.
1963	St. Rita	Chicago Vocational	42–7	CCL	81,270	St.Rita halfback John Byrne scored five touchdowns and six extra points
1964	Weber	Chicago Vocational	34–13	CCL		Critical to the success of Weber's 1964 season and Prep Bowl victory was defensive back Rich "Chico" Kurzawski
1965	Loyola Academy	Chicago Vocational	33–13	CCL	75,400	By the time of the preceding Chicago Catholic League championship game Loyola was down to their third-string quarterback (Ken Krakovich) and a sophomore running back (Jack Spellman) due to injuries of quarterback Tim Foley and all-state running back Randy Marks, but Loyola nonetheless won both the Catholic League championship and Prep Bowl under these circumstances
1966	Loyola Academy	Chicago Vocational	20–14	CCL	61,133	
1967	Mount Carmel	Dunbar	37–0	CCL	58,354	This was the final year of Frank Maloney's tenure as Mount Carmel's coach (he began his collegiate coaching career thereafter)
1968	Mendel	Chicago Vocational	41–19	CCL		
1969	Loyola Academy	Lane Tech	26–0	CCL	67,483	
1970	St. Rita	Lane Tech	12–8	CCL	65,735	Members of the St. Rita team included Billy Marek and Dennis Lick; the team was coached by Pat Cronin
1971	St. Rita	Morgan Park	18–12	CCL		Members of the St. Rita team included Billy Marek and Dennis Lick; the team was coached by Pat Cronin. Despite Morgan Park losing, its coach (Joe Stepanek) won the vote for the "Coach of the Year Award" (an award which had in practice always been received by one of the two coaches whose team had competed in the Prep Bowl game, but for which all coaches in the two leagues were eligible)
1972	St. Laurence	Taft	24–7	CCL	41,371	
1973	St. Laurence	Phillips	40–24	CCL	40,000–55,385	
1974	St. Laurence	Chicago Vocational	34–0	CCL		
1975	Brother Rice	Chicago Vocational	26–0	CCL		
1976	St. Rita	Chicago Vocational	13–6	CPL		First CPL victory since 1959
1977	St. Rita	Lane Tech	20–8	CCL		
1978	St. Laurence	Sullivan	34–8	CCL	23,000	
1979	Joliet Catholic	Julian	30–22	CPL		
1980	Brother Rice	Julian	39–6	CCL		
1981	Mount Carmel	Robeson	14–6	CCL		Mount Carmel were defending IHSA champions, having won the state title in 1980
1982	Gordon Tech	Julian	24–0	CCL		
1983	Mount Carmel	Simeon	28–6	CCL		
1984	De La Salle	Julian	25–20	CCL		
1985	Mount Carmel	Lane Tech	19–14	CCL		
1986	Loyola Academy	Simeon	14–12	CCL		
1987	Gordon Tech	Julian	29–14	CCL		
1988	Loyola Academy	Julian	21–6	CCL	2,500	
1989	Fenwick	Julian	48–14	CPL		First CPL victory since 1979.
1990	Gordon Tech	Robeson	8-7	CPL		
1991	Fenwick	Bogan	27–0	CCL		
1992	Brother Rice	Mather	15–6	CPL		
1993	Mount Carmel	Bogan	34–14	CCL		
1994	Brother Rice	Dunbar	28–22	CCL		
1995	Loyola Academy	Julian	15–14	CCL	1,100	
1996	Loyola Academy	Dunbar	28–8	CCL		
1997	Marian Catholic	Dunbar	28–21	CPL		
1998	Joliet Catholic	Hubbard	28–16	CPL	6,273	
1999	De La Salle	Hubbard	20–13	CPL	35,000	
2000	Marian Catholic	Simeon	23–14	CCL	18,000	
2001	Mount Carmel	Morgan Park	50–0	CCL		Last game before the 2000s renovation of Soldier Field
2002	Carmel (Mundelein)	Dunbar	50–20	CCL		Played at Hanson Stadium
2003	Loyola Academy	Simeon	22–14	CCL		
2004	Brother Rice	Lane Tech	25–14	CCL		
2005	Brother Rice	Morgan Park	13–14	CPL		Overtime win
2006	Brother Rice	Hubbard	24–14	CCL		
2007	St. Rita	Morgan Park	31-7	CCL		
2008	Loyola Academy	Lane Tech	17–0	CCL		
2009	St. Rita	Simeon	34–20	CCL		
2010	Fenwick	Curie	6–0	CCL		
2011	Mount Carmel	Simeon	34–20	CCL		
2012	Brother Rice	Simeon	14–12	CPL		
2013	St. Rita	Simeon	35–20	CCL		
2014	Loyola Academy	Curie	14–7	CCL		
2015	Mount Carmel	Curie	49–15	CCL		Held at Gately Stadium
2016	Mount Carmel	Simeon	42–28	CCL		Held at Gately Stadium
2017	St. Ignatius	Simeon	19–16	CPL		Held at Gately Stadium
2018	St. Rita	Taft	56–6	CCL		Held at Gately Stadium
2019	St. Laurence	Simeon	35–34	CCL		Held at St. Laurence's home stadium
2021	Notre Dame	Kenwood	35–6	CCL		Held at Gately Stadium
2022	Fenwick	Simeon	33–30	CPL		Held at Lane Stadium
2023	St. Rita	Kenwood	21–7	CCL		Held at Lane Stadium
2024	St. Ignatius	Whitney Young	47-8	CCL		Held at St. Ignatius
2025	St. Ignatius	Morgan Park	40-12	CCL		Held at Hanson Stadium

== Game MVPs ==
Chicago Prep Bowl MVPs
Year	MVP	Team (league)
1951	Rich Finger	Lindblom (CPL)
1952	Frank Penn	Mount Carmel (CCL)
1953	Tom Akroid	Saint George (CCL)
1954	Jack Delveaux and Ron Nietupski	Fenger (CPL)
1955	Bob Guillen	Chicago Vocational (CPL)
1956	Rich Boyle	Leo (CCL)
1957	Mike Lind	Calumet (CPL) –losing team
1958	Larry Preo	Austin (CPL)
1959	George Bunda	Lane Tech (CPL)
1960	Tony Carey	Mount Carmel (CCL)
1961	Jim Gruber	Lane Tech (CPL) –losing team
1962	Jim DiLullo	Fenwick (CCL)
1963	John Byrne	St. Rita (CCL)
1964	Rich "Chico" Kurzawski	Weber (CCL)
1965	Ken Krajchovich	Loyola Academy (CCL)
1966	Jack Spellman	Loyola Academy (CCL)
1967	Dave Zuccareili	Mount Carmel (CCL)
1968	Rich Wyatt	Mendel (CCL)
1969	John Foran	Loyola Academy (CCL)
1970	Neil Sullivan	St. Rita (CCL)
1971	Billy Marek	St. Rita (CCL)
1972	Steve Malley	St. Laurence (CCL)
2003	Liam Stanton	Loyola Academy (CCL)
2016	Michael Kennedy	Mount Carmel (CCL)
2021	Frankie Ricciardi	Notre Dame (CCL)
2022	Luke D'Alise	Simeon (CPL)
2024	Jack Wanzung	St. Ignatius (CCL)

== Winning coaches ==
Chicago Prep Bowl winning coaches
Year	Coach	Team (league)
1950	Terry Brennan	Mount Carmel (CCL)
1951	Terry Brennan	Mount Carmel (CCL)
1952	Terry Brennan	Mount Carmel (CCL)
1956	Jim Arneberg	Leo (CCL)
1960	Tom Carey	Mount Carmel (CCL)
1964	Joe Sassano	Weber (CCL)
1965	Bob Naughton	Loyola Academy (CCL)
1966	Bernie O'Brien	Loyola Academy (CCL)
1967	Frank Maloney	Mount Carmel (CCL)
1968	Loui Guida	Mendel (CCL)
1969	Bob Spoo	Loyola Academy (CCL)
1970	Pat Cronin	St. Rita (CCL)
1972	Tom Kavanaugh	St. Laurence (CCL)
1979	JW Smith	Julian (CPL)
2003	Carl Favaro	Loyola Academy (CCL)
2021	Mike Hennessey	Notre Dame (CCL)
2024	Matt Miller	St. Ignatius (CCL)

== See also ==
- List of events at Soldier Field
