= Eckersall Park and Stadium =

Recreation facilities in Chicago, Illinois

Eckersall Park and Eckersall Stadium are recreation facilities located in the South Chicago neighborhood of Chicago, Illinois. The adjacently-located facilities, respectively, are a Chicago Park District (CPD) park and a Chicago Public Schools sports stadium. The park was created by the CPD as part of new parks construction program undertaken in the years after World War II.

== Park ==
Eckersall Park
- Location: 2400 East 82nd Street, Chicago, Illinois
- Coordinates: 41.7467°N 87.5649°W
- Area: 2.98 acres (1.21 ha)
- Established: 1945
- Owner: Chicago Park District
- Operator: Chicago Park District

The Chicago Park District park occupies 2.98 acres (1.21 ha) of land. It features a playground, outdoor basketball court, and a field.

The park was constructed as part of a CPD initiative to establish new parks in the years following World War II. This followed a long period in which the city's park system had seen no new parks added. A "Ten Year Plan" was outlined which identified 43 sites in the city to prioritize the establishment of new parks, targeting previously underdeveloped neighborhoods that lacked recreational facilities and were now experiencing post-war population growth. The program was estimated to cost $60 million, and the park district began selling $24 million in municipal bonds in 1945 to fund its first phase. One of the first properties acquired 3 acres (1.2 ha) of land in the South Chicago neighborhood for Eckersall Park.

Both the park and the adjacent stadium are named for Walter Eckersall.

== Stadium ==
Eckersall Stadium
- Address: 2423 East 82nd Street; Chicago, Illinois; United States
- Coordinates: 41.7456°N 87.5649°W
- Owner: City of Chicago
- Operator: Chicago Public Schools
- Type: Stadium
- Surface: artificial turf (playing field)
- Current use: Football, Soccer, track and field

Construction
- Opened: 1949
- Renovated: 2018, 2024

Tenant
- Chicago Public League; Mount Carmel HS Caravans football (CPL), formerly

Adjacent to the CPD-operated playground is Eckersall Stadium, a sports facility operated by Chicago Public Schools (CPS). It is one of seven stadiums operated by Chicago Public Schools, which play host to Chicago Public League sporting events. As of 2022, it was the site of approximately 1,000 games each year.

The stadium was built in 1949. It was renovated in 2018 and 2024. The 2018 renovations of the stadium were completed as part of the Chicago city government's "Building on Burnham" parks renovation plan, an initiative which the city launched in 2011. In August 2018, Mayor Rahm Emanuel and area alderman Gregory Mitchell participated in a ribbon cutting ceremony marking the completion of that renovation. The renovation was touted as enhancing the venue's quality as a community asset that the local government planned to continue using for community events, including local Special Olympics competitions. CPS played a role in shaping the renovations. The renovations added artificial turf to the football field, renovated the running track, and added new facilities for the staging of discus, high jump, pole vault, and shot put competitions.

At one time, the Chicago Catholic League football team of Mount Carmel High School played their home games at the stadium. However, the team left for Gately Stadium, where they played for many decades before moving to an on-campus venue in 2019.

The stadium and adjacent park were used as a filming location for the film The Express: The Ernie Davis Story, released in 2008.
