= Edgewater Castle FC =

Soccer club in Edgewater, Chicago

Edgewater Castle
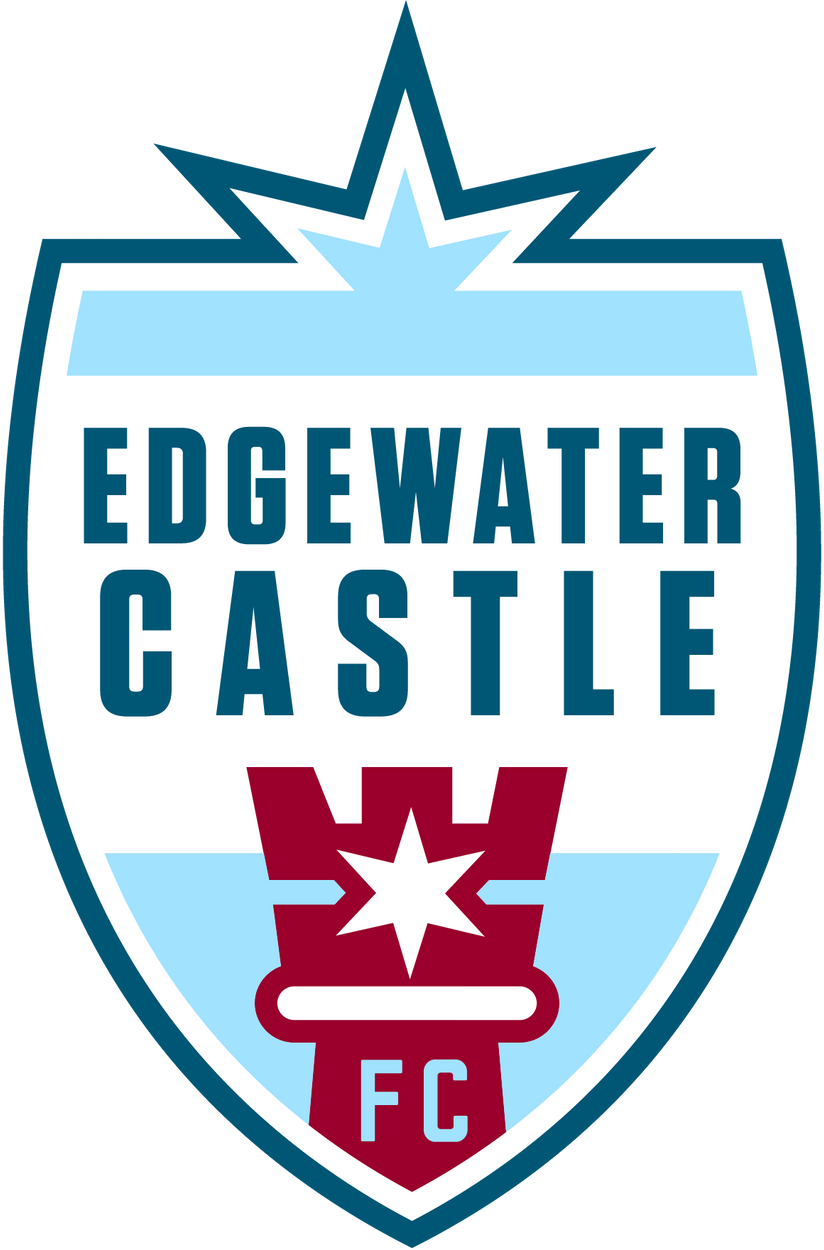
- Full name: Edgewater Castle Football Club
- Nickname: Rooks
- Short name: ECFC
- Founded: 2017; 9 years ago
- Ground: Winnemac Stadium
- Capacity: 4,500
- Coach: Duygu Erdoğan
- League: Midwest Premier League Heartland Conference Division 2 (2025); USL League Two (2026)
- Website: edgewatercastlefc.com
Home colors	Away colors

Edgewater Castle Football Club, commonly referred to as simply Edgewater Castle or ECFC, is a semi-professional soccer club in Edgewater, Chicago, recognized for its community focus and commitment to free player participation. Founded in 2017 with a "Soccer For All" philosophy, the club includes both men's and women's teams, which are set to join the national USL League Two and USL W League in 2026.

ECFC home matches are held at Winnemac Stadium, and the organization supports free youth programming through its Edgewater Castle Football Foundation. The women's team secured the club's first national title by winning the United Women's Soccer National Championship in 2025.

== History ==
Edgewater Castle FC was founded in 2017 by James Kitia and Andrew Swanson to provide accessible football opportunities for low-income, immigrant, and refugee communities on Chicago’s North Side. The club adopted a Free to Play model from the beginning and, working through its non-profit foundation, offered camps, clinics, and pick-up sessions. Over its first eight years, more than 3,000 young people took part in these programs.

The club's women's team joined United Women's Soccer in 2023.

During the early to mid 2020s the club expanded its football structures and became a community-owned organization with more than 50 owners, including former United States international Kellyn Acosta. It also began producing players who went on to professional careers in England, Italy, Dubai, and Major League Soccer.

In 2025, both senior teams recorded successes. The men’s first team won the Heartland Division II title in the Midwest Premier League and secured promotion. The women’s first team, coached by Emma Woodley, completed a 9 wins, 0 draws, 0 losses season in United Women’s Soccer and won the UWS National Championship. Over the same year, Woodley also led North Park University to a national collegiate title.

In 2026, the club joined the United Soccer League (USL) system, with the men's side entering USL League Two and the women's side entering the USL W League.

== Stadium ==
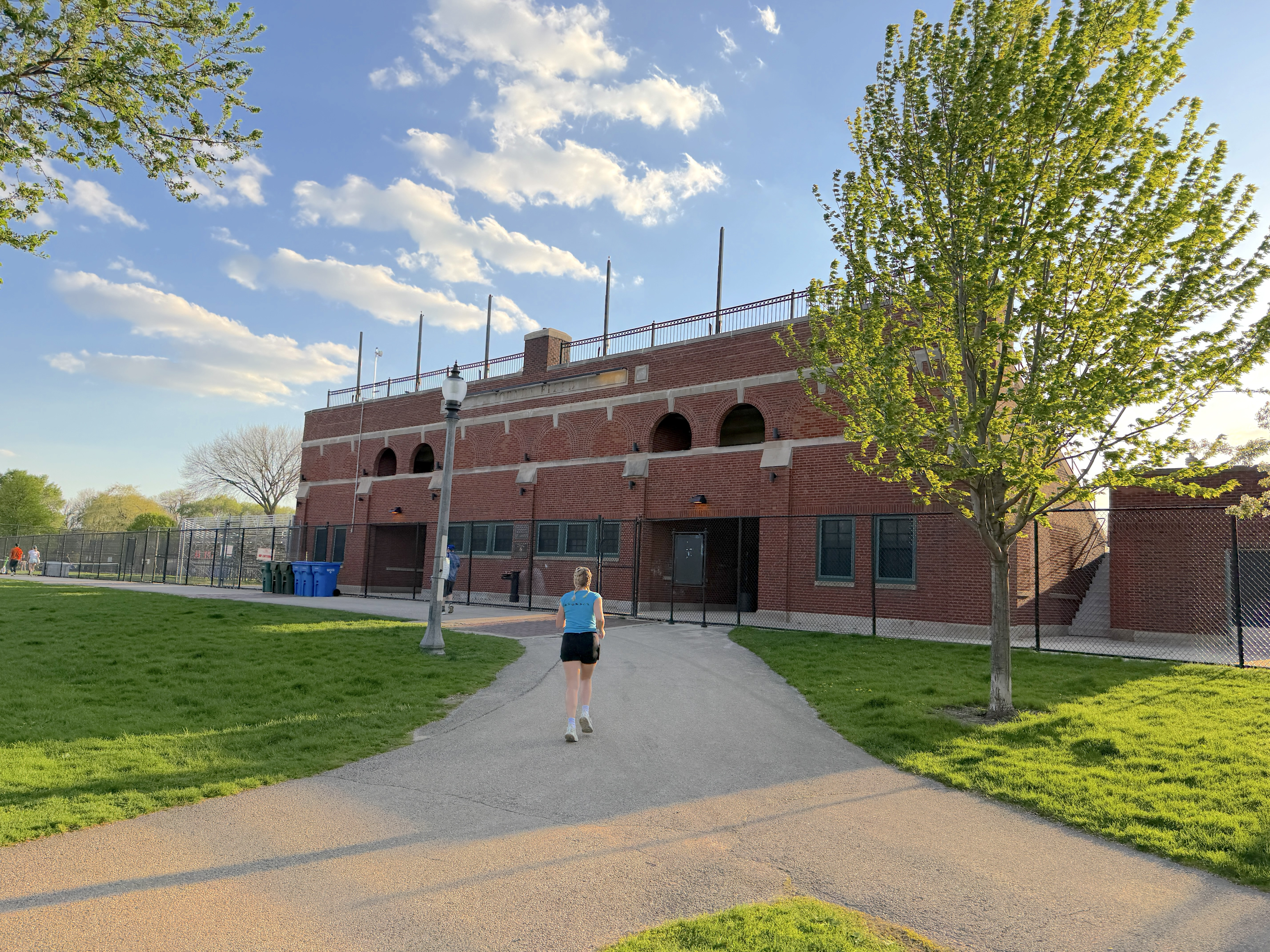
Winnemac Stadium, the club's home venue

Since 2026, the club plays its home venues at Winnemac Stadium in the Ravenswood area, a 4,500-seat stadium. It is one of seven stadiums operated by Chicago Public Schools, which play host to Chicago Public League sporting events. As of 2022, it was holding approximately 1,000 games each year.

Winnemac Stadium was constructed in the 1930s. Like the park, its takes its name from the Potawatomi chief name "Winamac". Since 2004, its sports turf has been named "Jorndt Field", after teacher Louis C. Jorndt. The stadium's grandstand is brick-clad, and has a seating capacity of 4,500.

ECFC home matches were previosuly held at Loyola University Chicago's Hoyne Field.

Besides, North Park University's Holmgren Athletic Complex acts as an alternate venue.

== Club culture and identity ==
=== Logo ===
The club's logo features light blue fields representing the Chicago flag along with Lake Michigan and the Chicago sky, and a maroon castle tower reflecting the color of traditional Chicago brickwork and the club’s nickname, the Rooks.

The logo was designed by Jen Dorman, a longtime friend of one of the club’s co-founders.

== Players ==
=== Men's first team roster ===
As of May 1, 2025

Note: Flags indicate national team as defined under FIFA eligibility rules; some limited exceptions apply. Players may hold more than one non-FIFA nationality.

No.	Pos.	Nation	Player
0	GK	USA	Aidan Crawford
1	GK	USA	Greg Stellatos
99	GK	USA	Joey Galante
55	GK	ECU	Luis Urguiles
5	DF	USA	Quentin Benedetto
3	DF	USA	Ameer Abdullah
15	DF	NOR	Christian Valaand
31	DF	USA	Diego De Iira
13	DF	CRC	Kervin Kenton
2	DF	USA	Lucas Sampson
28	DF	USA	Nicklas Kanzok

No.	Pos.	Nation	Player
16	DF	USA	Rafael Santos
19	DF	USA	Roberto Cardano
23	DF	USA	Tobi Wimmer
26	DF	SWE	Vidar Rydell
22	MF	USA	Alan Rubio
27	MF	USA	Alan Alonso
4	MF	USA	Alex Gomes

No.	Pos.	Nation	Player
8	MF	UKR	Alex Kreminsky
10	MF	COL	Andres Rocha
25	MF	USA	Andrew Miranda
18	MF	HON	Darrell Turcios
21	MF	USA	Eduardo "Lalo" Aguilera
16	MF	USA	Gino Miranda
—	MF	USA	Louis Dush-Hart
29	MF	MNE	Milos Vucic
11	FW	USA	Enzo Dagatti
7	FW	USA	Bardia Kimiavi
—	FW	USA	David Balase
—	FW	USA	Franco Sovero
20	FW	USA	Kevin Tagbae
9	FW	USA	Murtadha Kamil
—	FW	NGR	Qudus Lawal
14	FW	POR	Rui Reis
12	FW	GHA	William Acheampong
