= List of Chicago Public Schools stadiums =

List of public school stadiums in Chicago IL

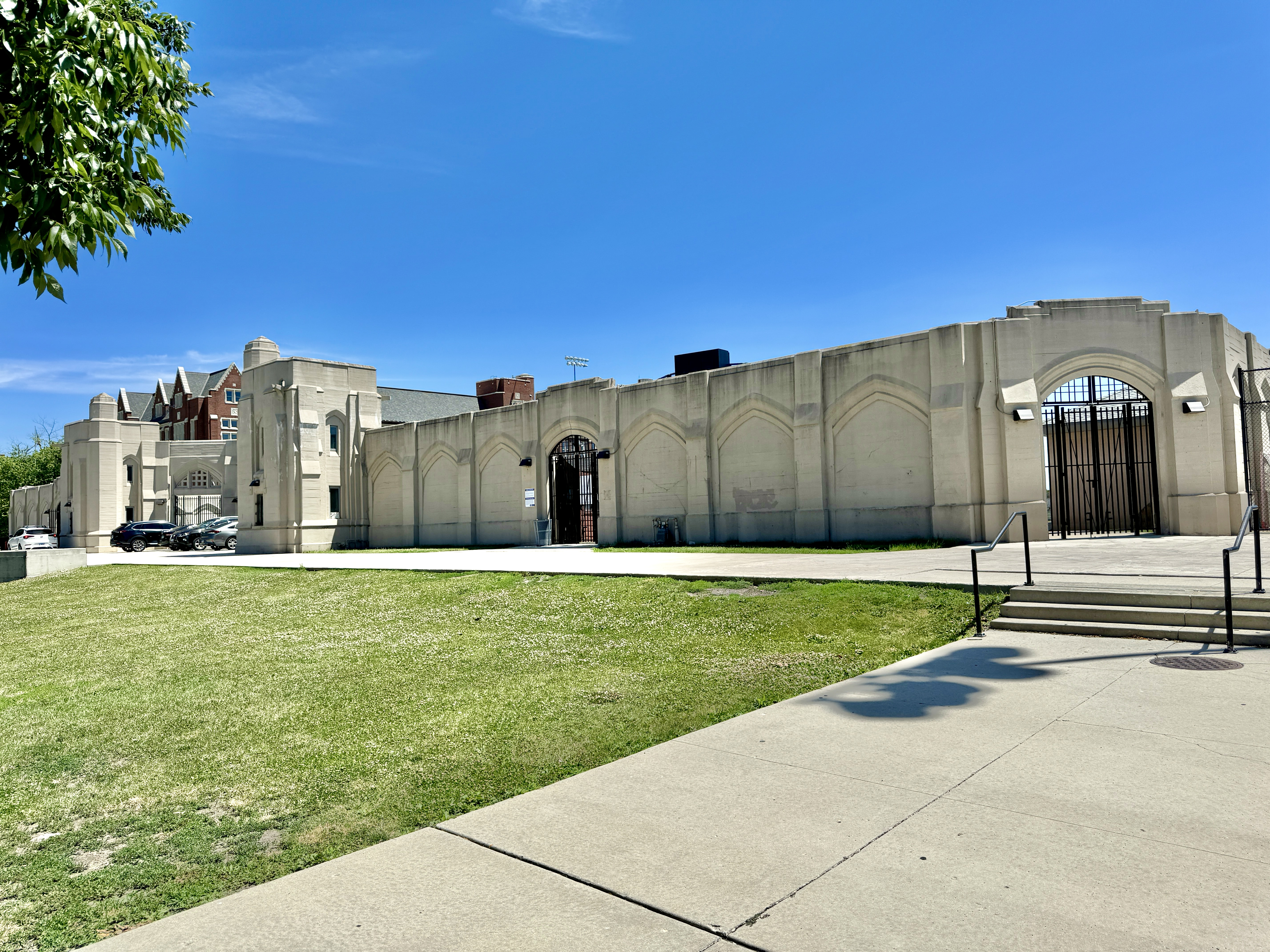
Exterior of Lane Stadium, photographed in 2024

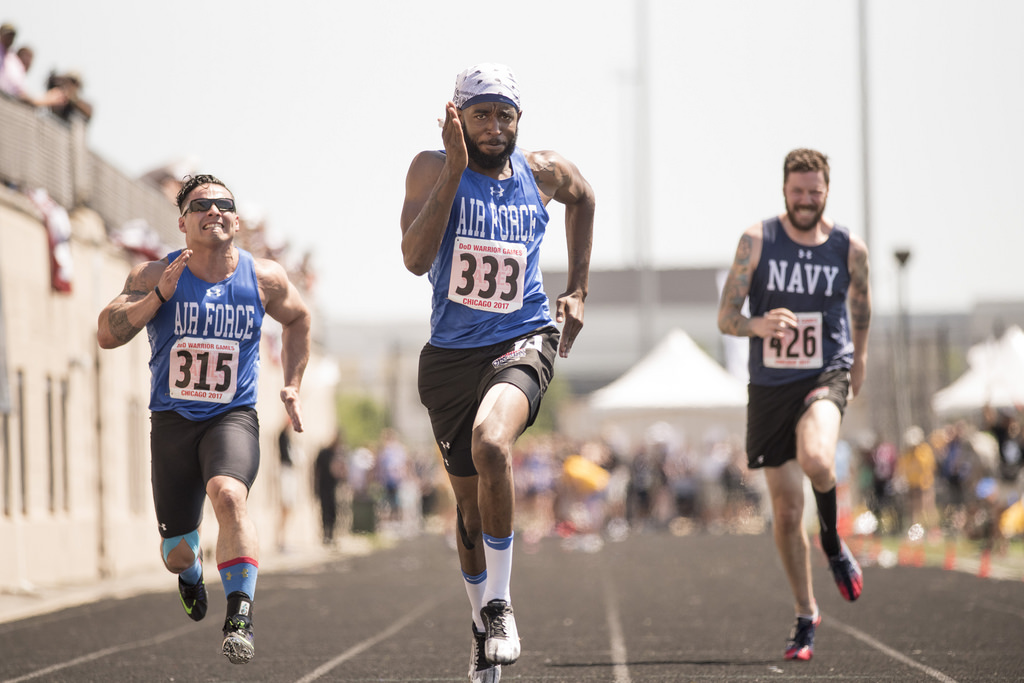
Track competition at Lane Stadium during the 2017 Warrior Games

Winnemac Stadium, photographed in 2026

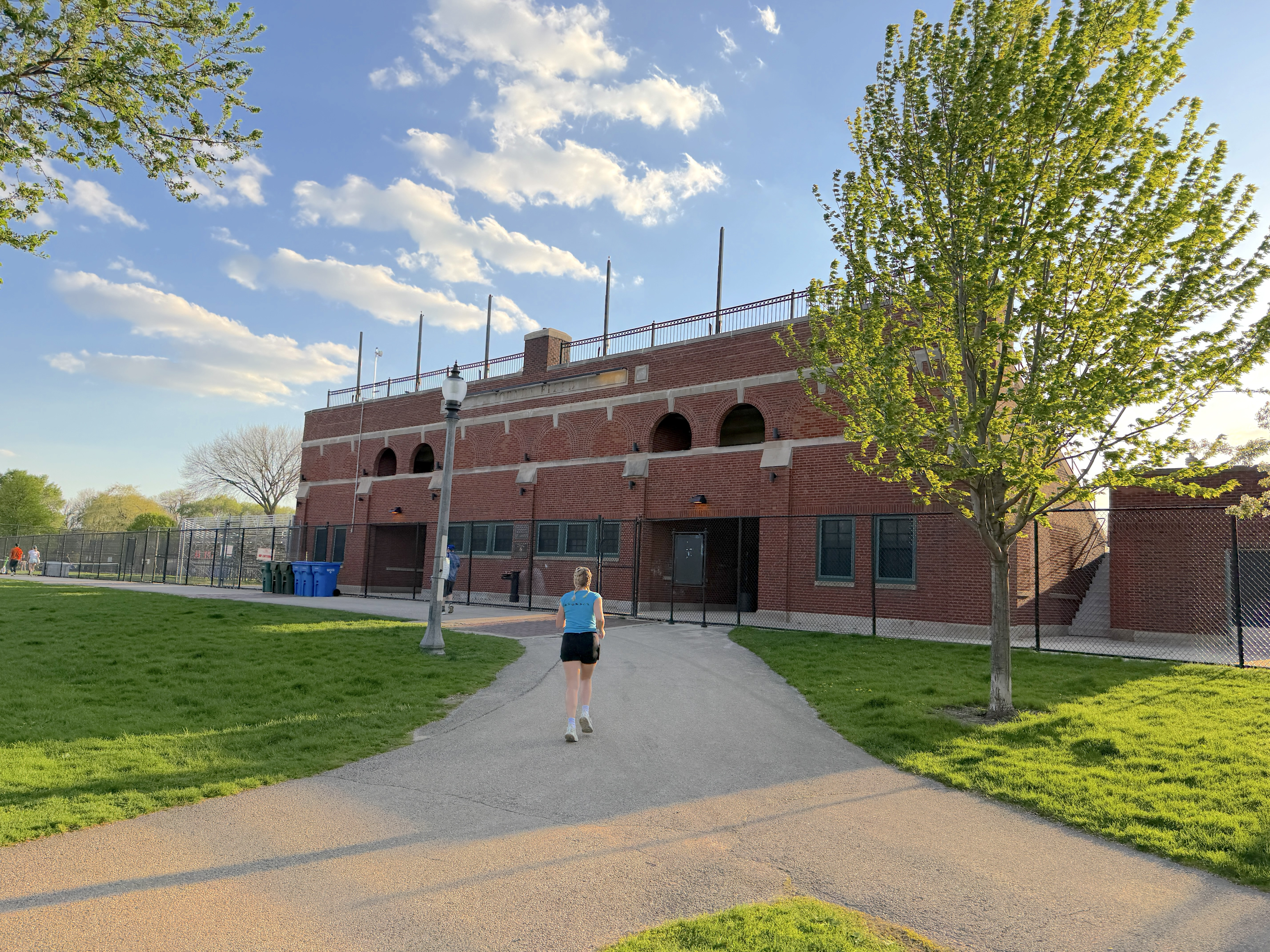
Exterior view of the east grandstand of Winnemac Field

Chicago Public Schools operates seven municipally owned stadiums across Chicago, which are used for Chicago Public League sports events.

== Use for Chicago Public League games ==
As of 2022, each of the stadiums (with the exception of Hanson Stadium) was the site of approximately 1,000 games each year. At that time, Hanson Stadium had been infrequently used due to its state of poor repair, but it has since been renovated in 2025.

== List ==
List of stadiums
Stadium	Location	Year built	Year(s) renovated	Capacity	Namesake of	Notes
Eckersall Stadium	2423 East 82nd Street	1949	2018, 2024		Walter Eckersall (Note: both Eckersall Stadium and the surrounding Eckersall park are namesakes of Walter Eckersall)	
Gately Stadium	810 East 103rd Street	1955	2011	5,000	James H. Gately (Note: both the stadium and the surrounding park, Gately Park, are namesakes of James H. Gately)	in 1959, a temporary outdoor velodrome was erected at the stadium to host the track cycling competition of the 1959 Pan American Games
Hanson Stadium	2233 North Central Avenue		2025	10,000	Hanson Family (Note: whose farm once occupied the land that Hanson Stadium and Hanson Park are located upon)	
Lane Stadium	2601 West Addison Street	1934	2007, 2015	4,800	Albert G. Lane (Note: Lane Tech College Prep High School, where the stadium is located, is named for Lane)	since 2020, football turf is named "Fritz Pollard Field at Lane Stadium"; the stadium is the home venue of the DePaul Blue Demons collegiate track and field teams (NCAA Division I)
Rockne Stadium	1117 South Central Avenue		2007, 2022–2024		Knute Rockne	
Stagg Stadium	1035 West 74th Street		2024		Amos Alonzo Stagg	
Winnemac Stadium	5105 North Leavitt Street	1930s		4,500	Winamac (Note: indirect namesake, as the stadium and the park it is located inside of (Winnemac Park) are named for the adjacent Winnemac Street, which is itself named for a Potawatomi chief who used the name "Winamac" (meaning "catfish"), who had signed the 1795 Treaty of Greenville (in which Great Lakes tribes surrendered Chicago to the United States government) and later died fighting in alliance with the United States against the British in the War of 1812.)	since 2004, the sports turf has been named "Jorndt Field", after teacher Louis C. Jorndt
