= Chicago Circle Chikas football =

American college football team

- First season: 1965; 61 years ago
- Last season: 1973; 53 years ago
- Location: Chicago, Illinois, U.S.
- Stadium: Soldier Field, Gately Stadium, Winnemac Stadium, Hanson Stadium
- NCAA division: Division III
- Conference: Independent
- All-time record: 16–55–1 (.229)

The Chicago Circle Chikas football team represented the University of Illinois at Chicago Circle (UICC) (now known as the University of Illinois Chicago (Note: From 1965–1982, UIC was known as University of Illinois at Chicago Circle. In September 1982, UICC merged with the University of Illinois at the Medical Center, and the consolidated university was renamed the University of Illinois at Chicago.)) from the 1965 through 1973 season. Between 1950 through 1964, UICC was known as University of Illinois Chicago Undergraduate Division located at Navy Pier, and competed as a junior college. Known as the Chicago Illini during their years competing at Navy Pier, with the move to their new campus, the athletic teams were inspired by the Chickasaw and renamed Chikas. (Note: After its consolidation with the University of Illinois at the Medical Center in 1982, students from both UICC and the Medical Center voted to change the athletic nickname to Flames.) UICC played its home games at multiple stadiums throughout their history with the most recent being Soldier Field. The Chikas program was dropped by the University at the conclusion of their 1973 season.

== Strnad years (1965–1968) ==
George Strnad served as head coach of the Chikas from 1964 to 1968, and played as a member of the first team at Navy Pier in 1950. During his tenure as head coach after becoming a four-year school, the Chikas compiled an overall record of 13 wins, 18 losses, and one tie (.422 winning percentage).

=== 1965 ===
1965 Chicago Circle Chikas football
- Conference: Gateway Conference
- Record: 1–7 (1–3 Gateway)
- Head coach: George Strnad (2nd season)

1965 Gateway Conference football standings
	Conf.					Overall
Team	W		L		T	W		L		T
Northwestern (WI) $	4	–	0	–	0	6	–	1	–	0
Milton	3	–	1	–	0	4	–	3	–	0
Lakeland	2	–	2	–	0	5	–	3	–	0
Illinois–Chicago	1	–	3	–	0	1	–	7	–	0
Eureka	0	–	4	–	0	1	–	7	–	0
$ – Conference champion

The 1965 Chicago Circle Chikas football team was an American football team that represented the University of Illinois at Chicago Circle (UICC) (now known as the University of Illinois Chicago) as a member of the Gateway Conference during the 1965 NAIA football season. In their second season under head coach George Strnad, UICC compiled a 1–7 record.

After losing three consecutive games to open the season, the Chikas defeated Eureka for their only win of the season. Their 47–6 loss against the Northwestern Trojans late in the season clinched the 1965 Gateway Conference championship for the Trojans.

Date	Opponent	Site	Result	Source
September 25	at Lakeland	Sheboygan, WI	L 6–25	
October 2	Milton	Gately Stadium; Chicago, IL	L 7–31	
October 9	at Indiana Central*	Indianapolis, IN	L 6–22	
October 23	at Eureka	Eureka, IL	W 7–0	
October 30	Milwaukee*	Gately Stadium; Chicago, IL	L 7–48	
November 6	Illinois College*	Gately Stadium; Chicago, IL	L 12–52	
November 13	Northwestern (WI)	Gately Stadium; Chicago, IL	L 6–47	
November 20	at Concordia (IL)*	River Forest, IL	L 14–20	
*Non-conference game

=== 1966 ===
1966 Chicago Circle Chikas football
- Conference: Independent
- Record: 3–4
- Head coach: George Strnad (3rd season)

1966 Gateway Conference football standings
	Conf.					Overall
Team	W		L		T	W		L		T
Milton $	3	–	0	–	0	5	–	4	–	0
Northwestern (WI)	2	–	1	–	0	3	–	5	–	0
Lakeland	1	–	2	–	0	3	–	6	–	0
Eureka	0	–	3	–	0	0	–	7	–	0
$ – Conference champion

The 1966 Chicago Circle Chikas football team was an American football team that represented the University of Illinois at Congress Circle (UICC) (now known as the University of Illinois Chicago) as an independent during the 1966 NAIA football season. In their third season under head coach George Strnad, Chicago Circle compiled a 3–4 record.

The 1966 season featured the first Chikas game played at Soldier Field, they defeated Lakeland, 20–17, on homecoming.

Date	Opponent	Site	Result	Attendance	Source
September 24	Northland (WI)	Gately Stadium; Chicago, IL	L 12–13		
October 7	Indiana Central	Gately Stadium; Chicago, IL	W 21–2		
October 15	Wayne State (MI)	Gately Stadium; Chicago, IL	W 39–36	1,000	
October 22	at Milwaukee	Shorewood Stadium; Shorewood, WI	L 49–7	4,000	
October 29	Lakeland^{†}	Soldier Field; Chicago, IL	W 20–17		
November 5	at Illinois College	Jacksonville, IL	L 7–14		
November 12	at Concordia (IL)	River Forest, IL	L 26–34		
^{†}Homecoming

=== 1967 ===
1967 Chicago Circle Chikas football
- Conference: Independent
- Record: 5–3–1
- Head coach: George Strnad (4th season)

The 1967 Chicago Circle Chikas football team was an American football team that represented the University of Illinois at Congress Circle (UICC) (now known as the University of Illinois Chicago) as an independent during the 1967 NAIA football season. In their fourth season under head coach George Strnad, UICC compiled a 5–3–1 record.

For the 1967 season, the Chikas played their four home games at four different facilities: Winnemac Stadium, Gately Stadium, Soldier Field, and Hanson Stadium. As UICC did not have an on-campus facility, playing in four stadiums across Chicago was viewed as a means to grow the profile of the fledgling program Their 5–3–1 record for the season marked the first and only winning season for the Chikas as a four-year school.

Date	Opponent	Site	Result	Attendance	Source
September 23	at Indiana Central	Indianapolis, IN	W 7–6		
September 30	Illinois State	Winnemac Stadium; Chicago, IL	L 14–16		
October 7	at Wayne State (MI)	Wayne Stadium; Detroit, MI	L 5–31	1,329	
October 14	Illinois College	Gately Stadium; Chicago, IL	W 21–7		
October 21	Milwaukee^{†}	Soldier Field; Chicago, IL	W 20–6		
October 28	at Lakeland	Sheboygan, WI	L 19–41		
November 4	Eastern Illinois	Hanson Stadium; Chicago, IL	T 6–6	200	
November 11	at Northland (WI)	Ashland, WI	W 27–7		
November 18	at Concordia (IL)	River Forest, IL	W 26–13		
^{†}Homecoming

=== 1968 ===
1968 Chicago Circle Chikas football
- Conference: Independent
- Record: 4–4
- Head coach: George Strnad (5th season)
- Home stadium: Soldier Field

The 1968 Chicago Circle Chikas football team was an American football team that represented the University of Illinois at Congress Circle (UICC) (now known as the University of Illinois Chicago) as an independent during the 1968 NAIA football season. In their final season under head coach George Strnad, UICC compiled a 4–4 record.

In their game against Wayne State, the Tartars linebacker Ron Solack sustained a double-puncture to his intestine that resulted in his death on October 25.

Date	Opponent	Site	Result	Attendance	Source
September 21	Indiana Central	Soldier Field; Chicago, IL	W 35–14		
September 28	at Illinois State	Hancock Stadium; Normal, IL	L 14–26	13,000–14,000	
October 4	Wayne State (MI)	Soldier Field; Chicago, IL	W 13–0	3,500	
October 12	at Southwest Missouri State	SMS Stadium; Springfield, MO	W 21–14		
October 19	at Milwaukee	Milwaukee County Stadium; Milwaukee, WI	W 19–3	7,129	
November 2	Eastern Illinois	Soldier Field; Chicago, IL	L 7–8	5,000	
November 9	at St. Procopius	Lisle, IL	L 34–35		
November 16	at Concordia (IL)	River Forest, IL	L 13–20		

== Nemoto years (1969–1973) ==
Harold Nemoto was named as head coach of the Chikas in July 1969 to replace George Strnad. Nemoto previously spent 12 years as an assistant coach at Circle/Navy Pier, and was considered the best lineman to ever play at the University as a student in the 1950s. During his tenure as head coach, the Chikas compiled an overall record of 3 wins and 37 losses (.075 winning percentage).

=== 1969 ===
1969 Chicago Circle Chikas football
- Conference: Independent
- Record: 1–7
- Head coach: Harold Nemoto (1st season)
- Home stadium: Soldier Field

The 1969 Chicago Circle Chikas football team was an American football team that represented the University of Illinois at Congress Circle (UICC) (now known as the University of Illinois Chicago) as an independent during the 1969 NAIA football season. In their first season under head coach Harold Nemoto, UICC compiled a 1–7 record.

Date	Opponent	Site	Result	Attendance	Source
September 20	Winona State	Soldier Field; Chicago, IL	L 7–36		
September 27	at Eastern Illinois	Lincoln Field; Charleston, IL	L 6–52	4,500	
October 4	at Delta State	Delta Field; Cleveland, MS	L 0–84		
October 10	Missouri–Rolla	Soldier Field; Chicago, IL	L 6–14		
October 18	Milwaukee	Soldier Field; Chicago, IL	L 13–15		
October 25	at Missouri Valley	Marshall, MO	L 24–28		
November 1	at Wayne State (MI)	Wayne Stadium; Detroit, MI	L 0–33	1,875	
November 8	St. Procopius	Soldier Field; Chicago, IL	W 20–7		

=== 1970 ===
1970 Chicago Circle Chikas football
- Conference: Independent
- Record: 0–8
- Head coach: Harold Nemoto (2nd season)
- Home stadium: Soldier Field

The 1970 Chicago Circle Chikas football team was an American football team that represented the University of Illinois at Congress Circle (UICC) (now known as the University of Illinois Chicago) as an independent during the 1970 NAIA Division II football season. In their third season under head coach Harold Nemoto, UICC compiled an 0–8 record.

Date	Opponent	Site	Result	Attendance	Source
September 26	Eastern Illinois	Soldier Field; Chicago, IL	L 6–20	500	
October 2	Southwest Missouri State	Soldier Field; Chicago, IL	L 13–26		
October 10	at Missouri–Rolla	Jackling Field; Rolla, MO	L 0–53		
October 17	at Milwaukee	Milwaukee County Stadium; Milwaukee, WI	L 6–51		
October 24	at Ferris State	Big Rapids, MI	L 0–47		
October 31	Wayne State (MI)	Soldier Field; Chicago, IL	L 8–24		
November 7	Luther	Soldier Field; Chicago, IL	L 13–55		
November 14	at Winona State	Maxwell Field; Winona, MN	L 0–54		

=== 1971 ===
1971 Chicago Circle Chikas football
- Conference: Independent
- Record: 2–6
- Head coach: Harold Nemoto (3rd season)
- Home stadium: Soldier Field

The 1971 Chicago Circle Chikas football team was an American football team that represented the University of Illinois at Congress Circle (UICC) (now known as the University of Illinois Chicago) as an independent during the 1971 NAIA Division II football season. In their third season under head coach Harold Nemoto, UICC compiled a 2–6 record.

Date	Opponent	Site	Result	Attendance	Source
September 24	Grand Valley State	Soldier Field; Chicago, IL	W 27–7		
October 2	at Eastern Illinois	O'Brien Field; Charleston, IL	L 21–43	6,900	
October 9	at Carthage	Kensoha, WI	L 7–47		
October 16	Milwaukee	Soldier Field; Chicago, IL	L 0–41		
October 23	Ferris State	Soldier Field; Chicago, IL	L 21–24		
October 30	at Wayne State (MI)	Wayne Stadium; Detroit, MI	L 0–37	1,541	
November 6	at Luther	Decorah, IA	L 0–55		
November 13	Winona State	Soldier Field; Chicago, IL	W 19–11		

=== 1972 ===
1972 Chicago Circle Chikas football
- Conference: Independent
- Record: 0–8
- Head coach: Harold Nemoto (4th season)
- Home stadium: Soldier Field

The 1972 Chicago Circle Chikas football team was an American football team that represented the University of Illinois at Congress Circle (UICC) (now known as the University of Illinois Chicago) as an independent during the 1972 NAIA Division II football season. In their fourth season under head coach Harold Nemoto, UICC compiled an 0–8 record.

Date	Opponent	Site	Result	Attendance	Source
September 23	at Winona State	Maxwell Field; Winona, MN	L 0–13		
September 30	Eastern Illinois	Soldier Field; Chicago, IL	L 13–28	500	
October 7	Mankato State	Soldier Field; Chicago, IL	L 0–60		
October 14	at Milwaukee	Shorewood Stadium; Shorewood, WI	L 0–28		
October 21	at Ferris State	Big Rapids, MI	L 0–63		
October 28	Wayne State (MI)	Soldier Field; Chicago, IL	L 0–34	250	
November 4	at Wisconsin–Platteville	Pioneer Stadium; Platteville, WI	L 6–31		
November 11	Hope	Soldier Field; Chicago, IL	L 14–32		

=== 1973 ===
1973 Chicago Circle Chikas football
- Conference: Independent
- Record: 0–8
- Head coach: Harold Nemoto (5th season)
- Home stadium: Soldier Field

The 1973 Chicago Circle Chikas football team was an American football team that represented the University of Illinois at Congress Circle (UICC) (now known as the University of Illinois Chicago) as an independent during the 1973 NCAA Division III football season. In their final season under head coach Harold Nemoto, UICC compiled an 0–8 record.

In early November the University stated the Chikas football program was to be dropped by the university at the conclusion of the season.

Date	Opponent	Site	Result	Attendance	Source
September 21	Grand Valley State	Soldier Field; Chicago, IL	L 8–40		
September 29	at Eastern Illinois	O'Brien Field; Charleston, IL	L 8–40	8,000	
October 6	at Mankato State	Blakeslee Stadium; Mankato, MN	L 7–55		
October 13	Milwaukee	Soldier Field; Chicago, IL	L 0–32		
October 19	Ferris State	Soldier Field; Chicago, IL	L 0–58		
October 27	at Wayne State (MI)	Wayne Stadium; Detroit, MI	L 14–46	3,000	
November 3	Wisconsin–Platteville	Soldier Field; Chicago, IL	L 6–53		
November 10	at Hope	Riverview Park; Holland, MI	L 16–48		
