= Winnemac Park =

Park in Chicago, Illinois, United States

- Location: 5100 North Leavitt Street, Chicago, Illinois
- Coordinates: 41.974°N 87.682°W
- Area: 22.38 acres (9.06 ha)
- Established: 1910
- Owner: Chicago Park District and Chicago Public Schools
- Operator: Chicago Park District and Chicago Public Schools
- Public transit: Brown Damen and Western; 49, 49B, 50, 80, 92; UPN at Ravenswood
- Website: https://www.chicagoparkdistrict.com/parks-facilities/winnemac-park

Winnemac Park is a park located in the Lincoln Square neighborhood of Chicago, Illinois. Portions of the park are owned by the Chicago Park District, while other portions are owned by Chicago Public Schools. The park is home to two public school buildings, as well as Winnemac Stadium (one of seven stadiums that Chicago Public Schools operates for use by the Chicago Public League). The park's stadium has also been used by various semi-professional sports teams. A portion of the park's landscape is dedicated to native prairie plant species.

== Overview ==
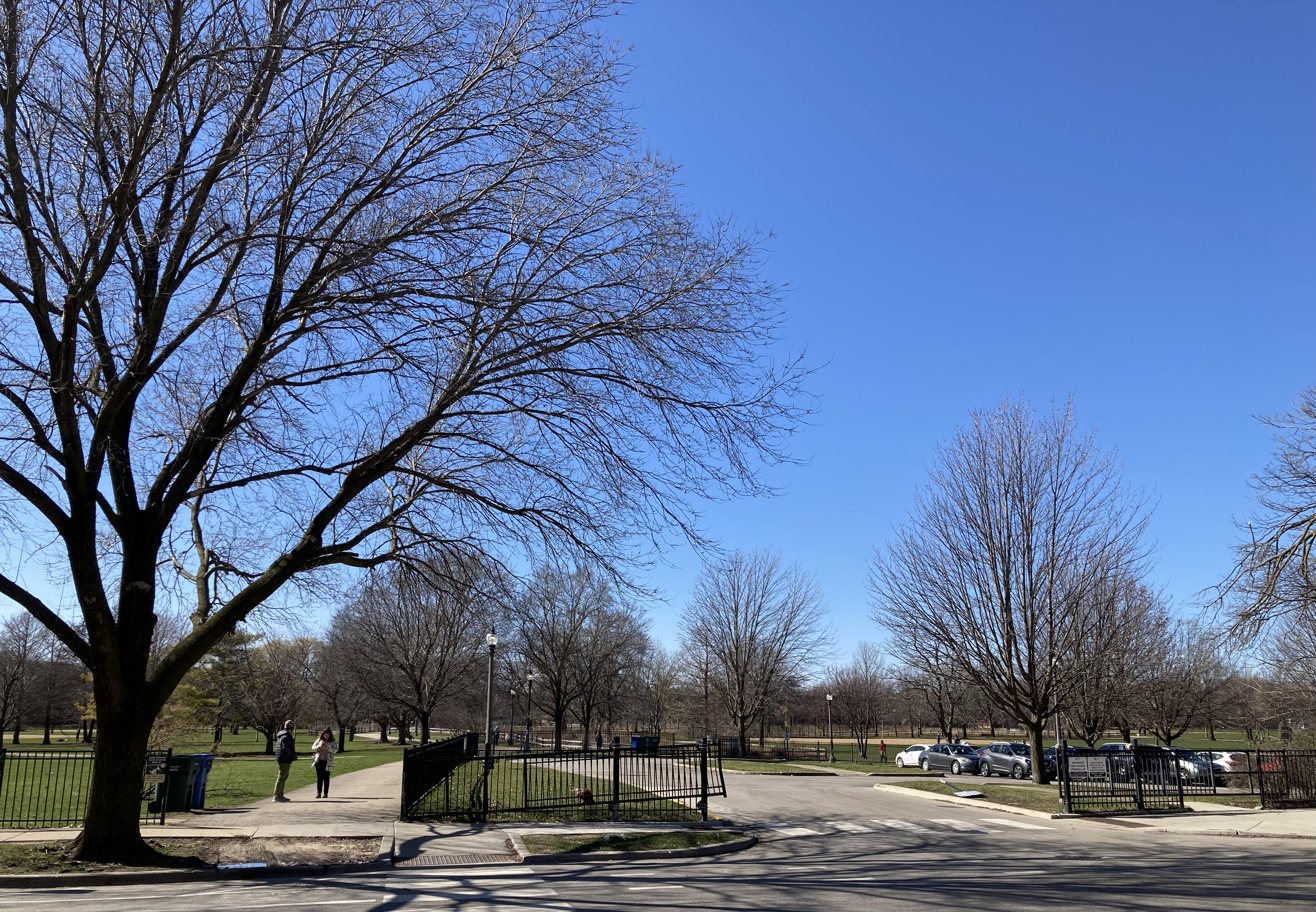
East entrance of the park (photographed in 2024)

The park is located in the Lincoln Square community of Chicago. It takes its name from the adjacent Winnemac Street, which itself is named after Potawatomi chief name "Winamac", which meant "catfish" and was the name used by a chief who signed the 1795 Treaty of Greenville (in which Great Lakes tribes surrendered Chicago to the United States government), and who later fighting in alliance with the United States against the British in the War of 1812.

Portions of the park are owned by the Chicago Park District (CPD), while other portions are owned by Chicago Public Schools (CPS).

The park was first established in 1910 by the City of Chicago's Special Parks Commission, being constructed on land it leased from the Chicago Board of Education. The land had, which had previously been used as a small farm, was graded and landscaped into a park with numerous athletic fields. In 1929, the Board of Education constructed Amundsen High School in the northeast corner of the park. In 1937, it added Chappell Elementary School to the west of the high school.

In 1993, ownership of the green space south of Winnemac Street was transferred from the Board of Education to the Chicago Park District, to be made an official part of the city's park system. In 2001, the Chicago Public Building Commission gave the CPD further ownership of a section of Winnemac Park south Winnemac Street measuring 14 acres (5.7 ha).

The park was renovated in 1999 at a cost of $2 million. The renovation saw 200 new trees planted and a natural prairie area added to the park's landscape. In its 2021 "Best of Chicago" edition, Chicago Reader recognized the park as its runner-up for "Best Neighborhood Park" (behind Humboldt Park).

== Facilities ==
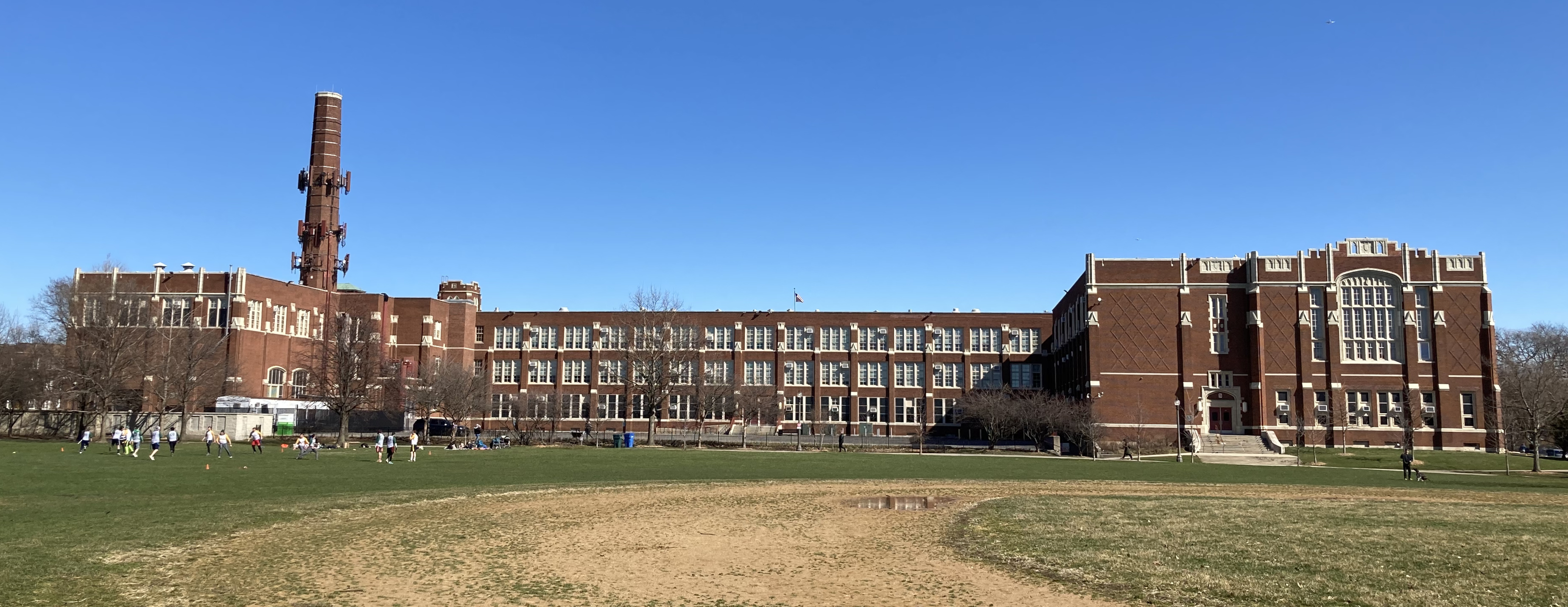
Amundsen High School, photographed in 2024

Amundsen High School and Chappell Elementary Schools are both located within the park. Chicago Park District measures the park to be 22.38 acres (9.06 ha).

Other facilities in the park include a field house, and miscellaneous sports fields. The park is used for many youth sports activities. In the mid-2020s, upgrades were made to the sports fields.

=== Stadium ===
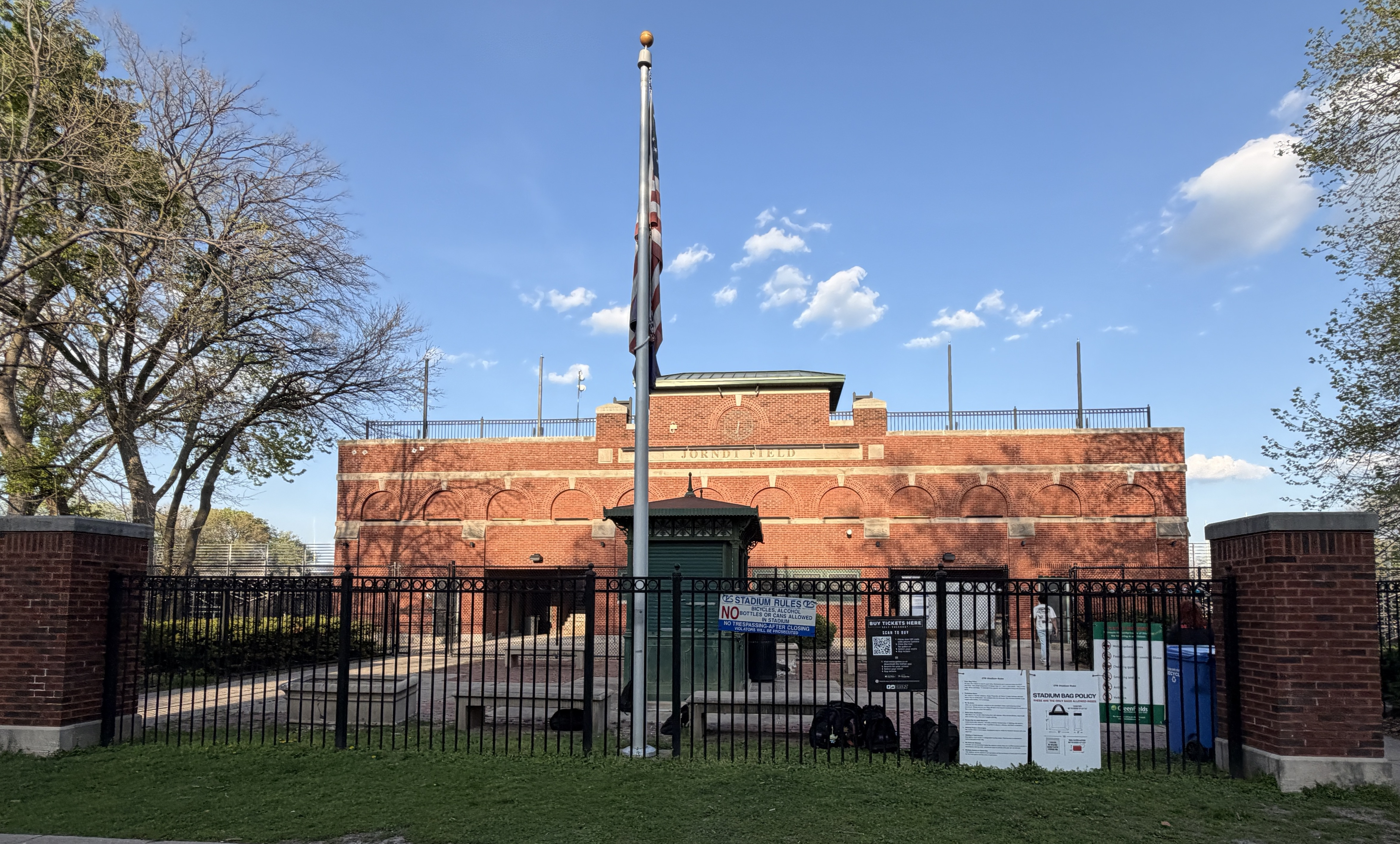
West grandstand of stadium, photographed in 2026

Located inside of the park is Winnemac Stadium, one of seven stadiums operated by Chicago Public Schools, which play host to Chicago Public League sporting events. As of 2022, it was holding approximately 1,000 games each year. Winnemac Stadium was constructed in the 1930s. Like the park, its takes its name from the Potawatomi chief name "Winamac".

Since 2004, its sports turf has been named "Jorndt Field", after teacher Louis C. Jorndt. The stadium's grandstand is brick-clad, and has a seating capacity of 4,500.

=== Prairie area ===
A portion of the park measuring 3 acres (1.2 ha), dubbed the "Winnemac Natural Area" "Winnemac Park Prairie", is planted with native prairie grasses and other prairie plants. This was first added during the park's 1999 renovation. Native prairie plant species in the natural area include the flowers rudbeckia hirta ("black-eyed susans") and symphyotrichum oolentangiense ("pale blue asters"). The natural area is divided into three separate sections, which are protected by split-rail fencing. It includes a woodchip trail. Commonly spotted species in the natural area include squirrels, butterflies, birds, with the latter two being attracted by its many flowering plants.

The natural area is tended to by volunteers. who care for it by removing invasive weeds, planting native species, and collecting seeds from the native plants, and removing litter. The opportunity to participate in this work is offered a beyond-classroom educational experience for students at adjacent schools.

== Independence Day celebrations ==
For many years, unsanctioned illegal fireworks displays were perennially launched at the park on the 4th of July to celebrate Independence Day. To discourage the continued launch of illegal fireworks at the park, in 2024 an officially-sanctioned fireworks-free celebration was launched at the park. The event proved popular with residents and returned the following year.
