= Mount Carmel High School (Chicago) =

Location
- 6410 S. Dante Ave. Chicago, Illinois 60637; United States; 41.778°N 87.5889°W

Information
- School type: Private
- Motto: Zelo Zelatus Sum Pro Domino Deo Exercituum (With zeal have I been zealous for the Lord God of Hosts)
- Religious affiliation: Roman Catholic
- Founded: 1900
- Status: Open
- Authority: Archdiocese of Chicago
- Oversight: Carmelites
- CEEB code: 141045
- President: Brendan Conroy
- Principal: Scott Tabernacki
- Staff: 84
- Grades: 9–12
- Gender: Male only
- Enrollment: 600
- Campus type: Urban
- Colors: Brown; White
- Slogan: You came to Carmel as a boy. If you care to struggle and work at it, you will leave as a man.
- Fight song: The Mount Carmel Fight Song
- Athletics conference: Chicago Catholic League
- Team name: Caravan
- Accreditation: North Central Association of Colleges and Schools
- Publication: Oasis
- Newspaper: The Caravan
- Yearbook: Oriflamme
- Tuition: US$13,100 (2021-22)
- Website: www.mchs.org

Mount Carmel High School is an all-boys Catholic high school in Chicago's Woodlawn neighborhood. Located in the Roman Catholic Archdiocese of Chicago, the school has been operated by the Carmelite order of priests and brothers since 1900. Several priests and brothers who teach at the school live in the nearby Saint Cyril Priory, though most of the staff consists of lay teachers.

Mount Carmel is occasionally confused with Carmel High School in Mundelein, Illinois, and Mount Carmel High School in Mount Carmel, Illinois. The former is also a Carmelite school, while the latter is the town of Mount Carmel's only public high school.

== History ==
In the Fall of 1900, the Carmelite order established St. Cyril College at 54th and Jefferson (now Harper) on Chicago's South Side. In the first year there were 13 students and five priest teachers. The following year the college was moved to 64th and Washington (now Blackstone) because of the need for a larger building and better access to public transportation. The St. Cyril College Building at 64th and Star (now Dante) was completed in 1902, and classes began with 137 students and 11 faculty members. The school was consecrated by Bishop Peter Muldoon on August 10, 1902; a delay caused by the death of Archbishop Patrick Feehan.

Upon opening the college had three departments: (1) Academic, which included both a junior high and a high school program; (2) College, a four-year program with emphasis on Greek and Latin; (3) Commercial, a three-year course.

In September 1910, the school hosted Vincenzo Cardinal Vannutelli, about ten years before becoming Dean of the College of Cardinals.

In 1918, with young men being called to serve in World War I, the college curriculum was dropped while the high school department was enlarged and improved. In December 1922, Father Elias Magennis, General of the Carmelite Order, and Archbishop Mundelein of Chicago agreed on the need for the immediate construction of a new St. Cyril High School Building. In the spring and summer of 1924, a three-story main building was erected by the Thompson-Starrett Construction Company with Zachary Davis (the "Frank Lloyd Wright of Baseball") as the architect. William Lynch, a St. Cyril College graduate, was in charge of construction. Later that fall, the new building was dedicated as Mount Carmel High School.

During World War II, Mt. Carmel began preparing students for wartime employment or military service, offering courses in aerodynamics, meteorology, navigation, and civil air regulations. Countless alumni from the Greatest Generation went on to serve in the United States Military.

In the 1960s and 70s, economic and sociological factors changed Mount Carmel's Woodlawn neighborhood- fewer Catholics were living in the immediate area and the school's enrollment dropped. Mount Carmel's close proximity to the Black Stone Rangers/Black P. Stones/El Rukn street gang may have also hurt their ability to maintain enrollment. Despite these conditions, improved bus routes permitted many students to continue reaching the school.

== Campus ==
The Mount Carmel campus is located at the intersection of East 64th Street and South Dante Avenue, near historic Jackson Park, Lake Michigan and the University of Chicago campus. The oldest surviving campus structures are the Carmelite Chapel and three-story main building from 1924, designed by legendary architect Zachary Taylor Davis.

In the early 1950s, Mt. Carmel built a Student Center on the north side of the main building. Then in 1968, a grant from the Archdiocese of Chicago's "Project: Renew" permitted the construction of a learning center and library that connected the main building to the student center. The campus would grow again to include Carey Field on the south end of school property.

Thanks to the Capital Campaign Case Study, the Walter Scott School property was acquired- and in 1992, construction began on a new monastery for the Carmelites. The Graham Center was then constructed on the site of the old Carmelite Monastery. Although the old Priory was demolished to make room for the science and computer center, the original Chapel was saved and given a facelift. In 1999, the Scott School property was used to build Haggerty Field for soccer and baseball. The campus again expanded in 2005 by adding the Mt. Carmel Convocation Center on the site of the old student parking lot. This addition is home to offices and meeting areas for alumni and faculty, a student commons/dining hall, new computer and science labs, and the Cacciatore Athletic Center. The athletic center features three gyms, an indoor track, locker rooms and a modern weight room. A new student parking lot was built on the north end of the campus.

Ongoing maintenance to existing facilities have included renovations to the original pool and Carey Field, which was converted to a multipurpose Sprint Turf playing surface. In the Fall of 2019, "Barda-Dowling Stadium" was added to Carey Field, with two permanent bleachers on the East end zone and South Sideline; the stadium also includes a press-box which houses the scoreboard, announcer, and the school's student broadcast team. The 'Old Gym' is still maintained to host athletic competition, including wrestling and the school's annual Fight Night boxing event. From 2016 to 2019, Mount Carmel has renovated the interior of the original school building, adding a more technology-friendly and modern school environment. The school also plans on renovating the student center into a fully functioning theater for the Drama Club and Band.

== Academics ==
Mount Carmel has been recognized as a Blue Ribbon and National Exemplary School, and offers four comprehensive programs of study to serve the needs of all college bound students: The Honors/Advanced Placement Program, Excel Program, College Preparatory Program, McDermott-Doyle Program for Developmental Learning.

*Renewable tuition reductions, or academic scholarships, are available to incoming freshmen based on their performance on the entrance exam.

== Athletics ==
Mount Carmel competes in the Chicago Catholic League (CCL). The school's forerunner, St. Cyril, was one of the eight founding members of the league in 1912, and Mount Carmel is one of five remaining charter members. Mount Carmel is a member of the Illinois High School Association (IHSA) and teams are stylized as the Caravan.

Mount Carmel sponsors interscholastic athletic teams in: baseball, basketball, bowling, cross country, football, golf, lacrosse, soccer, swimming & diving, tennis, track & field, volleyball, water polo, and wrestling. While not sponsored by the IHSA, the school also sponsors ice hockey and rugby.

The following teams have won their respective state championship tournament or meet:

- Baseball (IHSA 4A): 2012–13
- Basketball (IHSA AA): 1984–85
- Football (IHSA, multiple classes): 1980–81, 1988–89, 1989–90, 1990–91, 1991–92, 1996–97, 1998–99, 1999–2000, 2000–01, 2002–03, 2012–13, 2013–14, 2019–20, 2022–23, 2023–24, 2024-25, 2025-26
- Ice Hockey (AHAI) : 1979, 1986, 1987, 1988, 1990
- Wrestling: 1991–92 (2A), 1992–93 (2A), 1993–94 (2A), 2021–22 (3A), 2023–24 (3A)
- Water Polo (Illinois Water Polo): 1975

The football team’s 17 state championships are the most in state history, surpassing Joliet Catholic’s 15 state championships. They are also second all-time in wins (794) to East St. Louis Senior (821).

The football team is also credited with a record 15 Chicago Prep Bowl Championships in 1927, 1933, 1950, 1951, 1952, 1960, 1967, 1981, 1983, 1985, 1993, 2001, 2011, 2015, and 2016. The 1932 Prep Bowl was not played when the Public League champion refused to play; Mount Carmel claims this as a forfeit championship. The school also claims a Prep Bowl championship in 1939, a game that ended in a tie.

The Ice Hockey Club has amassed a Catholic League record 20 Kennedy Cup awards (1965, 1973, 1974, 1977, 1978, 1979, 1980, 1981, 1982, 1985, 1986, 1987, 1988, 1989, 1990, 1993, 1997, 1998, 1999, and 2000)

In 1908, the first ever basketball game played by DePaul University was a game against St. Cyril's on January 7, 1908.

In 1916, St. Cyril's and Hyde Park High School competed in the first ever dual boxing meet between Cook County schools. The tradition of boxing at Mt. Carmel continues to present day at the annual Fight Night in Spring.

In 1944, coach John Tracy led the Caravan basketball team to Chicago City Championship (Public vs Catholic Champion).

In 1985, coach Ed McQuillan led Mt. Carmel's basketball team to the IHSA's large class ("AA") state championship- the first won by a Parochial school. Future Los Angeles Laker Mel McCants and New York Giant Chris Calloway led the team to a 28-4 overall record, culminating in a victory over Springfield Lanphier at Assembly Hall in Champaign. James Farr scored 30 of the team's 46 points and Derek Boyd's buzzer beater in double overtime sealed the victory.

In 1995, Mt. Carmel's wrestling team was a heavy favorite to win its fourth consecutive state championship. After winning its regional tournament, the IHSA disqualified the team from further participation, claiming the team had violated the cap on tournament participation. Mt. Carmel filed suit in court, and a Cook County judge determined that the IHSA was following its rules arbitrarily, and ordered the Association to restore Mt. Carmel to the state tournament. An hour after the Illinois Supreme Court ruled on an IHSA appeal, and sided with Mt. Carmel, the IHSA suspended the dual team state tournament. The IHSA attempted to appeal to the original judge. When that failed, the tournament was cancelled.

In 2024, the varsity basketball team returned to the state finals, falling to DePaul in the 3A championship. The Caravan were led by Northwestern-bound Angelo Ciaravino's 24 points.

At least three former students have competed in the Olympic Games (Chris Chelios in Ice Hockey, Eric Pappas in Baseball, and Joe Williams in Wrestling).

=== Barda-Dowling Stadium at Carey Field ===
Barda-Dowling Stadium at Carey Field
- Address: 65th St. and Blackstone Ave. Chicago, Illinois; United States
- Capacity: 2,200
- Type: Stadium
- Current use: Football
- Public transit: ME and at 63rd Street (local stop) and 55th/56th/57th Street (all schedules); 6, 15, 28 (at Stoney Island & 65th Street); 63 (at 64th St. & Blackstone); 67, N5 (at 67th Street & Blackstone)

Construction
- Opened: 2019

Tenant
- Mount Carmel HS Caravan football (CCL), 2019–present

In 2019, the school opened an on-campus sports stadium: Barda-Dowling Stadium at Carey Field. The venue was funded by contributions from donors and alumni, and featured a scoreboard, press box, and bleachers with capacity for 2,200 spectators.

The 2019 season marked the first in the school's history in which its football team had played all of its home games at an on-campus facility. The previous year, temporary bleachers had been erected to allow four on-campus games. For decades prior, the team had played its home games at Gately Stadium, and prior to that, its home games were at Eckersall Stadium. One advantage the school cited in its football team playing its home games on-campus is that the school can select its game start times, as opposed to needing to schedule for the limited available slots at a shared facility.

== Notable alumni ==
=== Arts, sciences and letters ===
- James T. Farrell was an author of over 40 published works, including the Studs Lonigan trilogy.
- Jacob "Jake" Matijevic (1947–2012) led the NASA engineering team for the Mars Exploration Rovers (including the "Spirit", "Opportunity" and "Curiosity" rovers) and has several landmarks (including "Matijevic Hill" and "Jake Matijevic rock") named for him on the planet Mars.
- Richard Anthony Parker was an Egyptologist who studied the mortuary temple of Ramesses III, founded the Brown University Department of Egyptology and was selected as a Corresponding Fellow at the British Academy.

=== Athletics ===
- Tracy Abrams was an overseas professional basketball player after playing point guard for the Illinois Fighting Illini men's basketball team for parts of 6 seasons from 2011-2017.
- Elmer Angsman was an NFL running back (1946–52), playing his entire career for the Chicago Cardinals. Angsman holds the NFL postseason record for yards per carry (15.9), set in the 1947 NFL title game.
- Chris Calloway is a former NFL wide receiver (1990–2000), playing most of his career with the New York Giants.
- Cesar Carrillo was a Major League Baseball pitcher for the San Diego Padres.
- Chris Chelios is a former NHL defenseman (1983–2010) who won 3 Stanley Cups. He also played on four Olympic and two World Cup teams for the United States. His number 7 was retired by his hometown Chicago Blackhawks on February 25, 2024.
- Frank Cornish was an NFL offensive lineman (1990–95). He played for the World Champion Dallas Cowboys in Super Bowls XXVII and XXVIII.
- Matt Cushing is a former NFL fullback & tight end (1999–2005), playing his entire career with the Pittsburgh Steelers.
- Ziggy Czarobski was a defensive tackle with the Chicago Rockets of the All-America Football Conference (1948–49). He played for the University of Notre Dame in 1942, 46, and 47 and was inducted into the College Football Hall of Fame in 1977.
- Count Dante (John Timothy Keehan) was a martial arts champion and teacher.
- Steve Edwards is a former NFL offensive guard (2002–07).
- Glenn Foster (1990–2021) was a former NFL defensive end who played for the New Orleans Saints.
- Tony Furjanic is a former NFL linebacker (1986–88), playing most of his career with the Buffalo Bills.
- Dan Goich is a former professional American football player who played defensive lineman for five seasons for the Detroit Lions, New Orleans Saints, and New York Giants.[2]
- Bob Gonya was an American football offensive tackle who played in the National Football League. He played for two seasons with the Philadelphia Eagles from 1933–1934. He played college football at Northwestern.
- Darrell Hill is a former NFL wide receiver (2002–04), playing his entire career for the Kansas City Chiefs.
- Ed Howard is an American professional baseball shortstop in the Chicago Cubs organization. Howard was drafted 16th overall in the 2020 MLB Draft
- Mike Kerrigan is a former professional quarterback.
- Ross LaBauex was a professional soccer player for the Colorado Rapids of the MLS.
- Steve Lawson is a former professional American football guard in the National Football League. He played seven seasons for the Cincinnati Bengals (1971–1972), the Minnesota Vikings (1973–1975), and the San Francisco 49ers (1976–1977).
- Jordan Lynch is the school's current head football coach. He was a 2013 Heisman Trophy finalist and NCAA record-breaking quarterback for the Northern Illinois Huskies.
- John Mallee is a hitting coach for the Los Angeles Angels, and formerly the Chicago Cubs, Philadelphia Phillies, Florida Marlins and Houston Astros.
- Mel McCants is a former NBA forward who played for the Los Angeles Lakers (1989–90).
- Denny McLain is a former Major League Baseball pitcher (1963–72), playing most of his career with the Detroit Tigers. He was a two-time Cy Young Award winner, and won the AL MVP award in 1968. He was the last Major League pitcher to win 30 games in a season.
- Donovan McNabb is an ESPN Radio show host who was the second overall pick in the 1999 NFL draft by the Philadelphia Eagles. As a player, he was named to five NFL Pro Bowls.
- Nate Ollie is an American football defensive line coach for the Atlanta Falcons.
- Erik Pappas is a former Major League Baseball catcher (1991–94), playing major league games for both the St. Louis Cardinals and Chicago Cubs. He was also a member of the 2004 Greek baseball team which participated in the 2004 Summer Olympics.
- Simeon Rice is a former NFL defensive end (1996–2007). He was the third overall pick in the 1996 NFL draft, and is a member of the Super Bowl XXXVII Champion Tampa Bay Buccaneers Ring of Honor.
- Craig Robinson is an ESPN Analyst and former head men's basketball coach at Brown University and Oregon State University. He is the brother of former First Lady Michelle Obama.
- Mel Rojas Jr. is a Dominican-American professional baseball outfielder for the KT Wiz of the KBO League.
- Jack Stephens was a former NBA player for the St. Louis Hawks (1955–56).
- Ed Stewart is the Senior Associate Commissioner of Football for the Big 12 Conference. He was a consensus first team All-American linebacker for national champion Nebraska Cornhuskers in 1994.
- Alek Thomas is an American professional baseball outfielder for the Los Angeles Dodgers. He was drafted in the second round of the 2018 Major League Baseball draft. Played in 2023 WBC for Team Mexico.
- Nate Turner is a former NFL running back (1993–95), playing most of his career with the Buffalo Bills.
- Antoine Walker is a former NBA forward (1996–2008). He was a member of the 1996 National Champion Kentucky Wildcats and the 2006 NBA champion Miami Heat.
- Lloyd Walton was NBA guard (1977–81), playing most of his career with the Milwaukee Bucks. Walton was a second-team All-American for Al McGuire's 1975-76 Marquette Warriors, who finished the season ranked #2 in the A.P. poll.
- Joe Williams was a 4-time IHSA state champion wrestler. He also became a 3-time NCAA Champion, 6 time U.S. National Champion, and finished fifth at the 2004 Summer Olympics.
- Trevion Williams (born 2000), basketball player for Maccabi Tel Aviv of the Israeli Basketball Premier League
- Steven Wirtel is an American football long snapper who has been part of the Green Bay Packers, Los Angeles Rams and Detroit Lions organizations.

=== Performing arts ===
- Richard Kiley was a two-time Tony Award and three time Emmy Award winning actor of stage, film, and television. He originated the role of Don Quixote/Miguel de Cervantes in the Broadway premiere of Man of La Mancha.
- Tim O'Connor (1927–2018) was an American actor best known for his work on television (Elliot Carson on Peyton Place, Dr. Huer on Buck Rogers in the 25th Century).
- Daniel Sunjata (Dan Condon) is a film, stage and television actor; he was Tony Award-nominated for his performance in Take Me Out and perhaps best known for his major role as Franco Rivera on Rescue Me from 2004 - 2011.

=== Public and military service ===
- William Cunningham (Illinois politician) represents the 18th district in the Illinois State Senate.
- Tom Dart is the current Sheriff of Cook County (2006–present).
- Robert Peters represents the 13th district in the Illinois State Senate.
- Edward Derwinski was a United States representative for Illinois' 4th congressional district (1959–83). He served as the first U.S. Secretary of Veterans Affairs to hold cabinet level status (1989–92), doing so under United States President George H. W. Bush.
- Dan Duffy (1984) is an Illinois State Senator.
- Col. Steve dePyssler was the only American to serve in World War II, Korean War, First Indochina War, Bay of Pigs invasion and the Vietnam War.
- General John J. Hennessey (August 20, 1921 – March 20, 2001) was a United States Army Four-star general who served as Commander of the 101st Airborne during the Vietnam War.
- Edward Vrdolyak is a former Chicago Alderman and was President of the Chicago City Council (1977–1983).

== Notable staff ==
- Terry Brennan was the school's head football coach (1949–53). He later served as head football coach at the University of Notre Dame (1954–58).
- Wally Fromhart was the school's head football coach (1937–43, 46). He was later coach at the University of Detroit (1954–58).
- John Jordan was the school's basketball coach. He later became head coach at the University of Notre Dame (1951–64).
- Ray Lemek was an assistant football coach for one year between starring for the University of Notre Dame and being drafted in the 1956 NFL draft. He was an All-Pro NFL offensive lineman (1957–65).
- Frank Maloney was the school's head football coach (1963–68). He later was the head football coach at Syracuse University (1974–80).
- Ed Mieszkowski was a football coach at the school.
- Bill Weick is the school's former wrestling coach (1985–2003) and led the school to 3 consecutive IHSA state championships. He was an accomplished national and international wrestler who also served as a coach for Team USA at several international competitions, including several Olympic Games.
