= Jack Delveaux =

American gridiron football player (1937–2020)

Profile
- Positions: Fullback, Linebacker, Punter

Personal information
- Born: March 15, 1937; Chicago, Illinois, U.S.
- Died: May 13, 2020 (aged 83); Peachtree City, Georgia, U.S.
- Listed height: 6 ft 1 in (1.85 m)
- Listed weight: 220 lb (100 kg)

Career information
- NFL draft: 1959: 9th round, 107th overall pick

Career history
- 1959–1964: Winnipeg Blue Bombers

Awards and highlights
- 3× Grey Cup champion (1959, 1961, 1962)

John William Delveaux (March 15, 1937 – May 13, 2020) was an American professional football fullback and linebacker who played for the Winnipeg Blue Bombers from 1959 to 1964, a team which won the Grey Cup in 1959, 1961 and 1962.

Playing high school football at Fenger Academy High School, Delxeaux and his teammate Ron Nietupski were named the joint MVPs (most valuable players) of the 1954 Chicago Prep Bowl.

Delveaux played college football at the University of Illinois at Urbana–Champaign and was their team captain. He joined the Blue Bombers in 1959 and played both offense and defense. In the 1961 CFL season, he replaced an injured Charlie Shepard as the punter and did a commendable job in the team's Grey Cup victory. In 1962, he became their regular punter up to his final year, averaging 42.1 yards per punt over 5 years. As a linebacker, he intercepted 9 balls in his career, 4 of which in 1962, and recovered 4 fumbles. Delveaux died on May 13, 2020.
