= Winnemac Stadium =

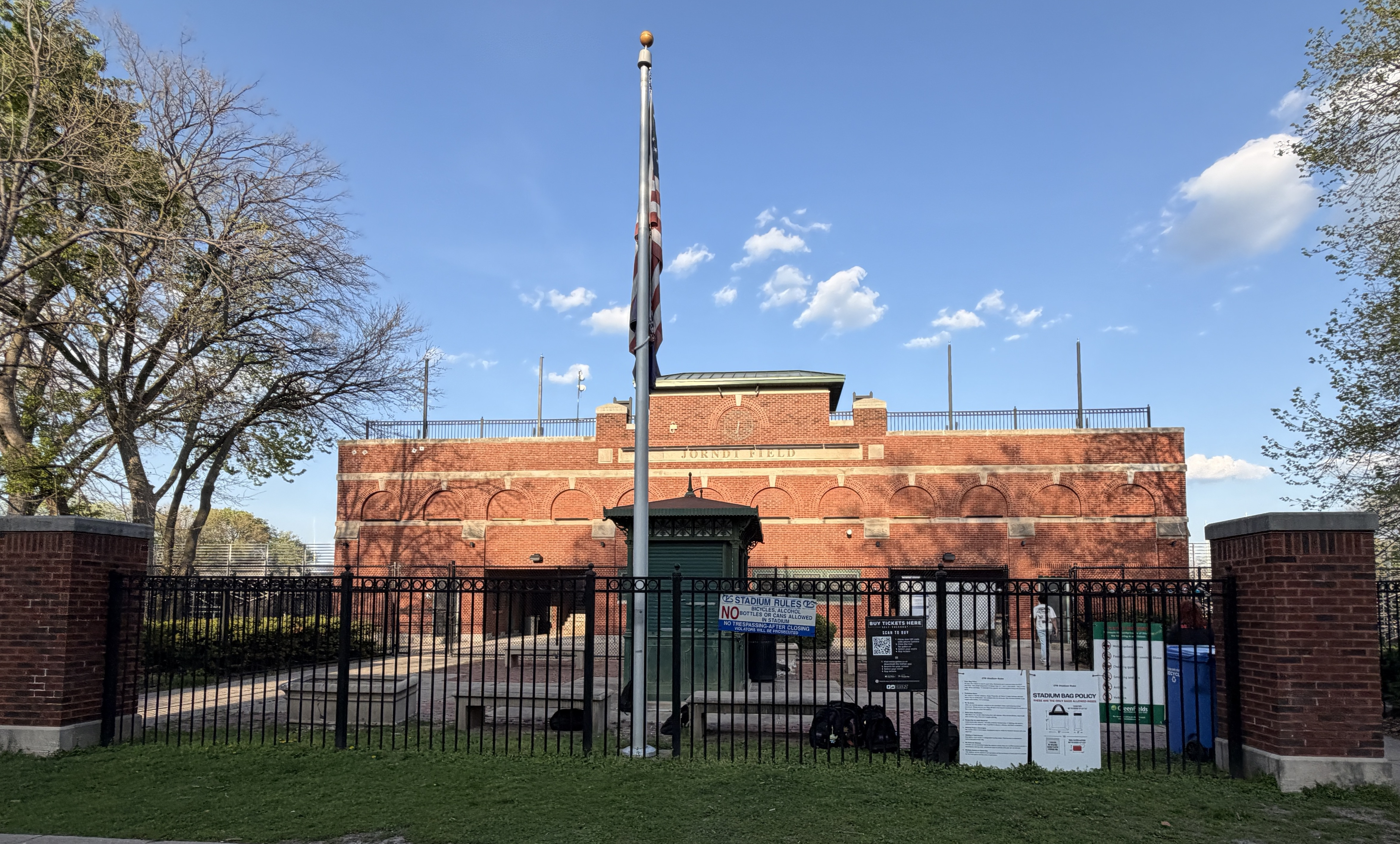
- West grandstand exterior as seen in 2026
- Full name: Jorndt Field at Winnemac Stadium
- Address: 5105 North Leavitt Street; Chicago, Illinois; United States
- Owner: Chicago Public Schools
- Operator: Chicago Public Schools
- Capacity: 4,500
- Type: Stadium
- Current use: American football Soccer; Rugby
- Public transit: Brown Damen and Western; 49, 49B, 50, 80, 92; UPN at Ravenswood

Construction
- Opened: 1930s
- Renovated: 2004

Tenant
- Chicago Public High School League; Chicago Stockyarders (rugby 7s); Edgewater Castle (USL League Two/ USL W League), 2026–present; Chicago Force (IWFL; WFA), formerly; Chicago Maroons (NAPSL), 1940s–1950s; Chicago Vikings (NAPSL), 1940s–1950s

Winnemac Stadium is a stadium located inside Winnemac Park in Chicago, Illinois. It is one of the seven stadiums operated by Chicago Public Schools, which play host to Chicago Public League sporting events. As of 2022, it was holding approximately 1,000 games each year. Winnemac Stadium was constructed in the 1930s. Like the park, it takes its name from the Potawatomi chief name "Winamac". Since 2004, its sports turf has been named "Jorndt Field", after teacher Louis C. Jorndt.

The stadium's grandstand is brick-clad, and has a seating capacity of 4,500.

== Overview ==
Many soccer teams have called the venue "home" over its history. In the 1940s and 1950s, the Chicago Maroons and Chicago Vikings of the North American Professional Soccer League were tenants of the stadium. Edgewater Castle FC of USL League Two and USL W League began playing their home games at the venue for their men's and women's teams' 2026 seasons.

The stadium was the venue for the finals of the 1956 National Challenge Cup (U.S. Open Cup). On July 11, 2005, the Croatian national U21 team played a friendly at the stadium against the Chicago Fire of the MLS.

In 1967, the venue was one of several Chicago stadiums used as a home venue by Chicago Circle Chikas football, with a game against Illinois State being played at the stadium.

The stadium was renovated in 2004 and renamed Jorndt Field after Louis C. Jorndt, who taught and coached at Amundsen High School (a high school located inside Winnemac Park) from 1930 until 1953. His son Dan and his wife Pat donated $1 million for the renovation.

Football scenes for the movie The Express: The Ernie Davis Story, a film about the life of Ernie Davis that was released in 2008.
