= Lane Stadium (Chicago) =

Sports venue in Chicago, Illinois

- exterior of stadium, photographed in 2024
- Full name: Fritz Pollard Field at Lane Stadium
- Address: 2601 West Addison Street; Chicago, Illinois; United States
- Owner: Chicago Public Schools
- Operator: Chicago Public Schools
- Capacity: 4,800
- Type: Stadium
- Surface: artificial turf
- Current use: Football, Soccer, Track and field
- Public transit: 49, 80, 93, 94, 152

Construction
- Opened: 1934
- Renovated: 1939–1941; 2007, 2015

Tenant
- Chicago Public League; DePaul Blue Demons track and field (NCAA Division I); Chicago Force (IWFL; WFA), former

Lane Stadium is a sports stadium on the campus of Lane Tech College Prep High School in Chicago, Illinois. It is one of seven stadiums operated by Chicago Public Schools that play host to Chicago Public League. It is also the home venue of the NCAA Division I track and field program of the DePaul Blue Demons.

== Overview ==
Lane stadium is one of seven stadiums operated by Chicago Public Schools, which play host to Chicago Public League sporting events. As of 2022, it was typically site of approximately 1,000 games each year.

The stadium is located on the campus of Lane Tech High School, and seats 4,800 spectators. Since 2020, the playing turf at the stadium has been named "Fritz Pollard Field at Lane Stadium". Pollard was an alumnus of Lane Tech. Architect Paul Gerhardt Jr.'s original plan for the school campus (which was ultimately downscaled) included two sports stadiums.

The athletic field was opened in 1934, the same year that the adjacent school building was opened. Its collegiate gothic grandstand was constructed between 1939 and 1941 by the WPA. The venue was renovated in 2007 and 2015.

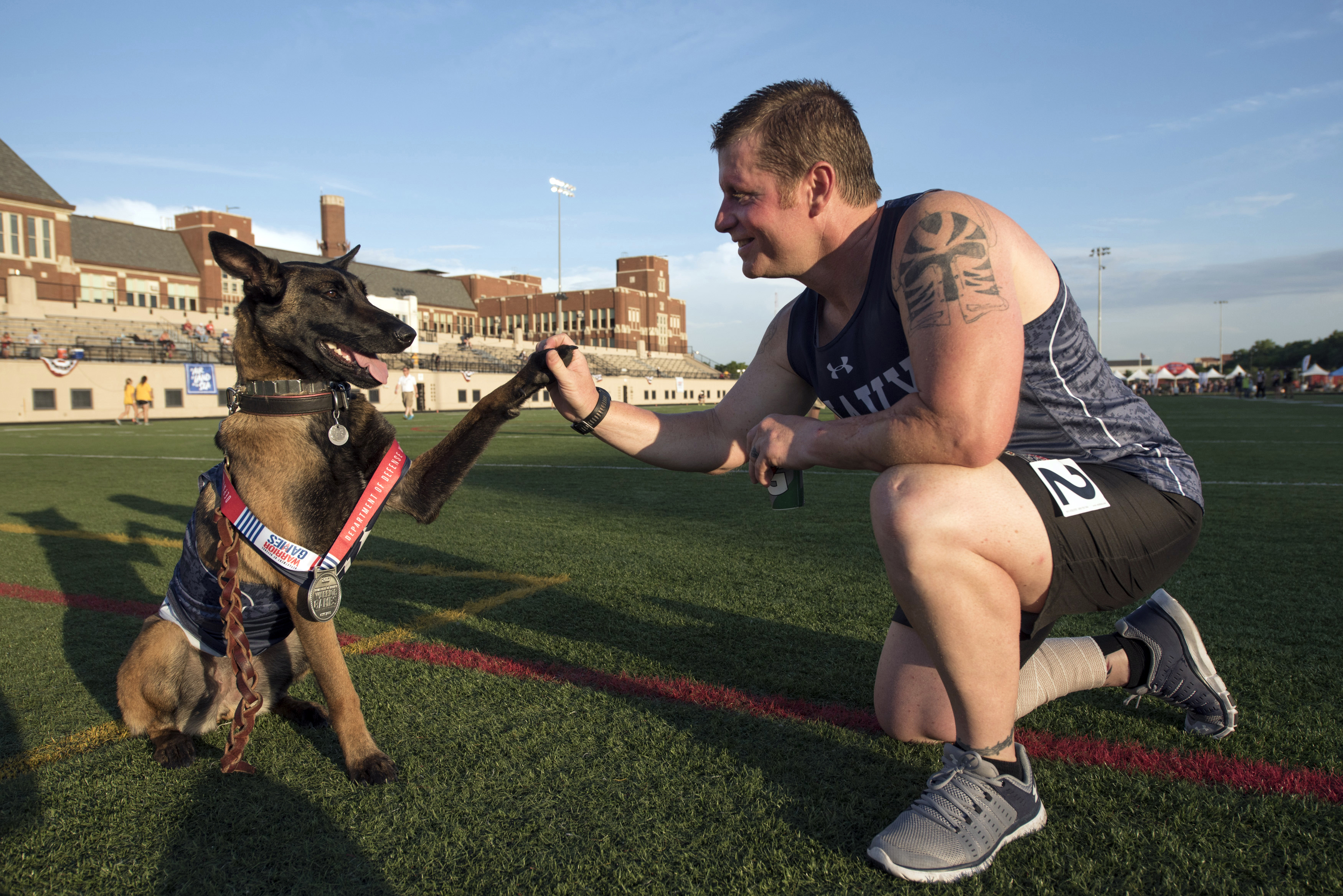
a competitor and a service dog pose after competitions at Lane Stadium during the 2017 Warrior Games

In addition to Chicago Public League sports, the stadium is the home venue of the DePaul Blue Demons collegiate track and field program (NCAA Division I). The stadium was the site of track and field competition during the 2017 Warrior Games, held in Chicago.

The stadium was used as a filming location for the movie The Express: The Ernie Davis Story, released in 2008. It was used as a stand-in for Syracuse Orange football's practice field.

== Renovations ==
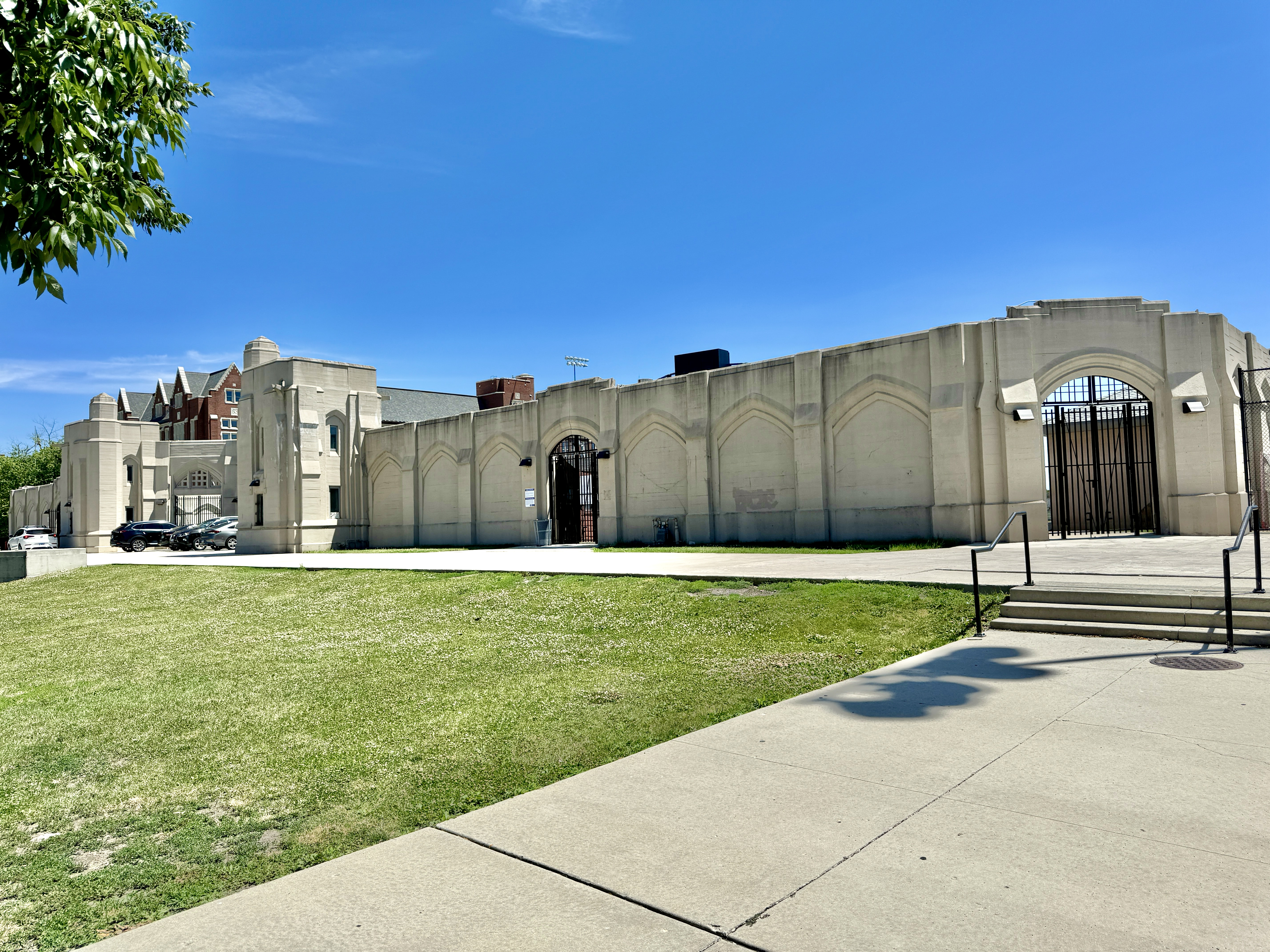
exterior of stadium, photographed in 2024

During the spring 2007 season, Chicago city building inspectors declared Lane Stadium unsafe and condemned the eastern half of the stadium. The age of the stadium and the fact it was built on landfill raised concerns that using the stadium to full capacity would cause a structural collapse. Events affected were the 2007–2014 graduating class ceremonies (moved to the UIC Pavilion located at the University of Illinois at Chicago), the annual Letterman versus Faculty Softball game, the annual Memorial Day assembly, and the 2007, 2008, and 2009 Pep Rally. Lane Stadium reopened September 7, 2007, with a new artificial turf field.

The stadium was again renovated in 2015. This renovation included the resurfacing the playing field with a new artificial turf and upgrading of the stadium's track and field components to NCAA standards.
