= Glenn Foster =

American football player (1990–2021)

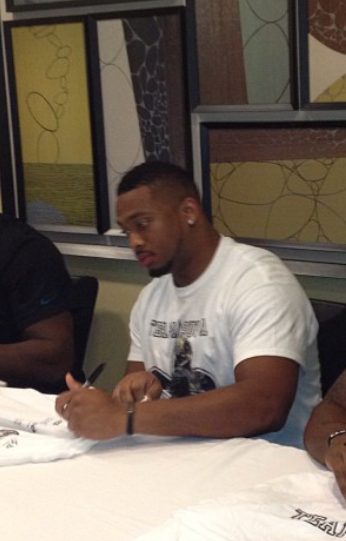
- Foster in 2013

No. 74, 97
- Position: Defensive end

Personal information
- Born: May 31, 1990; Chicago, Illinois, U.S.
- Died: December 6, 2021 (aged 31); Northport, Alabama, U.S.
- Listed height: 6 ft 4 in (1.93 m)
- Listed weight: 285 lb (129 kg)

Career information
- High school: Mount Carmel (Chicago, Illinois)
- College: Illinois
- NFL draft: 2013: undrafted

Career history
- New Orleans Saints (2013–2014)

Career NFL statistics
- Total tackles: 8
- Sacks: 3
- Pass deflections: 1
- Stats at Pro Football Reference

Glenn Foster Jr. (May 31, 1990 – December 6, 2021) was an American professional football player who was a defensive end in the National Football League (NFL). He played college football for the Illinois Fighting Illini.

== Professional career ==
On April 28, 2013, he signed with the New Orleans Saints as an undrafted free agent.

On August 6, 2015, he was waived by the Saints.

== Personal life and death ==
Foster attended Mount Carmel High School in Chicago, where he started playing football only as a sophomore. Retired from the NFL in 2016, since then he has been focusing on his efforts in real estate development and sales, together with his wife Pamela (who earned her own general contractor's license in 2014).

On December 6, 2021, Foster died shortly after being put into custody by police in Pickens County, Alabama. His cause of death is under investigation. An unofficial autopsy showed evidence of "neck compressions and strangulation".

The family of Foster has filed a lawsuit against Carriage Services Inc., the Louisiana funeral home that has been hired to handle his remains. The funeral home is alleged to have improperly handled his remains and to have destroyed his brain without authorization or consent by the family; his family had wanted to have Foster’s brain examined for signs of chronic traumatic encephalopathy. They are being represented by Benjamin Crump and Kenneth Abbarno.
