= Weber High School (Chicago) =

Archbishop Weber High School
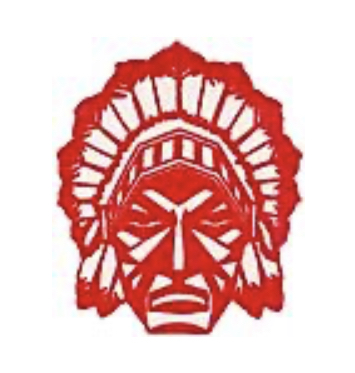
- Weber High School Mascot (1890–1999)

Location
- 5252 West Palmer, Chicago Illinois; United States; 41.9208°N 87.7579°W

Information
- Former name: St. Stanislaus College to 1930
- Religious affiliation: Roman Catholic
- Patron saint: Józef Weber
- Established: 1890
- Founder: Congregation of the Resurrection
- Status: Closed
- Closed: June 1999
- Grades: Freshman, sophomore, junior, senior
- Gender: Boys' school
- Enrollment: 1,200 in 1960
- Language: English
- Campus type: City
- Colors: Red and white
- Fight song: Weber Red Horde Fight Song
- Mascot: Red Horde
- Yearbook: Dolphin

Archbishop Weber High School was a U.S. Roman Catholic all-boys' high school in northwest Chicago, Illinois. Founded in September 1890 as St. Stanislaus College by Rev. Vincent Barzyński, it was the first Polish secondary school in Chicago. It was within the Roman Catholic Archdiocese of Chicago.

== History ==
In the 1960s, the school had about 1,200 students. The U.S. Department of Education recognized Weber as a "National Exemplary School" in 1990. In the 1990s, the tuition fees increased and the student population declined by 100 on an annual basis until its final school year, 1998–1999, when it had 250 students and an annual tuition of $4,700 ($9,083.6 when considering inflation). Weber High School closed in June 1999.

The heritage of Weber is kept alive through the Weber High School Alumni Association. Alumni records are held in the Archdiocese of Chicago's Records Office.

== Notable alumni ==
- Mike Krzyzewski (born 1947), former head men's basketball coach at Duke University
- Bill Skowron (born 1930, died 2012), American professional baseball first baseman. He was an eight-time All-Star and a five-time World Series champion, one of just six players in MLB history to have won back-to-back Series championships on different teams.
