= Gately Park =

Park in Chicago, Illinois, United States

Coordinates: 41.709°N 87.604°W

- Location: 10201 South Cottage Grove Avenue Chicago, IL, Chicago, Illinois
- Area: 22.78 acres (9.22 ha)
- Established: 1947
- Owner: Chicago Park District
- Public transit: ME at 103rd Street/Rosemoor; 4, 34, 106, 115
- Website: https://www.chicagoparkdistrict.com/parks-facilities/gately-james-park

Gately Park is a public park in the Pullman neighborhood of Chicago.

== History ==
The park was built in 1947 on land previously owned by the Pullman Car Company. It was established in aims of serving the growing residential population of the area, which was expanding in the years following the World War II. It was created as part of a ten year post-war plan by the Chicago Park District to add new parks to underserved neighborhoods.

Further improvements to the new park began in 1950, ultimately including a sports stadium, locker rooms, and a structure housing offices. In 1953, the park was named for businessman James H. Gately, the then-incumbent president of the Chicago Park District Board of Commissioners. Gately himself had voted against the name change, which went against the park district's tradition of avoiding naming parks after living people.

== Gately Stadium ==
Gately Stadium
- Address: 810 East 103rd Street; Chicago, Illinois; United States
- Operator: Chicago Public Schools
- Capacity: 5,000
- Type: Stadium
- Current use: Football, Soccer
- Public transit: ME at 103rd Street/Rosemoor; 4, 34, 106, 115

Construction
- Opened: 1955
- Renovated: 2011

Tenant
- Chicago Public League, 1955–present; Mount Carmel HS Caravan football (CCL), formerly; Chicago Circle Chikas football (NAIA), 1965–1967

Inside the park is Gately Stadium, one of seven stadiums operated by Chicago Public Schools, which play host to Chicago Public League sporting events. As of 2022, it hosted approximately 1,000 games each year.

The stadium was first opened in 1955. It was renovated in 2011 with funding donated by the Chicago Bears, and seats 5,000 spectators. It is the largest high school football stadium on the South Side of Chicago.

Immediately after opening, the stadium began seeing use by American football teams of the Chicago Public League and Chicago Catholic League.

In 1959, a temporary outdoor velodrome was erected at the stadium to host the track cycling competition of the 1959 Pan American Games.

For decades, Mount Carmel High School of the Chicago Catholic League played its football games at the stadium. Before playing at Gately Stadium, they had played at Winnemac Stadium. Their use of Gately Stadium ended in 2019, when the team began playing at a new on-campus stadium.

== Dr. Conrad Worrill Track & Field Center ==
The park is home to the Dr. Conrad Worrill Track & Field Center at Gately Park. In August 2018, ground was broken at the park to construct the facility, which is the city's first indoor public facility dedicated to the sport of track and field. The facility is 139,000 square feet (12,900 m^{2}), and features a 8-lane hydraulically-banked track. It is the first hydraulically-banked 200-meter track in the region.

The facility has seating for 3,500 spectators, and has hosted NCAA Division I track competitions (including the Blue Demon Alumni Classic).

The facility is also used as a local youth and high school training facility for various other sports.

The building and adjacent fieldhouse also includes space used by After School Matters, which established programs in its space at the park in 2021.

== Other facilities ==
The park also features a fieldhouse/"clubhouse", which is used for various youth programs. Wendell Park Elementary School is located inside of the field house.

The park also features baseball and softball diamonds, a playground, and outdoor basketball courts.
