= Amundsen High School =

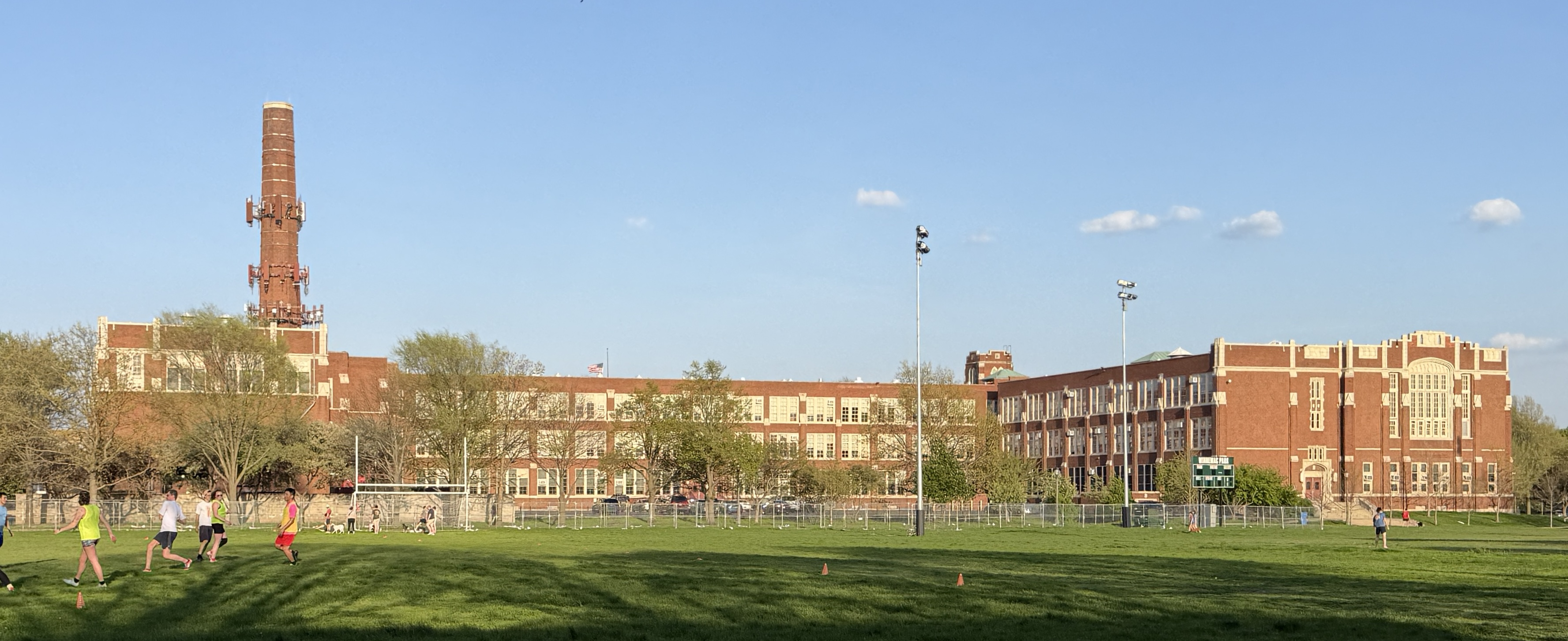

Location
- 5110 North Damen Avenue; Chicago, Illinois 60625; United States; 41.9751°N 87.6803°W

Information
- School type: Public; Secondary
- Motto: Accountable, Honorable, Scholarly
- Opened: 1929
- School district: Chicago Public Schools
- CEEB code: 140655
- Principal: Kristi M. Eilers
- Grades: 9–12
- Gender: Coed
- Enrollment: 1,437 (2025–2026)
- Campus type: Urban
- Colors: Red; Grey
- Athletics conference: Chicago Public League
- Team name: Vikings
- Accreditation: North Central Association of Colleges and Schools
- Yearbook: The Viking
- Website: amundsenhs.org

Roald Amundsen High School is a public 4–year high school located between the Ravenswood, Andersonville and Lincoln Square neighborhoods in Chicago, Illinois, United States. Opened in 1929, Amundsen is a part of Chicago Public Schools district. The school is named for Norwegian explorer Roald Amundsen (1872–1928). In 2015, the school achieved "Level 1 Status in Good Standing" under the district's performance policy rating. The school is located in Winnemac Park, and shares a part of its campus with another Chicago public school, Eliza Chappell Elementary School.

== History ==
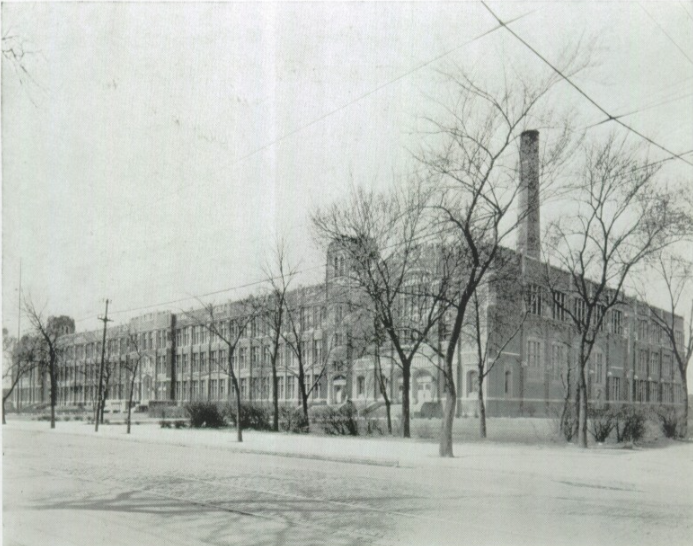
The school seen in the 1934 The Viking yearbook.

The school was named after Roald Amundsen, the Norwegian explorer who led the first expedition to reach the South Pole. His expedition reached the pole on December 14, 1911. Designed by architect Paul Gerhardt, Roald Amundsen School opened on November 10, 1930, two years after the explorer died in a rescue mission to the North Pole. Amundsen was not a high school when it opened, but a junior high. The Amundsen building also played host to branches of other schools, including a branch of McPherson Elementary that opened in Amundsen in 1932.

On July 26, 1933, Amundsen Junior High became Amundsen Senior High. In addition to serving high school pupils it also accommodated an elementary school unit. In June 1935 the Amundsen Elementary unit closed except for a small number of first and second-graders kept on as a branch of Goudy Elementary. This branch of Goudy in Amundsen became a branch of Hamilton on January 8, 1936, and remained until 1937 when it was rendered obsolete by the newly erected Chappell School. In 1956, the school was the first site of a two-year college program that later grew to become present-day Harry S Truman College. Above the main entrance is inscribed the quote, "A brave man may fall but cannot yield."

== Academics ==
As of the 2023–2024 school year, the school is ranked #3,329 in National Rankings on the U.S. News & World Report, with an overall score of 81.14.

=== Curriculum ===
The school offers the IB (International Baccalaureate) program, a nonprofit based in Switzerland known for its rigorous curriculum. The school has been authorized to give the Diploma program since 1999, and the Middle Years program since 2003. As of the 2022–2023 school year, 25% of students have taken an IB Exam, with a 24% passing rate. The school also offers AP (Advanced Placement) and DC (Dual Credit) programs.

== Athletics ==
Amundsen competes in the Chicago Public League (CPL) and is a member of the Illinois High School Association (IHSA). The schools sport teams are nicknamed Vikings. The boys' soccer team were public league champions five times (1984–1985, 1987–1988, 1998–1999, 1999–2000, 2001–2002), Class AA three times (1998–1999, 1999–2000, 2001–2002) and regional champions four times (2008–2009, 2011–2012, 2013–2014, 2016–2017). The Amundsen Girls Soccer team won the CPL Girls Soccer Championship Final in 1997–1998 and were regional champions two times (2008–2009, 2010–2011).

== Enrollment and demographics ==
Student Demographics (2025-2026)
1. Hispanic or Latino (36.0%)
2. Non-Hispanic White (45.0%)
3. Black or African-American (6.54%)
4. Asian (7.24%)
5. Multiracial (5.15%)
6. Native American or Pacific Islander (0.14%)

In the 2022–2023 school year, the school had 1,577 students. 43% of students were Hispanic or Latino, 36% were non-Hispanic white, 8% were black or African-American, 7% were Asian, 5% were multiracial, and <1% were Native American or Pacific Islander. 49.8% of students are eligible for free or reduced price lunch, and the school has a student to teacher ratio of 16.1.

== Notable alumni ==
- Bob Fosse, nine–time Tony Award-winning theatrical director and choreographer; won an Academy Award for directing the film Cabaret
- L. Daniel Jorndt, former Walgreens CEO (retired)
- Don Koehler, one of 17 known people in medical history to reach a height of 8 feet (2.44 m) or more
- Michael Mann, film writer, director, and producer (Heat, Ali, The Aviator, The Insider, Public Enemies)
- Haris Mujezinović, former Bosnia & Herzegovina national team player and Euroleague basketball player
- Wally Osterkorn, former professional basketball player; played for the 1948-49 Illinois Fighting Illini men's basketball team that reached the NCAA tournament's Final Four
- Don Rehfeldt, two-time Big Ten scoring champion for Wisconsin; professional basketball player
- Roy Thinnes, television and film actor (The Invaders, The Long, Hot Summer, Falcon Crest)
- Tony Yalda, film actor (American Dreams, Meet the Spartans); lead singer of The Hollabacks
