= Warrior Games =

American sporting event for wounded service personnel and veterans

- Purpose: To conduct multi-sport events for sports and disciplines that are contested in the Olympic Games (+ more sports) but for masters, injured or ill service personnel and veterans
- Frequency: Annual
- Inaugurated: 2010
- Most recent: 2024
- Website: http://www.dodwarriorgames.com/

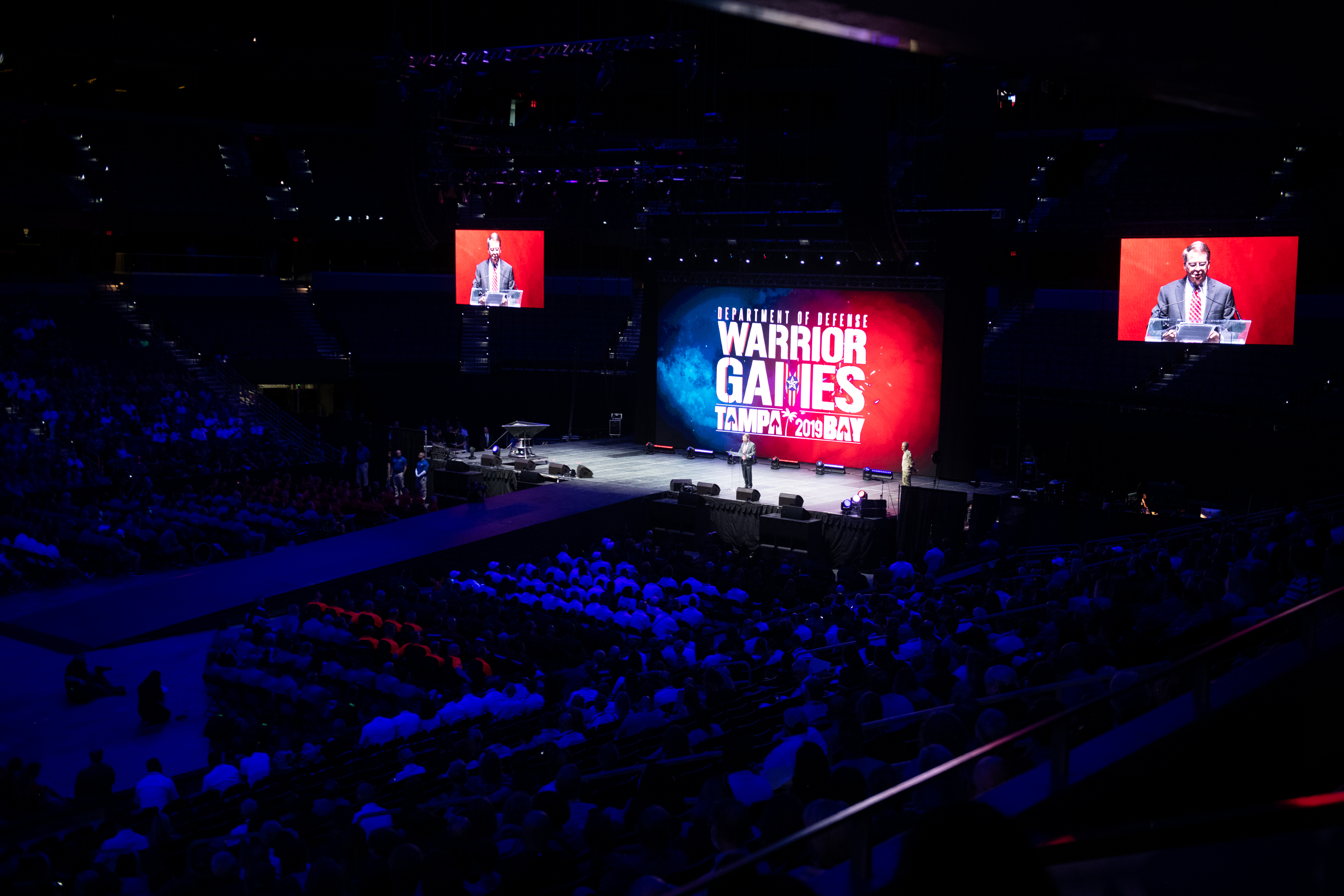
2019 opening ceremony

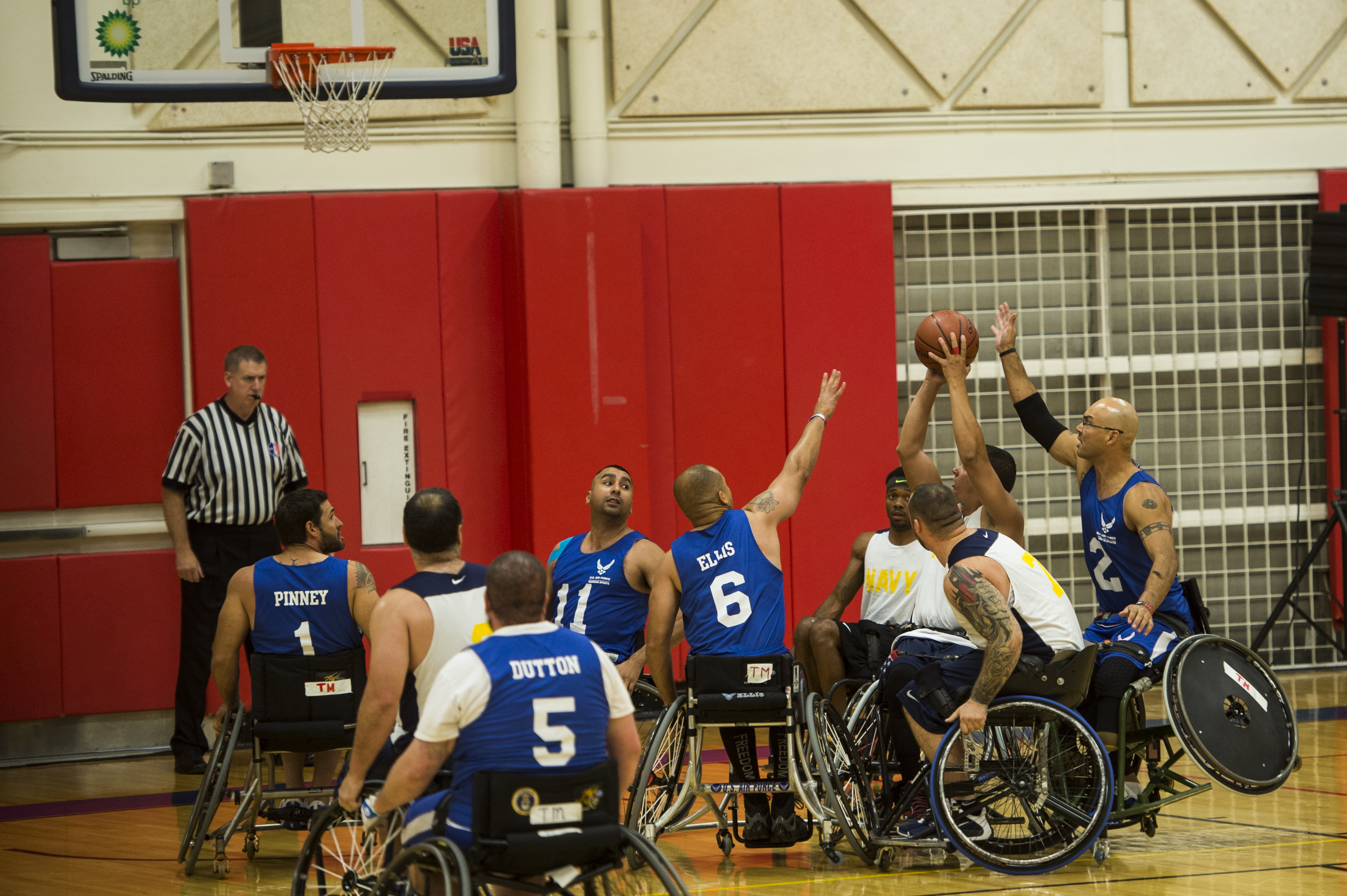
Wheelchair basketball at the 2014 games

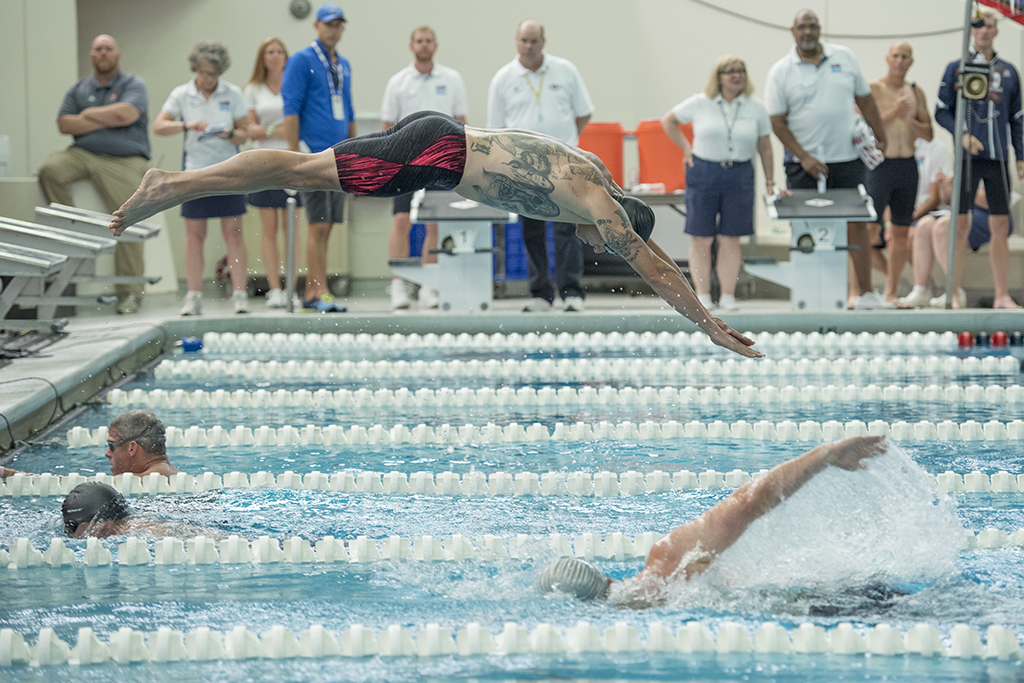
Swimming at the 2017 games

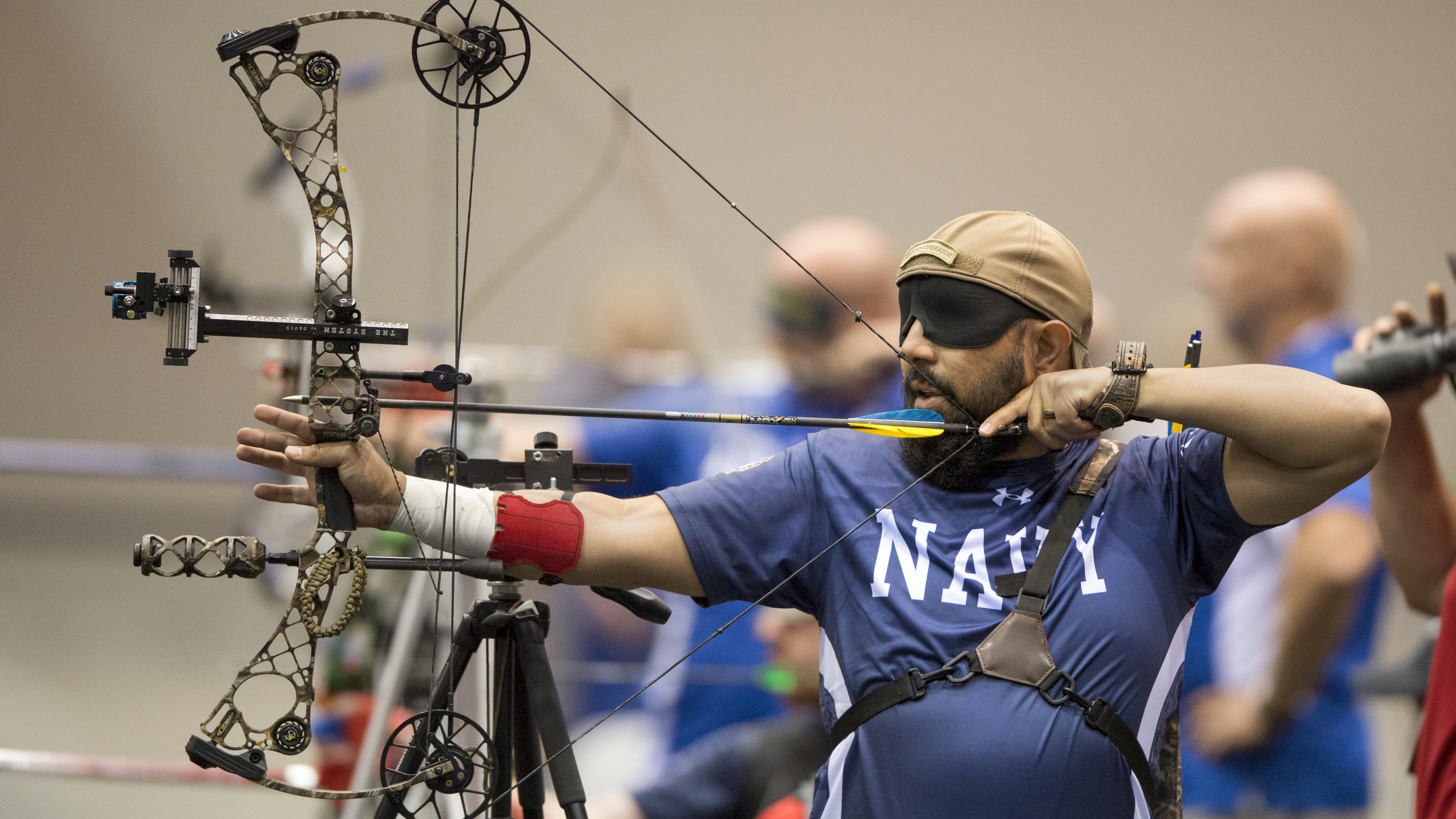
Archery at the 2017 games

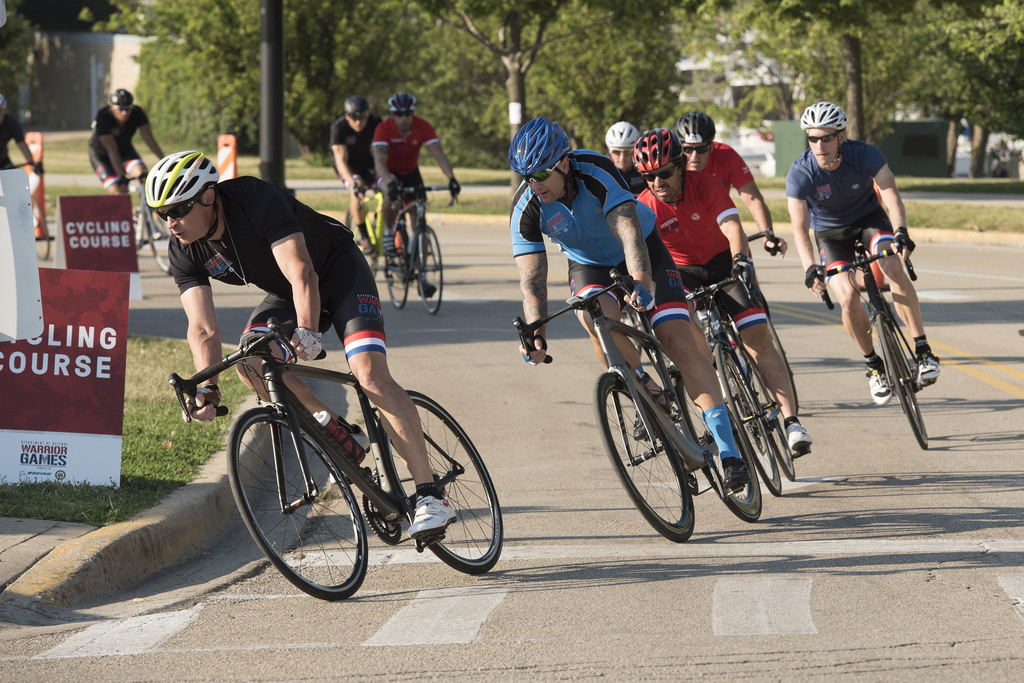
Cycling at the 2017 games

The Warrior Games is a multi-sport event for wounded, injured or ill service personnel and veterans organized by the United States Department of Defense.

== History ==
=== 2010–2014 ===
The Warrior Games have taken place annually since 2010 except during the COVID-19 pandemic of 2020–2021. It was created by John Wordin working with Gen. Gary Cheek (U.S. Army) while participating in the Ride 2 Recovery 2009 Texas Challenge. Subsequently, a meeting was held at the Pentagon with USO (Sloan Gibson, Kevin Wensing, Jeff Hill) Gen Cheek, Gen. David Blackledge and Sgt. James Shriver. Soon USMC Col. Greg Boyle and the United States Olympic Committee got involved too. As noted in Congressional reports, the first Warrior Games were funded by the Office of Wounded Warrior Care and Transition Policy in 2010. "To help them prepare for competition, warrior athletes receive specialized coaching in the sports of track and field, swimming, sitting volleyball, wheelchair basketball, archery, shooting, and cycling through camps and clinics funded by the Office of Warrior Care Policy." More than 200 Active Duty and Veteran athletes are selected from a field of hopefuls during joint-Service trials held by the Department each year. The first event was hosted at the U.S. Olympic and Paralympic Training Center in Colorado Springs, Colorado, which continued to host the event through to 2014. Teams from the Army, Marine Corps, Navy/Coast Guard, Air Force, Special Operations Command took part, competing in adaptive sports events that allow each athlete to compete regardless of their disability.

Athletes from the British Armed Forces took part in 2013, the first allied nation to join the event. Britain's Prince Harry, at the time serving as a captain and helicopter pilot in the British Army, opened the Games that year. His experience inspired him to create the Invictus Games, an international counterpart to the Warrior Games with representation from many national teams.

=== 2015–2016 ===
The 2015 event was the first organized by the Department of Defense. It was held June 19 to 28 at the Marine Corps Base Quantico in Virginia. Teams competed in eight adaptive sports.

In 2016, the event took place on June 15–21 at the United States Military Academy in West Point, New York. It was hosted by the United States Army as the first on a rotational basis with the Navy, Air Force, Special Operations Command. Jon Stewart emceed the ceremonies.

=== 2017 ===
In 2017, the event took place in Chicago and was hosted by the United States Navy. Chicago was chosen by the Navy over seven other potential sites in the United States. It was the first time that the games were held off a military base or U.S. Olympic training facility. Sponsors of the games included Boeing, Fisher House, the Pritzker Military Museum & Library, United Airlines, the Bob Woodruff Foundation, and many other companies.

Jon Stewart emceed the opening ceremony followed by a concert by Kelly Clarkson and Blake Shelton. The attendance at the opening ceremony, which included a video message from Chicago Mayor Rahm Emanuel, was roughly 10,000. Blues artist Sam Moore sang God Bless America and Soul Man.

In addition to teams representing all branches of the United States armed forces, Australia and the United Kingdom participated.

Leticia L. Vega, a Marine sergeant on the Special Operations Command team, took a medal in each event in which she competed.

The United States Navy team beat the United States Army team in the finals for sitting volleyball.

The United States Army team beat the United States Navy team in the finals for wheelchair basketball.

=== 2018–2019 ===
The Air Force hosted the 2018 Warrior Games at the United States Air Force Academy in June 2018. Sponsors of the games include Green Beans Coffee, Fisher House, Amazon, Under Armour, Dove among other companies.

Organized by the U.S. Special Operations Command, the 2019 games hosted in Tampa, Florida broke records in attendance and the number of featured sports.

=== 2022 ===
The Army hosted the games for the second time in 2022 following a breakdown due to the COVID-19 pandemic. The event was held at the ESPN Wide World of Sports Complex Walt Disney World, Florida, with nearly 300 athletes attending. The Canadian Armed Forces participated for the second time, following a training camp in Edmonton from July 11 to 15. The Armed Forces of Ukraine participated for the first time, after a month-long training program in the United Kingdom at RAF Brize Norton before traveling to the games. The Ukraine team won a number of medals at the games.

=== 2023 ===
The Warrior Games Challenge was hosted by the Army on Naval Station North Island in San Diego.

=== 2024 ===
For the 2024 Department of Defense Warrior Games, the U.S. Army Training & Doctrine Command hosted the event. The ESPN Wide World of Sports Complex at Walt Disney World Resort in Florida was the venue,returning to the same spot where it was held in 2022. Athletes participate to help them with their recovery, recovering from illness, wounds, or injuries, with more than 200 of them who participated in the adaptive sports at the 2024 games. The military teams that were represented at the games were the United States Navy, Marine Corps, Army, Special Operations Command, and Air Force, along with Australia’s Defence Force.

=== Family Program ===
The Warrior Games Family Program, led by the Fisher House Foundation, has supported the athletes and their families since 2012.

== Sports ==
In 2015 and 2016, the eight sports included were:

- Archery
- Cycling
- Field: Events included men's and women's shot put, standing shot put, seated discus, and standing discus.
- Shooting
- Sitting volleyball
- Swimming: Events included men's and women's 50 meter freestyle, 100 meter freestyle, 50 meter backstroke, and 50 meter breaststroke.
- Track: Events included 100 meters, 200 meters, 400 meters, 800 meters, and 1500 meters. There were events for athletes using wheelchairs and those using prosthetics.
- Wheelchair basketball

In 2015, wheelchair rugby was held as an exhibition sport.

In 2019, there were 14 sports: archery, cycling, time-trial cycling, shooting, sitting volleyball, swimming, track, field, wheelchair basketball, indoor rowing, powerlifting, golf, wheelchair tennis and wheelchair rugby.

Athletes competed in 12 sports in 2022: archery, cycling, field, golf, indoor rowing, powerlifting, shooting, sitting volleyball, swimming, track, wheelchair basketball, wheelchair rugby.

== List of Warrior Games ==
Year	Dates	Location	Participants	Host	Participating Teams	Ref.
2010	May 10–14	Colorado Springs, Colorado	200	United States Olympic Committee	United States Armed Forces: Army; Marine Corps; Navy/Coast Guard; Air Force; Special Operations Command	
2011	May 16–21	Colorado Springs, Colorado	200+	United States Olympic Committee	United States Armed Forces: Army; Marine Corps; Navy/Coast Guard; Air Force; Special Operations Command	
2012	April 30–May 5	Colorado Springs, Colorado	200+	United States Olympic Committee	United States Armed Forces: Army; Marine Corps; Navy/Coast Guard; Air Force; Special Operations Command	
2013	May 11–16	Colorado Springs, Colorado	200+	United States Olympic Committee	United States Armed Forces: Army; Marine Corps; Navy/Coast Guard; Air Force; Special Operations Command; (United Kingdom) British Armed Forces	
2014	September 28–October 4	Colorado Springs, Colorado	200+	United States Olympic Committee	United States Armed Forces: Army; Marine Corps; Navy/Coast Guard; Air Force; Special Operations Command; (United Kingdom) British Armed Forces	
2015	June 19–28	Quantico, Virginia	250	United States Department of Defense	United States Armed Forces: Army; Marine Corps; Navy/Coast Guard; Air Force; Special Operations Command; (United Kingdom) British Armed Forces	
2016	June 15–22	West Point, New York	250	United States Army	United States Armed Forces: Army; Marine Corps; Navy/Coast Guard; Air Force; Special Operations Command; (United Kingdom) British Armed Forces	
2017	July 1–9	Chicago, Illinois	265	United States Navy	United States Armed Forces: Army; Marine Corps; Navy/Coast Guard; Air Force; Special Operations Command; (Australia) Australian Defence Forces (United Kingdom) British Armed Forces	
2018	June 2–9	Air Force Academy, Colorado	265	United States Air Force	United States Armed Forces: Army; Marine Corps; Navy/Coast Guard; Air Force; Special Operations Command; (Australia) Australian Defence Forces (United Kingdom) British Armed Forces	
2019	June 21–30	Tampa, Florida		U.S. Special Operations Command	United States Armed Forces: Army; Marine Corps; Navy/Coast Guard; Air Force; Special Operations Command; (Australia) Australian Defence Forces (United Kingdom) British Armed Forces (Canada) Canadian Armed Forces (Denmark) Danish Defence Netherlands Armed Forces	
2022	August 19–28	Orlando, Florida	Nearly 300	United States Army	United States Armed Forces: Army; Marine Corps; Navy/Coast Guard; Air Force; Special Operations Command; (Canada) Canadian Armed Forces Armed Forces of Ukraine	
2023		San Diego, California				
2024		Orlando, Florida				
2025	July 18-26	Colorado Springs, Colorado				
2026	July 13-20	San Antonio, Texas				
