= United Soccer League of Pennsylvania =

Soccer league in Pennsylvania, U.S.

- Founded: 1959
- First season: 1959-1960 season
- Country: United States
- Confederation: CONCACAF
- Divisions: 4
- Number of clubs: 26
- Domestic cup(s): U.S. National Amateur Cup, USASA Open Cup, U.S. Open Cup
- Current champions: West Chester United (2017-2018)
- Most championships: Philadelphia United German-Hungarians, (16 USL titles)
- Website: unitedsoccerleague.us
- Current: 2018-2019

The United Soccer League of Pennsylvania is an amateur soccer league that operates in Eastern Pennsylvania, primarily in the greater Philadelphia area. The USL of PA is the premier amateur soccer league in the Philadelphia region and southeastern Pennsylvania.

== Overview ==
The league currently has 30 teams, spanning four divisions: The Major Division, The Major II Division, the Over 30 Division, and the Women's Major division. The Major II Division is composed mainly of reserve squads of the Major Division Teams.

== History ==
The United Soccer League of PA, originated from "United Soccer", an organization founded in the mid-1950s to sponsor international soccer games in our area. Eventually a few men from the organization came up with the idea to form a "German League". These men had pledged support from the Philadelphia United German-Hungarians, Phoenix SC, and the Vereinigung Erzgebirge. After a few weeks these men had their first open meeting and the preliminary work was done to form the league. A call went out to several other organizations such as Norristown, Allentown, Easton, Bethlehem, Camden, and Reading. In 1959, the idea of a "German League" was dropped and the UNITED SOCCER LEAGUE OF PENNSYLVANIA was founded.

=== Founders ===
- Frank Follmer - United German Hungarians
- John Piatka - United German Hungarians
- Carl Schmollinger - Phoenix SC
- Werner Kraheck - Reading Americans
- John Benkert - Schwarzwald Kickers
- John Weber - United German Hungarians
- Gustav Ingold - Vereinigung Erzgebirge
- Werner Fricker - United German Hungarians
- Carl Locher - Phoenix SC
- Hans Kompauer - Schwarzwald Kickers
- Erwin Green - Kolping SC
- Stephen Augenbaugh - Phoenix SC
- Alfred Hahn - Vereinigung Erzgebirge
- Karl Zaute - Vereinigung Erzgebirge
- William Robatzek - Phoenix SC
- Herman Trautz - Vereinigung Erzgebirge
- George Heinzelmann, Jr. - Vereingung Erzgebirge

=== Seasons ===
Over 200 organizations have played soccer in the USLofPA in several divisions.

==== 1959-1960 season ====
| Reading Americans | Phoenix SC | Philadelphia United German-Hungarians |
| V. Erzgebirge | Allentown | Schwarzwald Kickers |
| | Jangar | |

==== 1962-1963 season ====
| German Hungarians | Phoenix | Germ. Camden |
| V.Erzgebirge | Reading | Polish Eagles |
| Dalarda | Seabrook | Donauschwaben |

==== Current Men's Major Clubs ====
- Colonial SC
- Lighthouse United
- Phoenix Sport Club
- Ukrainian Nationals
- United German Hungarians
- Vereinigung Erzgebirge
- West Chester United
