= 1975 National Challenge Cup =

- Dewar Challenge Cup

Tournament details
- Country: United States
- Dates: 26 January – 15 June 1975

Final positions
- Champions: Maccabee Los Angeles (2nd title)
- Runners-up: New York Inter–Giuliana
- 1976 CONCACAF Champions' Cup: New York Inter–Giuliana

The 1975 National Challenge Cup was the 62nd edition of the United States Soccer Football Association's annual open soccer championship. Teams from the North American Soccer League declined to participate. The Maccabi Los Angeles defeated the New York Inter-Giuliana in the final game.

== Bracket ==
Round of 16
January 26 - San Francisco
SF Greek American	3
SFAC	1
March 2 - San Pedro
LA Maccabees	7
Club Hellas	1
April 13 - Milwaukee
Milwaukee Blue Ribbon	0
Chicago Lions SC	5
March 16 - St.Louis
St. Louis Kutis	1
Pepsi-Cola	0
April 6
NY Inter-Giuliana	4
Doxa SC	1
March 22 - Fall River
Fall River International
Boston Astros
May 11 - Harmarville
Harmarville	1
Croatian Rebels	2
April 13
Philadelphia Inter	2
Hoboken	0

Quarterfinals
March 9, 16 - SF/LA
Greek American	2-0
Maccabees	0-3
April 20
Lions
Kutis	w/o
April 27 - New Bedford
Boston Astros	1
Inter-Giuliana	3
May 18 - Cleveland
Croatian Rebels	1(5)
Philadelphia Inter	1(4)

Semi-finals
May 4 - Los Angeles
Maccabees	1
Kutis	0
May 25 - New York
Inter-Giuliana	5
Croatian Rebels	3

Final
June 15 - Torrance
Maccabees	1
Inter-Giuliana	0

== Sources ==
Boston Globe
Los Angeles Times
New York Times
The Plain Dealer
St.Louis Post-Dispatch
San Francisco Chronicle
