= Godwin Odiye =

Nigerian footballer

Personal information
- Full name: Godwin Odiye
- Date of birth: 17 April 1956 (age 70)
- Place of birth: Lagos, Nigeria
- Position: Defender

Youth career
- 1978–1982: San Francisco Dons

Senior career*
Years	Team	Apps	(Gls)
?–?	Nestle		
?–?	National Bank of Lagos		
1983–1994	Greek-Americans		

International career
1976–1980	Nigeria	39	(2)
- * Club domestic league appearances and goals

Godwin Odiye (born 17 April 1956) is a former Nigeria international football defender.

== Life ==
Odiye was born in Lagos in April 1956 to the family of Jonah and Cecilia Odiye. He attended St Paul's School, Ebute Metta, Eko Boys and then attended St Finbarr's, Akoka. He played football at both his primary and secondary schools. At St Finbarrs, he started out as a left-half back. In 1975, he was called to play for a junior team called the Nigerian Academicals. The team beat Ghana in 1975 giving Odiye attention among scouts.

Odiye began playing club football in Nigeria for third division league side, Nestle and later National Bank of Lagos. While playing for National Bank, Odiye also worked with the bank as a clerk. He worked in the morning and trained in the evening. In 1978, Odiye was recruited by University of San Francisco to play collegiate soccer. Odiye moved to the United States to attend college and after graduating in 1983, he played for a local semi-professional club Greek-American A.C. which he would help win the 1985 and 1994 U.S. Open Cup.

Odiye made several appearances for the senior Nigeria national football team, including FIFA World Cup qualifying matches, and played at the 1976 and 1980 African Cup of Nations finals. He is well known for scoring an own goal in a 1978 FIFA World Cup qualifying match against Tunisia.

In September 2003, Godwin began working at the College Preparatory School in Oakland, CA as a teacher of a Recreation, Health, & Fitness class.
