= San Francisco Soccer Football League =

American soccer league

- Founded: 1902; 124 years ago
- Country: United States
- Confederation: CONCACAF (NAFU)
- Number of clubs: 31
- Domestic cup: U.S. Open Cup
- International cup: CONCACAF Champions League
- Website: sfsfl.com

The San Francisco Soccer Football League or SFSFL, established in 1902, is "the oldest American soccer league in continuous existence."

The SFSFL is a men's semi-professional and amateur soccer league consisting of teams from San Francisco, California and surrounding cities in the Bay Area. The SFSFL is affiliated with the United States Adult Soccer Association region IV California Soccer Association-North and regularly sends teams to the National Amateur Cup. SFSFL teams have won the Lamar Hunt U.S. Open Cup four times.

== History ==
Established in 1902 as the California Football Association, the SFSFL is the oldest soccer league continuously operating in the United States, pre-dating even the 1913 foundation of the United States Soccer Federation. The next-oldest U.S. leagues, the Cosmopolitan Soccer League of New York City and the National Soccer League of Chicago, were formed in 1923 and 1938, respectively. With several community leaders and soccer enthusiasts, alike, they created football (soccer) clubs, such as: Pickwicks, Pastimes, Barbarians, Hornets, Vampires, American Rifles, Independents, Albion Rovers and the Thistles FC. These clubs help lay the foundation for organized adult soccer which led to the inception of the SFSFL. Teams played soccer matches on Sundays, competing with teams as far north as Sacramento when transportation was only by ferry-boat. Over time, the SFSFL helped launch the California Soccer Association and would compete in the first California State Cup in 1904. Dominating the national soccer scene from the earliest days, SFSFL teams have won four Lamar Hunt US Open Cup and numerous state and national titles, and hosted and played international. The SFSFL would be known across the country, producing memorable clubs, players, personalities, all-star games and national champions. SFSFL members have been inducted into both the US Soccer and CSAN Halls of Fame for contributing to the game.

Some of the league's earliest teams still in operation are:

- Olympic Club (1916)
- SFIAC (1917)
- SF Vikings SC (1922)
- Club Peru (1926)

== Organization ==
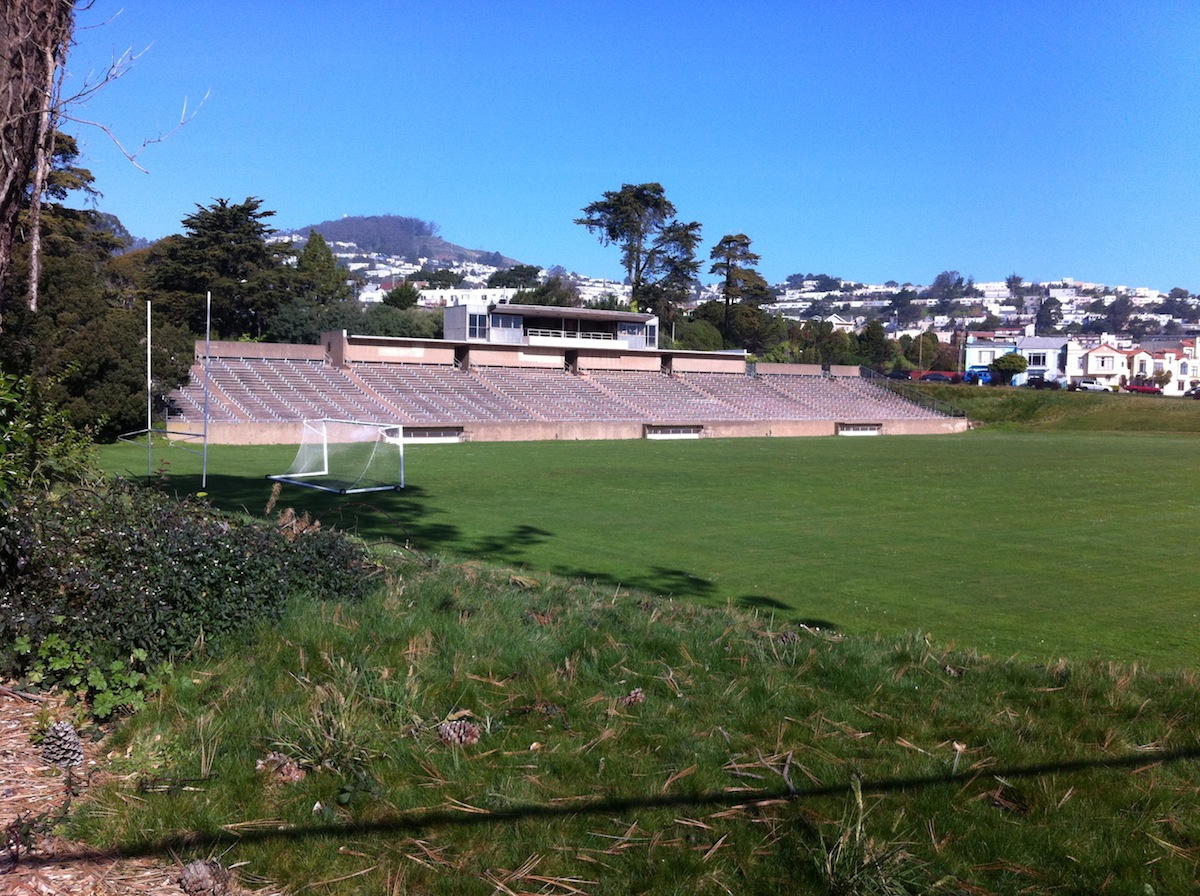
Boxer Stadium, one of the league venues

The league currently has three divisions, playing from March through November. Premier Division games are played at Boxer Stadium. Other divisions split games between Crocker Amazon Park, West Sunset, Beach Chalet, and the Polo Fields in Golden Gate Park.

Each team is individually owned and team owners approve new team membership. Annual divisional promotion and relegation occur keeping teams competitive. Division winners are awarded a permanent trophy with teams' names placed on the century-old trophy as well as awarded prize money. Players are granted amateur status preserving NCAA eligibility. Standard FIFA games laws are used. Teams are allowed 22 roster players, of whom 17 can play on game day. A three-referee crew are assigned to each match. Elite officials from FIFA to the state level travel across California to officiate in the SFSFL.

== 2026 team list ==
This is a list of the participants in the 2026 season:

=== Premier Division ===
- Club Marin
- International San Francisco
- Lands End FC
- Olympic Club
- Mexicali
- San Francisco Celtic
- San Francisco City
- San Francisco Elite SC
- San Francisco Glens
- San Francisco Hibernian FC
- San Francisco Italian AC
- San Francisco Vikings SC

=== Majors Division ===
- Azteca FC
- CD San Nicolás
- Club Tepa
- Deportivo Cometa
- Indy Athletic FC
- Inter San Francisco (Note: Reserve team.)
- FC Jabronis (Note: Formerly "FC Big Green".)
- Oakland SC (Note: Development team.)
- San Francisco Corinthians
- San Francisco Glens
- SF Young Boys
- Valencia Street Rovers

=== First Division ===
- 7x7 Club Deportivo
- Berenice SC
- Bluff City FC
- C.A. San Francisco
- El Farolito
- FC Jabronis
- Inter San Francisco
- Kopê FC
- Norcal Shockwaves FC
- Peninsula FC
- Persepolis SF
- San Francisco Glens (u-23)

=== Former clubs ===
- DZ United
- Juventus F.C.
- San Francisco Fog
- Sport Alianza FC
- Tornado
- Sport & Social Club
- United SC
- Club Marin
- FC Dirty Birds
- Innisfree FC
- MCFC
- Melchester Rovers FC
- Oakland Leopards FC
- Olympic Club
- San Francisco Battery FC
- Total Football FC
- Cobras FC
- Oakland SC

== Champions ==
Season	Premier Champion	Majors Division Champion	First Division Champion
1953		Greek-American A.C.	
1958		Greek-American A.C.	
1961		Greek-American A.C.	
1967	Greek-American A.C.		
1969	Greek-American A.C.		
1970	Greek-American A.C.		
1971	Greek-American A.C.		
1973	Greek-American A.C.		
1978	Greek-American A.C.		San Francisco Glens
1979	San Francisco Glens		
1981	Greek-American A.C.		
1983	Greek-American A.C.		
1984		San Francisco Glens	
1985	Greek-American A.C.		
1986	Greek-American A.C.		
1987	Greek-American A.C.		
1988	Greek-American A.C.		
1989	Greek-American A.C.		
1990		San Francisco Glens	
1991	Greek-American A.C.		
1992	El Farolito Soccer Club		
1993	El Farolito Soccer Club		
1994	Greek-American A.C.		
1995	Greek-American A.C.		
1996	El Farolito Soccer Club		
1999	El Farolito Soccer Club		
2001	El Farolito Soccer Club	San Francisco Glens	
2003	El Farolito Soccer Club		
2011	Deportivo GIMS	SF Celtic	SF City FC
2012	Mezcala SC	Tyneside FC	Berenice Reserves
2013	Mezcala SC	Bay City Rovers	Kezar FC
2014	Olympic Club	Olympic Club Reserves	SF Battery
2015	El Farolito	SF City FC Black	Primero de Mayo
2016	Olympic Club	Berenice	Total Football FC
2017	El Farolito Soccer Club	SF Celtic SC	Innisfree FC
2018	Olympic Club	SF Battery FC	SF Metropolitan FC
2019	Olympic Club	SF Metropolitan FC	Cantalao-Peru
2020	El Farolito Soccer Club	SF Celtic SC	Innisfree FC
2021	SF Vikings		San Francisco Glens
2022	SF Italian Athletic Club	International San Francisco	SF Young Boys
2023	Olympic Club	SF Metro Elite FC	Oakland SC Dev
2024	SFIAC	SF Young Boys	SF Glens SC U23
2025	Olympic Club	Mexicali FC	Valencia Street Rovers

== Notable Members ==
Lamar Hunt U.S. Open Cup Champions:

- 1976 San Francisco Italian Athletic Club
- 1985 Greek-American AC
- 1993 El Farolito Soccer Club
- 1994 Greek-American AC

National Amateur Cup Finalists:

- 1979 San Francisco Glens
- 1990 San Francisco Glens
- 1991 El Farolito Soccer Club

National Soccer Hall of Fame members:

- Matthew Boxer (1961)
- Ernie Feibusch (1984)
- Stephen Negoesco (2003)

United States men's national soccer team coach Lothar Osiander

United States men's national soccer team capped players:

- Alexi Lalas
- John Doyle
- C.J.Brown
- Troy Dayak
- Peter Woodring
- Christopher Sullivan
- Alberto Cruz

Major League Soccer players:

- John Doyle
- Troy Dayak
- C.J.Brown
- Peter Woodring
- Johnny Moore
- Christopher Sullivan
- Marquis White
