= El Farolito SC =

El Farolito
- Full name: El Farolito Soccer Club
- Nicknames: Faro; Burrito Boys
- Founded: 1985; 41 years ago
- Stadium: Boxer Stadium
- Capacity: 3,500
- Owners: Salvador Lopez
- Head Coach: Santiago Lopez
- League: National Premier Soccer League
- 2026: Golden Gate Conference: 1st Playoffs: Champions (2nd Title)
Home colors

El Farolito Soccer Club is a soccer club based in San Francisco, California. It currently plays in the National Premier Soccer League (NPSL), generally considered the fourth tier of U.S. Soccer, within the Golden Gate Conference. In the 2026 season El Farolito have also returned a team to the San Francisco Soccer Football League. The club is best known for its 1993 U.S. Open Cup championship under its previous name, Club Deportivo (CD) Mexico.

== History ==
The club was founded in 1985 by Salvador "Don Chava" Lopez and was named after Taqueria El Farolito, the owner's chain of restaurants. They played at Boxer Stadium and were a new force in the San Francisco Soccer Football League (SFSFL), where they started in the lower divisions. El Faro fielded teams with immigrant players, including former professionals, and employees of the restaurant chain. The team earned successive promotions to the top division of the SFSFL within five years. By the 1991–92 season, the club had won the SFSFL championship and had reached the final of the National Amateur Cup. The following season, El Faro retained the title as 'Club Deportivo Mexico'.

In 1993, San Francisco C.D. Mexico won the U.S. Open Cup, an American soccer competition open to all United States Soccer Federation (USSF) affiliated teams. The team pulled off wins against the defending tournament champion San Jose Oaks, Milwaukee Bavarian SC, before defeating United German Hungarians in the final. As U.S. Open Cup champions, C.D. Mexico qualified for the 1994 CONCACAF Cup Winners Cup and played Club Necaxa of the Mexican First Division in the quarterfinals. They lost 5–1 in San Jose.

When the California Premier Soccer Association (CPSA) was formed in 1993, CD Mexico was one of the SFSFL representatives along with Greek-American A.C., SF United, and Concordia. The CPSA was developed as a 'super league' composed of teams from the SFSFL, Peninsula Soccer League, and the San Joaquin Valley Soccer League. The team, returning to their original name El Farolito, won multiple titles over the next two and a half decades.

On November 20, 2017, El Farolito announced it would field a team in the National Premier Soccer League for the 2018 season.

On March 22, 2023, El Farolito defeated Inter San Francisco 3–0 in the first round of the 2023 U.S. Open Cup, scoring all three goals in extra time. The team lost in the second round to fellow Bay Area team Oakland Roots SC of the USL Championship.

El Farolito once again qualified for the Open Cup and defeated MLS Next Pro side Portland Timbers 2 in the first round on March 19, 2024. The reserve team was representing their parent team, the Portland Timbers of Major League Soccer. El Farolito defeated Central Valley Fuego FC, another third-division team, but were eliminated in the third round by the Oakland Roots for the second consecutive year. El Farolito won their first NPSL championship in 2024 by defeating FC Motown, a four-time finalist, 2–1.

El Farolito once again performed well in the 2025 US Open Cup, beating Real Monarchs of MLS Next Pro 3–1 in the first round and Monterey Bay FC of USL Championship 2–1 in the second. After that, their US Open Cup season came to a close, as they were defeated by USL Championship side Sacramento Republic in the third round on April 16th, 1–0. The club won its second NPSL championship in 2026, defeating Bristol Rhythm AFC 3-0.

=== Year-by-year ===
Year	League	Regular season	Playoffs	U.S. Open Cup	Notes
Limited information available on early seasons in the San Francisco Soccer Football League
1991–92	SFSFL (Note: Beginning in 1993, the SFSFL formed the California Premier Soccer Association (CPSA) along with the Peninsula Soccer League and the San Joaquin Valley Soccer League. The CPSA housed the top teams from all 3 leagues with yearly promotion and relegation cycles. In the late 2000s, the "Premier Division" name was adopted by the SFSFL as its new top division and the league began to only house teams from within its own ranks.)	1st, Major Division		did not qualify	
1992–93	SFSFL	1st, Major Division		Champions	Defeated United German-Hungarians, 5–0, in U.S. Open Cup Final
1993–94	SFSFL	No information available			
1994–95	SFSFL	No information available			
1995–96	SFSFL	1st, Premier Division		did not qualify	
1997	SFSFL	No information available			
1998	SFSFL	No information available			
1999	SFSFL	1st, Premier Division		did not qualify	
2000	SFSFL	3rd, Premier A Division		did not qualify	
2001	SFSFL	1st, Premier Division		did not qualify	
2002	SFSFL	2nd, Premier Division		did not qualify	
2003	SFSFL	1st, Premier Division		did not qualify	
2004	SFSFL	4th, Premier Division		did not qualify	
2005	SFSFL	3rd, Premier Division		did not qualify	
2006	SFSFL	3rd, Premier Division	Semifinal	did not qualify	Lost to San Francisco Glens SC in CPSA Semifinal
2007	SFSFL	1st, Premier Division	Champions	did not qualify	Defeated San Francisco Glens SC, 4–1, in the CPSA Final
2008	SFSFL	2nd, Premier Division	Semifinals	did not qualify	Lost to Olympic Club in the CSPA Semifinal
2009	SFSFL	1st, Premier Division	Champions	did not qualify	Defeated Rosal FAS, 2–0, in the CSPA Final
2010	SFSFL			did not qualify	
2011	SFSFL	2nd, Premier Division		did not qualify	
2012	SFSFL	1st, Premier Division	Champions	did not qualify	Defeated Olympic Club, 1–0, in Cup Final
2013	SFSFL	2nd, Premier Division	Champions	did not qualify	Defeated Olympic Club, 1–0, in Cup Final
2014	SFSFL	3rd, Premier Division	Semifinals	did not qualify	Lost to Olympic Club in Cup Semifinal
2015	SFSFL	1st, Premier Division	Champions	did not qualify	Defeated Olympic Club, 1–0, in Cup Final
2016	SFSFL	2nd, Premier Division	League Final	First Qualifying Round	Lost to Olympic Club in Cup Final
2017	SFSFL	1st, Premier Division	Champions	First round	Defeated Olympic Club, 3–2, in Cup Final
2018	NPSL	1st, Golden Gate Conference	Regional semifinal	Disqualified	Lost to FC Mulhouse Portland in Regional semifinal
2019	NPSL	5th, Golden Gate Conference	did not qualify	Second round	
2020	NPSL	Season cancelled due to COVID-19 pandemic			
2021	NPSL	Finalist, Golden Gate Conference Playoffs	Golden Gate Conference did not participate in regular league play	Not held	Lost to Academica SC in conference playoffs
2022	NPSL	2nd, Golden Gate Conference	Regional Finals	Did not qualify	Lost to Crossfire Redmond in Regional Finals
2023	NPSL	1st, Golden Gate Conference	Regional Finals	Second round	Lost to Crossfire Redmond in Regional Finals
2024	NPSL	1st, Golden Gate Conference	Champions	Third round	Defeated FC Motown, 2–1, in NPSL National Championship Game
2025	NPSL	1st, Golden Gate Conference	Finalist	Third round	Lost to Sacramento Republic FC 0–1

== Honors ==
San Francisco Soccer Football League

- Division 1 Champions (11): (Note: Includes California Premier Soccer Association titles) 1991–92, 1992–93, 1995–96, 1999, 2001, 2003, 2007, 2009, 2012, 2015, 2017
- Playoff Champions (6): 2007, 2009, 2012, 2013, 2015, 2017

National Premier Soccer League

- National Championship (2): 2024, 2026
- Golden Gate Conference Champions (6): 2018, 2022, 2023, 2024, 2025, 2026

U.S. Open Cup

- Champions (1) 1993
- Participants (7): 1993, 2017, 2019, 2023, 2024, 2025, 2026

CONCACAF Cup Winners Cup

- Participants (1): 1994

Hank Steinbrecher Cup

- Champions (1): 2025
