= 1993 U.S. Open Cup =

- Dewar Challenge Cup

Tournament details
- Country: United States

Final positions
- Champions: Club Deportivo Mexico
- Runners-up: Philadelphia United German-Hungarians
- 1994 CONCACAF Cup Winners Cup: Club Deportivo Mexico

The 1993 U.S. Open Cup was the 80th edition of the soccer tournament to crown the national champion of the United States.

San Francisco's Club Deportivo Mexico (SFSFL) won the Open Cup by defeating Philadelphia's United German-Hungarians 5–0 in the final at Kuntz Stadium in Indianapolis, Indiana.

With coach Salvador Lopez and marksman Jose Angulo aboard, CD Mexico had outdueled defending Open Cup holders San Jose Oaks 1–0 in earlier regional stages, then swept through the regional final to a semifinal meeting with the Milwaukee Bavarians. In that semifinal, Angulo's goal kept the game 1-1. With the game in overtime and the San Francisco side down to nine men, Angulo broke through on his own twice to give his beleaguered side a memorable 3–1 win.

== Bracket ==
Quarterfinals
WI	Milwaukee Bavarians	1
MO	Scott Gallagher	0
CA	CD Mexico	2^{a}
CA	Exiles SC	2
PA	United German-Hungarians	1
NY	New York Pancyprian-Freedoms	0
FL	McCormick Kickers	1^{b}
TX	Dallas Rockets	1

Semifinals
WI	Milwaukee Bavarians	1
CA	CD Mexico	3
PA	United German-Hungarians	2
FL	McCormick Kickers	0

Final
CA	CD Mexico	5
PA	United German-Hungarians	0

a) CD Mexico advance 4–1 on penalties
b) McCormick Kickers advance 5–4 on penalties

== Final ==
July 17, 1993

Club Deportivo Mexico	5–0	United German-Hungarians
17' Vladimir Moreno; 30' Elias Fonseca; 56' Jose Cid Del Prado; 58' Elias Fonseca; 80' Jose Cid Del Prado	(Report)

Kuntz Stadium,
Indianapolis, Indiana

MVP: Elias Fonseca
