= Jonathan Díaz =

Mexican footballer (born 1999)

Personal information
- Full name: Jonathan Alejandro Díaz Rivas
- Date of birth: 11 May 1999 (age 27)
- Place of birth: Monclova, Coahuila, Mexico
- Height: 1.78 m (5 ft 10 in)
- Position: Full-back

Team information
- Current team: El Farolito

Youth career
- 2018–2020: Santos Laguna

Senior career*
Years	Team	Apps	(Gls)
2020–2022	Santos Laguna	9	(0)
2023–2024	UAT	3	(0)
2025	Zacatepec	4	(0)
2026–	El Farolito	0	(0)
- * Club domestic league appearances and goals as of 5 December 2021

Jonathan Alejandro Díaz Rivas (born 11 May 1999) is a Mexican professional footballer who plays as a full-back for NPSL club El Farolito.

== Career statistics ==
=== Club ===
As of 5 December 2021

Club	Season	League			Cup		Continental		Other		Total	
Club	Season	Division	Apps	Goals	Apps	Goals	Apps	Goals	Apps	Goals	Apps	Goals
Santos Laguna	2018–19	Liga MX	—		1	0	—		—		1	0
Santos Laguna	2019–20	Liga MX	1	0	7	0	—		—		8	0
Santos Laguna	2020–21	Liga MX	6	0	—		—		—		6	0
Santos Laguna	2021–22	Liga MX	2	0	—		—		—		2	0
Santos Laguna	Total		9	0	8	0	—		—		17	0
Career total			9	0	8	0	0	0	0	0	17	0
