= 1976 National Challenge Cup =

- Dewar Challenge Cup

Tournament details
- Country: United States

Final positions
- Champions: San Francisco I.A.C. (1st title)
- Runners-up: New York Inter–Giuliana
- 1977 CONCACAF Champions' Cup: New York Inter–Giuliana

The 1976 National Challenge Cup was the 63rd edition of the USSF's annual open soccer championship. Teams from the North American Soccer League declined to participate. The San Francisco I.A.C. defeated the New York Inter-Giuliana of New York City in the final game. It was Inter-Giuliana's second consecutive trip to the National Cup finals that they lost.
