= San Francisco Celtic Soccer Club =

San Francisco Celtic
- Full name: San Francisco Celtic Soccer Club
- Nickname: Celtics
- Founded: 1969; 57 years ago
- League: SFSFL
- 2025: n/a
- Website: sfceltic.com
Home colours

The San Francisco Celtic Soccer Club is a soccer club in San Francisco, California. Founded in 1969 this soccer club takes pride in its Irish/Scottish roots and wears the same uniform as Celtic F.C. of the Scottish Premier League.

== History ==
The club was formed in 1969 by Irish and Irish Americans with the purpose of teaching Gaelic football to the youth of San Francisco. In 1971 the club decided to enter a team in the Police Athletic League competition with great success and in 1972 they entered teams in all age groups of the P.A.L.

In 1980 the club formed a senior team and applied to the San Francisco Soccer Football League choosing a new name, The San Francisco Celtic Soccer Club.

The Celtic Soccer Club now has three teams. Teams are made up of former youth internationals, pros, semi-pros, USISL, D1/D2 college players and recreational players.

== Organization ==
=== Men's team ===
There are two men's teams, Premier Division and First Division, in the San Francisco Soccer Football League.

=== Women's team ===
The women's team play in the Premier Division of the "Golden Gate Women's Soccer League".
