= Semioli =

Semioli is a surname. Notable people with the surname include:

- Franco Semioli (born 1980), Italian footballer
- Mark Semioli (born 1968), American footballer
