= Taqueria El Farolito =

Mexican restaurant chain in the Bay Area

- First location at 24th & Mission St

Restaurant information
- Established: 1982
- Food type: Mexican, Mexican-American
- Location: 2779 Mission St, San Francisco, CA (original location)
- Other locations: 10 locations total throughout the Bay Area (as of 2026)
- Website: elfarolitosf.com

Taqueria El Farolito ("The little lighthouse"), colloquially referred to as El Farolito, is a Mexican restaurant chain in the San Francisco Bay Area. The first location opened in the Mission District in San Francisco in 1982, and has grown to 10 locations as of 2026. El Farolito is acclaimed for its Mission-style burritos.

== History ==
The original Taqueria El Farolito was opened in 1982 at the corner of Mission and 24th Street in San Francisco's Mission District. Its owner, Mexican immigrant Salvador “Don Chava” Lopez Monroy, opened El Farolito with funds earned from selling his share in Taqueria San Jose which was a previous venture that he opened jointly with two friends. According to Don Chava's son, El Farolito was named after a taqueria Lopez worked at in Mexico City prior to immigrating to the United States.

Don Chava was able to use funds raised from the business to found his own soccer club, the San Francisco-based El Farolito SC, in 1985 and purchase a minor-league team in Mexico, the Gallos of Aguascalientes, in 1994.

Don Chava died at 70 on 5 January 2021, and his family took on operation of the business.

== Locations ==
As of 2021, El Farolito has grown to 12 locations throughout the Bay Area with four of them being in San Francisco. As of 2026, there are 10 locations.

=== 24th St & Mission ===
Menu and interior of the original El Farolito

The location at 2779 Mission St in the Mission District of San Francisco is the first El Farolito location.

=== North Beach ===
In August 2021, El Farolito announced that they would be opening their 12th location at 1230 Grant Avenue in San Francisco's North Beach neighborhood. The opening was temporarily halted by the San Francisco Planning Department as opening a 12th location classified the restaurant as formula retail, which are prohibited from operating within North Beach. The North Beach location was approved after El Farolito agreed to modify signage at some of its other locations in the Bay Area. The location opened in June 2022.

The situation led to debate on if the law which was intended to prohibit large chains was also harming local growing businesses.

=== Other locations ===
The locations in Santa Rosa and Rohnert Park are called El Favorito ("The Favorite") instead of El Farolito.

An El Farolito located at 358 Beach St in San Francisco's Fisherman's Wharf closed in 2020.

== Food ==
El Farolito is known for their Mission-style burritos, but also serves other Mexican food such as quesadillas, nachos, tacos, tostadas, and flautas. They also sell Mexican beverages like Mexican beers, agua frescas, and horchata.

Mission burrito and tortilla chips at El Farolito

Man eating a Mission burrito at El Farolito

=== Acclaim ===
El Farolito and its burritos are popular. In 2013, Esquire announced that El Farolito won their poll for "America's most life-altering burrito" with 40% of the vote. In 2017, Vice called the Mission burritos at El Farolito one of their Favorite Burritos in San Francisco. In 2019, El Farolito was featured in a list of the Top 100 Restaurants in the Bay Area by the San Francisco Chronicle. In 2020, an analysis of Foursquare's algorithm based on user check-ins, ratings, photos, and other metrics found that El Farolito was the top-rated Mexican restaurant in California. In 2021, San Francisco public figures such as Kari Byron, Lateefah Simon, and Mano Raju said that El Farolito is "their favorite place in San Francisco to get a burrito". Cesar Hernandez, a Restaurant Critic at the San Francisco Chronicle, ranked the burritos at El Farolito as the 5th best Mission-style burrito in the Mission as of 2023. In 2024, El Farolito was nominated as having "The best Mexican food in the Bay Area" in a readers’ choice poll in the SFGATE newspaper. In 2024, the Mission burritos at El Farolito were specifically mentioned in a Reuters' City Memo article.

In 2014, FiveThirtyEight created a 64 restaurant bracket in an attempt to find the best burrito in the nation. Despite being a fan favorite, the burritos at El Farolito ranked lower than those at Taqueria Cancún in San Francisco, and Chando’s Tacos in Sacramento in its group stage. The burritos at La Taqueria in San Francisco ended up winning the competition.
