= New York Inter-Giuliana =

New York Inter–Giuliana
- Full name: New York Inter–Giuliana
- Short name: NY Inter–Giuliana

The New York Inter–Giuliana was a soccer team based in New York City.

== History ==
The club was National Challenge Cup's runner-up in 1975 and 1976. They also participated on CONCACAF Champions' Cup in 1976 and withdrew in 1977.

== Honors ==
- National Challenge Cup
  - Runner-up (1): 1975, 1976
