= 1994 U.S. Open Cup =

- Dewar Challenge Cup

Tournament details
- Country: United States

Final positions
- Champions: Greek-American A.C. (2nd title)
- Runners-up: Bavarian Leinenkugel
- 1995 CONCACAF Cup Winners Cup: Greek-American A.C.

The 1994 U.S. Open Cup was the 81st edition of the soccer tournament to crown the national champion of the United States. This was the last tournament before the reintroduction of professional teams with A-League teams taking part in 1995 and MLS teams in 1996.

The Greek-American A.C. of San Francisco returned to claim a second national Open Cup championship (their first being in 1985), by defeating Milwaukee's Bavarian Leinenkugel 3–0 at UGH Field in Oakford, Pennsylvania.

On the way to the final, the San Francisco side ousted the San Jose Oaks 3-2 and Flamenco United 5-2 before narrowly overcoming L.A.'s Exiles 1–0. The Greeks then rolled to a 3–0 victory over the Philadelphia Flames in the semifinal. Lothar Osiander proved to be a lucky talisman for the team again as he faced former U.S. national team coach Bob Gansler's Milwaukee team in the final. Greek-American won the match behind two goals from Mike Deleray and one from Derek van Rheenen. The victory marked the third consecutive title for a Northern California team in the Open Cup.

== Bracket ==
Quarterfinals
CA	Greek-American A.C.	1
CA	Exiles SC	0
PA	Philadelphia Flames	3
NY	Hermes SC	0
WI	Bavarian Leinenkugel	2
IL	A.A.C. Eagles	1
FL	McCormick Kickers	2
TX	Dallas Rockets	0

Semifinals
CA	Greek-American A.C.	3
PA	Philadelphia Flames	0
WI	Bavarian Leinenkugel	w/o
FL	McCormick Kickers

Finals
CA	Greek-American A.C.	3
WI	Bavarian Leinenkugel	0

== Final ==
July 30, 1994

Greek-American A.C.	3–0	Bavarian Leinenkugel
56' Derek Van Rheenen; 61' Mike Deleray (Tim Martin); 81' Mike Deleray (Tim Martin)	(Report)

UGH Field
Oakford, Pennsylvania
Attendance: 400
