= Werner Fricker =

German-American soccer player

Personal information
- Full name: Werner Josef Fricker
- Date of birth: January 24, 1936
- Place of birth: Karlsdorf, Kingdom of Yugoslavia
- Date of death: May 30, 2001 (aged 65)
- Place of death: Horsham, Pennsylvania, United States

Senior career*
Years	Team	Apps	(Gls)
1954–1969	Phi. German-Hungarians		

International career
1963–1967	United States		

Managerial career
- Phi. United German-Hungarians
- * Club domestic league appearances and goals

Werner Fricker (January 24, 1936 – May 30, 2001) was a German-American soccer halfback who later became president of the United States Soccer Federation. He is a member of both the National Soccer Hall of Fame and the USASA Hall of Fame.

== Player ==
Fricker was born to a German-speaking family in Southern Banat, Yugoslavia but his family were forced to abandon their home during the national upheaval at the end of World War II. His family arrived in the United States in 1952 and settled in the Philadelphia area where Fricker started to play soccer for the German Hungarians in 1954. He had been selected for the United Soccer League all-star team for several seasons and was a member of the 1964 U.S. Olympic team. He spent most of his career with the United German-Hungarians of Philadelphia. He was the captain of the German Hungarians, as well as the president of the GH, and of the United Soccer league. While playing for the GH Fricker's team won the championship of the USLofPA 6 times in a row (GH Majors 1961–1966), as well as in 1968, and 1969. Fricker was captain and league delegate of the team. In 1964 the GH made it to the final of the Amateur Cup and lost to Chicago Schwaben, in Chicago. In 1965, Fricker and his teammates won the National Amateur Cup.

=== Philadelphia United German-Hungarians ===
Fricker began playing for the GH in 1954, and played continuously until 1969. He started playing in the reserves but was transferred to the Major Team a few seasons later. Fricker was named captain of the Major Team in 1958 and held this position until 1968. While playing for the GH Fricker's team won the Championship of the USLofPA 6 times in a row (GH Majors 1961–1966), as well as in 1968, and 1969. In 1964 the GH made it to the final of the Amateur Cup and lost to Chicago Schwaben, in Chicago. In 1965, Fricker and his teammates won the National Amateur Cup.More information about the 1965 Final can be found here GH 1965 Championship. The German Hungarians were Eastern Champions three times during Fricker's time with them (1964, 1965, 1966), U.S. National Amateur Finalists twice (1964, 1966), as well as Eastern Pennsylvania Champions for eight seasons. Fricker coached for the GH, coaching the U-14 Team, the Reserve Team, as well as the Major Team. Fricker was the secretary of the GH from 1962 to 1966. He was the president of the club from 1968 to 1976. Fricker held almost every position within the GH organization. He was part of the dance group, served as the entertainment chairman, was on the Constitution committee, served on the building committee, was the Kirchweih chairman, and was the chairman of the board. "There has been no one in almost fifty years club history who has had more impact, who has contributed more in all aspects, and has dedicated his efforts both financially and through leadership for our well being as a club than Werner Fricker" – Werner Fricker Jr., Past President German Hungarians

=== United States men's national soccer team ===
In 1963 Fricker was selected as an alternate for the U.S. Olympic Team that would play in the Pan American Games. He continued to be in the U.S. player pool until 1967. In 1963 Fricker was the first Philadelphian to represent Olympic soccer since 1956, and was believed to be the 4th ever, behind Jack Dunn, Walter Bahr, and Ray Wilson.

=== United Soccer League of Pennsylvania ===
In 1959 United Soccer League of Pennsylvania was formed with the German Hungarians as a founding member. German Hungarian Frank Follmer became the first president of the new league. Over their years of involvement in the USLofPA many members of the German Hungarians have been involved in the running of the league. As a player, Fricker had been selected for the United Soccer League all-star team numerous times. He played for the all-star team from 1958 to 1968, and served as captain from 1963 to 1968. Fricker also coached the league's U-16 Select Team.

== Executive ==
Fricker was president of the United States Soccer Federation from 1984 to 1990, executive vice president from 1975 to 1984, and vice president from 1974 to 1975. It was during Fricker's tenure as president of U.S. Soccer that the United States was awarded the right to host the 1994 World Cup, an event that significantly advanced the popularity of soccer in the United States. He also was instrumental in contributing to the qualification of the national team to the 1990 FIFA World Cup after a 40-year absence and hired the team's first full-time coach (Bob Gansler). Fricker was defeated for re-election by Alan Rothenberg in 1990.

During his time serving in the U.S. administrative structure, Fricker also sat on the CONCACAF executive committee.

Werner Fricker was a founder of the USLofPA. He served as president of the USLofPA from 1970 to 1972, and secretary from 1967 to 1970.

== Soccer experience ==
- Playing:

- United States Olympic Team – 1964
- United Soccer League of Pennsylvania

All Star Team 1958–1968
Captain 1963–1968

- Philadelphia United German-Hungarians 1954–1969

Captain 1958–1969
U.S. National Amateur Cup Champions – 1965
U.S. National Amateur Cup Finalists – 1964 & 1966
Eastern Champions – 1964 & 1966

- United Soccer League Champions – Eight Seasons
- Eastern Pennsylvania Champions – Eight Seasons

- Coaching:

- United Soccer League of Pennsylvania

U-16 Select Team

- Philadelphia United German-Hungarians

U-14 Team
Reserve Team
Major Team

- Administration:

- United States Soccer Federation

Executive Vice President 1975–1984
Vice President 1974–1975
President 1984–1990

- USSF Committee Chairman

1986 World Cup Organizing Committee
International Games Committee
Technical Committee
Restructuring Committee
Marketing Committee
Geographical Delineating Committee

- Eastern Pennsylvania Soccer Association

President 1972–1974

- United Soccer League of Pennsylvania

President 1970–1972
Secretary 1967–1970

- Philadelphia United German-Hungarians

President 1968–1976
Secretary 1962–1966
