= San Francisco Vikings Soccer Club =

San Francisco Vikings
- Full name: San Francisco Vikings Soccer Club
- Founded: 1922; 104 years ago
- President: Elizabeth Rappolt
- Director of Coaching: Joey Almeida
- League: SFSFL
- 2025: ?
- Website: sfvikings.org
Home colours

The San Francisco Vikings Soccer Club is a soccer club in San Francisco, California. Founded in 1922 the club is involved in all playing levels from the under 5 years-old microsoccer program, the various recreational and competitive youth programs, the men's team in the San Francisco Soccer Football League, through the stumblers senior program.

== History ==
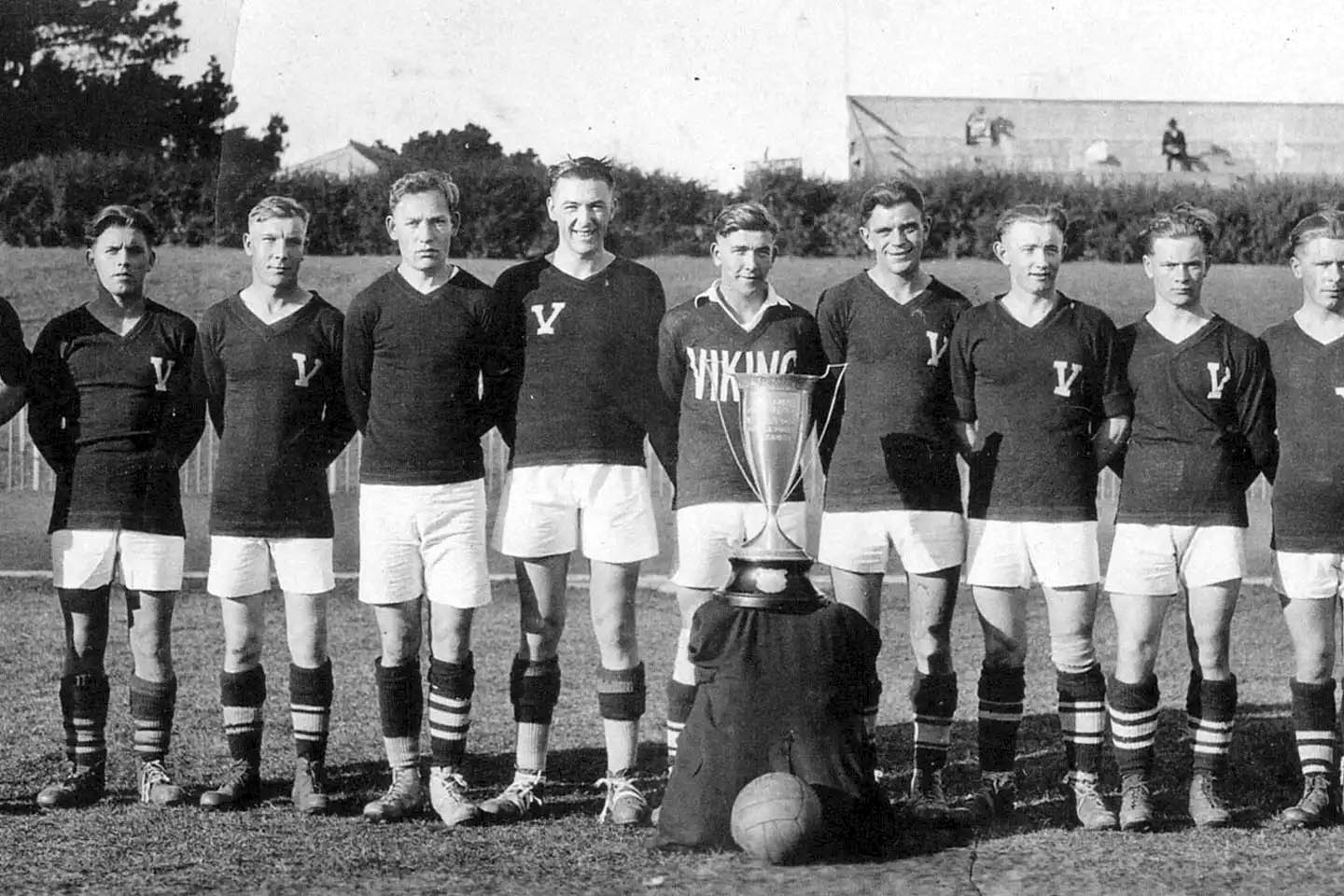
Vikings team with their trophy after winning the University and Club Championship in 1924

The San Francisco Vikings were formed in April 1922 by Danish immigrants at a time when football already had deep roots in the city’s diverse immigrant communities. The club’s early years were shaped by figures such as goalkeeper Arthur Andersen, who arrived as a young sailor and helped the Vikings win the University and Club League championship in their second season. The Vikings became known for their red and white striped shirts and secured the California State Cup in 1936, a team that included future United States international and University of San Francisco coach Gus Donoghue.

Long-term stability came through Derk Zylker, a former Dutch international goalkeeper who became president in 1937 and established the club’s youth programme in 1939. After a wartime pause, the academy produced a strong postwar generation known as the Mighty Vikings, including Zylker’s son Hommo Zylker, who later served as club president and narrowly missed out on United States Olympic selection. Other players from this era included Olympian Marty Krumm and international goalkeeper Victor Ottoboni.

The youth system shaped football across the Bay Area. Alumni such as Ernst Feibusch and Steve Negoesco became influential coaches and administrators, building youth leagues, winning major college titles and contributing to the sport’s growth regionally and nationally. The academy continued to generate talent into the 1970s, producing North American Soccer League players such as Jim Zylker and Otey Cannon, while also expanding into girls’ football and helping lay the foundation for teams such as the San Francisco Nighthawks.

Although the senior side struggled in the 1970s and 1980s as graduates joined other local clubs, the Vikings endured. By the 2020s, the club had more than 800 children in its development programme, maintained activity during the COVID-19 pandemic and saw its senior team return to the top of the San Francisco Soccer Football League. In 2022, the Vikings marked their centenary with reunion events, a Hall of Fame ceremony and a city proclamation recognising 4 June as Vikings Soccer Club Day.

== Organization ==
=== Select teams ===
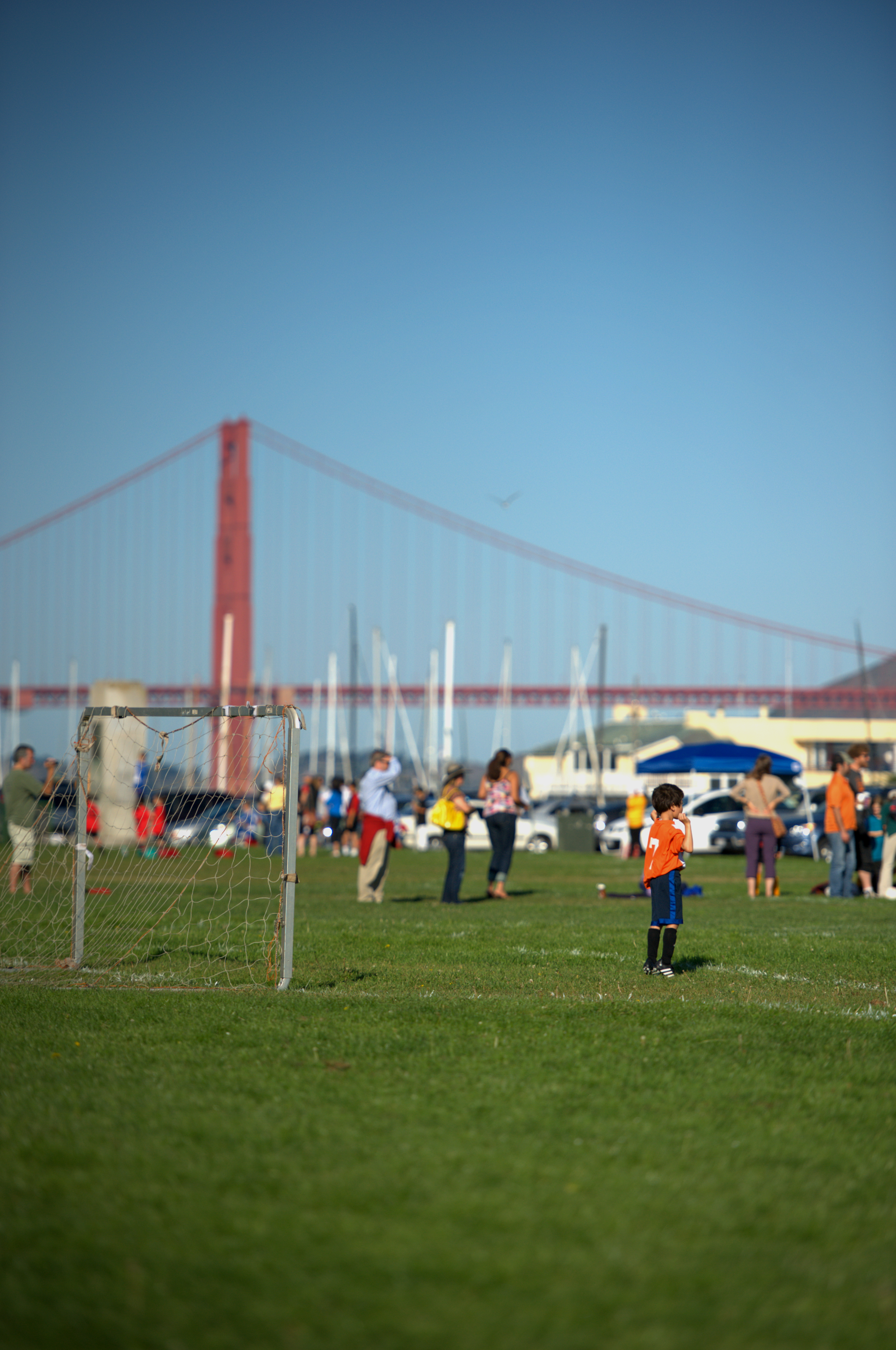
Microsoccer played on the Marina Green.

The Vikings Club runs a select team program, which includes CYSA Gold, Silver Elite, Silver, Bronze & Copper "travel" teams that play in the CYSA Cal Soccer League against travel teams from other soccer clubs in Northern California, and CCSL Prep teams that play in the Vikings CCSL Prep League. The Vikings Club has sent many players to the Olympic Development Program over the years.

=== Men's team ===
The Vikings men's team is coached by Pat Cadam and plays in the Premier Division of the SFSFL.

=== Recreation League ===
The club has a recreational league for Under 15 to Under 18 players who want to continue to play soccer after they age out of the Vikings League but do not want to commit to a Select Team.

=== Microsoccer ===
The club runs the pioneering Microsoccer program. Microsoccer is a fall and spring program for Under 5 through Under 7 players just learning to play soccer.

=== Summer Camps ===
The club runs summer camps for players from age 5 to age 12; Elite Skills Camps focused on striker, defender and goalie training for players from age 11 to age 15; and a fall and spring 7 v 7 camp.
