= Phoenix SC =

American soccer club

First German Sport Club Phoenix (commonly known as Phoenix SC) is an American soccer club based in Feasterville, Pennsylvania. The club plays in the United Soccer League, a Region I soccer league that is under the United States Adult Soccer Association umbrella, which represents the fifth-tier of the United States soccer league system.
