= Jack Dunn (soccer) =

American soccer player and coach (born 1931)

Personal information
- Full name: John Fowler Dunn
- Date of birth: September 12, 1931 (age 95)
- Place of birth: Philadelphia, Pennsylvania, U.S.
- Position: Inside right

Youth career
- 1951–1954: Temple University

Senior career*
Years	Team	Apps	(Gls)
- Uhrik Truckers
- Philadelphia United German-Hungarians

Managerial career
- 1958–1975: St. Joseph’s College
- * Club domestic league appearances and goals

John Fowler Dunn (born September 12, 1931) is an American retired soccer inside right who was a four-time All-American, a member of the U.S. soccer team at the 1952 Summer Olympics. He was a four-time All-American and coached at the collegiate level.

== Player ==
Dunn grew up in Philadelphia, Pennsylvania, where he played for the Lighthouse Boys Club and was three-time All City at Northeast Public High School. He then attended Temple University, playing on the men's soccer team from 1951 to 1954. He was a 1951 Honorable Mention (third team) All-American, 1953 Second Team All-American and 1952 and 1954 First Team All-American. He graduated in 1955. He was inducted into the Temple Hall of Fame in 1975. In 1952, he was a member of the U.S. soccer team at the 1952 Summer Olympics.

Dunn may have spent several years with Uhrik Truckers in the American Soccer League. He played for the Brooklyn German Hungarians for a time. He also played and coached for the Philadelphia United German-Hungarians winning the 1965 National Amateur Cup with them. He played on four professional championship teams.

Dunn spent several years in the U.S. Army. He was discharged in 1958 and began working at Gulf Oil Company.

== Coach ==
Dunn later coached at both the amateur and collegiate levels. In 1958, he was hired by St. Joseph's College in Philadelphia. He coached the school's team until 1975, compiling a 120–57–23 record.
