= San Francisco Italian Athletic Club =

Men's social and athletic club in San Francisco, California, US

San Francisco Italian AC
- San Francisco Italian Athletic Club
- Abbreviation: SFIAC
- Formation: 1917; 109 years ago
- Type: Men's social and sports club
- Headquarters: San Francisco, U.S.
- Affiliations: SFSFL (soccer)
- Website: sfiac.org
- Formerly called: Circolo Recreativo Italiano Virtus

The San Francisco Italian Athletic Club is a men's social and athletic club located at 1630 Stockton Street on Washington Square, North Beach in San Francisco, California. It sponsors the Statuto Race, an annual footrace event that has been running since 1919 and is open to all kind of participants.

== History ==
The current club was the result of the merger of several smaller Italian sports clubs in San Francisco. The first club formed in 1917 and was called Circolo Ricreativo Italiano Virtus. In 1919 a second club emerged called Unione Sportiva Italiana. Shortly thereafter Sporting Club Italia began in 1920. The following year SC Italia joined with Virtus becoming Italia Virtus Club.

In 1926 they merged with Unione to become the largest Italian sports club in the country as Unione Sportiva Italiana Virtus. By 1936 the current building of the club had been completed at which point they became known as Italian Athletic Club. Negative sentiment during the World War II period led to the club dropping 'Italian' from their name and continued as simply San Francisco Athletic Club until 1979 when 'Italian' was once again part of their name.

== Sports ==
The club has participated in numerous sporting activities including baseball, basketball cycling, fencing, gymnastics, running, and soccer. Their Statuto Race is among the oldest annual foot races in the country having started back in 1919 to commemorate Italy's first constitution as a cohesive nation. One of the club's highest achievements was accomplished by their soccer team when they won the 1976 National Challenge Cup. Steve Negoesco, of USF fame, was the coach of the champion soccer team.

Other notable people from the SFIAC are Ray Piva (runner), Steve Landi (power lifter), Gino Cimoli (baseball), and Steve Mariucci (football).

In 2016, SFIAC's men's soccer team was promoted to the San Francisco Soccer Football League (SFSFL) Premier Division, which returns the team to the top local semi-professional level within the San Francisco Bay Area. SFIAC's soccer team still competes in the SFSFL Premier Division to this day.

=== Statuto Race ===
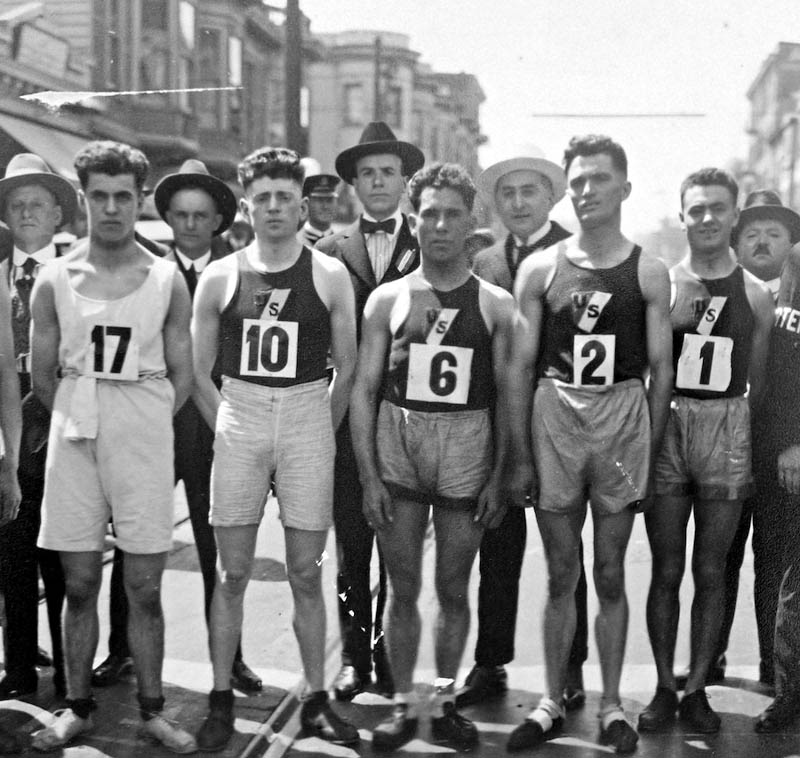
Statute Race competitors in 1919. In dark jersey, athletes from the club

This is an annual footrace, started in 1919 by the Unione Sportiva Italiana predecessor of the continuing club. It celebrates the creation of Italy's first constitution, the Statuto Albertino. It is one of a number in the Bay Area such as the Dipsea (started in 1905) and Bay to Breakers (started in 1912 as the "Cross City Race"). The Statuto and these others are among the oldest footraces in the United States.

A National Park Service document stated, about the Statuto: "The annual footrace across city streets energized the North Beach community, largely composed of Italian immigrants looking for a better life in America. The club's activism in community improvement included not only the footrace and other sports but also culture and community service."

It had its 101st running on June 5, 2022, with an 8K footrace won in 24 minutes and 54 seconds. There was also a 2M walk event.

== Bibliography ==
- Pierucci, Gianrico Claudio. The Heart of North Beach. SFIAC Press, 2008, ISBN 978-0-9702109-6-8
