= Lothar Osiander =

American soccer coach (born 1939)

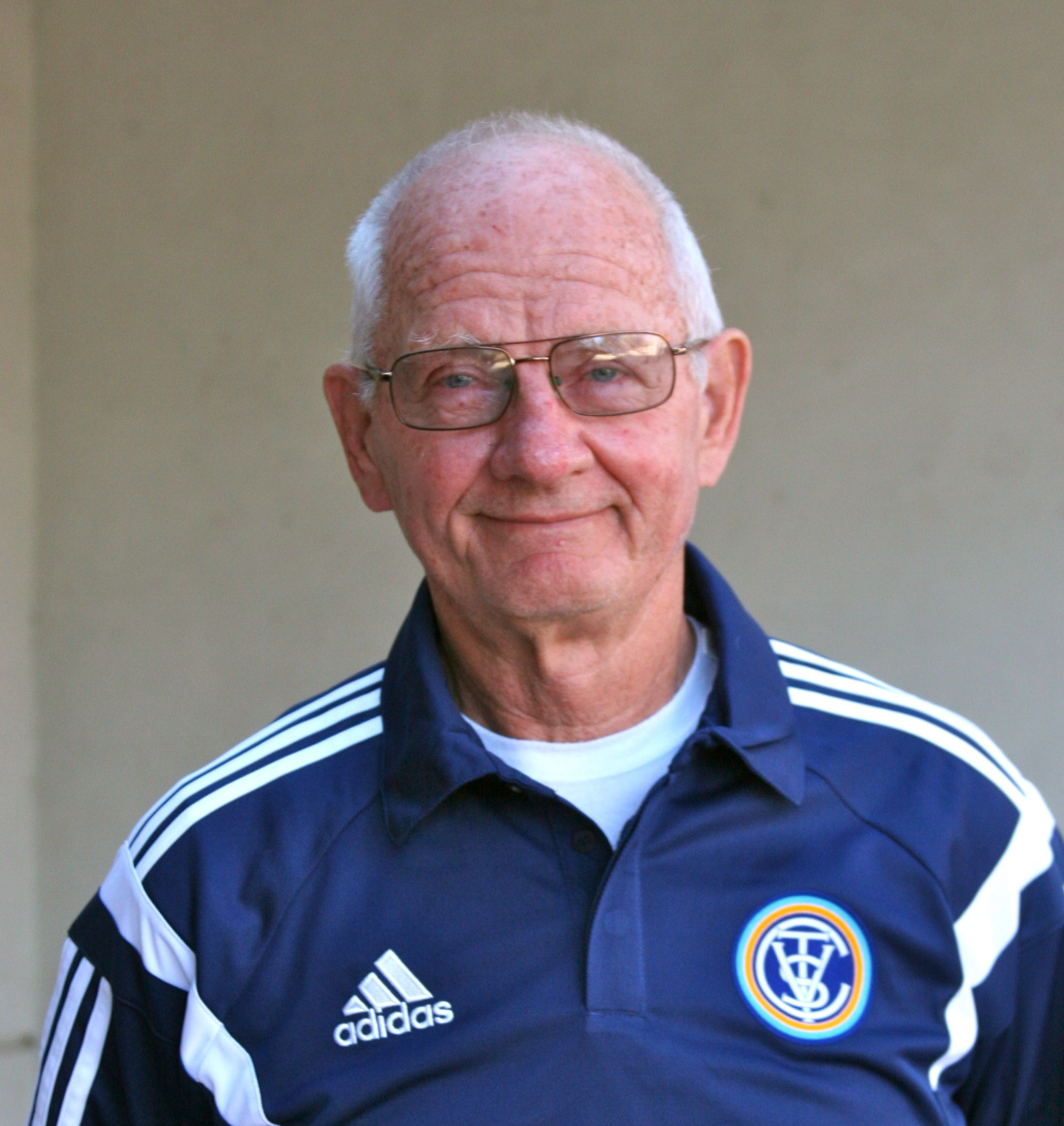
- Osiander in 2015

Personal information
- Date of birth: November 8, 1939 (age 87)
- Place of birth: Munich, Germany
- Position: Midfielder

Youth career
- Years: Team
- 1964–1965: City College of San Francisco
- 1966–1967: University of San Francisco

Managerial career
- California Surf (assistant)
- –1985: San Francisco Greek-Americans
- 1986–1988: United States
- 1988–1992: United States U23
- –1991: San Francisco Bay Blackhawks (assistant)
- 1992: Palo Alto Firebirds
- 1995: Atlanta Ruckus
- 1996–1997: Los Angeles Galaxy
- 1998–1999: Tampa Bay Mutiny (assistant)
- 1999: Project 40
- 1999–2000: San Jose Earthquakes
- –2007: San Francisco Greek-Americans

Lothar Osiander (born November 8, 1939) is a German soccer coach who has served as head coach to the U.S. national and Olympic teams as well as the Atlanta Ruckus, Los Angeles Galaxy and San Jose Clash.

== Biography ==
Osiander moved to the United States with his family in 1958, settling in the San Francisco area. He attended Mission High School. After graduating from high school, he first attended the City College of San Francisco, then the University of San Francisco where he played on the men's soccer team under legendary coach Steve Negoesco. In 1966, the Dons won the NCAA Men's Soccer Championship. Osiander graduated with degrees in physical education and Spanish in 1968. By that time he had become a U.S. citizen, gaining his citizenship in 1965.

Osiander was an assistant coach with the California Surf of the North American Soccer League (NASL).

Osiander eventually returned to San Francisco, becoming a waiter at Graziano's, a local restaurant, while playing and coaching in the city's highly competitive soccer leagues. In 1985, he coached a semi-pro club, the San Francisco Greek-Americans, to the National Challenge Cup title.

By that time, Osiander was well known on the national coaching scene. Back in 1974, the United States Soccer Federation (USSF) had hired Osiander as part of its coaching staff. At the time Walter Chyzowych was the U.S. head coach and in that capacity would travel the country putting on coaching clinics. Osiander traveled as part of Chyzowich's team and became known as an excellent teacher and coach. In 1978, the U.S. Olympic committee inaugurated a National Sports Festival, hiring Osiander as the West team soccer coach. He continued in this position for the next ten years.

By 1986, Osiander's success with the Olympic Festivals and the Greek Americans led Chyzowich, now head of USSF, to hire Osiander to replace fired Alkis Panagouliasas as the head coach of the U.S. national team. The team was in the middle of rebuilding following its failure to qualify for the 1986 FIFA World Cup. As the International Olympic Committee (IOC) allowed countries outside of Europe and South America to field their full national teams in the Olympics, Osiander turned his attention to qualification for the 1988 Summer Olympics to be held in Seoul, South Korea. The qualification campaign nearly ended as soon as it began when Canada defeated the U.S. 2–0 in the first leg of their home and away first round series. At the time, series winners were decided on goal differential with away goals counting for two points and home goals only one. In other words, the U.S. needed to win the follow-up game 3–0. If it let Canada gain even one goal in the game in the U.S., then the score would need to be 5–1 for the U.S. to make the next round. On May 30, 1987, Osiander's team rose to the challenge and shutout Canada, while scoring the three needed goals. The U.S. went on a tear in the second round, going undefeated against Trinidad and El Salvador, outscoring its opponents 13 to 4, and winning a spot in Seoul. In those games, the U.S. underachieved, running to a 1–1–1 record and failing to make the second round. On January 16, 1989, USSF released Osiander when it announced the hiring of Bob Gansler as the full-time national team coach. By this time Osiander had set the U.S. national team back on track. In addition to the marvelous Olympic qualification campaign, Osiander led the team through a successful first round of World Cup qualification with a scoreless away tie with Jamaica followed by a 5-1 crushing of the Reggae Boyz. Osiander compiled a 13–7 record with the team in full internationals during his tenure as coach.

While he left the senior national team in 1989, Osiander continued to coach the U.S. B Team and eventually the U.S. U-23 national team. After the 1988 Olympics, USSF began signing U.S. players to national team contracts. These players formed an A team while fringe or up and coming players spent time with the B Team. Additionally, the IOC had decided to make the Olympic soccer tournament an U-23 competition. In 1991, Osiander coached the U.S. U-23 team to a gold medal at that year's Pan American Games, held in Cuba. That year, Osiander also began preparing the team for the 1992 Summer Olympics to be held in Barcelona, Spain. The team easily ran through qualification and had high hopes for success in Spain. In one of the many inexplicable moments in U.S. soccer history, Osiander benched his leading scorer, Steve Snow, for the team's first Olympic match. Snow had led the U.S. team at the Pan American games with four goals, then bagged eleven more in nine games of Olympic qualifying. However, Osiander did not fail to mask his dislike for Snow, calling him a "cocky twerp". But without Snow, the U.S. offense stalled and the team lost 2–1 to Italy. Osiander played Snow in the next two games. While Snow scored in both, a win and a tie, it was not enough and the U.S. failed to make the second round. USSF president Alan Rothenberg fired Osiander after the Olympics, based largely on Osiander's refusal to play Snow in the game with Italy.

When not coaching, Osiander had continued to work at Graziano's, rising from waiter to maître d'. However, in 1992, the restaurant was sold to new management who let Osiander go. Out of work, he turned to coaching the Palo Alto Firebirds of the USISL. While working at Graziano's, he had spent time as an assistant coach with the San Francisco Bay Blackhawks of the American Professional Soccer League (APSL) before it folded in 1992. He also continued coaching the San Francisco Greek-Americans. In 1994, he took the Greek-Americans to its second U.S. Open Cup title. In all likelihood this team will remain the last amateur or semi-pro team to win the National Cup.

As he no longer had a job either with Graziano's or the national team and since semi-pro or assistant coaches rarely earn much, Osiander was forced into full-time professional coaching. In 1995, the expansion Atlanta Ruckus of the A-League hired Osiander as its first coach. Despite finishing the regular season fourth out of six, the Ruckus made it to the A-League championship series, only to fall to the Seattle Sounders. For his efforts Osiander was honored as A-League coach of the year.

Osiander's success with the Greek-Americans and Ruckus brought him to the attention of the newly created Major League Soccer club Los Angeles Galaxy which hired him as its first coach. The Galaxy began the first MLS season with 12 straight victories, finishing with a 19–13 record. The Galaxy went to the championship game only to fall to the Bruce Arena-coached D.C. United, 3–2 in overtime. However, in 1997, the Galaxy began 3-9 and on June 10, 1997, the team fired Osiander.

In January 1998, the Tampa Bay Mutiny hired Osiander as an assistant coach. When John Kowalski, head coach of the Mutiny, was fired in 1999, some observers thought Osiander would serve as interim coach. Instead, he left the Mutiny and was hired as head coach of the MLS Project 40 team. In September 1999, the San Jose Clash hired Osiander to replace Brian Quinn near the end of the 1999 season. At the time, Osiander was leading the Project 40 team into the United Soccer League playoffs where it lost in the semifinals to the Minnesota Thunder. Once the Project 40 team was eliminated from the playoffs, Osiander joined the Clash, taking the team to a 2–1 record in his three games to close out the 1999 season. Despite the good start at the end of the 1999, Osiander could do little better than his predecessors when it came to a full season. In 2000, he took the team to a 7-17-8 record and on January 12, 2001, the Earthquakes fired Osiander.

Since leaving MLS, he returned to his position as coach of the San Francisco Greek-Americans. He also coaches local Bay area youth teams, including the U-17 Ballistic Boys which won the 2003 State Cup as an U-16 team. Finally, he is the head coach of San Ramon United, an U-17 team.

The NSCAA awarded Osiander the Walt Chzyowich Award in 2007. He was selected to be the coach of the U-16 Tri-Valley Boys for the 2009 season. He is currently coaching them. He also temporarily took over for the U-19 Tri-Valley Arsenal, due to the absence of former coach Terry Weekes. This was Osiander's last known coaching position.
