= Alan Rothenberg =

American lawyer (born 1939)

President of the U.S. Soccer Federation
- In office 1990–1998
- Preceded by: Werner Fricker
- Succeeded by: Robert Contiguglia

Personal details
- Born: April 10, 1939 (age 87) Detroit, Michigan, US
- Education: University of Michigan
- Occupation: Lawyer

Alan Isaac Rothenberg (born April 10, 1939) is an American lawyer and businessman, known for his involvement in soccer in the United States. He is the namesake of the Alan I. Rothenberg Trophy, which was awarded annually to the winner of the MLS Cup from 1996 to 2007. Rothenberg was president of U.S. Soccer, the governing body of American soccer, during the 1990s and oversaw the 1994 FIFA World Cup and the 1999 Women's World Cup in the United States and the establishment of Major League Soccer in 1996.

Rothenberg earned the FIFA Order of Merit in 2006. Rothenberg was inducted into the U.S. National Soccer Hall of Fame in 2007 in recognition of his contribution as a "Builder" of the sport in the United States.

== Early career ==
Rothenberg was born in 1939 in Detroit, Michigan to Edward and Belle Rothenberg. He graduated at the top of his class in 1963 from the University of Michigan Law School. After law school, he moved to California and began working as a lawyer at the law firm of O'Melveny & Myers. He was a fan and follower of traditional American sports.

== Soccer ==
=== NASL ===
Rothenberg had no experience with soccer until the age of 28, when he came into contact with the nascent North American Soccer League while working as a lawyer for Jack Kent Cooke. Cooke, who owned several sports teams, had also acquired the NASL's Los Angeles Wolves, a short-lived team that lasted only until 1968.

Almost ten years after the folding of the Wolves, Rothenberg headed an investment group that bought the Los Angeles Aztecs, a newer club in the same league, but he sold the team after three seasons in 1980, thus escaping the later collapse of the league. Rothenberg later stated that his timing in buying the team had simply been wrong — "I mistakenly thought the time was right and three years later I realized that the time was wrong. I liked soccer, thought it was a great opportunity then, and thought it was now."

=== U.S. Soccer ===
In 1984, Rothenberg was asked by Peter Ueberroth, the organizer of the 1984 Summer Olympics in Los Angeles, to take on the role of commissioner of soccer for the Olympic Games. The unexpected popularity of soccer that summer — including multiple sell-outs of the 100,000+ seat Rose Bowl — established before the world that an American audience for the game existed. The success of soccer at the 1984 Olympics, under Rothenberg's leadership, was a significant factor in FIFA awarding the United States in 1988 the right to host the 1994 World Cup.

Rothenberg's success in the capacity of commissioner caused FIFA to seek out his services as director of the 1994 World Cup, which FIFA had decided award to the US. In 1990, with FIFA's backing, Rothenberg defeated the unpopular incumbent Werner Fricker in a landslide in an election for the Presidency of the United States Soccer Federation. Rothenberg was then named Chairman of the World Cup 1994 Organizing Committee. Rothenberg pushed for the 1994 World Cup to be held in large venues. Under Rothenberg's guidance, the 1994 World Cup was a major success. The tournament set records for attendance, with the 2.5 million attendance breaking the previous record by 1 million, and resulted in U.S. Soccer earning a surplus of more than $50 million.

Fulfilling a promise to FIFA made as part of the World Cup bid, Rothernberg oversaw the establishment of Major League Soccer, the first fully professional U.S. outdoor league since the NASL. Rothenberg was president of the U.S. Soccer Federation for two four-year terms until 1998, when term limits forced him to step down from the post. Rothenberg also chaired the 1999 FIFA Women's World Cup which was hosted by the United States and was the historic breakthrough event in women's sports.

In 1998, Rothenberg headed a bid by the Japanese advertising agency Dentsu to buy the San Jose Clash of MLS, but was forced to pull out at a late date due to the Asian stock market crisis.

== Basketball ==
Rothenberg was also an important figure in professional basketball for many years, first as an executive and legal counsel for the Los Angeles Lakers when they were owned by Jack Kent Cooke, during which he participated in acquiring first Kareem Abdul Jabbar and then Magic Johnson for the Lakers. Later he served as an executive and legal counsel of Donald Sterling's San Diego / Los Angeles Clippers from 1982 to 1989, during which time he engineered the successful movement of the team from San Diego to Los Angeles without NBA permission. In the NBA he chaired the TV And Labor Committees.

== Law and business ==
Rothenberg was a partner in the Los Angeles offices of the law firms Manatt, Phelps, Rothenberg & Phillips and Latham & Watkins, and in 1989–1990 he was president of the California State Bar. in 2019 he received the University of Michigan Law School Distinguished Alumni Award.

Before his 2010 resignation, he was president of the Los Angeles World Airports Commission. During his tenure he led the effort to approve a master plan for the development of Los Angeles International Airport.

In 2004, Rothenberg founded 1st Century Bank, a community bank with offices on the Westside Los Angeles area catering to entrepreneurs, small businesses and professionals. Rothenberg is Market Chairman of the bank, which was acquired by Oklahoma City-based MidFirst Bank in early 2016. Earlier in his career, Rothenberg was a co-founder (along with his then law partner Chuck Manatt) of First Los Angeles Bank, which was sold to City National Bank in 1995.

In 2003, Rothenberg and Randy Bernstein formed Premier Partnership, a company that consults, values and sells sponsorships and naming rights for arenas, stadiums, entertainment facilities and other commercial properties. In 2022 Premier merged into Playfly Sports.

Rothenberg has also on several public corporate (Zenith National, Arden Realty, CPK and several community banks)and public boards, including current Chairman of the Los Angeles Tourism Board and past President of the Los Angeles Airport Commission and the Greater Los Angeles Chamber of Commerce as well as board memberships on the Los Angeles Sports Council, the Los Angeles Committee for the Olympic Games and the Los Angeles Sports and Entertainment Commission.

== Book and Press Tour ==
On February 10, 2026, Alan Rothenberg released his book, The Big Bounce: The Surge That Shaped The Future Of U.S. Soccer, in which he recounted his attempts to draw attention to the '94 World Cup, recalling that the average American had no knowledge of the World Cup back then. Through a World Cup Trophy Legacy Tour and a cameo by Robin Williams, Rothenberg attempted to draw a new population of fans. In his memoir, Rothenberg reflected, "[W]e completely changed the way the World Cup was presented to the public."

On his press tour, Rothenberg, looking back on the World Cup, claimed that the tournament was nearly perfect, recalling that reporters struggled to find anything bad to discuss. Moreover, through his memoir and press tour, Rothenberg has repeatedly emphasized that the speedy creation and rise of MLS are directly attributed to the success of the 1994 World Cup. Indeed, many of those involved in the 1994 World Cup organizing committee became general managers of MLS teams.

Ahead of the 2026 World Cup, Rothenberg notes that, unlike the relatively limited relationship President Bill Clinton had with FIFA in the 1990s, the dynamic between President Donald J. Trump and Gianni Infantino is new and unusual. He also reflects that while he was heavily opposed by FIFA for pushing to charge $1,000 tickets for the Rose Bowl final, dynamic pricing has since become normalized and should be expected in the upcoming 2026 World Cup and 2028 LA Olympics.

== Notes ==
Preceded by Antonio Matarrese	FIFA World Cup Chief Organizer; 1994	Succeeded by Fernand Sastre with Michel Platini

Preceded by Werner Fricker	President of the United States Soccer Federation (USSF); 1990–1998	Succeeded by Dr. S. Robert Contiguglia
