= Stephen Negoesco =

Romanian-American soccer player and coach (1925–2019)

Stephen Negoesco Ștefan Negoescu
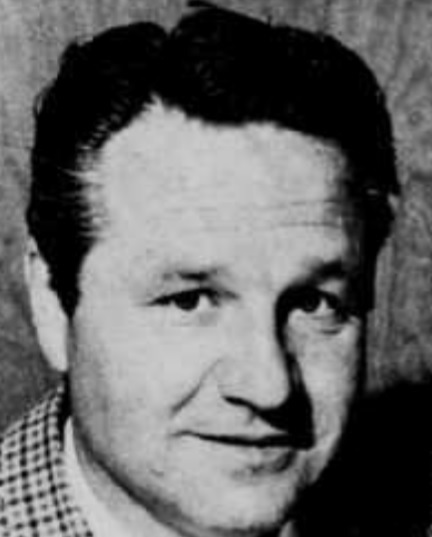
- Negoesco in 1966

Personal information
- Date of birth: September 12, 1925
- Place of birth: New Jersey, United States
- Date of death: February 3, 2019 (aged 93)
- Place of death: San Francisco, California, United States
- Position: Left full-back

Youth career
- 1942–1943: Olympia Bucharest
- 1943–1944: Carmen Bucharest

College career
Years	Team	Apps	(Gls)
1947–1951	San Francisco Dons		

Senior career*
Years	Team	Apps	(Gls)
1944–1945	Sportul Studențesc		
1945–1947	Kearny Scots		
1947–1949	Olympic Club		
1949–1951	Panamerican FC		
1952–1960	Mercury AC		
1960–1961	Hakoah AC		
1961–1962	SF Vikings		

Managerial career
- 1961–1962: SF Vikings (player-coach)
- 1962–2000: San Francisco Dons
- 1963–1977: San Francisco Italian AC
- * Club domestic league appearances and goals

Stephen Negoesco (Romanian: Ștefan Negoescu; September 12, 1925 – February 3, 2019) was a Romanian-American soccer player and coach.

Considered one of college soccer's all-time greatest coaches, he led the University of San Francisco to more than 544 victories, five NCAA championships (the 1978 championship was later vacated because of an ineligible player), and the U.S. Open Cup.

Negoesco was the first coach in college soccer history to reach 500 career wins. He also coached several junior teams and won numerous championships.

He was inducted into The National Soccer Hall of Fame in Oneonta, New York; The West Coast Soccer Hall of Fame; The Bay Area Sports Hall of Fame; The United Soccer Coaches Hall of Fame; The WCC Hall of Honor; as well as receiving numerous awards and commendations. He was known as the "King of West Coast soccer".

His overall career record was 544–172–66.

== Early life and career ==
Born in New Jersey, the son of a sea captain. Negoesco returned with his father to Romania after his mother's death to live with his aunt and uncle, where he discovered and took up soccer. His skills would later help him survive and escape imprisonment by the Nazis during their occupation of Romania during World War II; he was sent to a Nazi camp at 15 after the Germans discovered his American roots. Negoesco played in the Romanian League, then returned to his birthplace in New Jersey in 1945.

Settling in California, Negoesco enrolled at the University of San Francisco in 1947 where he studied biology. He also resumed playing soccer, coached by Gus Donoghue. Negoesco led the Dons to the 1949 California collegiate title and the 1950 Soccer Bowl co-championship with Penn State, and he also earned two All-American honors during this period.

After graduating in 1951, Negoesco taught in the San Francisco Unified School District for twenty-five years. During that period he was also hired as USF's men's soccer coach in 1962, a post he would hold until his retirement in 2000. Negoesco would go on to coach the Dons to 544 victories, 22 conference titles, and five NCAA titles (1966, 1975, 1976, 1978, and 1980), the 1978 championship was later vacated because of an ineligible player.

He made history when he won the US Open Cup championship in 1976 with the San Francisco Italian Athletic Club. It was the first time that a Northern California club lifted the US Open Cup trophy and he became the first coach in history to win a US Open Cup and an NCAA title.

Among the players he mentored were former All-Americans John Doyle, Lothar Osiander, Koulis Apostolidis and Andy Atuegbu, as well as former Peruvian president Alejandro Toledo.

== Retirement and death ==
"He has been a tremendous help to soccer."

— Sigi Schmid Former UCLA and LA Galaxy coach.

After his retirement from coaching men's soccer, Negoesco was inducted to the National Soccer Hall of Fame in 2003, National Soccer Coaches Association of America Hall of Fame in 2003, Bay Area Sports Hall of Fame (BASHOF) in 2010 and the West Coast Conference Hall of Honor (WCC) in 2011.

In 1982, the Negoesco Stadium on the USF campus was named in his honor.

Negoesco died on February 3, 2019, at the age of 93. He was predeceased by his wife Mercedes Coronado. Negoesco is survived by his children Stefan, Sandra, Sonia, Stuart, Sylvana, Sergio, 17 grandchildren and 12 great-grandchildren.

== Honors and awards ==
"USF was the team and Steve was the Coach when I was growing up. It would have been great to have the opportunity to learn from him."

— Bruce Arena Former U.S. Olympic soccer coach.
- 1947–60 Played on many Northern California All Star Teams
- 1948–50 All American at USF; First Team NCAA All-American player on the West Coast
- 1959 Member of University of San Francisco Hall of Fame
- 1961 Key to the City of San Francisco presented by Mayor Christopher
- 1970 Member of the California Soccer Federation North Hall of Fame
- 1977 USF Maraschi Society Award (USF)
- 1982 Negoesco Stadium at USF, dedicated in his honor
- 1983 Commended by California Governor Deukmejian
- 1983 Commended by United States President Ronald Reagan
- 1988 Father William Dunne Award (USF)
- 1993 West Coast Conference Coach of the Year Award
- 1995 Lifetime Member NSCAA
- 1995 NSCAA Commendation
- 1996 NISOA Merit Award
- 2000 West Coast Conference Award
- 2001 San Jose Earthquakes Recognition Award
- 2002 NCAA The Bill Jeffery Award
- 2003 National Soccer Hall of Fame
- 2003 NSCAA Hall of Fame (National Soccer Coaches Association of America)
- 2010 Bay Area Sports Hall of Fame (BASHOF)
- 2011 WCC Hall of Honor (West Coast Conference)

== Publications ==
- Negoesco, Stephen (1992). Soccer. Mcgraw-Hill Humanities. ISBN 978-0-697-10059-7.
