= 1985 National Challenge Cup =

- Dewar Challenge Cup

Tournament details
- Country: United States

Final positions
- Champions: Greek-American A.C. (1st title)
- Runners-up: Kutis SC
- 1986 CONCACAF Champions' Cup: Greek-American A.C.

The 1985 National Challenge Cup was the 71st edition of the USSF's annual open soccer championship. Teams from the North American Soccer League declined to participate.
Greek-American A.C. of San Francisco defeated Kutis SC in the final game. The score was 2–1.
