= United German Hungarians of Philadelphia and Vicinity =

American social club

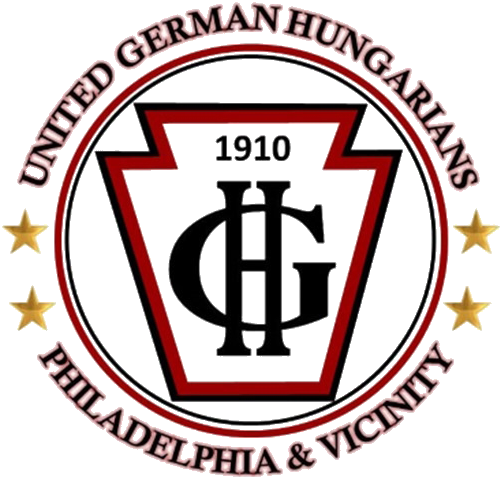
- Abbreviation: GH
- Formation: 1910
- Location: 4666 Bristol Road, Oakford PA 19053
- President: (United States) Bill Galgon
- Main organ: The Monthly Progress
- Affiliations: USASA; Gauverband Nordamerika; Landesverband der Donauschwaben USA
- Website: ughclub.us

United German-Hungarians is an American social club, founded in 1910, as the Banater Männerchor. Although the club has been home to various auxiliary groups, the primary activities of the club remain soccer and cultural dancing. The first team was started in 1922, playing exhibition games only. The current German Hungarian Cultural Group was founded in 1965.

== Representation ==
=== Nomenclature ===
The original name of the organization, the Banater Männerchor, comes from the Hungarian birthplace (Banat) of the founders and many later members. The meaning of the current nomenclature, The United German Hungarians, refers to the fact that Banat Swabians were Germans living in Hungary, and not a union of 'Germans' and 'Hungarians.' Although the hyphen is no longer used, its purpose was to show that these are one people, not a conglomeration of two groups.

=== Shield ===
The shield is the group's logo. The official shield represents the unity of German Hungarians through their traditional values. The "1910" Represents the founding year of the organization. The "keystone," represents the Keystone State of Pennsylvania. Collectively the "stars" represent members of the United German Hungarians and honor their individual and collective accomplishments.

The stars also represent national honors, particularly: US National Soccer Championships in 1965, and 1999 and the Gauverband Nordamerika Preisplatteln Competition Gold Medals in 1999, and 2007.

=== Flag ===
The flag of the German Hungarians was obtained and blessed in 1994. It was purchased from a company in Germany and created according to the specifications of the club. Emily Fricker served as fahnenmutter for the flag.

==== Design ====
The flag's contrasting sides represent the past and present. One side recognizes those who came from the original homelands of central and southeastern Europe. It depicts a fictional village and the common landscapes found in the farming regions of southern Germany, Austria, Hungary, Romania, Slovakia and the Czech Republic. The natural resources, architectural renderings and geographic details evoke life in the old country. The region's common flowers – Kornblumen, Rosmarein, Edelweiss, MohnBlumen and Enzian – complete the circle topped by the flag's motto: "Treu, der Sitte, treu der Tracht, treu der Heimat" ("Faithful to the traditions, faithful to the costume, faithful to the homeland").

The second side of the flag represents members today. Their roots are depicted at the top by a trio of national symbols. Philadelphia is home to the Liberty Bell and Independence Hall, and is where William Penn's "Holy Experiment" began.

==== Other flags ====
- The Banater Männerchor flag

A "flag fund" was begun and members began collecting for the fund. On May 8, 1913 many members and friends celebrated at a festive fahneweihe. The Arbeiter Maennercor served as a "taufpate" and Margaretha Friedrich served as fahnen-mutter.

- Vereinigte Deutsch-Ungarn flag

Little is known about the circumstances that led to the purchase of the Vereinigte Deutsch-Ungarn Flag. This flag was carried proudly for 55 years. It was replaced when the club's name changed in 1939.

== History ==
=== Founding ===
In 1906, a group of nine men from the Banat region of Hungary founded the Banater Arbeiter Verein. They had a choral section (Gesangs-Sektion), which for reasons now unknown, was suspended by the parent organization on November 13, 1910. The suspended section met three days later on November 16 to discuss its future and it decided to form the Banater Maennerchor. A temporary eight man board of directors was appointed for a three-month period. Peter Schock was elected president. August Beuchse was unanimously elected musical director and the first rehearsal was set for November 23, 1910 in Fred Schnabel's "saloon" at Germantown Avenue and Oxford Street. On November 27, 1910, Banater Maennerchor with forty eight members, was accepted as a member by the Vereinigte Arbeiter Gesangverein von Nord Ost Staaten (The United Workers Singing Society of the North-Eastern States). The new organization (Banater) acquired temporary quarters in the hall an Eighth Street and Columbia Avenue, occupied by Maennerchor Rheingold and on December 9, 1910, they held their Founders Day Festival with the Karpathan Saengerbund and the Arbeiter Maennerchor Philadelphia as guest performers.

=== 1910–1930 ===
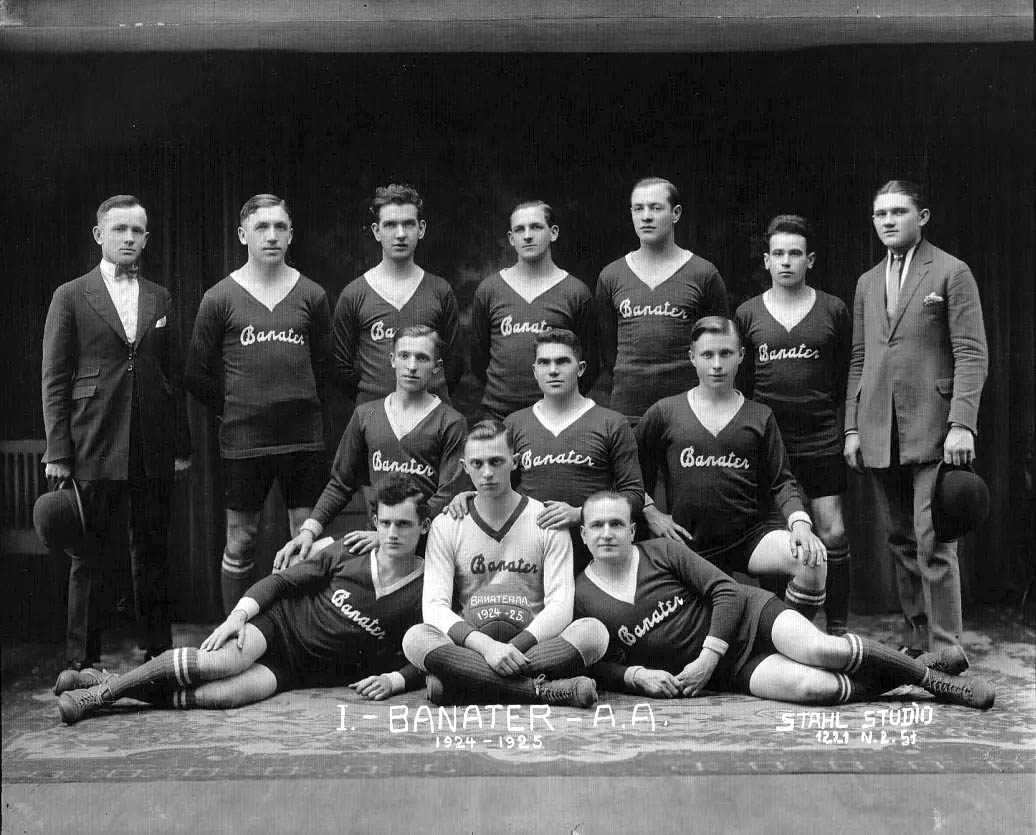
1924–25 Banater A.A. team

From 1910 through October 1939, the organization was called the Banater Männerchor. In 1922, the Bannater Athletic Club was formed and operated under the "mother club." Banater Maennerchor grew swiftly and the final result was that Banater Maennerchor purchased the hall at Eighth and Columbia from Rheingold and also swallowed up its membership. Banater very quickly became the rendezvous for German Hungarians of Philadelphia, and the site at Eighth and Columbia remained their "home" until 1923. In 1911 a school-section was created to teach the children the German language, mathematics, basic sciences, and mechanical drawing for the boys, and sewing and embroidery for the girls. Also, a children's choral group participated in a mass choral festival held at the Old Metropolitan Opera House at Broad and Popular Streets. All instruction was provided freely and willingly by the members of the organization.

In 1912 a female choral group was assembled under the name "Banater Frauen-chor”. On May 8, 1914, amid much fanfare, a "fahnenweihe" of the new club flag was held. The officials of the Arbeiter Maennerchor of Philadelphia served as the godfathers. The flag made its first public appearance in 1914 at the Singersfest of the United Singers of Northeast United States in Baltimore, Maryland. On December 10, 1922, the Banater Athletic Club was organized. In March 1923 the Banater acquired the premises at 2007–13 N. Second Street and the former Columbia Hall became the Banater Maennerchor Hall. A library, was instituted in this period, and had been accumulated over the years. The sport group changed its name from the Banater Athletic Club to German Hungarian Sport Club nine years before the parent group changed its name along similar lines.

=== 1930–1938 ===
In 1930, the "mother club" stood firm as the Banater Männerchor. The sport group changed its name from the Bannater Athletic Club to the German Hungarian Sport Club.

During the early Thirties, having little extra spending money, many people sought entertainment at home, and consequently attendance at social clubs dropped sharply. In some cases this attendance was never regained and organizations disbanded. Banater Maennerchor membership dropped during this period, but club activities continued.

Weekly Singstunde were held. Two bowling alleys were installed in the city clubhouse, and a league was started. In 1932 the club provided several days food and shelter in the clubhouse for a few hundred “hunger marchers" who were passing through Philadelphia on their journey to Washington, D.C.

=== 1938–1959 ===
At a directors meeting on October 2, 1938, it was reported that membership had dwindled. Changing the name of the organization would convince at least 300 members to renew. A motion was carried unanimously that all chartered German-Hungarian clubs in the area be contacted to discuss a general merger.

At a special meeting on June 29, 1939, a committee proposed that all German Hungarians join in one organization to be known as the United German Hungarians of Philadelphia and Vicinity. After a lengthy discussion, the decision was made to join the new organization. At a special general membership meeting on October 24, 1939, it was also decided that Banater Maennerchor would accept the name United German Hungarians of Philadelphia and Vicinity, which has remained since that time.

During the early 1940s, while many of the young men fought in World War II, only the junior section of the sports club was active. Wrestling and weight-lifting groups were formed, and a girls’ section was organized. In 1945, a soccer team, composed mainly of products of the junior section, was placed in the first division of the Philadelphia Soccer League where representation was maintained until 1959, when the organization left this league along with other area clubs and founded the United Soccer League of Pennsylvania.

In January 1946 the first issue of the "Monthly News" (now the “Monthly Progress”) appeared. In May 1946 the German-Hungarian Business Men's Association merged with the United German Hungarians of Philadelphia and Vicinity and the club acquired its current property. Many of the relatives of club members, mostly women, elderly, and children, still living in Banat, were starved and beaten to death in the years after the war (1944–1948). In Romania, the Germans lost their property and means of production without compensation. The "landsleit" (people from the same town) in the U.S.A. contributed material and moral support to their relatives and friends. Many escaped their homelands to Austria and Germany. From there, tens of thousands went abroad, mainly to the U.S. and Canada, while others went to Brazil, Argentina and Australia. Many of these new immigrants joined the club.

The 1950s immigrants brought with them renewed dedication towards success in a changing world. Further development by members of this group together with the existing members led the organization and community to flourish for the ensuing generations.

=== 1960s ===
The 1960s were possibly the club's golden years. In 1961, the property at 2nd and Norris streets was sold and the organization moved to Neshaminy Falls in Oakford, where it resides today. In 1962 work began on a new constitution that was adopted on March 2, 1963. The ground was broken for the current clubhouse on March 28, 1965. On June 27 the soccer team won the National Amateur Soccer Championship and a few weeks later the team won its fifth successive championship in the United Soccer League of Pennsylvania.

On January 29, 1966, the new building formally opened.

In 1968 Werner Fricker became president, succeeding Frank Kirsch. Fricker had been involved in many of the club's projects (in addition to captaining the National Amateur Championship soccer team) and the club acquired an additional six acres of adjoining ground for future development.

=== 1970s ===
In 1971 the major soccer team won the Eastern United States Amateur Championship and the youth soccer program won many awards and trophies. In 1972 the club celebrated "Fifty Years in Sports and Soccer”.

In 1973 the club chartered a plane to Germany with approximately 150 people planned for this trip. In the same period, a fire destroyed the clubhouse. It was rebuilt and opened in on May 5, 1973.

In 1975 the club formed its first girls soccer team.

In 1977 the major team reached the finals of the National Challenge Cup and the U.S. National Amateur Cup competitions and the reserve team won their first championship of the United Soccer League of Pennsylvania.

The club's first annual three-day Kirchweihfest was held in September 1978.

=== Soccer history ===
On December 10, 1922, the Banater Männerchor social club formed the Banater Athletic Club which included several sports, with soccer as the main emphasis. The original soccer team, which played only exhibition games during its first season, consisted of Mayersfeld, Ehing, Striefter, Halper, Kaitor, John Hof, Schnieider, Sadler, Koeller, Schuster and Gehweiler. The team entered the Football Association of Eastern Pennsylvania and District and in the fall of 1923, they joined the Allied League Third Division. By this time, the club had over 400 members and a reserve team was formed. In 1926, the club purchased land on the corner of Frankford Avenue and Robbins Street for home games. The club played its first game away from Philadelphia with the Baltimore Kickers.

In 1927 the first team entered the Second Division of the National Soccer League of Philadelphia, earning promotion to the First Division in 1928. In 1930, the team became known as the German-Hungarians. In 1932, the first team moved up to the Pennsylvania League. In 1936, the club formed a third team which entered the Philadelphia Workers League and three years later a youth system was established which tended to compete against the Lighthouse Boys Club. In 1939, the team changed its name to The United German Hungarians of Philadelphia and Vicinity, better known as the United German-Hungarians. World War II caused a significant decline in the club's fortunes which persisted into the 1950s.

In 1954, Werner Fricker joined the club, playing for fifteen years in addition to filling several administrative positions. In 1959, the club was instrumental in forming the United Soccer League of Philadelphia which operated as an "outlaw" league until 1962. The league attracted several top Philadelphia teams despite the refusal of the United States Football Federation to recognize it. The German-Hungarians finished second in 1960, then won six consecutive championships. In 1965, the club purchased a facility in Oakford, Pennsylvania, where it has since played its home games. That year, the team won the 1965 National Amateur Cup. The German-Hungarians also finished second in the 1977 and 1993 U.S. Open Cups.

== Grounds ==
=== United German Hungarian Club – Bristol Road, Oakford PA ===
The property in Oakford has had two clubhouses: "The Shack" and the main clubhouse. The club acquired this property in May 1946, when the "German-Hungarian Business Men's Association" (a group of members of the Banater Maennerchor, who were engaged in private enterprise, acquired this land in 1933) decided to merge and turned over its assets. In the period between 1946 and 1963, the club operated two clubhouses, and this one was often referred to as the "Summer Club". In 1963 when the City Club was sold, the Oakford property was improved, becoming the club's primary location.

On March 28, 1965, the ground for the new clubhouse was broken by President Frank Kirsch. In January 1966 the new building opened.

On February 3, 1973, the clubhouse caught fire, destroying most of the inside of the building. The members rebuilt it by hand and on May 5, 1973, the building was open again.

==== Fields ====
The club owns and operates four full size soccer fields where the club has hosted the National Youth Cups Finals in 1988, the US National Cup Finals in 1989, 1994, 2000, 2002, & 2010, and the 2011 US National Danube Swabian Soccer Tournament. In 1993 the facilities hosted the Germany women's national football team and the world champion United States women's national soccer team. The German women's team was based at the club for several days in April, of 1993. They trained on the fields and the club staff handled their catering needs.

Field 1
- 1
- Interactive map of Field 1
- Full name: United German Hungarian's Field 1
- Location: 4666 Bristol Road, Oakford, PA 19053
- Coordinates: 40.150995°N 74.966173°W
- Operator: GH Groundhogs
- Capacity: 2,000
- Surface: grass
- Scoreboard: yes

Construction
- Built: 1946
- Renovated: 1963, 1989

==== Stadium ====
The stadium field is the home field of the major team. The field was built in 1946, when the property was acquired. In 1963, new seating and lights were added. Renovations were completed in 1989, adding more seating, a new roof at the grandstand, as well as a scoreboard, fencing, lighting and irrigation systems. The 1965 National Amateur Championship game was played on this field. The stadium has hosted various international teams including the United States men's national soccer team and the Malta national football team in their preparation for the 1990 FIFA World Cup and in 2011 the club hosted the National Danube Swabian Soccer Tournament.

From 1975 to 1981 the club's most important traditional event, "The German Hungarian Kirchweihfest", took place in the stadium. In July 1994 the fahneweihe for the club's new flag was held there and included close to 1000 participants. In 2010, the club hosted the 2010 Landestreffen der Donauschwaben USA und Kanada, and the parade was held on the field. Over 16 dance groups from across the United States and Canada performed a friendship dance together in the stadium.

=== Previous locations ===
==== Maennerchor Rheingold – Eighth Street and Columbia Avenue ====
In 1910 The Banater Maennerchor acquired temporary quarters in the hall at Eighth Street and Columbia, in Philadelphia. The Banater Maennerchor purchased the hall from the Rheingold.

==== Banater Maennerchor Hall – Second and Norris Streets ====
In March 1923 the Banater Maennerchor purchased the hall at this location, and the former Columbia Hall became the Banater Maennerchor Hall. In the period between 1946 and 1963, the club operated two clubhouses, and this one was often referred to as the "City Club". It was sold in 1962.

== Publications ==
The first issue of the club newsletter, the "Monthly News" (now the “Monthly Progress”), appeared in January 1946. In 2001 the website was launched.

== Notable events ==
As a social club, the GH has always held public and private events. Annual traveling events have been run over the years by the GH's umbrella organizations.

=== Local events ===
==== Kirchweihfest ====
The kirchweih is the "most important traditional German Hungarian event" and is the club's oldest tradition and its main festival. German Hungarians brought this tradition with them from Germany to Banat and then to the United States. The name translates as a "church consecration". The kirchweih, is a celebration of the harvest and of the people in the community. It is an event that involves girls in German costumes, boys in flowered hats, and traditional vests. Music, dancing and food are a central feature. Every year the kirchweih group march in unison, led by the geld herr who along with his partner, carry the "Rosmarein Strauss". The men make speeches describing the homeland and its traditions. In the modern era, this event has become more important. It has become an event of remembering and pride. Many of the older women prepare the tracht for their granddaughters to wear. The men are taught speeches from their fathers and grandfathers.

Before the 1965 formation of the cultural group, the club celebrated multiple kirchweihs each year. Many were based on the specific traditions of individual Banat towns. With the formation of the sport club dance group, kirchweihs were often celebrated and run by this group. Sometime after the sport club formation and the cultural group formation, the many kirchweihs were combined into one September event.

In September, 1974, the club initiated their first three-day Kirchweihfest. In 2002 the Kirchweihfest was held on a single day in the picnic grove and in 2006, the Kirchweihfest moved from September to November and from an outside event to an inside one.

==== Oktoberfest ====
The club has been hosting an Oktoberfest since 2002, when they welcomed the Bayerischer Volksfest Verein into their home. The BVV brought with them the tradition of this event that they originated in 1878. The two clubs have since jointly hosted it on club grounds. It coincides with the Philadelphia German American Steuben day parade. Bands from Germany, local German American Bands, club dancers and guest dancers and others perform during these festivals.

==== Fahnenweihe – 1994 ====
In July 1994, the GH celebrated the adoption of a new flag. This flag is the club's third, and current flag. The event took place over three days, and included over 1000 people. Guests at this Fahnenweihe included clubs from Pennsylvania, Connecticut, New York, New Jersey, Ohio, Delaware, Maryland, Michigan, Minnesota, Rhode Island, Washington D.C., Ontario and Quebec. The band and 18 guests traveled from Germany.

=== Traveling events ===
==== 19. Gaufest – 2003 ====
In May 2003, the United German Hungarians hosted the 19. Gaufest at the Loews Hotel in Philadelphia. The Gaufest is a schuhplattler competition of the Gauverband Nordamerika.

==== Landestreffen Der Donauschwaben – 2010 ====
The Landestreffen Der Donauschwaben USA Und Kanada 2010, an annual national celebration dedicated to preserving the cultural heritage of the Danube Swabian Peoples, was held in 2010. The Donauschwaben people as well as the German Hungarian people are the descendants of German ethnics who emigrated from the German lands to the Danubian Plains of Hungary in the late seventeen and eighteen hundreds. The hall and tents were filled to capacity.

=== Soccer events ===
The club has hosted numerous national soccer competitions. It hosted the USASA National Soccer Cup Finals in 1989, 1994, 2000, 2002 and 2010. The National Youth Cup Finals were there in 1988. The US National Danube Swabian Cup took place at the club in 2011.

==== Anniversaries of sport and soccer ====
The club traces its history of sport back to 1922, when the Banater Athletic club began. Therefore, the 50th anniversary of sport and soccer was in 1972, the 75th anniversary in 1997, and the 100th will be in 2022.

== Soccer ==
United German Hungarians
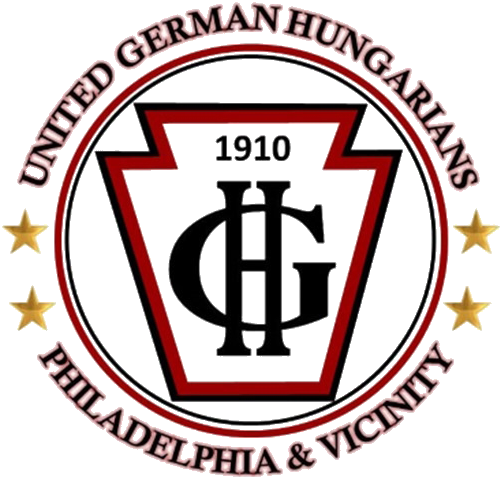
- Full name: United German Hungarians of Philadelphia and Vicinity
- Nickname: UGH
- Founded: 1925; 101 years ago
- Coach: Steve Paul
- League: Tri-County WSL
- 2025: ?
Home colours

As of December 2025, United German Hungarians fields an adult women's soccer team that competes in the Tri-County Women's Soccer League.

The club first soccer team dates back to 1925.

=== History ===
==== League play ====
In 1923, the club entered the third division of the Allied League. The first team was moved into the second division of the National League in 1927. This team achieved success that year with a first-half-title and were undefeated. In 1928 GH moved into the first division of the National League, and in 1932 won the First Division Championship.

In 1933 the first team entered the Pennsylvania League, considered one of the nation's strongest amateur soccer leagues. In 1945 the first team entered the first division of the Philadelphia Soccer League. In 1959 United Soccer League of Pennsylvania was formed with the German Hungarians as a founding member. In 1996 the German Hungarians transferred from the USLofPA to the Inter-County Soccer League, due to the declining size of the league that they had helped found in 1959. In intercounty the GH played in the Ultra division. The German Hungarians were Champions of this division twice, in 1996 and 1997. Sometime in the 2000s the GH returned to the United League, were the team still plays today.

===== United Soccer League of Pennsylvania =====
In 1959 United Soccer League of Pennsylvania was formed with the German Hungarians as a founding member. Club member Frank Follmer became the league's first President. The first team in 1959 became the German Hungarian Major Team based on the title of the division of the league. In the first year the major team lost the championship by one point, but went on to become champions for the following six years. Since the league's 1959 founding, the German Hungarians have won the major division title 16 times, making them the league's winningest team. Over their years of involvement in the USLofPA many members of the German Hungarians have been involved in running the league.

The founding club members were Follmer, John Piatka, John Weber and Werner Fricker. Club members who became league president were Follmer, Fricker, Helmut Schurer and John Koschewitz.

=== National titles ===
The German Hungarians won two national titles, The 1965 Amateur Cup, and the 1999 USASA Open Cup. The GH were National Amateur Cup finalists 4 times in 1964, 1970, 1977, 1999, and US Open cup finalists twice (1977, 1994).

==== 1965 US National Amateur Cup ====
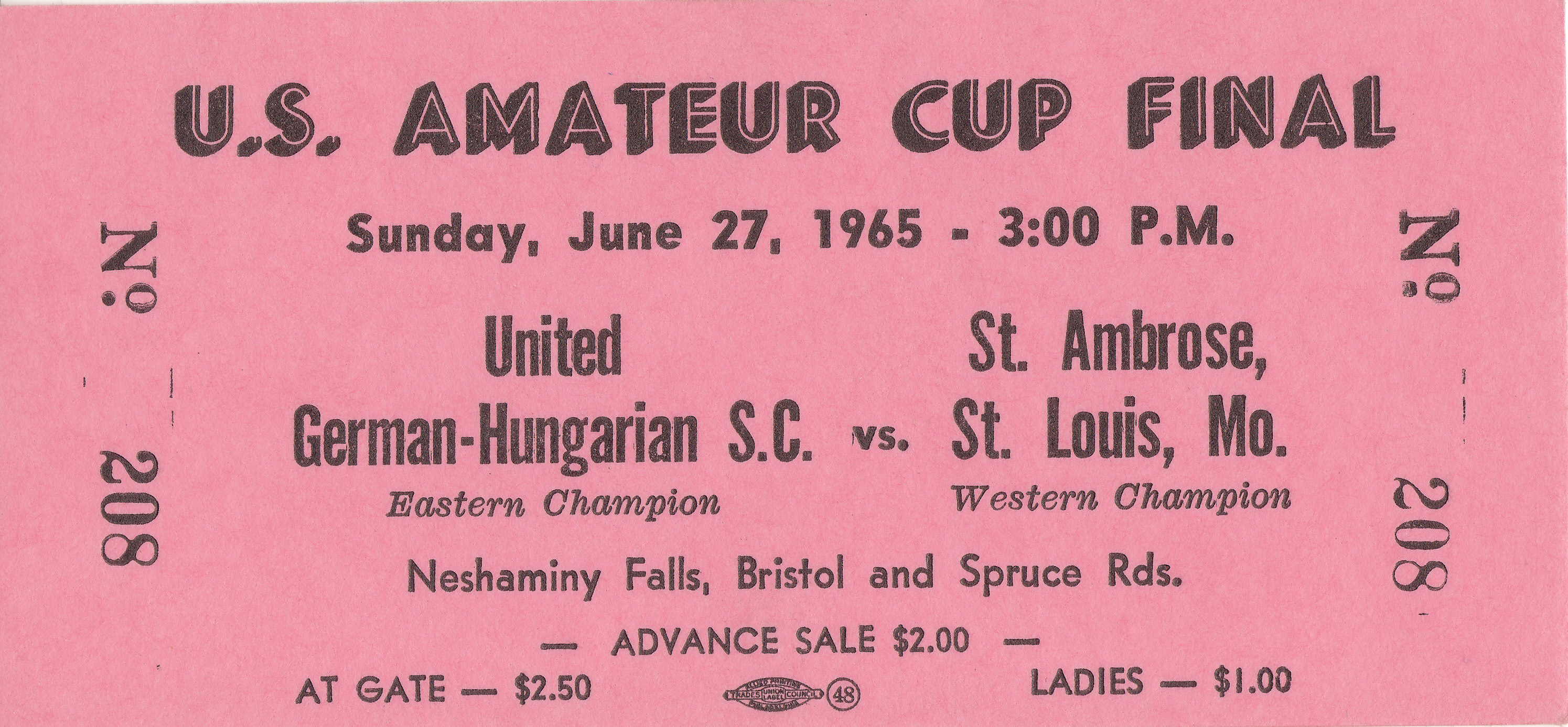
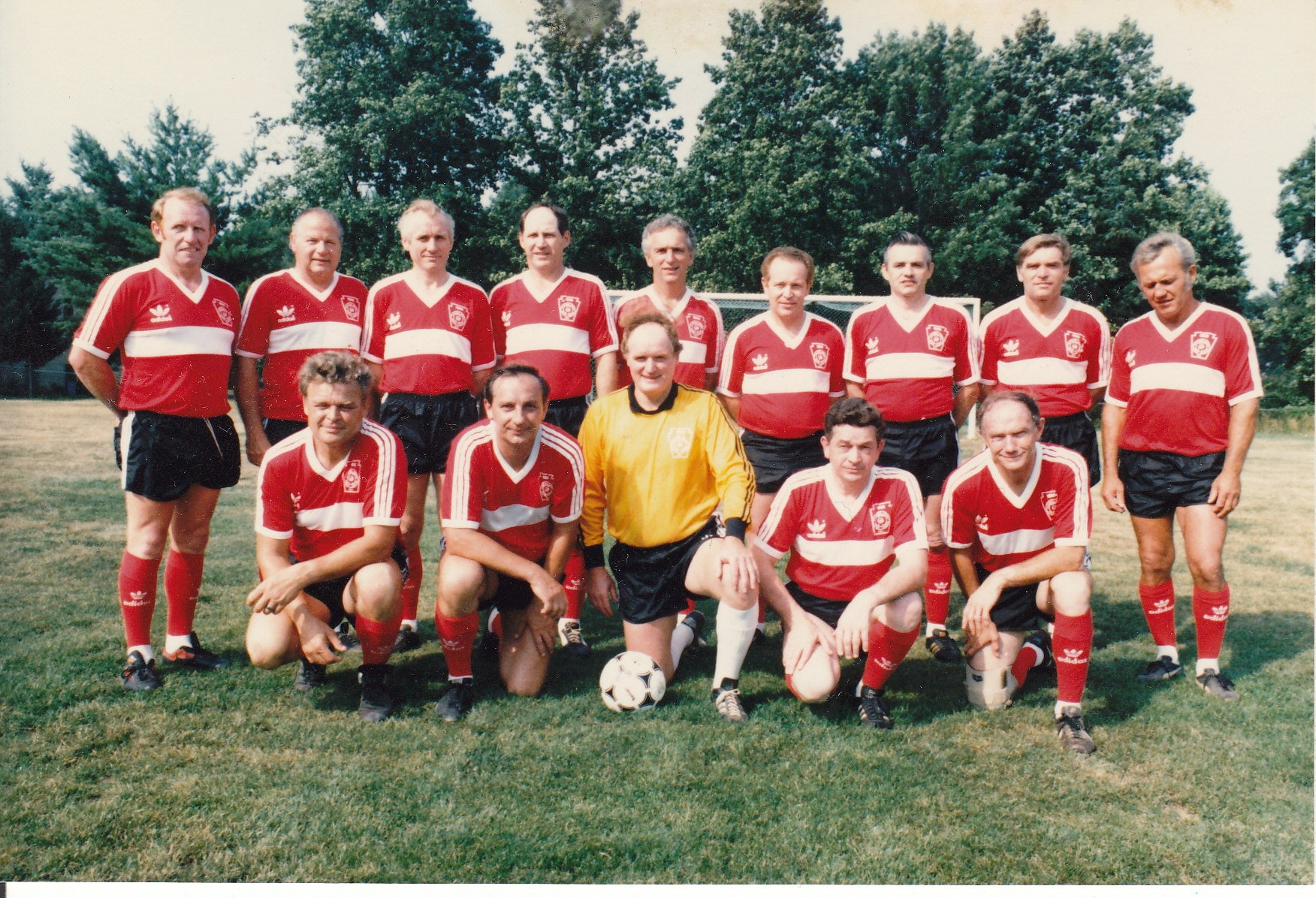
(left): Ticket from the 1965 Amateur Cup Final, in Oakford, PA; (right): Reunion of the 1965 Amateur Championship team in 1985

On June 27, 1965, the German Hungarians won the US National Amateur Cup with a resounding victory over St. Ambrose of St. Louis 6–0 in Oakford. The Game attracted an enthusiastic overflow crowd of spectators, and the final result touched off a celebration which rocked the area. Over 1000 tickets were sold by the home club. The German Hungarians were dressed, in red uniforms, with black shorts, and red socks, and the away team wore white uniforms with black shorts and white socks. The match kicked off at 3:00 PM, and at half time, the German Hungarians were ahead 5–0.

Although the Mound City boys were outclassed, and the issue was never in doubt after the first few minutes, the “Saints” refused to give up and they played hard and clean soccer, right down to the wire. The play on the part of both teams made it an assignment for referee Buck Davidson, of Washington, D.C., and linesman, Al Heery and Bill Rose of Philadelphia.

Ted Kereczmann opened the proceedings and introduced the players as they entered between columns of the junior dancers and soccer players. Marlene Fricker, escorted by Billy Galgon and Richard Heck, presented a bouquet to the visiting captain, Jim Murphy, a member of the United States Pan-American team in 1957, and the two captains exchanged club pennants. Kereczmann then introduced dignitaries: Bob Goulker, St. Louis University soccer coach and Second Vice President of the USSFA; Gene Edwards, Chairman of the USSFA Amateur Cup Competition; Frank Marcus, Wisconsin Cup Commissioner; Helmut Schurer, chairman, E.P. &D.; John Weber, First Vice President, E.P. &D.; Carl Schmollinger, Representative, E.P. &D.; Frank Follmer, President, United Soccer League of Penna.; John Piatka, Games Commissioner for United Soccer League of Penna.; Bill Share, President Referees Association.; Bob White, President Soccer old-timers Association; Charlie Colombo, Coach of the Saint Ambrose Team, who played center half for the United States World Cup Team which upset England 1:0 in 1950; and Frank Kirsch, President United German Hungarians of Philadelphia.

After the formalities and the national anthem, the game was quickly put on ice by Heinz Guckert, who scored in less than 20 seconds. The team put up four more in the first half, leading to early celebrations by the crowd. Guckert also got the second, Arthur Jethon (3rd & 4th), Peter Piskei (5th) and Joe Hutfluss (6th on a penalty kick).

GH's 1965 Roster"

1. Dave Wilson, GK
2. Al Nothum, LFB
3. Hank McVeigh, LFB
4. Bill Wilkinson (soccer), RHB
5. Klaus Gehlert, CHB
6. Werner Fricker, LHB (c)
7. Peter Piskei, IR
8. Otto Brand, IL
9. Heinz Guckert, CF
10. Henry Wagner, IL
11. Arthur Jethon, OL
. Joe Walls, RFB
. Joe Hutfluss, OL
. Frank Plescha, HB
Jack Dunn, Player Coach
Henry Birkenheuer, Manager

1965 Amateur Cup Champions Photo Archive

==== 1999 USASA Open Cup ====
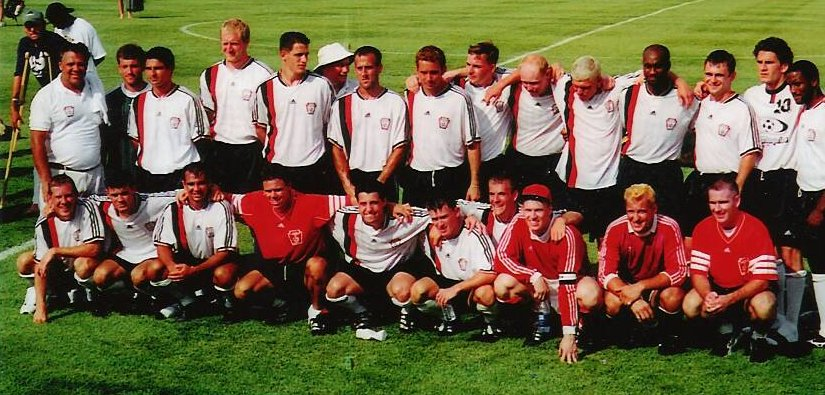
The 1999 USASA Open Cup champions: Claudio Tovaruella, Assistant Manager, Jim Kaz, Rich Million, Josh Viel, Alex Peev, Bill Wilkinson, Assistant Coach, Kurt Schmidt, Ed Woehlcke, Marc Eckert, Bob Wilkinson, Head Coach and Player, Pat Morris, Harold Ivery, Dan Ryan, Pat McCallion, Andy Barret. (kneeling) Terry Malone, Bob Hennes, Joe Veneziale, Cecido Colasante, Dan Murtaugh, Dave Steinbach, Ray DeStephanis, Paul Centofanti, captain Chris Bohn, Michael Curley. (missing) Werner Fricker Jr., manager

On July 17, 1999, in St. Louis Missouri, The German Hungarians won their second National Title defeating the Milwaukee Bavarians SC 2–1, in the USASA Open Cup. GH traveled to St. Louis and played 4 games in that weekend in two different cups on July 16–18. A group of about fifty, including players, their families, club officials and fans made the journey.

On Friday July 16 GH played against Los Lobos, Oklahoma, in the Open Semi-final, winning 7 to 2. Goals for the GH were scored by Cesido Colasante (6 minutes), Ray DeStephanis (15 Minutes), Pat McCallion (41 minutes), Terry Malone (43 minutes), Pat Morris (51 minutes), and Dan Murtaugh (72 minutes). The final was against the Milwaukee Bavarians SC whom they beat 2 to 1. Goals were scored by Pat Morris (8 minutes), & Ray DeStephanis (14 minutes).

- 1999 Amateur Cup Finalist
GH played in the Amateur Cup Semi-Final at 5 pm on Friday July 16. They defeated the Florida McCormick Kickers with a score of 3 to 2. Goals were scored for GH by Dave Steinbach (5 minutes, 16 minutes), Ray DeStephanis (65 minutes). After winning the Open Cup on Saturday the team, played in the Amateur cup final on Sunday. As the game progressed it was obvious that both teams were pretty evenly matched. With 30 seconds left in game time GH tied to end 4 to 4. Unfortunately they lost 7 to 5 in overtime. That still left us Runner Up to the U.S. Amateur Cup. Goals were scored by Alex Peev (34 minutes), Robert Henes (43 minutes, 93 minutes), Cesido Colasante (52 minutes), Ray DeStephanis (OT 14 minutes).

GH's 1999 Roster

- Ray DeStephanis
- Terry Malone
- Dave Steinbach
- Cecido Colasante
- Dan Murtaugh
- Chris Bohn
- Joe Veniziale
- Bob Hennes
- Mike Curley
- Kurt Schmidt
- Josh Viel
- Rich Million
- Pat Morris
- Ed Woehlcke
- Pat McCallion
- Marc Eckert
- Alex Peev
- Dan Ryan
- Harold Ivory
- Andy Barrett
- Jim Kaz
- Paul Centofanti, Captain

- Bob Wilkinson, Player/ Head Coach
- Claudio Tovaruella, Assistant Coach
- William Wilkinson, Assistant Coach
- Werner Fricker Jr., Manager

=== Colors ===
The current colors of the UGH team are white and black. In past years, the German Hungarians' colors were red and black, usually with white accents. It is believed that these colors were chosen by Ted Kereczmann, based on his club team in Hungary. The team usually has a kit that consists of a red shirt, black shorts and red socks, and an alternate kit that consists of a white shirt, black shorts and white socks.

Over the years there have been times when black socks were worn with both sets. In the early years the uniforms were hand-sewn and the shorts and socks purchased. In the late eighties, the club began wearing Adidas uniforms.

=== Adult soccer achievements ===
- National Amateur Cup Champions: 1—1965
- National Amateur Cup Finalists: 4—1964, 1970, 1977, 1999
- National Amateur Cup Region I Champions: 2–1994, 1999
- National Amateur Cup Region I Finalists: 4–1964, 1970, 1977, 1990, 1992, 1999
- USASA Open Cup Champions: 1—https://web.archive.org/web/20121110021701/https://picasaweb.google.com/ugharchiving1/EmilyFrickerCollection#5448585922932104562 1999]
- USASA Open Cup Region I Champions: 1—1999
- National Challenge Cup Finalists: 2–1977, 1993
- National Challenge Cup Region I Champions: 2–1977, 1993
- U.S. Open Cup Region I Finalists: 1—1990
- East PA State Champions Cup Winner: 1—1999
- Danube Swabian USA Cup Champions: 2—1990,2011
- United Soccer League of Pennsylvania Champions: 16—1961, 1962, 1963, 1964, 1965, 1966, 1968, 1969, 1971, 1972, 1973, 1978, 1990, 1992, 1993, 2010
- United Soccer League of Pennsylvania Reserve Division Champions: 9–1972, 1977, 1978, 1983, 1987, 1988, 1990, 1991, 1993
- United Soccer League of Pennsylvania First Division Champions: 1—1963
- Intercounty Soccer League Ultra Division Champions: 2–1996, 1997
- Intercounty Soccer League Women's Division Champions: 11–1984, 1985, 1986, 1987, 1990, 1993, 1994, 1995, 1996, 1997, 1998
- United Soccer League of Pennsylvania Women's Champions—2011, 2012, 2013
- East PA Women's Cup Champions: 11–1985, 1988, 1989, 1992, 1993, 1994, 1995, 1996, 1997, 1998, 1999, 2011
- US Women's Amateur Finalist: 1—1999

=== Notable players ===
German Hungarians who have represented the United States of America on National, Olympic, Pan Am, Armed Services, and National Futsal Teams.

- Walter Bahr
- Jack Dunn (soccer)
- Alex Ely
- Arthur Jethon
- Werner Fricker
- Bob Watson
- Otto Brand
- Heinz Guckert
- Adam Piskei
- Bill Wilkinson (soccer)
- Casey Bahr
- Chris Bahr
- Dave MacWilliams
- Steve Rammel
- Peter Vermes
- Pat Morris
- Ptah Myers
- David Castellanos
- Jeremy Ortiz

== Dancing and culture ==
The club has been a cultural center since the founding of a Maennerchor and singing group. Most traditional dancing began in the 1930s.

=== Sport club dance group ===
In the days of the German Hungarian Sport Club, a sport club dance group performed. Many soccer players were also members of the dance group. The dance group always oerfirned a czardas at the Stiftungsfest. Kirchweihs were always part of the group's repertoire. Many of the dances, events and traditions started by this group continue today.

=== Cultural group ===
In 1964 Emily Fricker, Emma Mueller and Antonia Kreutzer started a children's dance group in which they would foster the continuance of the traditional and folk dances of their ethnic group. They performed Viennese waltzes, Hungarian czardas, contemporary dances and schuhplattler dancing. The Hungarian czardas, were group favorites. The dancers were grouped by age into children's, junior, and teen groups, while adults mainly performed schuhplattlers. In addition to performing at many club events, they often participate in the annual event held by the Landesverband Der Donauschwaben USA. The cultural group performs annually at the Anniversary Banquet of the mother club, as well as the Austrian Heuriger.

German Hungarian Schuhplattler Group
- Purpose: to perform Bavarian Schuhplattler Dances
- Inaugurated: 1976
- Headquarters: 4666 Bristol Road, Oakford, PA 19053
- Website: GH SCHUHPLATTLER GROUP

=== Schuhplattler group ===
In the late 1960s the cultural group began performing schuhplattler dances under the direction of Andy Weyershaeuser. The schuhplattler group was formed in 1976. Since that time the group has performed at various events along the East Coast. They attended their first Gaufest in Denver. In 1988, the club was accepted as a member of the Gauverband Nordamerika, Inc. an organization which preserves and perpetuates Bavarian and Tyrolean folk dancing, tracht, customs and culture. This umbrella organization has held annual gaufests since 1967.

The German Hungarians have participated since 1985. In 1999 at the 17th meeting in St. Paul, Minnesota, the German Hungarians placed "First in Group Prize Plattling". The group is especially proud because they are not of Bavarian or Tyrolean heritage, and they won a Bavarian style competition. In 2003, the group hosted the 19th Gaufest in Philadelphia. They placed second in "Group Prize Plattling" in 2003, leading to an invitation to perform in Germany. The German Hungarians placed fifth in Ingolstadt, in Bavaria. In 2007 at the 20th Gaufest the group once again placed First in "Group Prize Plattling". In addition to this win, Sasha and Janet Malofiy placed First in the "Einzelplattler" competition. After the 2007 win, the group again competed in Germany, placing sixth.

==== Schuhplattler achievements ====
Bayerischen Löwen

- Ingolstadt, Bavaria, Germany – 2003: 5th
- Planegg, Munich, Germany – 2008: 6th

Chronology of group's Gaufest attendance

- Denver, Colorado – 1985: observers
- Milwaukee, Wisconsin – 1987: performed an "Ehrentanz"
- Parsippany, New Jersey – 1989: 14th
- Vancouver, British Columbia, Canada – 1991: 6th
- Buffalo, New York – 1993: 3rd
- Milwaukee, Wisconsin – 1995: 3rd
- Newark, Delaware – 1997: 3rd
- St. Paul, Minnesota – 1999: 1st
- Ellenville, New York – 2001: 4th
- *Philadelphia, Pennsylvania – 2003: 2nd
- Buffalo, New York – 2005: 7th
- Hershey, Pennsylvania – 2007: 1st. Also 1st Place in the Adult Einzelplattler (age group 16–34)
- Toledo, Ohio – 2009: 5th
- Orlando, Florida – 2011: 8th
(*the club hosted this gaufest)
