= Greek-American A.C. =

Greek American
- Full name: San Francisco Greek-American Athletic Club
- Nickname: Greek-Americans
- Founded: 1949
- Dissolved: 2005
- Stadium: Boxer Stadium
- League: San Francisco Soccer Football League

Greek-American Athletic Club was a semi-professional soccer club from San Francisco, California that played in the San Francisco Soccer Football League. They are the most successful team in Francisco Soccer Football League's history with 16 titles to their credit. In its 56 year history, Greek-American AC advanced to the US Open Cup Final three times, winning in 1985 and 1994. The club first reached the Open Cup Quarterfinals in 1963 and over the next three decades would finish with 12 Round of 8 appearances, which remains tied for the third-most in tournament's history.

== History ==
=== Early years ===
The team was founded in 1949 by brothers Jim and John Rally. Under the auspices of the Greek Orthodox Church of Annunciation, it was at that time entered in the Alliance(Reserve) Division of the SFSFL under the name 'Pan-Hellenes', for two disappointing seasons with a record of five wins and twenty three losses. Being an independent team, it was admitted to the league's Second Division for the 1950–51 season as the team came under the auspices of the Greek-American Youth Club, a social club to which most of the players belonged and was renamed Greek-Americans. Within two years, the Greek-Americans became the cinderella team of the year, winning the championship and promotion to the league's top division, the First Division. This feat was accomplished due to the superlative playing skills of Mike Nicolas, a then recent arrival from Cyprus, who trained the team prior to the start of the season and led the Greek-Americans to the championship by personally scoring 43 goals in 14 league games. The following season, however, the competition in the First Division proved to be too much for the inexperienced Greek-Americans, as the team finished last and was demoted down to the Second Division, where it was in contention for the next two seasons, finishing third and second on each occasion. In the 1957–58 season, they once again won the title in a dramatic play-off against the SSF Scots. The team's second attempt in the top division fared better than the first as the team finished seventh with twelve points, league rules requiring it to defend its First Division berth in a play-off game against challenger Club Peru from the Second Division. The speedy and technically superior Peruvians defeated the Greek-Americans who were once again obliged to return to the lower division.

=== Promotion ===
It was after this second failure to remain in the top division that the Directors of the club resolved to rebuild the team with new talent by recruiting and importing top players to its ranks. As a result of these efforts, John Davidson a world cup pick and Bob Hughes, two outstanding Scottish players were recruited from Canada, and along with Mike Nicolas were instrumental for the team's excellent showing in the 1959–60 season, winning eleven games while losing only one. Yet, at the end of the season, the team finished in a tie with the San Francisco Athletic Club. After many postponements, the highly favored Greek-Americans lost the play-off to their Italian adversaries and a second play-off to First Division seventh place finisher AAC Teutonia and were forced to remain in the Second Division, as it turned out for the last time, for with the addition of more players, like George Cruickshank, the team won its third Second Division championship in 1960–61 without suffering a single defeat.

=== Decades of dominance ===
Since that time the team has remained in the top division for over forty years, a period of longevity unequalled by any other team. The Greeks first challenged the supremacy of the Scots in the Open Cup, defeating them twice in three seasons; but they had to wait until 1966–67 to lift their first SFSFL title. After another breakthrough season, the Greeks went on to become the most dominant team in the history of the league, amassing a staggering 53 trophies. During one period between 1986 and 1989, the Greeks were undefeated in 55 consecutive games and won five straight league titles from 1984 to 1989. Under former U.S. national team coach Lothar Osiander the team won two U.S. Open Cups in 1985 and 1994.

=== The 1997 fire ===
Tragedy struck in 1997, when a massive fire broke out at an industrial laundromat managed by John Rally. The fire destroyed much of the memorabilia and trophies that the brothers had acquired through their many decades of patronage. All that was left was only the memories of glory.

== Milestones ==
- 1949: Founded as San Francisco Pan-Hellenes
- 1949-1950: Started playing in "Alliance" division of SFSFL
- 1950: Club renamed to San Francisco Greek-Americans
- 1950-1952: Played in second division of SFSFL, gained promotion in 1952
- 1952-53: That was its first season in first division, but relegated
- 1953-1958: Second division, gained promotion in 1958
- 1958-59: First division, but relegated
- 1959-1961: Second division
- 1961-2005: First division, until the club was dissolved in 2005
- 2015: Death of the co-founder and owner Jim Rally at the age of 85
- 2019: Death of the co-founder and owner John Rally at the age of 90

== Honors ==
- San Francisco Soccer Football League
  - Champions (16): 1966–67, 1968–69, 1969–70, 1970–71, 1972–73, 1977–78, 1980–81, 1982–83, 1984–85, 1985–86, 1986–87, 1987–88, 1988–89, 1990–91, 1993–94, 1994–95
  - Second Division Champions (3): 1952–53, 1957–58, 1960–61
- California State Cup (soccer)
  - Champions (5): 1965–66, 1968–69, 1979–80, 1982–83, 1985–86
  - Junior Champions (1): 1968–69
- U.S. Open Cup
  - Champions (2): 1994, 1985
- U.S. National Cup
  - USASA National Cup OVER 30 Champions (2): 1996, 1998
- USASA Soccer Fest
  - USASA Veterans Cup OVER 40 Champions (1): 2004
- Las Vegas Silver Mug
  - Tournament Champions (3): 1993, 1994, 1995
- Participations in CONCACAF Champions' Cup: 1989

== U.S. Open Cup Finals ==
- 1985: Greek-American A.C. - St. Louis Kutis SC 2-1
- 1988: St. Louis Busch Seniors - Greek-American A.C. 1-1, aet 1-2
- 1994: Greek-American A.C. - Bavarian Leinenkugel 3-0 (Derek Van Rheenen 56΄, Mike Deleray 61΄, 81΄)

== Notable players ==
- Alex Basso
- Andy Atuegbu
- Godwin Odiye
- Salvador Bernardez
- Esmaeil Haj Rahimipour
- John Doyle
- Paul Bravo
- Mark Semioli
- Tim Martin
- Dominic Kinnear
- Johnny Moore
