= 1976 Tampa Bay Rowdies season =

Tampa Bay Rowdies
1976 season
- Owner: (United States) George W. Strawbridge, Jr.
- General manager: (United States) Beau Rodgers
- Head coach: (Italy) Eddie Firmani
- Stadium: Tampa Stadium
- NASL: Division: 1st Overall: 1st Playoffs: Conference finals
- U.S. Open Cup: Did not enter
- Top goalscorer: (South Africa) Derek Smethurst (20 goals)
- Highest home attendance: 42,611 (June 6 v. New York)
- Lowest home attendance: 7,276 (June 23 v. Rochester)
- Average home league attendance: 16,452
Home colors	Away colors

The 1976 season was the original Tampa Bay Rowdies second season of existence, and their second season in the North American Soccer League, the top division of soccer in the United States and Canada at that time. Tampa Bay entered the season as the defending Soccer Bowl champions.

== Overview ==
The defense of the Rowdies' NASL title began with the club going on a four-match preseason tour of Haiti. After winning the 1976 indoor tournament, the team later played two addition preseason games against the San Antonio Thunder at high schools in the Tampa Bay Area. The mercurial English star, Rodney Marsh was introduced as team captain on April 22, but resigned the post after just eleven days, handing the job to fellow Englishman, Tommy Smith. In the NASL season, the Rowdies finished with a league-best record of 18–6, which placed them first in the Eastern Division of the Atlantic Conference. As regular season champions, they qualified for the playoffs with home field advantage throughout. In an upset, they fell to Toronto Metros-Croatia, 0–2, in the conference finals. Toronto went on to win the Soccer Bowl. For the second consecutive season South African striker, Derek Smethurst was the club leader in scoring with 20 goals, a total which also led the league.

== Club ==
=== Roster ===
No.	Position	Nation	Player
1	GK	USA	Arnie Mausser
1	GK	USA	Bob Stetler
2	MF	ENG	Farrukh Quraishi
3	DF	SCO	Alex Pringle
4	DF	ENG	Tommy Smith (capt.)
5	DF	USA	Ringo Cantillo
6	DF	USA	Colin Fowles
7	FW	SCO	Stewart Scullion
8	MF	USA	Randy Garber
9	FW	BER	Clyde Best
10	FW	ENG	Rodney Marsh
11	FW	USA	Doug Wark
11	MF	USA	Dennis Wit
12	FW	RSA	Derek Smethurst
13	DF	ENG	Stewart Jump
14	FW	USA	Joey Fink
15	MF	ENG	Mark Lindsay
16	DF	USA	John Bluem
17	FW	USA	Eddie Austin
18	DF	HAI	Arsène Auguste
19	MF	ENG	Len Glover

=== Management and technical staff ===
- (United States) George W. Strawbridge, Jr., owner
- (United States) Beau Rodgers, general manager
- (Italy) Eddie Firmani, head coach
- (England) Ken Shields, trainer
- (Portugal) Francisco Marcos, public relations director
- (United States) Alfredo Beronda, equipment manager

=== Honors ===
Seven different Rowdies received nine individual honors following the 1976 NASL season.

- NASL North American Player of the Year: Arnie Mausser
- NASL Coach of the Year: Eddie Firmani
- NASL Leading goal scorer: Derek Smethurst (20 goals)
- NASL All-Star, First Team: Arnie Mausser
- NASL All-Star, First Team: Tommy Smith
- NASL All-Star, First Team: Rodney Marsh
- NASL All-Star, Second Team: Stewart Jump
- NASL All-Star, Second Team: Derek Smethurst
- NASL All-Star, Second Team: Stewart Scullion

== Competitions ==
=== Preseason friendlies ===
In January 1976 Tampa Bay made a four match tour of Haiti. The first was a, 1–1, draw on January 13 versus the Haitian National Team before a crowd of 21,000. Two days later another 21,000 witnessed the National Team defeat the Rowdies, 1–0. The third match of the tour was played on January 17, against the club side Racing CH with Tampa Bay dominating, 4–1, as 21,500 looked on. In the final Haitian game, the Rowdies edged Victory SC, 2–1, before 13,000 fans.

In early April Tampa Bay also played back-to-back friendlies with the San Antonio Thunder. The first was a 1–2 defeat, played at Sarasota High School which drew 2,845 fans. The following night as Tarpon Springs High School the teams played to a 0–0 draw before 2,500 onlookers. Tampa Bay finished the preseason with a record of 2–2–2.

==== Results ====
Date	Opponent	Venue	Result	Attendance	Scorers
January 13, 1976	Haiti National Team	Stade Sylvio Cator	1–1	21,000	Joe Fink
January 15, 1976	Haiti National Team	Stade Sylvio Cator	1–0	21,000	–
January 17, 1976	(Haiti) Racing CH	Stade Sylvio Cator	1–4	21,500	Joe Fink (2), Rodney Marsh, Doug Wark
January 19, 1976	(Haiti) Victory SC	Stade Sylvio Cator	1–2	13,000	Rodney Marsh, Derek Smethurst
April 9, 1976	(United States) San Antonio Thunder	Ihrig Field	1–2	2,845	Clyde Best
April 10, 1976	(United States) San Antonio Thunder	Tarpon Springs HS	0–0	2,500	–

=== North American Soccer League season ===
The Rowdies finished the regular season with 154 points, positioning them in 1st place in the Eastern Division of the Atlantic Conference, and first overall out of 20 NASL teams. After a solid 8–4 start to the season, Tampa Bay finished even stronger with a 10–2 record the rest of the way for a league-best record of 18–6. They earned two more victories than their nearest foe. They scored 58 goals, which was second in the league, while their 30 goals-against tied them with three other clubs as the fewest. As regular season champions, Tampa Bay also earned home field advantage throughout the playoffs. The club averaged 16,452 fans per game in the regular season, with three matches surpassing 15,000, one reaching 32,000, and still another topping 42,000.

==== Regular-season standings ====
W = Wins, L = Losses, GF = Goals For, GA = Goals Against, BP = Bonus Points, Pts= point system

6 points for a win, 1 point for a shootout win, 0 points for a loss, 1 point for each regulation goal scored up to three per game.

-League Premiers (most points). -Other playoff teams.

Eastern Division	W	L	GF	GA	BP	Pts	Home	Road
Tampa Bay Rowdies	18	6	58	30	46	154	12-0	6-6
New York Cosmos	16	8	65	34	52	148	9-3	7-5
Washington Diplomats	14	10	46	38	42	126	10-2	4-8
Philadelphia Atoms	8	16	32	49	32	80	6-6	2-10
Miami Toros	6	18	29	58	27	63	4-8	2-10

==== Regular season results ====
Date	Opponent	Venue	Result	Attendance	Scorers
April 24, 1976	Chicago Sting	H	2–1	32,611	Rodney Marsh, Derek Smethurst
April 30, 1976	Boston Minutemen	H	1–0	11,417	Joey Fink
May 2, 1976	Washington Diplomats	A	2–0	8,238	–
May 7, 1976	Chicago Sting	A	0–1	2,865	Derek Smethurst
May 14, 1976	Seattle Sounders	H	3–2	10,342	Rodney Marsh (2), Scullion
May 16, 1976	Toronto Metros-Croatia	A	2–0	3,890	–
May 19, 1976	Hartford Bicentennials	H	5–2	7,692	Derek Smethurst (3), Clyde Best, Rodnet Marsh
June 6, 1976	New York Cosmos	H	5–1	42,611	Derek Smethurst (3), Clyde Best, Stewart Scullion
June 8, 1976	Philadelphia Atoms	A	2–1	4,241	Stewart Scullion
June 12, 1976	San Antonio Thunder	H	0–0 (SO, 5–4)	11,158	–
June 18, 1976	San Diego Jaws	A	0–2	8,246	Mark Lindsay, Stewart Scullion
June 19, 1976	Los Angeles Aztecs	A	2–1 (OT)	9,354	Derek Smethurst
June 23, 1976	Rochester Lancers	H	2–0	7,276	Rodney Marsh (2)
July 2, 1976	Miami Toros	A	1–2	3,500 (est.)	Derek Smethurst (2)
July 10, 1976	Washington Diplomats	H	1–0	18,233	Stewart Scullion
July 14, 1976	New York Cosmos	A	5–4	27,892	Clyde Best (3), Derek Smethurst
July 17, 1976	Toronto Metros-Croatia	H	4–1	12,869	Mark Lindsay, Rodney Marsh, Derek Smethurst, own goal
July 21, 1976	Philadelphia Atoms	H	2–1 (OT)	10,262	Clyde Best, Derek Smethurst
July 24, 1976	Miami Toros	H	4–1	15,951	Stewart Scullion (3), Derek Smethurst
July 30, 1976	Hartford Bicentennials	A	0–7	3,800	Derek Smethurst (4), Clyde Best, Stewart Jump, Mark Lindsay
August 1, 1976	Boston Minutemen	A	2–4	981	Clyde Best (2), Rodney Marsh, Derek Smethurst
August 7, 1976	Minnesota Kicks	H	2–1	17,007	Stewart Scullion, Rodney Marsh
August 11, 1976	Rochester Lancers	A	2–1	6,797	Len Glover
August 14, 1976	Portland Timbers	A	2–3 (OT)	17,199	Stewart Scullion, Mark Lindsay, Derek Smethurst

=== NASL playoffs ===
Tampa Bay's two home playoff matches drew more than 36,000 and 28,000 respectively.

==== Playoff results ====
Date	Opponent	Venue	Result	Attendance	Scorers
August 20, 1976	New York Cosmos	H	3–1	36,863	Derek Smethurst, Stewart Scullion, Rodney Marsh
August 24, 1977	Toronto Metros-Croatia	H	0–2	28,046	–

==== Playoff bracket ====
First round
E2	New York Cosmos	2
E3	Washington Diplomats	0
N2	Toronto Metros-Croatia	2
N3	Rochester Lancers	1
S2	Dallas Tornado	2
S3	Los Angeles Aztecs	0
W2	Seattle Sounders	1
W3	Vancouver Whitecaps	0

Division Championships
E1	Tampa Bay Rowdies	3
E2	New York Cosmos	1
N1	Chicago Sting	2(1)
N2	Toronto Metros-Croatia	2(3)
S1	San Jose Earthquakes	2
S2	Dallas Tornado	0
W1	Minnesota Kicks	3
W2	Seattle Sounders	0

Conference Championships
E1	Tampa Bay Rowdies	0
N2	Toronto Metros-Croatia	2
S1	San Jose Earthquakes	1
W1	Minnesota Kicks	3

Soccer Bowl '76
N2	Toronto Metros-Croatia	3
W1	Minnesota Kicks	0

== Statistics ==
=== Season scoring ===
GP = Games Played, G = Goals (worth 2 points), A = Assists (worth 1 point), Pts = Points

Player	GP	G	A	Pts
Derek Smethurst	24	20	5	45
Rodney Marsh	21	11	9	31
Stewart Scullion	24	10	10	30
Clyde Best	19	9	6	24
Mark Lindsay	21	4	4	12
Len Glover	14	1	5	7
Joey Fink	9	1	1	3
Ringo Cantillo	21	0	3	3
Dennis Wit	7	0	3	3
Stewart Jump	17	1	0	2
Alex Pringle	22	0	1	1
Randy Garber	5	0	1	1
Arnie Mausser	24	0	0	0
Arsène Auguste	17	0	0	0
Tommy Smith	17	0	0	0
Farrukh Quraishi	15	0	0	0
John Bluem	13	0	0	0
Doug Wark	4	0	0	0
Eddie Austin	4	0	0	0
Bob Stetler	4	0	0	0
Colin Fowles	0	0	0	0

=== Season goalkeeping ===
Note: GP = Games played; Min = Minutes played; Svs = Saves; GA = Goals against; GAA = Goals against average; W = Wins; L = Losses

Player	GP	Min	Svs	GA	GAA	W	L
Arnie Mausser	24	2011	201	28	1.17	18	6
Bob Stetler	4	43	3	2	4.19	0	0

=== Playoff scoring ===
GP = Games Played, G = Goals (worth 2 points), A = Assists (worth 1 point), Pts = Points

Player	GP	G	A	Pts
Rodney Marsh	2	1	1	3
Derek Smethurst	2	1	0	2
Stewart Scullion	2	1	0	2
Alex Pringle	2	0	1	1
Clyde Best	2	0	0	0
Mark Lindsay	2	0	0	0
Len Glover	2	0	0	0
Joey Fink	2	0	0	0
Ringo Cantillo	2	0	0	0
Stewart Jump	2	0	0	0
Arnie Mausser	2	0	0	0
Tommy Smith	2	0	0	0
Eddie Austin	1	0	0	0
Dennis Wit	1	0	0	0

=== Playoff goalkeeping ===
Note: GP = Games played; Min = Minutes played; Svs = Saves; GA = Goals against; GAA = Goals against average; W = Wins; L = Losses

Player	GP	Min	Svs	GA	GAA	W	L
Arnie Mausser	2	180	17	3	1.50	1	1

== Player movement ==
=== In ===
No.	Pos.	Player	Transferred from	Fee/notes	Date	Source
14	FW	(United States) Joey Fink	(United States) New York Cosmos	purchased	November 18, 1975	
1	GK	(United States) Arnie Mausser	(United States) Hartford Bicentennials	purchased	November 25, 1975	
10	FW	(England) Rodney Marsh	(England) Manchester City	$100,000 transfer fee	January 11, 1976	
6	DF	(United States) Colin Fowles	(United States) LIU Brooklyn Blackbirds	amateur draft	January 14, 1976	
4	DF	(England) Tommy Smith	(England) Liverpool	on loan	February 24, 1976	
5	DF	(United States) Ringo Cantillo	(United States) New York Inter-Giuliana SC	on loan	April 20, 1976	
19	MF	(England) Len Glover	(England) Leicester City	on loan	April 22, 1976	
11	MF	(United States) Dennis Wit	(United States) San Diego Jaws	player trade	July 12, 1976	

=== Out ===
No.	Pos.	Player	Transferred to	Fee/notes	Date	Source
1	GK	(England) Paul Hammond	(England) Crystal Palace	returned from loan	August 28, 1975	
14	FW	(England) John Sissons	(England) Chelsea	returned from loan	August 28, 1975	
4	MF	(Scotland) John Boyle	none	released	September 13, 1975	
6	DF	(South Africa) Mike Connell	none	compulsory military service	December 17, 1975	
1	GK	(Scotland) Mike Hewitt	(United States) San Jose Earthquakes	sold contract	February 20, 1976	
7	MF	(South Africa) Bernard Hartze	(United States) Tacoma Tides	on loan	April 7, 1976	
5	DF	(England) Malcolm Linton	(United States) Los Angeles Aztecs	sold contract	April 14, 1976	
8	MF	(United States) Randy Garber	(United States) Los Angeles Aztecs	traded for draft pick	May 17, 1976	
10	FW	(United States) Eddie Engerth	(United States) Philadelphia Atoms	traded for draft pick	June 10, 1976	
11	FW	(United States) Doug Wark	(United States) San Diego Jaws	player trade	July 12, 1976	

== See also ==
- 1976 North American Soccer League season
- 1976 in American soccer
- Tampa Bay Rowdies (1975–1993)
