= 1975 Tampa Bay Rowdies season =

Tampa Bay Rowdies
1975 season
- President: (United States) George W. Strawbridge, Jr.
- Head coach: (Italy) Eddie Firmani
- Stadium: Tampa Stadium
- NASL: Division: 1st Playoffs: Champions
- U.S. Open Cup: Did not enter
- Top goalscorer: League: (South Africa) Derek Smethurst (18 goals); All: (South Africa) Derek Smethurst (21 goals)
- Highest home attendance: 22,710 (Aug. 16 vs. Miami)
- Lowest home attendance: 5,281 (May 28 vs. Denver)
- Average home league attendance: 12,064
Home colors	Away colors	Third colors

The 1975 Tampa Bay Rowdies season was the first season of the club's existence.

== Kit ==
During the outdoor campaign occasionally a random Rowdies player could be seen wearing the collarless jersey used by all players during the 1975 indoor season earlier in the year, but by season's end the full-collar style that would become so familiar in all of Tampa Bay's later NASL campaigns eventually took over. The striping sequence on the sleeves was also different. Tampa Bay would not wear a cuff-style collar again until the 1986–87 American Indoor Soccer Association season.

== Club ==
=== Roster ===
No.	Position	Nation	Player
1	GK	ENG	Paul Hammond
1	GK	SCO	Mike Hewitt
1	GK	USA	Bob Stetler
2	DF	ENG	Farrukh Quraishi
3	DF	SCO	Alex Pringle
4	MF	SCO	John Boyle (capt.)
5	DF	ENG	Malcolm Linton
6	DF	RSA	Mike Connell
7	MF	RSA	Bernard Hartze
8	MF	USA	Randy Garber
9	FW	BER	Clyde Best
10	FW	SCO	Stewart Scullion
11	FW	SCO	Doug Wark
12	FW	RSA	Derek Smethurst
13	DF	ENG	Stewart Jump
14	FW	ENG	John Sissons
15	MF	ENG	Mark Lindsay
16	DF	USA	John Bluem
17	FW	USA	Eddie Austin
18	DF	HAI	Arsène Auguste
18	MF	ITA	Eddie Firmani

=== Management and technical staff ===
- (United States) George Strawbridge, Jr., owner
- (United States) Beau Rogers, general manager
- (Italy) Eddie Firmani, head coach
- (United States) Chas Serednesky, business manager
- (Portugal) Francisco Marcos, director of public relations
- (United States) Alfredo Beronda, equipment manager

=== Honors ===
The Rowdies received eight individual honors following the 1975 NASL season.

- Soccer Bowl Man of the Match: Stewart Jump
- NASL All-Star, First Team: Farrukh Quraishi
- NASL All-Star, Second Team: Stewart Jump, John Boyle, Stewart Scullion
- NASL All-Star, Honorable Mention: John Sissons, Clyde Best, Derek Smethurst

== Review ==
The 1975 North American Soccer League season was the Tampa Bay Rowdies first outdoors. The expansion Rowdies had only recently completed a successful debut in the 1975 indoor tournament, by finishing as runners-up. With Eddie Firmani as coach and John Boyle as team captain, they opened outdoor play by splitting a pair of preseason friendlies versus the San Antonio Thunder.

Tampa Bay's first regular season match was played at Tampa Stadium against the Rochester Lancers before 12,133 paying customers (and another 3,000-plus, who were there for free). Their first ever goal was scored by Derek Smethurst in the opening half. The first goal conceded by the Rowdies occurred at the 27:59 mark when Tommy Ord put one past Tampa Bay goalie Mike Hewitt. The game remained tied 1–1 at the end of 90 minutes. At 3:45 of golden goal overtime, second-half substitute, Alex Pringle, recorded the teams' first ever game-winning goal. The game also saw Firmani (age 41) insert himself into the lineup with about one minute remaining in regulation. This was because several players had been delayed in Europe, causing the Tampa Bay roster to be a bit thin for the match.

The Rowdies success carried on as they went on to record winning streaks of six and seven games during the regular season. Tampa Bay finished the year tied with the Portland Timbers for the best record in the league with a mark of 16–6. The winning ways continued into the playoffs as they did not concede a single goal in any round. They defeated Toronto Metros-Croatia, 1–0, in the quarterfinals. That was followed by a 3–0 dismantling of 1974 league runners-up, and Florida Derby rival, Miami Toros in the semifinal, which sent them into the Soccer Bowl.

The Soccer Bowl '75 championship match featured the two teams with the best records in the NASL, the Rowdies and Portland. Coincidentally both squads were also expansion teams. Behind a stingy defense and a pair of second half goals by Arsène Auguste and Clyde Best, Tampa Bay came away the victors, 2–0. Defender Stewart Jump was named man of the match. This would be the Rowdies only outdoor NASL championship.

== Competitions ==
=== Friendlies ===
February 8, 1975 1	South Florida Bulls	1–3	Tampa Bay Rowdies	Tampa, Florida
12:00 P.M.		Report	Hartze,	Stadium: USF Soccer Stadium

April 11, 1975 2	Tampa Bay Rowdies	2–1	San Antonio Thunder	Tarpon Springs, Florida
7:30 P.M.	Boyle 65'; Smethurst 75'	Report p. 3-C	Marotte (89:30)	Stadium: Tarpon Springs High School

April 13, 1975 3	Tampa Bay Rowdies	1–3	San Antonio Thunder	Winter Park, Florida
1:30 P.M.	Forteis (40:32)	Report p. 3-C	Wolf (9:16); Hylkema (16:35); Didi (76:10)	Stadium: Sandspur Field; Attendance: 2,000

May 19, 1975 4	Hartwick/Oneonta All-Stars	1–2	Tampa Bay Rowdies	Oneonta, New York
	Napolitano	Report	Wark (Lindsay); Smethurst (Lindsay)	Stadium: Oneonta State Field; Attendance: 1,000 (est)

December 21, 1975 5	USSF All-Stars' Coaches	0–1	Tampa Bay Rowdies	Orlando, Florida
		Report	Garber (Mausser)	Stadium: Tangerine Bowl; Attendance: 250 (est)

=== NASL regular season ===
==== Division standings ====
Pos	Eastern Division	GP	W	L	GF	GA	GD	Pts	Qualification
1	Tampa Bay Rowdies	22	16	6	46	27	+19	135	NASL Playoffs
2	Miami Toros	22	14	8	47	30	+17	123	NASL Playoffs
3	Washington Diplomats	22	12	10	42	47	−5	112
4	Philadelphia Atoms	22	10	12	33	42	−9	90
5	Baltimore Comets	22	9	13	34	52	−18	87

==== Overall League Placing ====
Pos	Club	Pld	W	L	GF	GA	GD	Pts
1	Portland Timbers	22	16	6	43	27	+16	138
2	Tampa Bay Rowdies	22	16	6	46	27	+19	135
3	Seattle Sounders	22	15	7	42	28	+14	129
4	Miami Toros	22	14	8	47	30	+17	123
5	Boston Minutemen	22	13	9	41	29	+12	116

==== Match reports ====
April 26, 1975 1	Tampa Bay Rowdies	2–1(OT)	Rochester Lancers	Tampa, Florida
	Smethurst (13:51); Pringle 93:45' (Boyle)	Report	Ord (27:59)	Stadium: Tampa Stadium; Attendance: 12,133

May 3, 1975 2	Tampa Bay Rowdies	1–0	New York Cosmos	Tampa, Florida
	Scullion (7:46)	Report		Stadium: Tampa Stadium; Attendance: 8,378

May 9, 1975 3	Washington Diplomats	3–0	Tampa Bay Rowdies	Washington, D.C.
	Ingram (6:17); Horton (16:17); Horton (18:52)	Report		Stadium: Robert F. Kennedy Stadium; Attendance: 10,340

May 14, 1975 4	Tampa Bay Rowdies	3–1	Boston Minutemen	Tampa, Florida
	Smethurst (28:55); Best (71:49); Best (74:44)	Report	Wooler (81:28)	Stadium: Tampa Stadium; Attendance: 6,117; Referee: Don DeSalvador

May 17, 1975 5	Connecticut Bicentennials	1–3	Tampa Bay Rowdies	New Haven, Connecticut
	Travljanin 78' (H. McCully)	Report	Smethurst 30'; Boyle 53' (Smethurst); Best 82' (Quraishi)	Stadium: Yale Bowl; Attendance: 3,410

May 21, 1975 6	Baltimore Comets	1–2	Tampa Bay Rowdies	Baltimore, Maryland
	Henderson (5:36)	Report	Boyle (53:56); Smethurst (81:15)	Stadium: Memorial Stadium; Attendance: 3,648

May 28, 1975 7	Tampa Bay Rowdies	3–2	Denver Dynamos	Tampa, Florida
	Scullion (3:35); Ntsoelengoe (42:32); Scullion (60:21)	Report	Dawes (17:31); Flater (22:28)	Stadium: Tampa Stadium; Attendance: 5,281; Referee: Larry King

May 31, 1975 8	San Antonio Thunder	0–4	Tampa Bay Rowdies	San Antonio, Texas
		Report	Smethurst (20:22); Best (65:55); Garber (70:34); Hartze (74:58)	Stadium: Alamo Stadium; Attendance: 4,619; Referee: Robert Evans

June 6, 1975 9	Miami Toros	0–1	Tampa Bay Rowdies	Miami, Florida
		Report	Smethurst (56:14)	Stadium: Miami Orange Bowl; Attendance: 14,259

June 11, 1975 10	Tampa Bay Rowdies	0–2	Miami Toros	Tampa, Florida
		Report	David (49:11); Jordan (79:36)	Stadium: Tampa Stadium; Attendance: 18,654; Referee: Gino D'Ippolito

June 13, 1975 11	Philadelphia Atoms	1–2	Tampa Bay Rowdies	Philadelphia, Pennsylvania
	McLaughlin (74:45)	Report on p. 1-C	Best (45:55); Scullion (84:41)	Stadium: Veterans Stadium; Attendance: 5,819

June 20, 1975 12	Dallas Tornado	0–0 (4–2 p)	Tampa Bay Rowdies	Irving, Texas
		Report		Stadium: Texas Stadium; Attendance: 4,179
	Penalties
	Ley (penalty scored); Gore (penalty scored); Moore (penalty scored); Chadwick (penalty scored)		(penalty scored) Smethurst; (penalty missed) Garber; (penalty scored) Connell; (penalty missed) Boyle

June 21, 1975 13	St. Louis Stars	1–1 (3–5 p)	Tampa Bay Rowdies	St. Louis, Missouri
	Geimer (11:41)	Report	Smethurst (41:33)	Stadium: Francis Field; Attendance: 7,731
	Penalties
	Burnett (penalty missed); Hawley (penalty scored); Matteson (penalty scored); Trost (penalty scored)		(penalty scored) Smethurst; (penalty scored) Pringle; (penalty scored) Jump; (penalty scored) Connell; (penalty scored) Scullion

June 28, 1975 14	Tampa Bay Rowdies	6–1	Baltimore Comets	Tampa, Florida
	Sissons (8:45); Scullion (13:25); Sissons (34:40); Smethurst (71:50); Sissons (78:53); Scullion (79:20)	Report	Henderson (26:59)	Stadium: Tampa Stadium; Attendance: 8,610

July 12, 1975 15	Tampa Bay Rowdies	4–0	Baltimore Comets	Tampa, Florida
	Sissons (Scullion); Smethurst (Boyle); Smethurst (84:38); Lindsay (89:20)	Report		Stadium: Tampa Stadium; Attendance: 13,400

July 19, 1975 16	Tampa Bay Rowdies	2–1	Philadelphia Atoms	Tampa, Florida
	Smethurst (3:33); Smethurst (17:26)	Report	Bahr (16:32)	Stadium: Tampa Stadium; Attendance: 10,103

July 23, 1975 17	Tampa Bay Rowdies	5–1	Miami Toros	Tampa, Florida
	Best (19:12); Sissons (57:40); Connell (66:50); Smethurst (72:57); Smethurst (87:35)	Report	David (89:57)	Stadium: Tampa Stadium; Attendance: 11,415

July 26, 1975 18	Tampa Bay Rowdies	3–1	Washington Diplomats	Tampa, Florida
	Scullion (36:25); Smethurst (72:51); Boyle (85:45)	Report	Barry (56:36)	Stadium: Tampa Stadium; Attendance: 11,153

July 29, 1975 19	Philadelphia Atoms	0–1(OT)	Tampa Bay Rowdies	Philadelphia, Pennsylvania
		Report	Smethurst 90:56'	Stadium: Veterans Stadium; Attendance: 4,517

August 2, 1975 20	Washington Diplomats	3–1	Tampa Bay Rowdies	Washington, D.C.
	Horton (21:23); Ingram (27:58); Horton (40:13)	Report	Smethurst (5:35)	Stadium: RFK Stadium; Attendance: 2,415

August 6, 1975 21	Tampa Bay Rowdies	0–3	Chicago Sting	Tampa, Florida
		Report	Hill (11:54); Hill (37:59); Allen (88:00)	Stadium: Tampa Stadium; Attendance: 12,761

August 9, 1975 22	Toronto Metros-Croatia	3–1	Tampa Bay Rowdies	Toronto, Ontario
	Vieri (10:30); Ferreira (69:30); Polak (77:15)	Report	Smethurst (11:30)	Stadium: Varsity Stadium; Attendance: 8,248

=== NASL Playoffs ===
==== Bracket ====
Quarter-finals
W1	Portland Timbers	2
W2	Seattle Sounders	1
C1	St. Louis Stars	1(5)
W3	Los Angeles Aztecs	1(4)
E2	Miami Toros	2
N1	Boston Minutemen	1
N2	Toronto Metros-Croatia	0
E1	Tampa Bay Rowdies	1

Semi-finals
W1	Portland Timbers	1
C1	St. Louis Stars	0
E2	Miami Toros	0
E1	Tampa Bay Rowdies	3

Soccer Bowl '75
W1	Portland Timbers	0
E1	Tampa Bay Rowdies	2

==== Match reports ====
August 13, 1975 Quarterfinals	Tampa Bay Rowdies	1–0	Toronto Metros-Croatia	Tampa, Florida
	Best (49:42)	Report		Stadium: Tampa Stadium; Attendance: 16,111

August 16, 1975 Semifinals	Tampa Bay Rowdies	3–0	Miami Toros	Tampa, Florida
	Scullion (54:33); Smethurst (66:58); Boyle (88:40)	Report		Stadium: Tampa Stadium; Attendance: 22,710

August 24, 1975 Soccer Bowl '75	Tampa Bay Rowdies	2–0	Portland Timbers	San Jose, California
	Auguste (66:00); Best (87:40)	Report		Stadium: Spartan Stadium; Attendance: 17,009
