= 1975 Tampa Bay Rowdies indoor season =

Tampa Bay Rowdies
1975 indoor season
- Owner: (United States) George W. Strawbridge, Jr.
- General manager: (United States) Beau Rodgers
- Manager: (Italy) Eddie Firmani
- Stadium: Bayfront Center
- NASL: Regional: Champion; League: Runners-up
- Top goalscorer: (United States) Doug Wark (10 goals)
- Highest home attendance: 4,437 (Feb. 14 vs. Diplomats)
- Lowest home attendance: 4,032 (Feb. 16 vs. Comets)
- Average home league attendance: 4,235
| Home colors | Away colors |

The 1975 Tampa Bay Rowdies indoor season was the first indoor season of the club's existence. It also marked the first time the expansion Rowdies participated in any North American Soccer League sanctioned competition.

== Original kit ==
The Rowdies' jersey used during the 1975 indoor season was different than later indoor and outdoor years in that the neckline was merely a cuff rather than the full collar style that became so familiar in all of Tampa Bay's later NASL campaigns. Photographic evidence also indicates that the cuff-style jersey saw limited use during the 1975 outdoor season, but by season's end it disappeared altogether.

== Club ==
=== Roster ===
| No. | Position | Nation | Player |
|---|---|---|---|
| 1 | GK | SCO | Mike Hewitt |
| 1 | GK | USA | Bob Stetler* |
| 2 | DF | ENG | Farrukh Quraishi |
| 3 | DF | SCO | Alex Pringle |
| 4 | MF | SCO | John Boyle (capt.) |
| 5 | MF | CRC | Ringo Cantillo |
| 6 | DF | RSA | Mike Connell |
| 7 | MF | RSA | Bernard Hartze |
| 8 | MF | USA | Randy Garber |
| 9 | DF | BRA | Lima |
| 9 | MF | CAN | Nick Papadakis |
| 10 | FW | USA | Eddie Engerth |
| 11 | FW | USA | Doug Wark |
| 12 | FW | USA | Bob Isaacson |
| 12 | FW | MEX | Javier Alvarez |
| 13 | MF | POL | Zygmunt Lezak |
| 13 | DF | USA | John Bluem |
| 15 | FW | ITA | Eddie Firmani |

*amateur player

=== Management and technical staff ===
- (United States) George Strawbridge, Jr., owner
- (United States) Beau Rogers, general manager
- (Italy) Eddie Firmani, head coach
- (United States) Chas Serednesky, business manager
- (Portugal) Francisco Marcos, director of public relations
- (United States) Alfredo Beronda, equipment manager

=== Honors ===
- NASL Indoor Tournament: Runners up
- NASL Indoor, Region 3: Regional champions

==== Individual honors ====
- All-Tournament Team: Doug Wark
- Regional MVP: Ringo Cantillo (Regional totals: 2 games, 4 goals)

== Review ==
In part because of the success of the spring 1974 indoor tour by the Red Army team the NASL decided to hold an indoor tournament of its own. Of the 20 franchises in the league, sixteen participated. Teams were separated into four regional groups of four. The Bayfront Center in St. Petersburg, Florida, was chosen as one of the Regional venues, with the Rowdies as hosts for Region 3. The San Jose Earthquakes were given the honor of hosting the championship semifinals and finals at the Cow Palace.

=== Region 3 tournament ===
The winner of the Region 3 would gain an automatic place in the Championship tournament four weeks later in California. In their first tournament game the Rowdies had no trouble with the Washington Diplomats, winning by a score of 7–2. Two nights later Tampa Bay had a tougher task in coming from behind to defeat the Baltimore Comets, 8–6. Those two victories left the Rowdies tied with the Miami Toros in the standings, however the tie-breaker was goal differential. Tampa Bay's plus-7 goal margin narrowly edged out the Toros’ plus-6, and the Rowdies advanced. Ringo Cantillo was named MVP of the Region, edging out Miami's Nico Bodonczy by one vote.

==== Regional standings ====
| Pos | Team | G | W | L | GF | GA | GD | PTS |
|---|---|---|---|---|---|---|---|---|
| 1 | Tampa Bay Rowdies | 2 | 2 | 0 | 15 | 8 | +7 | 4 |
| 2 | Miami Toros | 2 | 2 | 0 | 18 | 12 | +6 | 4 |
| 3 | Baltimore Comets | 2 | 0 | 2 | 14 | 19 | -5 | 0 |
| 4 | Washington Diplomats | 2 | 0 | 2 | 6 | 14 | -8 | 0 |

=== Championship tournament ===
Tampa Bay was paired up with the New York Cosmos in the semifinals, while the other semifinal had San Jose clashing with the Dallas Tornado. Led by Doug Wark’s record six-goal performance, the Rowdies jumped out to an early 3–0 lead, and never looked back, as they dispatched the Cosmos, 13–5, to advance to the final on Sunday.

On March 16, 1975, the Tampa Bay faced a heavily favored San Jose Earthquakes team in the Rowdies first of what would be many championship finals, against. With the score 6–1 at the end of the first period, and 8,618 fans behind them, San Jose showed exactly why they were tabbed to win the tournament. From there the home team cruised to an 8–5 victory. In addition to the Rowdies’ runner-up performance, Doug Wark was named to the All-Tournament squad and was the second leading scorer in the tournament.

==== Bracket ====
Semifinals
R4 | San Jose Earthquakes | 8
R1 | Dallas Tornado | 5
R3 | Tampa Bay Rowdies | 13
R2 | New York Cosmos | 5

Championship Final
R4 | San Jose Earthquakes | 8
R3 | Tampa Bay Rowdies | 5

==== Championship standings ====
| Pos | Team | G | W | L | GF | GA | GD |
|---|---|---|---|---|---|---|---|
| 1 | San Jose Earthquakes | 4 | 4 | 0 | 37 | 17 | +20 |
| 2 | Tampa Bay Rowdies | 4 | 3 | 1 | 33 | 21 | +11 |
| 3 | Dallas Tornado | 4 | 2 | 2 | 14 | 12 | +2 |
| 4 | New York Cosmos | 4 | 1 | 3 | 18 | 27 | -9 |
| 5 | Miami Toros | 2 | 2 | 0 | 18 | 12 | +6 |

=== Match reports ===
| February 14, 1975 Regional #1 | Tampa Bay Rowdies | 7–2 | Washington Diplomats | St. Petersburg, Florida |
| 8:30 PM EST | Engerth 10:38'; Engerth 14:55'; Wark 23:30'; Wark 29:33'; Cantillo 36:17'; Cantillo 39:15'; Connell 43:15' (Garber) | Report on p. 5-C | DeLeon 23:45'; Diane 35:25' | Stadium: Bayfront Center; Attendance: 4,437 |

| February 16, 1975 Regional #2 | Tampa Bay Rowdies | 8–6 | Baltimore Comets | St. Petersburg, Florida |
| 8:30 PM EST | Quraishi 12:17', 26:38', 39:12'; Papadakis 14:51', 24:49'; Cantillo 40:43', 40:46'; Wark 41:59' | Report | Scurti 1:24'; Kazmierski 6:12', 31:29'; Wit 12:54', 14:28', 25:28' | Stadium: Bayfront Center; Attendance: 4,032 |

| March 14, 1975 Semifinal | Tampa Bay Rowdies | 13–5 | New York Cosmos | Daly City, California |
| 7:00 PM PDT | Cantillo 2:31' (Boyle); Wark 4:13' (Pringle); Wark 6:34' (Quraishi); Wark 13:50'; Wark 14:34' (Hartze); Lezak 17:22'; Hartze 22:03'; Hartze 22:42' (Cantillo); Wark 33:03' (Lima); Hartze 35:34'; Lezak 35:55' (Cantillo); Lezak 39:35' (Hartze); Wark 59:35' (Connell) | Report A Report B | Lamas 10:46' (Mărdărescu); Mărdărescu 12:07'; Lamas 27:08' (Parades); Lamas 44:06' (Roth); Correa 49:36' | Stadium: Cow Palace; Attendance: 9,113; Referee: John Davies |

| March 16, 1975 Final | San Jose Earthquakes | 8–5 | Tampa Bay Rowdies | Daly City, California |
| 9:00 PM PDT | Roboostoff 7:10'; Child 9:25' (Gavric); Roboostoff 14:36' (Child); Child 16:22' (Welch); Roboostoff 18:38' (Moore); Welch 19:38' (Child); Zaczynski 50:50' (Child); Child 52:56' | Report A (p. 2C); Report B | Engerth 9:36' (Lima); Hartze 25:14' (Quraishi); Lezak 33:35'; Wark 50:55' (Hartze); Quraishi 54:56' (Boyle) | Stadium: Cow Palace; Attendance: 8,618; Referee: Henry Landuer |

== Statistics ==
=== Scoring ===
GP = Games Played, G = Goals (worth 2 points), A = Assists (worth 1 point), Pts = Points

| Player | GP | G | A | Pts |
|---|---|---|---|---|
| Doug Wark | 4 | 10 | 0 | 20 |
| Ringo Cantillo | 4 | 5 | 2 | 12 |
| Bernard Hartze | 3 | 4 | 3 | 11 |
| Farrukh Quraishi | 4 | 4 | 2 | 10 |
| Zygmunt Lezak | 2 | 4 | 0 | 8 |
| Eddie Engerth | 3 | 3 | 0 | 6 |
| Nick Papadakis | 3 | 2 | 0 | 4 |
| Mike Connell | 3 | 1 | 1 | 3 |
| John Boyle | 4 | 0 | 2 | 2 |
| Lima | 2 | 0 | 2 | 2 |
| Alex Pringle | 4 | 0 | 1 | 1 |
| Randy Garber | 1 | 0 | 1 | 1 |
| Javier Alvarez | - | 0 | 0 | 0 |
| Bob Isaacson | - | 0 | 0 | 0 |

=== Goalkeeping ===
Note: GP = Games played; Min = Minutes played; GA = Goals against; GAA = Goals against average; W = Wins; L = Losses

| Player | GP | Min | GA | GAA | W | L |
|---|---|---|---|---|---|---|
| Mike Hewitt | 4 | 210 | 21 | 5.25 | 3 | 1 |
| Bob Stetler | 0 | 0 | 0 | 0 | 0 | 0 |

== Player movement ==
Since Tampa Bay was a newly formed club, the entire roster was new.

=== In ===
| No. | Pos. | Player | Transferred from | Fee/notes | Date | Source |
|---|---|---|---|---|---|---|
| 3 | DF | (Scotland) Alex Pringle | (Scotland) Clyde F.C. | No details available | December 1974 | |
| 1 | GK | (Scotland) Mike Hewitt | (Scotland) Dundee F.C. | Contract purchased from Dundee | December 1974 | |
| 7 | MF | (South Africa) Bernard Hartze | (South Africa) Cape Town Spurs | No details available | December 17, 1974 | |
| 2 | DF | (England) Farrukh Quraishi | (United States) Oneonta State | 1st overall pick of NASL college draft | January 18, 1975 | |
| 10 | FW | (United States) Eddie Engerth | (United States) Philadelphia amateur team | Former Hartwick College player | January 20, 1975 | |
| 6 | DF | (South Africa) Mike Connell | (South Africa) Rangers Johannesburg | No details available | January 20, 1975 | |
| 11 | DF | (United States) Doug Wark | (United States) Rochester Lancers | Purchased from Rochester | January 27, 1975 | |
| 4 | DF | (Scotland) John Boyle | (England) Orient | Obtained release after 5-month pursuit | February 6, 1975 | |
| 9 | MF | (Canada) Nick Papadakis | none | Free agent | February 9, 1975 | |
| 8 | MF | (United States) Randy Garber | (United States) Penn State | 2nd round of college draft | February 9, 1975 | |
| 12 | FW | (United States) Bob Isaacson | (United States) Hartwick College | 3rd round of college draft | February 9, 1975 | |
| 13 | DF | (United States) John Bluem | (United States) Hartwick College | 4th round of college draft | February 9, 1975 | |
| 12 | FW | (Mexico) Javier Alvarez | (United States) St. Petersburg Kickers | Free transfer | March 11, 1975 | |
| 15 | FW | (Italy) Eddie Firmani | none | Added as an emergency player | March 11, 1975 | |
| 1 | GK | (United States) Bob Stetler | (United States) East Stroudsburg State | No contract, to keep amateur status | January 1975 | |

=== Out ===
none

=== Loan in ===
| No. | Pos. | Player | Loaned from | Details | Start | Source |
|---|---|---|---|---|---|---|
| 5 | MF | (Costa Rica) Ringo Cantillo | (United States) Cincinnati Comets | Indoor season loan | February 9, 1975 | |
| 9 | MF | (Brazil) Lima | (Mexico) Club Deportivo Oro | Indoor loan with option for transfer | March 11, 1975 | |
| 13 | MF | (Poland) Zygmunt Lezak | (United States) Polonia NY | Indoor loan with option for transfer | March 11, 1975 | |

== See also ==
- 1975 team indoor stats
