= 1976 Tampa Bay Rowdies indoor season =

Tampa Bay Rowdies
1976 indoor season
- Owner: (United States) George W. Strawbridge, Jr.
- General manager: (United States) Beau Rodgers
- Manager: (Italy) Eddie Firmani
- Stadium: Bayfront Center
- NASL: Regional: Champion; League: Champion
- Top goalscorer: League: (Bermuda) Clyde Best (7 goals); All: (Bermuda) Clyde Best (11 goals)
- Highest home attendance: 5,787 (March 27 vs. Lancers)
- Lowest home attendance: 4,762 (March 12 vs. Diplomats)
- Average home league attendance: 5,464
Home colors	Away colors

The 1976 Tampa Bay Rowdies indoor season was the second indoor season of the club's existence. The Rowdies were able to replicate their 1975 outdoor success by winning the North American Soccer League's 1976 indoor championship.

== Club ==
=== Roster ===
No.	Position	Nation	Player
1	GK	USA	Arnie Mausser
1	GK	USA	Bob Stetler
2	DF	ENG	Farrukh Quraishi
3	DF	SCO	Alex Pringle
5	DF	ENG	Malcolm Linton
7	FW	RSA	Stewart Scullion
8	MF	CAN	Randy Garber
9	FW	BER	Clyde Best
10	FW	ENG	Rodney Marsh
11	FW	SCO	Doug Wark
12	FW	RSA	Derek Smethurst (capt.)
14	FW	USA	Joey Fink
15	MF	ENG	Mark Lindsay
16	DF	USA	John Bluem
17	MF	USA	Eddie Austin
18	DF	HAI	Arsène Auguste

=== Management and technical staff ===
- (United States) George Strawbridge, Jr., owner
- (United States) Beau Rogers, general manager
- (Italy) Eddie Firmani, head coach
- (United States) Chas Serednesky, business manager
- (Portugal) Francisco Marcos, director of public relations
- (United States) Mike Dolan and Stan Taylor, trainers
- (United States) John Kauzlarich, team physician
- (United States) Alfredo Beronda, equipment manager

=== Honors ===
- NASL Indoor Tournament: Champions
- NASL Indoor, Eastern Regional: Regional champions
- International Cup: Champions (friendly)

==== Individual honors ====
- Tournament MVP: Clyde Best (Tournament totals: 4 games, 7 goals, 4 assists)
- All-Tournament Team: Clyde Best, Stewart Scullion, Derek Smethurst
- Regional MVP: Stewart Scullion (Regional totals: 2 games, 3 goals, 1 assist)
- All-Regional Team: Stewart Scullion, Rodney Marsh, Arsene Auguste

== Review ==
The Tampa Bay Rowdies were the runners-up of the 1975 NASL Indoor tournament in March, and the winners of Soccer Bowl '75 in August, both held California at the home venues of the San Jose Earthquakes. In October 1975 the NASL announced that the Bayfront Center would host both the 1976 Indoor Eastern Regionals and Final Four. It was later announced that Tampa Bay would also play a pre-tournament international friendly at the Bayfront Center. This meant that all of the Rowdies indoor matches for 1976 would be played at home.

=== Friendlies ===
Billed in media reports as an International Challenge Cup Match, Tampa Bay’s first game was a pre-tournament international friendly versus Santos F.C. of Jamaica, and played on March 6 at the Bayfront Center. The Rowdies easily defeated their guests, who were playing indoor soccer for the very first time, by the score of 11–4.

=== Eastern Regionals ===
The winner of the Eastern Regional would gain an automatic place in the Final Four. In their first tournament game the Rowdies battled back from a 4–1 deficit midway through the second period, to score eight straight goals and defeat Washington, 9–5. The following evening Tampa Bay had a much easier time in defeating the Boston Minutemen, 5–3, as they dictated play until the final minutes, when Boston scored two meaningless late goals. Those two victories left the Rowdies as the only undefeated team in the group, and therefore champions of their region for the second straight year. Stewart Scullion was named Regional MVP, with Rodney Marsh and Arsene Auguste joining him on the All-Regional squad.

==== Regional standings ====
Pos	Team	G	W	L	GF	GA	GD	PTS
1	Tampa Bay Rowdies	2	2	0	14	8	+6	4
2	Washington Diplomats	2	1	1	14	12	+2	2
3	Miami Toros	2	1	1	9	15	-6	2
4	Boston Minutemen	2	0	2	9	11	-2	0

=== Final Four ===
In the semifinal Tampa Bay held a slim, one-goal lead in the third period over the Dallas Tornado. With less than three minutes remaining the Rowdies broke open the match the by scoring three straight goals in a span of 81 seconds to defeated Dallas, 6–2, and earn their second straight trip to the indoor finals.

On March 27, 1976, the Tampa Bay Rowdies played in their third championship final out of three total competitions in their brief history. This time they would face surprise finalists Rochester Lancers. Unfortunately for Rochester, goalkeeper Jim May was severely injured late in their semi-final upset win over San Jose, and could not play in the final. The Rowdies were without Rodney Marsh for the contest, as he suffered a head injury in the semi-final. In a closely fought match Tampa Bay prevailed, 6–4, on three goals by Derek Smethurst, two by Clyde Best, and one by Mark Lindsay. Smethurst’s game winning, third goal came with 3:18 left in the match. Best was named tournament MVP, with Smethurst and Stewart Scullion joining him on the All-Tournament squad.

==== Bracket ====
Semifinals
M1	Rochester Lancers	6
W1	San Jose Earthquakes	4
E1	Tampa Bay Rowdies	6
W2	Dallas Tornado	2

Championship Final
M1	Rochester Lancers	4
E1	Tampa Bay Rowdies	6

==== Championship standings ====
Pos	Team	G	W	L	GF	GA	GD
1	Tampa Bay Rowdies	4	4	0	26	14	+12
2	Rochester Lancers	4	3	1	20	16	+4
3	San Jose Earthquakes	4	3	1	35	18	+17
4	Dallas Tornado	4	2	2	20	15	+5

=== Match reports ===
March 6, 1976 1. Int’l friendly	Tampa Bay Rowdies	11–4	Santos F.C. (Jamaica)	St. Petersburg, Florida
7:30 PM (EST)	Wark 8:08' (Garber); Austin 14:11' (Marsh); Lindsay 17:19' (Marsh); Best 24:13' (Garber); Marsh 25:54' (Auguste); Marsh 26:31' (Bleum); Best 27:40'; Best 29:23' (Scullion); Scullion 35:28' (Marsh); Scullion 51:34' (Marsh); Best 55:18' (Wark)	Report A Report B	P. Marston 13:56' (Taylor); L. Anderson 30:57' (Taylor); E. Reid 39:29' (Taylor); McKenzie 41:46' (Blair)	Stadium: Bayfront Center; Attendance: 5,620

March 12, 1976 2. Regional #1	Tampa Bay Rowdies	9–5	Washington Diplomats	St. Petersburg, Florida
8:30 PM EST	Scullion 12:49'; Garber 22:47' (Marsh); Best 25:16'; Pringle 26:09'; Lindsay 27:20'; Smethurst 28:40' (Marsh); Wark 29:52' (Marsh); Marsh 41:58' (Best); Auguste 42:52'	Report on p. 7C	Trickovic 10:28' (Kerr); Trickovic 10:55'; Kerr 16:24' (Trickovic); Minor 17:58'; Kerr 43:04' (DeLeon)	Stadium: Bayfront Center; Attendance: 4,762; Referee: Rene Imar (USA)

March 13, 1976 3. Regional #2	Tampa Bay Rowdies	5–3	Boston Minutemen	St. Petersburg, Florida
8:30 PM EST	Boston Minutemen og' (3:20); Best 9:47'; Best 18:43' (Garber); Scullion 20:44'; Scullion 32:05' (Best)	Report A Report B	C. McCully 23:51'; Geimer 33:44'; H. McCully 39:41'	Stadium: Bayfront Center; Attendance: 5,785; Referee: Sumpter / Donahue / Imar / Van Der Vygh

March 26, 1976 4. Semifinal	Tampa Bay Rowdies	6–2	Dallas Tornado	St. Petersburg, Florida
8:30 PM EST	Marsh 2:11' (Scullion); Fink 29:21' (Pringle); Scullion 35:21' (Best); Garber 42:03' (Scullion); Best 42:56' (Auguste); Best 43:24' (Scullion)	Report	Chadwick 17:50' (Turner); Pecher 25:00' (Chadwick)	Stadium: Bayfront Center; Attendance: 5,365; Referee: Sumpter / King / Di’pollito

March 27, 1976 5. Final	Tampa Bay Rowdies	6–4	Rochester Lancers	St. Petersburg, Florida
8:30 PM EST	Smethurst 3:37' (Scullion); Lindsay 12:43'; Best 20:11'; Smethurst 30:26' (Best); Smethurst 41:42'; Best 44:58' (Scullion)	Report	Garcia 2:31' (Escos); Escos 9:54'; Silva; Moia 35:43'	Stadium: Bayfront Center, St. Petersburg, Florida; Attendance: 5,787

== Statistics ==
=== Scoring ===
GP = Games Played, G = Goals (worth 2 points), A = Assists (worth 1 point), Pts = Points

Player	GP	G	A	Pts
Clyde Best	5	11	5	27
Stewart Scullion	5	6	6	18
Rodney Marsh	4	4	7	15
Derek Smethurst	4	4	0	8
Randy Garber	5	2	3	7
Mark Lindsay	5	3	0	6
Doug Wark	3	2	1	5
Arsène Auguste	4	1	2	4
Alex Pringle	4	1	1	3
Joey Fink	1	1	0	2
Eddie Austin	1	1	0	2
John Bluem	1	0	1	1

=== Goalkeeping ===
Note: GP = Games played; Min = Minutes played; GA = Goals against; GAA = Goals against average; W = Wins; L = Losses

Player	GP	Min	GA	GAA	W	L
Arnie Mausser	4	160	13	3.66	4	0
Bob Stetler	2	65	5	3.46	1	0

== See also ==
- 1976 team indoor stats
