= 1977 Tampa Bay Rowdies season =

Tampa Bay Rowdies
1977 season
- Owner: (United States) George W. Strawbridge, Jr.
- General manager: (United States) Beau Rodgers
- Head coach: (Italy) Eddie Firmani (resigned July 3) (England) Len Glover (interim) (Scotland) John Boyle (hired July 9)
- Stadium: Tampa Stadium
- NASL: Division: 3rd Playoffs: First round
- U.S. Open Cup: Did not enter
- Top goalscorer: (South Africa) Derek Smethurst (19 goals)
- Highest home attendance: 45,288 (May 29 v. Cosmos)
- Lowest home attendance: 8,398 (July 6 v. Washington)
- Average home league attendance: 19,491
| Home colors | Away colors |

The 1977 season was the original Tampa Bay Rowdies third season of existence, and their third season in the North American Soccer League, the top division of soccer in the United States and Canada at that time.

== Overview ==
The year would see the Rowdies host friendlies against teams from the Soviet Union, Italy and China. The team also took part in the preseason Tournament of Champions, finishing as runners-up. In the NASL season, the Rowdies finished with 131 points and a record of 14–12, which placed them third in the Eastern Division of the Atlantic Conference. The point total qualified them for the playoffs. They lost in the first round of the playoffs to the Cosmos, 3–0. For the second consecutive season Tampa Bay lost in the playoffs to the eventual champion. For the third consecutive season South African striker, Derek Smethurst lead the club in scoring with 19 goals.

== Club ==
=== Roster ===
| No. | Position | Nation | Player |
|---|---|---|---|
| 1 | GK | ENG | Paul Hammond |
| 2 | MF | ENG | Farrukh Quraishi |
| 3 | MF | SCO | Ian Anderson |
| 3 | DF | SCO | Alex Pringle |
| 4 | DF | HAI | Arsène Auguste |
| 5 | DF | CAN | Rino Agostinis |
| 5 | FW | SCO | Davie Robb |
| 6 | DF | RSA | Mike Connell |
| 7 | FW | RSA | Steve Wegerle |
| 8 | MF | CAN | Wes McLeod |
| 9 | FW | AUS | Adrian Alston |
| 10 | FW | ENG | Rodney Marsh |
| 11 | MF | ENG | Len Glover (capt.) |
| 12 | FW | RSA | Derek Smethurst |
| 13 | DF | ENG | Stewart Jump |
| 14 | FW | USA | Joey Fink |
| 15 | MF | ENG | Mark Lindsay |
| 16 | MF | USA | Dennis Wit |
| 17 | DF | USA | Kevin Eagan |
| 18 | GK | USA | Winston DuBose |
| 19 | DF | USA | Frantz St. Lot |
| 20 | FW | USA | Boris Bandov |
| 22 | DF | YUG | Radomir Stefanović |
| 23 | DF | USA | Tony Crudo |

=== Team management ===
Eddie Firmani began the season as head coach, but abruptly resigned on June 3, a few days after a 4–2 victory over the Cosmos. The club’s record was 7–3 at the time. Team captain, Len Glover, who had been sidelined with an injury at the time, served as interim coach for one match, a loss to Rochester on June 5. Retired former Rowdies captain, John Boyle, was hired on June 9. Under Boyle the Rowdies record was 7–8, and though Tampa Bay made the playoffs, Boyle resigned to accept a position as the team’s permanent European scout after the season. For his part, Firmani re-immerged as the Cosmos coach (just as several of his former players had predicted in early June), and ultimately eliminated Tampa Bay, 3–0, in the first round of the 1977 playoffs.

- (United States) George W. Strawbridge, Jr., owner
- (United States) Beau Rodgers, general manager
- (Italy) Eddie Firmani, head coach (resigned June 3)
- (England) Len Glover, head coach (interim)
- (England) John Boyle, head coach (hired June 9)
- (England) Ken Shields, trainer
- (Portugal) Francisco Marcos, public relations director
- (United States) Alfredo Beronda, equipment manager

=== Honors ===
Four Rowdies received individual honors following the 1977 NASL season.

- NASL All-Star, First Team: Derek Smethurst
- NASL All-Star, Second Team: Arsène Auguste
- NASL All-Star, Second Team: Rodney Marsh
- NASL All-Star, Second Team: Steve Wegerle

== Competitions ==
=== Tournament of Champions ===
The inaugural Tournament of Champions was a friendly two-day tournament hosted by the Cosmos at Giants Stadium on April 2 and 3. Four teams participated: the Cosmos, Tampa Bay, Toronto Metros-Croatia and Victory SC of Haiti. In the opening match the Rowdies and Metros-Croatia played to a scoreless draw, before Tampa Bay won using the NASL’s new shoot-out tiebreaker, 2–1. This put the Rowdies into the finals vs. the Cosmos the following day. The Rowdies lost the match, 2–1, and were runners-up. Their lone goal came from Wes McLeod with an assist by Farrukh Quraishi.

==== Series results ====
| Date | Opponent | Venue | Result | Attendance | Scorers |
|---|---|---|---|---|---|
| April 2, 1977 | (Canada) Toronto Metros-Croatia | A | 0–1 (SO) | 7,212 | |
| April 3, 1977 | (United States) Cosmos | A | 2–1 | 11, 098 | Wes McLeod |

=== Other friendlies ===
Tampa Bay hosted three international friendlies in 1977. The first was a, 1–0, losing effort on March 5 versus FC Zenit Leningrad. A crowd of more than 41,000 attended the preseason match. The second international was midseason match-up versus A.S. Roma on June 14. They drew with the Italians, 1–1. Adrian Alston scored for the Rowdies on 30-yard free kick. The third was played on October 13, and pitted the Rowdies against the Chinese National Team. Boris Bandov scored for Tampa Bay in the, 2–1, loss.

The Rowdies also played a postseason friendly versus the Dallas Tornado in Tulsa, Oklahoma five days after the match against China. The game was meant to serve as a test balloon to see if Tulsa would support soccer. Tampa Bay won, 1–0, on an early second half goal by Mark Lindsay. The game drew 11,147 fans. Team Hawaii owner and potato chip magnate, Ward Lay soon moved his club, redubbing them the Tulsa Roughnecks.

==== Results ====
| Date | Opponent | Venue | Result | Attendance | Scorers |
|---|---|---|---|---|---|
| March 5, 1977 | (Soviet Union) FC Zenit Leningrad | Tampa Stadium | 0–1 | 41,680 | |
| June 14, 1977 | (Italy) A.S. Roma | Tampa Stadium | 1–1 | 9,203 | Adrian Alston |
| October 13, 1977 | China National Team | Tampa Stadium | 1–2 | 14,675 | Boris Bandov |
| October 18, 1977 | (United States) Dallas Tornado | Skelly Stadium | 0–1 | 11,147 | Mark Lindsay |

=== North American Soccer League season ===
The Rowdies finished the regular season with 131 points placing them in 3rd place in the Eastern Division of the Atlantic Conference, and 7th out of 18 teams in the league overall. After a 7–3 start to the season, which put them at the top of the league standings, Tampa Bay limped home with a 7–9 record the rest of the way for a record of 14–12. The team’s midseason slump coincided exactly with Eddie Firmani’s abrupt resignation as head coach. The club averaged 19,491 fans per game, with three matches surpassing 21,000, one reaching 33,000 and still another topping 45,000.

==== Regular-season standings ====
W = Wins, L = Losses, GF = Goals For, GA = Goals Against, BP = Bonus Points, Pts= point system

6 points for a win, 0 points for a loss, 1 point for each regulation goal scored up to three per game.

-League Premiers (most points). -Other playoff teams.

| Eastern Division | W | L | GF | GA | BP | Pts | Home | Road |
|---|---|---|---|---|---|---|---|---|
| Fort Lauderdale Strikers | 19 | 7 | 49 | 29 | 47 | 161 | 11-2 | 8-5 |
| Cosmos | 15 | 11 | 60 | 39 | 50 | 140 | 10-3 | 5-8 |
| Tampa Bay Rowdies | 14 | 12 | 55 | 45 | 47 | 131 | 11-2 | 3-10 |
| Washington Diplomats | 10 | 16 | 32 | 49 | 32 | 92 | 6-7 | 4-9 |

==== Regular season results ====
| Date | Opponent | Venue | Result | Attendance | Scorers |
|---|---|---|---|---|---|
| April 9, 1977 | Dallas Tornado | A | 2–1 | 15,212 | Rodney Marsh |
| April 16, 1977 | Chicago Sting | H | 4–0 | 33,484 | Derek Smethurst (2), Adrian Alston (2) |
| April 24, 1977 | Washington Diplomats | A | 0–1 | 9,099 | Rodney Marsh |
| April 30, 1977 | Rochester Lancers | H | 3–1 | 21,426 | Derek Smethurst (2), Steve Wegerle |
| May 7, 1977 | Fort Lauderdale Strikers | H | 1–0 | 24,753 | Rodney Marsh |
| May 13, 1977 | Connecticut Bicentennials | H | 4–0 | 12,759 | Derek Smethurst (2), Adrian Alston, Steve Wegerle |
| May 15, 1977 | Connecticut Bicentennials | A | 1–4 | 1,520 | Derek Smethurst (2), Adrian Alston, Mark Lindsay |
| May 20, 1977 | Chicago Sting | A | 3–4 | 3,233 | Derek Smethurst (2), Adrian Alston |
| May 22, 1977 | Toronto Metros-Croatia | A | 4–0 | 7,649 | |
| May 29, 1977 | Cosmos | H | 4–2 | 45,288 | Steve Wegerle (2), Ian Anderson, Rodney Marsh |
| June 5, 1977 | Rochester Lancers | A | 2–0 | 5,247 | |
| June 11, 1977 | Vancouver Whitecaps | H | 1–2 | 15,225 | Derek Smethurst |
| June 19, 1977 | Cosmos | A | 3–1 | 62,394 | Wes McLeod |
| June 22, 1977 | Team Hawaii | H | 4–3 (SO) | 10,220 | Adrian Alston, David Robb, Ian Anderson |
| June 25, 1977 | Seattle Sounders | A | 3–0 | 22,388 | |
| June 27, 1977 | San Jose Earthquakes | A | 1–4 | 17,612 | Derek Smethurst (2), Rodney Marsh, David Robb |
| July 1, 1977 | Fort Lauderdale Strikers | A | 3–2 | 9325 | Steve Wegerle, David Robb |
| July 6, 1977 | Washington Diplomats | H | 1–2 | 8,398 | Derek Smethurst |
| July 9, 1977 | Las Vegas Quicksilvers | H | 4–1 | 12,123 | Smethurst, Auguste, Marsh, Alston |
| July 13, 1977 | Los Angeles Aztecs | H | 4–1 | 16,133 | Derek Smethurst (3), David Robb |
| July 16, 1977 | Minnesota Kicks | A | 1–0 | 36,302 | |
| July 20, 1977 | Portland Timbers | H | 3–2 (OT) | 14,230 | David Robb, Derek Smethurst, Rodney Marsh |
| July 23, 1977 | Toronto Metros-Croatia | H | 2–0 | 17,473 | Arsène Auguste, David Robb |
| July 27, 1977 | Portland Timbers | A | 4–1 | 13,328 | David Robb |
| July 30, 1977 | St. Louis Stars | H | 3–2 (SO) | 21,876 | Rodney Marsh, David Robb |
| August 5, 1977 | St. Louis Stars | A | 1–0 | 9,158 | |

==== Playoff results ====
| Date | Opponent | Venue | Result | Attendance | Scorers |
|---|---|---|---|---|---|
| August 10, 1977 | Cosmos | A | 3–0 | 57,828 | |

== Statistics ==
=== Season scoring ===
GP = Games Played, G = Goals (worth 2 points), A = Assists (worth 1 point), Pts = Points

| Player | GP | G | A | Pts |
|---|---|---|---|---|
| Derek Smethurst | 21 | 19 | 4 | 42 |
| Rodney Marsh | 24 | 8 | 11 | 27 |
| Steve Wegerle | 25 | 5 | 11 | 25 |
| David Robb | 15 | 8 | 1 | 17 |
| Adrian Alston | 17 | 7 | 3 | 17 |
| Wes McLeod | 20 | 1 | 5 | 7 |
| Mark Lindsay | 20 | 1 | 3 | 5 |
| Arsène Auguste | 14 | 2 | 0 | 4 |
| Ian Anderson | 11 | 2 | 0 | 4 |
| Len Glover | 19 | 0 | 3 | 3 |
| Mike Connell | 26 | 0 | 1 | 1 |
| Dennis Wit | 7 | 0 | 1 | 1 |
| Paul Hammond | 24 | 0 | 0 | 0 |
| Stewart Jump | 22 | 0 | 0 | 0 |
| Kevin Eagan | 21 | 0 | 0 | 0 |
| Farrukh Quraishi | 14 | 0 | 0 | 0 |
| Joey Fink | 13 | 0 | 0 | 0 |
| Boris Bandov | 5 | 0 | 0 | 0 |
| Frantz St. Lot | 5 | 0 | 0 | 0 |
| Winston DuBose | 3 | 0 | 0 | 0 |
| Radomir Stefanović | 2 | 0 | 0 | 0 |
| Alex Pringle | 1 | 0 | 0 | 0 |
| Rino Agostinis | 0 | 0 | 0 | 0 |

=== Season goalkeeping ===
Note: GP = Games played; Min = Minutes played; GA = Goals against; GAA = Goals against average; W = Wins; L = Losses

| Player | GP | Min | Svs | GA | GAA | W | L |
|---|---|---|---|---|---|---|---|
| Paul Hammond | 24 | 2185 | 174 | 41 | 1.69 | 13 | 11 |
| Winston DuBose | 3 | 196 | 22 | 4 | 1.83 | 1 | 1 |

== Player movement ==
=== In ===
| No. | Pos. | Player | Transferred from | Fee/notes | Date | Source |
|---|---|---|---|---|---|---|
| 5 | DF | (Canada) Rino Agostinis | (Canada) Vancouver Columbus | none | March 2, 1977 | |
| 5 | FW | (Scotland) David Robb | (Scotland) Aberdeen F.C. | on loan | May 16, 1977 | |
| 3 | MF | (Scotland) Ian Anderson | (Scotland) St. Johnstone F.C. | on loan | May 16, 1977 | |
| 20 | FW | (United States) Boris Bandov | (United States) Seattle Sounders | no details | July 24, 1977 | |
| 22 | DF | (Socialist Federal Republic of Yugoslavia) Radomir Stefanović | (Socialist Federal Republic of Yugoslavia) HNK Rijeka | arrived July 29, 1977 | July 19, 1977 | |

=== Out ===
| No. | Pos. | Player | Transferred to | Fee/notes | Date | Source |
|---|---|---|---|---|---|---|
| 1 | GK | (United States) Arnie Mausser | (Canada) Vancouver Whitecaps | sold contract | April 2, 1977 | |
| 3 | DF | (England) Alex Pringle | (United States) Washington Diplomats | sold contract | April 10, 1977 | |
| 5 | DF | (Canada) Rino Agostinis | none | released from team | May 2, 1977 | |

== See also ==
- 1977 North American Soccer League season
- 1977 in American soccer
- Tampa Bay Rowdies (1975–1993)
