= 1977 Tampa Bay Rowdies indoor season =

Tampa Bay Rowdies
1977 indoor season
- Owner: (United States) George W. Strawbridge, Jr.
- General manager: (United States) Beau Rodgers
- Manager: (Italy) Eddie Firmani
- Stadium: Bayfront Center
- Top goalscorer: League: All: (South Africa) Derek Smethurst (5 goals)
- Highest home attendance: 6,354 (March 9 vs. Zenit)
- Lowest home attendance: 5,016 (Feb. 27 vs. Strikers)
- Average home league attendance: 5,685
Home colors	Away colors

The 1977 Tampa Bay Rowdies indoor season was the third indoor season of the club's existence.

== Overview ==
Despite much lobbying from Rowdies owner, George W. Strawbridge, Jr., the North American Soccer League voted not to sanction an indoor season or tournament in 1977. As such, Tampa Bay played only two indoor matches that year. The first one versus the Fort Lauderdale Strikers was played on February 27. This marked the first meeting of what would soon become one of the most enduring rivalries in North American soccer, the Florida Derby. The Rowdies' other match was an international friendly against Zenit Leningrad on March 9. At the time Zenit was the reigning champion of the Soviet indoor league. Likewise, the Rowdies were the defending NASL indoor champs. Both matches were played at the Bayfront Center in St. Petersburg, Florida.

Originally Tampa Bay had planned on playing FC Dynamo Moscow, but the match was canceled because of government delays in the Soviet Union. The Rowdies were also the first NASL side to ever be invited to the Wembley Indoor Invitational in mid June. The ten-team tournament featured five English clubs, plus other top squads from Europe. Although they originally planned to attend the London event, ultimately the tournament was canceled and the Rowdies scheduled an outdoor international friendly in Tampa versus A.S. Roma instead.

== Longterm cultural significance ==
Not only was this brief indoor season the flash-point for one of the longest running professional soccer derbies in North America as previously mentioned, but it was significant for another reason. When Ed Tepper approached Earl Foreman about starting a fully professional indoor-only soccer league, he used a videotape of the 1977 Rowdies–Zenit Leningrad match to show not only the game's potential, but also the crowd's enthusiastic responses to the end-to-end action. By October 1977 the pair announced the formation of the Major Indoor Soccer League. That league would grow to become the sport's standard bearer for many years, even gaining a regular slot in the ESPN programming line up, before finally folding in 1992. Today, though most popular in North America, indoor soccer is played throughout the world, with its own FIFA-like governing body. The World Minifootball Federation, based in the Czech Republic, is the international federation dedicated to promoting the sport.

== Club ==
=== Roster ===
No.	Position	Nation	Player
1	GK	ENG	Paul Hammond
1	GK	USA	Arnie Mausser
1	GK	USA	Winston DuBose
2	DF	ENG	Farrukh Quraishi
3	DF	SCO	Alex Pringle (capt.)
4	DF	HAI	Arsène Auguste
5	DF	CAN	Rino Agostinis
6	DF	RSA	Mike Connell
7	MF	RSA	Steve Wegerle
8	MF	CAN	Wes McLeod
9	FW	AUS	Adrian Alston
10	FW	ENG	Rodney Marsh
11	FW	ENG	Len Glover
12	FW	RSA	Derek Smethurst
14	FW	USA	Joey Fink
15	MF	ENG	Mark Lindsay
16	DF	USA	Dennis Wit
17	FW	USA	Kevin Eagan
19	DF	USA	Frantz St. Lot

=== Management and technical staff ===
- (United States) George Strawbridge, Jr., owner
- (United States) Beau Rogers, general manager
- (Italy) Eddie Firmani, head coach
- (United States) Chas Serednesky, business manager
- (Portugal) Francisco Marcos, director of public relations
- (United States) Alfredo Beronda, equipment manager

== Competitions ==
=== Match reports ===
February 27, 1977 1	Tampa Bay Rowdies	9–8	Fort Lauderdale Strikers	St. Petersburg, Florida
8:00 p.m. (EST)	Lindsay 4:21' (Wegerle); Smethurst 33:13'; Smethurst 34:04' (Alston); Quraishi 41:34' (Smethurst); Smethurst 41:57' (Wegerle); Wegerle 48:29'; Smethurst 49:30' (Wegerle); Wegerle 50:41'; Alston 51:47' (Smethurst)	Report	Mulroy 12:07' (Nanchoff, Sharp); Sharp 12:27'; Nanchoff 26:40' (Chadwick); Ceballos 44:20' (Sharp); Chadwick 47:40' (Hamlyn, Sharp); Sharp 50:41'; Sharp 58:04'; Hamlyn 59:57'	Stadium: Bayfront Center; Attendance: 5,016; Referee: Sam Hornich

March 9, 1977 2 Int’l friendly	Tampa Bay Rowdies	7–8	Zenit Leningrad	St. Petersburg, Florida
8:00 p.m. (EST)	Wegerle 6:51' (Connell); Marsh 13:32'; Marsh 14:33' (Wit, Quraishi); Smethurst 15:43' (Quraishi); Glover 31:13'; Marsh 33:02' (Alston); Marsh 47:25' (Pringle)	Report 1 Report 2	Lokhov 3:47' (Davydov); Jakimtsev 10:42', 42:26'; Orlov 17:11' (Golubev, Jakimtsev); Rasputin 21:48'; Davydov 32:31' (Markin); Jakimtsev 42:26'; Lokhov 56:11'; Golubev 56:47'	Stadium: Bayfront Center; Attendance: 6,354; Referee: Rene Imar (USA)

== Statistics ==
G = Goals (worth 2 points), A = Assists (worth 1 point), Pts = Points

Player	G	A	Pts
Derek Smethurst	5	2	12
Steve Wegerle	3	3	9
Rodney Marsh	4	0	8
Adrian Alston	1	2	4
Farrukh Quraishi	1	2	4
Len Glover	1	0	2
Mark Lindsay	1	0	2
Dennis Wit	0	1	1
Alex Pringle	0	1	1
Mike Connell	0	1	1
Rino Agostinis	0	0	0

== See also ==
- 1977 team indoor stats
