= Soccer Bowl '75 =

Soccer match

- Event: Soccer Bowl
Tampa Bay Rowdies	Portland Timbers
2	0
- Date: August 24, 1975
- Venue: Spartan Stadium, San Jose, California
- Man of the Match: Stewart Jump
- Referee: Henry Landauer (United States)
- Attendance: 17,483

Soccer Bowl '75 was the championship final of the 1975 NASL season, played between the Tampa Bay Rowdies and the Portland Timbers. The match took place on August 24, 1975 at Spartan Stadium, in San Jose, California. It was the first North American Soccer League championship to be known as the Soccer Bowl. The Tampa Bay Rowdies won the match, 2–0, to claim their first North American championship. This was the third consecutive year that an expansion team won the NASL title.

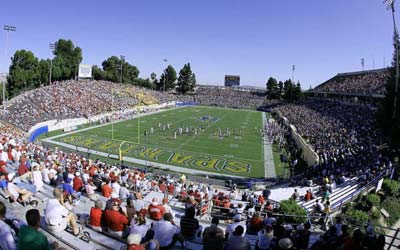
Spartan Stadium was the venue for Soccer Bowl '75

== Background ==
=== Tampa Bay Rowdies ===
The Tampa Bay Rowdies qualified for the playoffs by virtue of winning the Eastern Division with 135 points. The point total earned them the number 2 seed and the right to host all preliminary rounds of the playoffs. The Rowdies defeated the Toronto Metros-Croatia in the quarterfinal match, 1–0, on August 13, 1975. Three days later they dispatched the Miami Toros, 3–0, in their semifinal game played on August 16, 1975, to advance to the finals.

=== Portland Timbers ===
The Portland Timbers qualified for the playoffs by virtue of winning the Western Division with 138 points. The point total earned them the number 1 seed and the right to host all preliminary rounds of the playoffs. The Timbers defeated the Seattle Sounders in the quarterfinal match, 2–1, in sudden death overtime on August 12, 1975. Five days later they beat the St. Louis Stars, 1–0, in a semifinal game played on August 17, 1975, to advance to the finals.

== Match details ==
August 24
12:30 p.m. PDT

Tampa Bay Rowdies	2–0	Portland Timbers
Auguste 66:00' (Smethurst); Best 87:40' (Smethurst)	Report

Spartan Stadium, San Jose, California
Attendance: 17,483
Referee: (United States) Henry Landauer

TB Rowdies	Portland Timbers

GK	1	(England) Paul Hammond
D	13	(England) Stewart Jump
D	3	(Scotland) Alex Pringle
D	6	(South Africa) Mike Connell
D	5	(England) Malcolm Linton		(substituted off) 63:00'
M	4	(Scotland) John Boyle (c)
M	15	(England) Mark Lindsay
F	9	(Bermuda) Clyde Best
F	10	(Scotland) Stewart Scullion	(yellow card) 6'
F	12	(South Africa) Derek Smethurst
F	14	(England) John Sissons
Substitutes:
D	18	(Haiti) Arsène Auguste		(substituted on) 63:00'
D	2	(England) Farrukh Quarishi
M	7	(South Africa) Bernard Hartze
M	8	(United States) Randy Garber
F	11	(United States) Doug Wark
F	17	(United States) Eddie Austin
GK	1	(Scotland) Mike Hewitt
Manager:
(Italy) Eddie Firmani

GK	1	(England) Graham Brown
D	2	(England) Ray Martin
D	3	(England) Barrie Lynch
D	5	(England) Graham Day
M	6	(Wales) Brian Godfrey (c)	(yellow card) 85'
M	7	(Scotland) Thomas McLaren
M	8	(England) Barry Powell
M	13	(England) Chris Dangerfield		(substituted off) 74:00'
F	9	(England) Peter Withe	(yellow card) 67'
F	11	(Northern Ireland) Jimmy Kelly
F	12	(England) Willie Anderson
Substitutes:
D	4	(United States) Mick Hoban
D	18	(Canada) Nick Nicolas
F	10	(Jamaica) Dan Gardner
F	14	(England) Tony Betts		(substituted on) 74:00'
F	16	(United States) Roger Goldingay
GK	22	(Canada) Dave Landry
Manager:
(Wales) Vic Crowe

1975 NASL Champions: Tampa Bay Rowdies
Television: CBS
Announcers: Frank Glieber, Jack Whitaker

Soccer Bowl MVP:
Stewart Jump (Tampa Bay)
Assistant referees:
John Davies
Cor de Groot

== Match statistics ==
First half
Statistic	Tampa Bay	Portland
Goals scored	0	0
Total shots	9	8
Shots on target	2	6
Saves	6	2
Offsides	0	0
Yellow cards	1	0
Red cards	0	0

Second half
Statistic	Tampa Bay	Portland
Goals scored	2	0
Total shots	10	10
Shots on target	6	6
Saves	6	4
Offsides	0	0
Yellow cards	0	2
Red cards	0	0

Overall
Statistic	Tampa Bay	Portland
Goals scored	2	0
Total shots	19	18
Shots on target	8	12
Saves	12	6
Offsides	0	0
Yellow cards	1	2
Red cards	0	0
Fouls	25	21
Corner kicks	8	4

== See also ==
- 1975 North American Soccer League season
