= 1976 NASL Indoor tournament =

Indoor soccer tournament

North American Soccer League -1976 Indoor Tournament-
NASL Indoor Tournament

Tournament details
- Dates: March 12, 1976 – March 27, 1976
- Teams: 12

Final positions
- Champions: Tampa Bay Rowdies (1st title)
- Runners-up: Rochester Lancers

Tournament statistics
- Matches played: 16
- Goals scored: 175 (10.94 per match)
- Top scorer: (United States) Juli Veee (8 goals)
- Best player: (Bermuda) Clyde Best (Tampa Bay)

Over the course of three weekends in March 1976, the North American Soccer League hosted its second league-wide indoor soccer tournament. Twelve of the twenty NASL teams participated.

== Overview ==
In 1976, instead of playing a full indoor schedule (and despite the hopes of Tampa Bay owner George Strawbridge, Jr.), the North American Soccer League opted to stage a two-tiered indoor tournament for the second consecutive year. Of the league's 20 teams, 12 participated in three regions, which was down from 16 in four regions in the previous year's tournament. The regional winners along with the "best" second-place team would advance to the final four in St. Petersburg, Florida. While the goals remained 4 × 16, the games would be shortened to three 15-minute periods, instead of the 20-minute frames played the previous year. The tournament also saw the first-ever indoor overtime and penalty shootout, as Miami and Boston played to a 6–6 draw in the opening match. After 45 minutes of regulation time and two 5-minute golden goal extra sessions, the match was ultimately decided by spot kicks.

Playing in their home arena, the Bayfront Center, the Tampa Bay Rowdies defeated the Rochester Lancers 6–4 in the Championship Final. Juli Veee of San Jose scored eight goals to lead the tournament, while Clyde Best of Tampa Bay earned the MVP honors.

== Map of clubs ==
Eastern Regional Midwest Regional Western Regional

== 1976 Indoor Regional tournaments ==
=== Eastern Regional ===
played at the Bayfront Center in St. Petersburg, Florida

March 12	Miami Toros	7–6 (PK, 4–3)	Boston Minutemen	Attendance: 4,762

March 12	Tampa Bay Rowdies	9–5	Washington Diplomats

March 13	Washington Diplomats	9–3	Miami Toros	Attendance: 5,785

March 13	Tampa Bay Rowdies	5–3	Boston Minutemen

Pos	Team	G	W	L	GF	GA	GD	PTS
1	Tampa Bay Rowdies	2	2	0	14	8	+6	4
2	Washington Diplomats	2	1	1	14	12	+2	2
3	Miami Toros	2	1	1	9	15	–6	2
4	Boston Minutemen	2	0	2	9	11	–2	0

*Tampa Bay wins region, advances to semifinals

- East Regional MVP: (Scotland) Stewart Scullion (Tampa Bay) – 3 goals, 1 assist
- All-Regional Team: (United States) Stojan Trickovic (Washington), (Canada) John Kerr (Washington), (England) Rodney Marsh (Tampa Bay), (Haiti) Arsène Auguste (Tampa Bay), (Scotland) Stewart Scullion (Tampa Bay), (United States) Shep Messing (Boston)

=== Midwest Regional ===
played at International Amphitheatre in Chicago, Illinois

March 13	Toronto Metros-Croatia	8–6	St. Louis Stars	Attendance: 1,700 (est.)

March 13	Rochester Lancers	5–2	Chicago Sting

March 14	Rochester Lancers	5–4	St. Louis Stars	Attendance: 1,700 (est.)

March 14	Chicago Sting	6–2	Toronto Metros-Croatia

Pos	Team	G	W	L	GF	GA	GD	PTS
1	Rochester Lancers	2	2	0	10	6	+4	4
2	Chicago Sting	2	1	1	8	7	+1	2
3	Toronto Metros-Croatia	2	1	1	10	12	–2	2
4	St. Louis Stars	2	0	2	10	13	–3	0

*Rochester wins region, advances to semifinals

- Midwest Regional MVP: (United States) Mario Garcia (Rochester) – 5 goals
- All-Regional Team: (United States) Mario Garcia (Rochester), (Socialist Federal Republic of Yugoslavia) Bobby Ranogejec (Chicago), (United States) Pat McBride (St. Louis) (United States) Jim May (Rochester)

=== West Regional ===
played at the Cow Palace in Daly City, California

March 19	Dallas Tornado	5–2	San Diego Jaws	Attendance: 6,671

March 19	San Jose Earthquakes	18–6	Vancouver Whitecaps

March 21	Dallas Tornado	11–2	Vancouver Whitecaps	Attendance: 5,438

March 21	San Jose Earthquakes	8–4	San Diego Jaws

Pos	Team	G	W	L	GF	GA	GD	PTS
1	San Jose Earthquakes	2	2	0	26	10	+16	4
2	Dallas Tornado	2	2	0	16	4	+12	4
3	San Diego Jaws	2	0	2	6	13	–7	0
4	Vancouver Whitecaps	2	0	2	8	29	–21	0

*San Jose wins region on goal differential, while Dallas is the top second-place team in any region, so both advance to semifinals

- West Regional MVP: (United States) Juli Veee (San Jose) – 5 goals, 5 assists
- All-Regional Team: (United States) Juli Veee (San Jose), (United States) Paul Child (San Jose), (United States) Roy Turner (Dallas), (England) David Chadwick (Dallas), (United States) Archie Roboostoff (San Diego), (United States) Mike Ivanow (San Jose)

== 1976 Indoor Final Four ==
=== Bracket ===
Semifinals
M1	Rochester Lancers	6
W1	San Jose Earthquakes	4
E1	Tampa Bay Rowdies	6
W2	Dallas Tornado	2

Championship Final
M1	Rochester Lancers	4
E1	Tampa Bay Rowdies	6
Third place
W1	San Jose Earthquakes	5
W2	Dallas Tornado	2

=== Semi-finals ===
played at the Bayfront Center in St. Petersburg, Florida

March 26	Rochester Lancers	6–4	San Jose Earthquakes	Attendance: 5,365

March 26	Tampa Bay Rowdies	6–2	Dallas Tornado

=== Third-place match ===
played at the Bayfront Center in St. Petersburg, Florida

March 27	San Jose Earthquakes	5–2	Dallas Tornado

=== Championship final ===
March 27, 1976
8:30 PM EST

Tampa Bay Rowdies	6–4	Rochester Lancers
Smethurst (3:37); Lindsay (12:43); Best (20:11); Smethurst (30:26); Smethurst (41:42); Best (44:58)	Report 1 Report 2	Garcia (2:31); Escos (9:54); Silva; Moia (35:43)

Bayfront Center, St. Petersburg, Florida, St. Petersburg, Florida
Attendance: 5,787
Referee: Larry King / Gino D'Ippolito / Rene Imar

1976 NASL Indoor Champions: Tampa Bay Rowdies

== Final Four awards ==
- Most Valuable Player: (Bermuda) Clyde Best (Tampa Bay) – Games: 4; Goals: 7; Assists: 4 Total points: 18
- All-tournament Team: (Bermuda) Clyde Best (Tampa Bay), (United States) Juli Veee (San Jose), (South Africa) Derek Smethurst (Tampa Bay), (Portugal) João Pedro (Rochester), (Scotland) Stewart Scullion (Tampa Bay), (United States) Jim May (Rochester)

== Final team rankings ==
G = Games, W = Wins, L = Losses, GF = Goals For, GA = Goals Against, GD = Goal Differential

Pos	Team	G	W	L	GF	GA	GD
1	Tampa Bay Rowdies	4	4	0	26	14	+12
2	Rochester Lancers	4	3	1	20	16	+4
3	San Jose Earthquakes	4	3	1	35	18	+17
4	Dallas Tornado	4	2	2	20	15	+5
5	Washington Diplomats	2	1	1	14	12	+2

== Non-tournament matches ==
In addition to the tournament itself, a few teams staged other indoor matches as tune-ups for both the outdoor season and the indoor tournament itself.

=== Match reports ===
March 6, 1976 1 Int'l friendly	Tampa Bay Rowdies	11–4	Santos F.C. (Jamaica)	St. Petersburg, Florida
7:30 PM (EST)	Wark (8:08); Austin (14:11); Lindsay (17:19); Best (24:13); Marsh (25:54); Marsh (26:31); Best (27:40); Best (29:23); Scullion (35:28); Scullion (51:34); Best (55:18)	Report 1 Report 2	P. Marston (13:56); L. Anderson (30:57); E. Reid (39:29); McKenzie (41:46)	Stadium: Bayfront Center; Attendance: 5,620

March 17, 1976 2	San Jose Earthquakes	9–4	Dallas Tornado	Daly City, California
	Child, Kemp, Samuelsson, B. Demling; Moore; Mitić	Report 1 Report 2	Chadwick, (pen.), Cohen	Stadium: Cow Palace; Attendance: 3,983

April 8, 1976 3	Philadelphia Atoms	4–3	Washington Diplomats	Philadelphia, Pennsylvania
	Herrada (7:05); Navarro (21:53); Galati (32:05); López (39:45)	Report 1 Archived August 4, 2018, at the Wayback Machine; Report 2 Report 3	Minor (26:52); Grell (27:04); Minor (33:40)	Stadium: Spectrum; Attendance: 4,234
