= 1980 Washington Diplomats season =

Washington Diplomats
1980 season
- General manager: Steve Danzansky
- Head coach: Gordon Bradley
- Stadium: RFK Stadium
- NASL: Overall: 8th Division: 4th Conference: 2nd
- NASL Playoffs: First round
- National Challenge Cup: Did not enter
- Top goalscorer: League: Green (25); All: Green (25)
Home colors	Away colors

The 1980 Washington Diplomats season was the club's ninth season of existence, their ninth season in the North American Soccer League and their ninth season in the then-top tier of American soccer. The Dips played in the NASL's Eastern Division of the National Conference, and finished the season placed second in the division, behind the New York Cosmos.

The Dips qualified for the 1980 NASL Playoffs, but lost in the first round to the Los Angeles Aztecs in extra time of the second leg.

== Background ==
During the 1979 season, the Dips finished second the Eastern Conference of the National Division. They compiled a record of 19 wins and 11 defeats with 68 goals for and 50 scored against. Their record earned the Dips a berth into the 1979 NASL Playoffs, where they lost 2–0 in games to the Los Angeles Aztecs.

== Squad ==
The following players were contracted by the Washington Diplomats for part of the 1980 season.

Squad No.	Name	Nationality	Position(s)	Previous club
Goalkeepers
0	Dragan Radovich	(Socialist Federal Republic of Yugoslavia)	GK	(United States) St. Francis Brooklyn Terriers
31	Bill Irwin	(Northern Ireland)	GK	(Wales) Cardiff City
Defenders
2	Robert Iarusci	(Canada)	DF	(United States) New York Cosmos
3	Tommy O'Hara	(Scotland)	DF	(Scotland) Queen of the South
8	Jim Steele	(Scotland)	DF	(England) Southampton
11	Nick Mijatović	(Socialist Federal Republic of Yugoslavia)	DF	(United States) Rochester Lancers
16	Barney Boyce	(United States)	DF	
18	Kip Germain	(United States)	DF	(United States) William & Mary Tribe
19	Don Droege	(United States)	DF	(United States) Rochester Lancers
20	Mike Dillon	(England)	DF	(England) Cheshunt
21	Carmine Posillico	(United States)	DF	(United States) Mercer Vikings
26	Ane Mihailovich	(Socialist Federal Republic of Yugoslavia)	DF	(United States) Los Angeles Aztecs
Midfielders
4	Juan Lozano	(Spain)	MF	(Belgium) Beerschot
5	Carmine Marcantonio	(Italy)	MF	(Canada) Toronto Metros-Croatia
6	Sakib Viteškić	(Socialist Federal Republic of Yugoslavia)	MF	(Netherlands) Maastricht
7	Thomas Rongen	(Netherlands)	MF	(United States) Los Angeles Aztecs
9	József Horváth	(Hungary)	MF	(United States) Rochester Lancers
10	Gary Darrell	(Bermuda)	MF	(Canada) Montreal Olympique
12	Wim Jansen	(Netherlands)	MF	(Netherlands) Feyenoord
14	Johan Cruyff	(Netherlands)	MF	(United States) Los Angeles Aztecs
29	Danny Molendyk	(Netherlands)	MF	(United States) Washington Huskies
Forwards
7	Art Welch	(Jamaica)	FW	(United States) Wichita Wings
13	Tony Crescitelli	(Italy)	FW	(United States) North Adams State Trailblazers
15	Ken Mokgojoa	(South Africa)	FW	(South Africa) Benoni United
17	Sonny Askew	(United States)	FW	(United States) Essex Knights
22	Steve Byrd	(United States)	FW	
23	Mario Benito Luna	(Argentina)	FW	
25	Bobby Stokes	(England)	FW	(England) Portsmouth
28	Alan Green	(England)	FW	(England) Coventry City

== Competitions ==
=== NASL ===
August 27 Game 1	Washington Diplomats	1–0	Los Angeles Aztecs	Washington, D.C.
8:00 pm EDT	Stokes 23' (Cruyff)			Stadium: RFK Stadium; Attendance: 20,231; Referee: Gino D'Ippolito (USA)

August 30 Game 2	Los Angeles Aztecs	1–1 (a.e.t.) (5–4 p)	Washington Diplomats	Los Angeles
7:30 pm PDT	Fernando 61' (Merrick)	Report	Rongen 84' (Droege)	Stadium: Rose Bowl; Attendance: 14,163; Referee: Warner Winsemann (Canada)
	Penalties
	(penalty missed) Fernando; (penalty scored) Van Veen; (penalty scored) Keri; (penalty scored) Sibbald; (penalty scored) Etherington; (penalty scored) Aguirre		(penalty scored) O'Hara; (penalty missed) Iarusci; (penalty scored) Cruyff; (penalty scored) Droege; (penalty scored) Rongen; (penalty missed) Mokgojoa

August 30 Mini-Game	Los Angeles Aztecs	2–0	Washington Diplomats	Los Angeles
	Simic 10' (McGrane); Simic 26'			Stadium: Rose Bowl; Attendance: 14,163
