= Kevin Welsh =

Kevin Welsh may refer to:

- Kevin Welsh (American soccer) (born 1953)
- Kevin Welsh (Scottish footballer) (born 1984)
