= Shakib =

Shakib, Sakib
- Pronunciation: Persian pronunciation: [ʃakiːb] Arabic pronunciation: [θaːqib]
- Gender: Male

Origin
- Origin: Persian, Arabic
- Meaning: "Patience", "Piercing"
- Region of origin: Iran, Levant, Bangladesh

Shakib (Persian: شکیب, romanized: Šakīb, lit. 'patience') and Sakib (Arabic: ثَاقِب, romanized: Ṯāqib, lit. 'piercing') are both masculine given names and surnames. Shakib comes from the Persian word for patience (Persian: شکیبائی, romanized: Šakībâ'i, lit. 'patience') and Sakib comes from Arabic and means "piercing".

The word "Ṯāqibu" is mentioned in the Quran in the chapter of At-Tariq, verse 3.

ٱلنَّجْمُ ٱلثَّاقِبُ
al-najmu al-ṯāqibu
(It is) the star of piercing (brightness).

— Third verse, Sura Aṭ-Ṭāriq

The name is often mistranslated as "Star", due to being used as the adjective of "star" (Arabic: نجم, romanized: Najm) in the aforementioned verse. Notable people with the name include:

== Given name ==
=== Sakib ===
- Sakibul Gani (born 1999), Indian cricketer
- Sakib Mahmuljin (born 1952), Bosnian military leader
- Sakib Viteškić (born 1952), Bosnian footballer

=== Shakib ===
- Shakib Al Hasan (born 1987), Bangladeshi cricketer
- Shakib Arslan (1869–1946), Druze prince from Lebanon
- Shakib Khan (born 1979), Bangladeshi film actor and producer
- Shakib Cham Lutaaya (born 1992), Ugandan entrepreneur
- Shakib Qortbawi (born 1945), Lebanese businessman and politician

== Surname ==
- Siba Shakib, Iranian/German filmmaker, writer and political activist
