= Peter Smethurst =

South African soccer player

Personal information
- Full name: Peter Joseph Smethurst
- Date of birth: 8 August 1940 (age 86)
- Place of birth: Durban, South Africa
- Position: Inside forward

Senior career*
Years	Team	Apps	(Gls)
1959	Durban City		
1959–1960	Blackpool	1	(0)
1961–1965	Hamilton Steelers		
1965	New York Ukrainians		
- * Club domestic league appearances and goals

Peter Joseph Smethurst (born 8 August 1940) is a South African retired professional soccer player who played as an inside forward in South Africa, England and Canada.

== Career ==
Smethurst played with Durban City F.C. in the National Football League. In 1959, he played in the Football League First Division with Blackpool F.C. In 1961, he played in the Eastern Canada Professional Soccer League with Hamilton Steelers. Throughout his tenure with Hamilton he played in six seasons and finished as the club's top goalscorer. On 21 January 1965, he signed a contract with New York Ukrainians in the German-American Soccer League, and returned to Hamilton for the remainder of the season.

== Personal life ==
His brother Derek was also a footballer in the North American Soccer League.
