= Bob Stetler =

American soccer player

Personal information
- Full name: Robert Alan Stetler
- Date of birth: October 10, 1952
- Place of birth: East Stroudsburg, Pennsylvania, United States
- Date of death: July 1990 (aged 38)
- Place of death: United States
- Height: 6 ft 1 in (1.85 m)
- Position: Goalkeeper

College career
Years	Team	Apps	(Gls)
1973–1974	East Stroudsburg Warriors		

Senior career*
Years	Team	Apps	(Gls)
1975–1976	Tampa Bay Rowdies	4	(0)
1975–1976	Tampa Bay Rowdies (indoor)	2	(0)
1977–1979	Washington Diplomats	12	(0)
1980	Memphis Rogues	27	(0)
1980–1981	Phoenix Inferno (indoor)	1	(0)
1981	San Jose Earthquakes	8	(0)
- * Club domestic league appearances and goals

Bob Stetler was an American soccer goalkeeper who played professionally in the North American Soccer League and the Major Indoor Soccer League.

== Youth ==
Stetler graduated from Stroudsburg High School where he was a Pennsylvania Interscholastic Athletic Association wrestling champion. He began his college career with Huron College before transferring to East Stroudsburg State University his junior year where he both played soccer and wrestled. He was a 1974 Third Team and 1975 Second Team Division II All American wrestler. In 1974, he placed third in the 158 lb. division of the NCAA Division II national championship.

== Professional ==
In 1975, he signed with the Tampa Bay Rowdies of the North American Soccer League. He spent the 1975 season as an amateur, then turned professional in 1976. Settler did not play during the 1975 indoor season, but did appear in two games during the Rowdies' championship 1976 indoor campaign, starting one of them. He saw time in four outdoor games, mostly as late game substitutes to Arnie Mausser. The Rowdies released him just before the 1977 season. In April 1977, he signed as a free agent with the Washington Diplomats. In the fall of 1977, the Diplomats sent him on loan to the Memphis Rogues for the indoor season, but a hand injury kept him out of any games. The Diplomats then traded him to the Rogues where he played 27 games during the outdoor season. In the fall of 1980, he moved to the Phoenix Inferno of the Major Indoor Soccer League. In 1981, he finished his professional career with the San Jose Earthquakes.

He died in a car accident in July 1990. At the time he owned the club, Rumours in the Gap.
