= Kevin Welsh (American soccer) =

American soccer player

Personal information
- Full name: Kevin P. Welsh
- Date of birth: October 26, 1953 (age 73)
- Place of birth: Trenton, New Jersey, United States
- Position: Forward

Youth career
- 1971–1974: University of Bridgeport

Senior career*
Years	Team	Apps	(Gls)
1975–1976	Hartford Bicentennials	36	(1)
1976–1977	Ayr United	0	(0)
1977	New Jersey Americans	20	(4)
1978–1980	New England Tea Men	57	(2)
1979–1981	New England Tea Men (indoor)	38	(11)
1981–1982	Philadelphia Fever (indoor)	16	(0)

International career
1975	United States	1	(0)
- * Club domestic league appearances and goals

Kevin Welsh is a former a U.S. soccer forward who played five seasons in the North American Soccer League, one in the American Soccer League and at least one in the Major Indoor Soccer League. He also earned one cap with the U.S. national team.

== College ==
Welsh attended University of Bridgeport where he played on the men's soccer team from 1971 to 1974. During his four seasons he was a four-time Northeast All-Star Game selection and three time All-Northeast Team. He graduated cum laude in 1975.

== Professional ==
In 1975, the expansion Hartford Bicentennials of the North American Soccer League selected Welsh in the first round of the NASL draft. He spent the 1975 and 1976 seasons with Hartford. He then moved to Scotland where he played for Ayr United. He returned to the United States for the 1977 season and played for the New Jersey Americans of the American Soccer League. He returned to the NASL in 1978 as the first player to sign with the expansion New England Tea Men. Following the 1980-1981 indoor season, the Tea Men moved to Florida, but Welsh did not make the move. He finished his career with the Philadelphia Fever in the Major Indoor Soccer League.

== National team ==
Welsh earned his one cap with the United States men's national soccer team in a 4–0 loss to Poland on June 24, 1975. He came on for Doug Wark in the 84th minute.

Welsh later served as the executive assistant to the president and CEO of the New Jersey Sports and Exposition Authority. He then served as a vice president with Hampshire Management Co., in New Jersey. He is currently with the CB Richard Ellis.
