= Hank Kazmierski =

American soccer player

Personal information
- Full name: Henry Kazmierski
- Date of birth: October 30, 1949 (age 76)
- Place of birth: Baltimore, Maryland, U.S.
- Height: 6 ft 1 in (1.85 m)
- Position: Forward

College career
Years	Team	Apps	(Gls)
1968–1971	Baltimore Bees		

Senior career*
Years	Team	Apps	(Gls)
1973	Baltimore Bays		
1974–1975	Baltimore Comets	29	(6)
1975	Baltimore Comets (indoor)	2	(2)
- * Club domestic league appearances and goals

Hank Kazmierski is an American retired soccer forward who played professionally in the North American Soccer League and American Soccer League.

Kazmierski graduated from Mount Saint Joseph High School in Baltimore, Maryland. He attended the University of Baltimore, playing on the men's soccer team from 1968 to 1971. He graduated in 1972 and is a member of the UB Athletic Hall of Fame. In May 1973, Kazmierski signed with the Baltimore Bays of the American Soccer League. In 1974, he moved to the Baltimore Comets of the North American Soccer League, playing with them through the 1975 season.

In 1994, he was inducted into the Maryland Soccer Association Hall of Fame.
