= Julio Correa (footballer) =

Uruguayan footballer (born 1948)

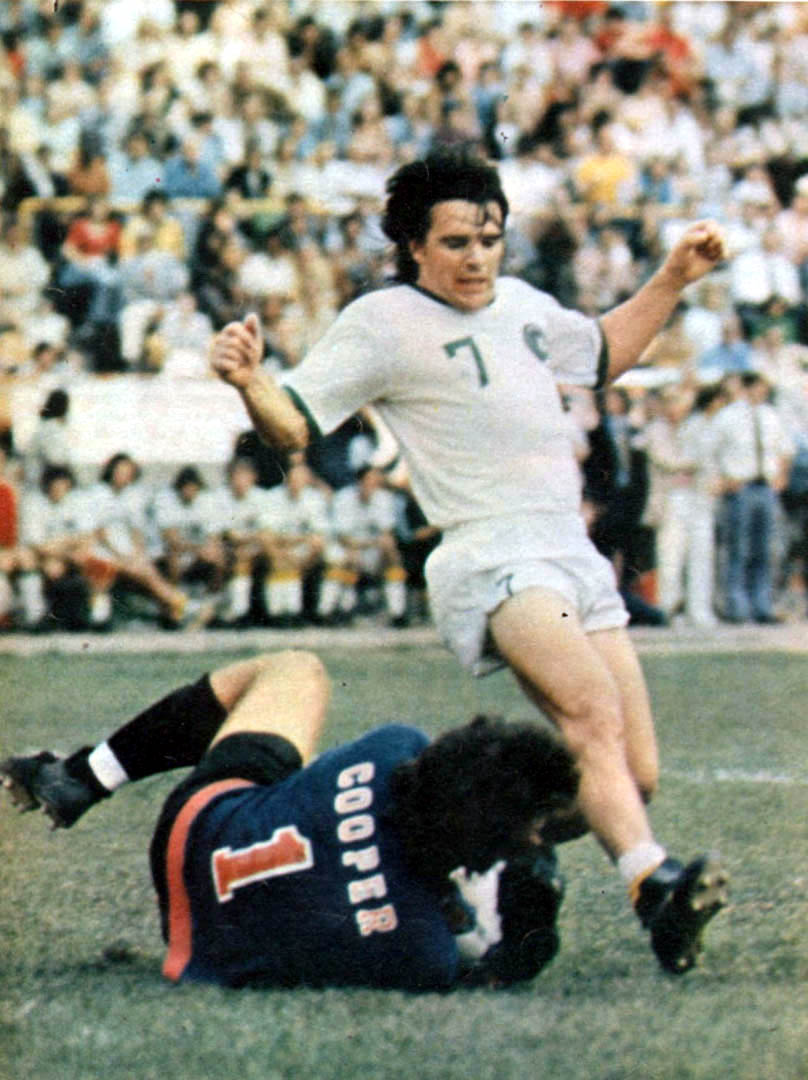
- Correa (no. 7) playing for the NY Cosmos in 1975

Personal information
- Date of birth: July 9, 1948 (age 78)
- Place of birth: Laguna Merin, Treinta y Tres, Uruguay
- Height: 1.63 m (5 ft 4 in)

Senior career*
Years	Team	Apps	(Gls)
1970–1971	Treinta y Tres		
- Rampla Juniors
- Liverpool Montevideo
- Defensor
1975	New York Cosmos		
1976	Huracán Buceo		
1977	Cobreloa		
- * Club domestic league appearances and goals

Julio Correa (born July 9, 1948) is a Uruguayan former footballer who played for clubs of Uruguay, Argentina, Chile and United States and the Uruguay national team.

== Teams ==
- (Uruguay) Treinta y Tres 1970–1971
- (Uruguay) Rampla Juniors
- (Uruguay) Liverpool
- (Uruguay) Defensor
- (United States) New York Cosmos 1975
- (Uruguay) Huracán Buceo 1976
- (Chile) Cobreloa 1977

== Personal life ==
He is nicknamed Colorín (Redhead).
