= Sakib Viteškić =

Bosnia and Herzegovina footballer

Personal information
- Full name: Sakib Viteškić
- Date of birth: December 27, 1952 (age 73)
- Place of birth: Sarajevo, FPR Yugoslavia
- Height: 1.82 m (6 ft 0 in)
- Position: Midfielder

Senior career*
Years	Team	Apps	(Gls)
1971–1977	Sarajevo		
1977–1978	MVV		
1978–1980	Washington Diplomats	61	(8)
1980–1981	Jedinstvo Brčko		
- * Club domestic league appearances and goals

Sakib Viteškić (born December 27, 1952) is a Bosnian former footballer.
