= Eddie Engerth =

American soccer player

Personal information
- Full name: John Edward Engerth
- Date of birth: November 8, 1951 (age 74)
- Place of birth: Graz, Austria
- Height: 5 ft 10 in (1.78 m)
- Position: Forward

Youth career
- 1968-1970: Tennent Panthers

College career
Years	Team	Apps	(Gls)
1971-1974	Hartwick Hawks		

Senior career*
Years	Team	Apps	(Gls)
1975	Tampa Bay Rowdies (indoor)	4	(3)
1976	Philadelphia Atoms	7	(0)
1977	Connecticut Yankees	22	(1)
- * Club domestic league appearances and goals

Eddie Engerth is an American retired soccer forward.

== Playing career ==
Engerth first gained attention at William Tennent High School in Warminster Township, Pennsylvania, and then while playing on a Pennsylvania high school all-star team that toured Europe in 1969. After high school he played for Hartwick College before spending two seasons in the North American Soccer League with the Tampa Bay Rowdies and Philadelphia Atoms respectively. Later he played one season in the American Soccer League with the Connecticut Yankees.
