= Jim May (soccer) =

American soccer player and coach (born 1953)

Personal information
- Full name: James L. May
- Date of birth: March 22, 1953 (age 73)
- Place of birth: Kings Ferry, New York, U.S.
- Position: Goalkeeper

College career
| Years | Team | Apps | (Gls) |
| 1970–1971 | SUNY Cobleskill Fighting Tigers | | |
| 1972–1973 | Brockport Golden Eagles | | |

Senior career*
| Years | Team | Apps | (Gls) |
| 1975–1978 | Rochester Lancers | 18 | (32) |
| 1978–1979 | Cleveland Force (indoor) | 12 | (0) |
| 1979–1985 | Buffalo Stallions (indoor) | 86 | (0) |

Managerial career
- 1994–1996: Buffalo Blizzard
- * Club domestic league appearances and goals

Jim May (born 1953) is an American retired soccer goalkeeper who played professionally in the North American Soccer League and the Major Indoor Soccer League.

May first attended SUNY Cobleskill where he was a 1972 junior college Honorable Mention (third team) All American soccer player. He earned an associate degree from Cobleskill in 1972 and was later inducted into the school's Athletic Hall of Fame. He then transferred to SUNY Brockport where he was a two-year starter on the men's soccer team. He was inducted into the school's Athletic Hall of Fame in 2004. In 1975, The Rochester Lancers selected May in the first round of the North American Soccer League draft. During his tenure there he collected Pele's jersey after a match against the New York Cosmos. In 1978, he moved to the Cleveland Force of the Major Indoor Soccer League. In 1979, the Buffalo Stallions selected May with the first pick of the MISL expansion draft.

After retirement he became vice president and general manager of the Buffalo Blizzard from 1992 to 1999. He also coached the team between 1994 and 1996. In 2007, May was inducted into the Greater Buffalo Sports Hall of Fame.
