= Rino Agostinis =

Canadian soccer player

Personal information
- Full name: Severinio Agostinis
- Date of birth: April 4, 1953 (age 73)
- Place of birth: Ovoledo, Italy
- Position: Defender

College career
Years	Team	Apps	(Gls)
- Simon Fraser Univ

Senior career*
Years	Team	Apps	(Gls)
1972	Toronto Italia		
- AC Monfalcone
1976	Vancouver Italia-Canadian Pauls		
1977	Tampa Bay Rowdies (indoor)	1	(0)
1977	Tampa Bay Rowdies	1	(0)
1978	Florida Stars	1	(1)
1979	Seattle Sounders	1	
1979	St. Pete Thunder Bolts		

International career
1976	Canada		
- * Club domestic league appearances and goals

Rino Agostinis (born April 4, 1953), sometimes referred to as Reno Agostinis, is a Canadian former soccer player who played as a defender.

== Career ==
Although born in Italy, his family moved to Canada when he was five years-old. Agostinis played in the National Soccer League in 1972 with Toronto Italia. He spent time back in Italy with Serie D side, AC Monfalcone, before returning to British Columbia to finish his degree at Simon Fraser University, where he also played. He was a preliminary selection for the 1976 Canadian Olympic team. Agostinis toured with national team, but was not featured on the final roster. In 1976, he played in the Vancouver Island Soccer League with Vancouver Italia-Canadian Pauls. The following season he played in the North American Soccer League with Tampa Bay Rowdies. He spent 1978 with the Florida Stars, a St. Petersburg, Florida-based club. In 1979, he signed with league rivals Seattle Sounders. Agostinis joined the St. Pete Thunder Bolts of the Southern Soccer League in November 1979.
