= Kevin Eagan =

American soccer player

Personal information
- Date of birth: December 30, 1954 (age 71)
- Place of birth: Florissant, Missouri, U.S.
- Height: 6 ft 3 in (1.91 m)
- Position: Defender

College career
Years	Team	Apps	(Gls)
1973–1977	South Florida Bulls		

Senior career*
Years	Team	Apps	(Gls)
1977–1978	Tampa Bay Rowdies	28	(0)
1979	New York Cosmos	3	(0)
1980–1981	Tulsa Roughnecks	40	(0)
1979–1981	Tulsa Roughnecks (indoor)	25	(1)
- * Club domestic league appearances and goals

Kevin Eagan is an American retired soccer defender who played in the North American Soccer League.

Eagan attended the University of South Florida, playing on the men's soccer team from 1973 to 1977. In January 1977, the Tampa Bay Rowdies selected Eagan as the 17th overall pick of the North American Soccer League draft. The Rowdies released him at the end of 1978 and he signed as a free agent with the New York Cosmos in 1979. He moved to the Tulsa Roughnecks in 1980 and played both indoor and outdoor seasons with them.
