= Bernard Hartze =

South African footballer

Personal information
- Date of birth: 5 March 1950
- Place of birth: Pretoria, South Africa
- Date of death: 16 January 2024 (aged 73)
- Height: 5 ft 9 in (1.75 m)
- Position: Midfielder

Youth career
- 1964–1965: Mamelodi Sundowns F.C.

Senior career*
Years	Team	Apps	(Gls)
- Berea F.C.
1967–1970	Orlando Pirates		
1970–1972	Cape Town Spurs		
1973	Cape Town United		
1975	Tampa Bay Rowdies (indoor)	3	(4)
1975	Tampa Bay Rowdies	6	(1)
1976	Tacoma Tides		
1976	Sacramento Spirits		
1977–	Hellenic F.C.		

Managerial career
- 1976: Sacramento Spirits
- 1999: Mother City F.C.
- 2010: WP United
- * Club domestic league appearances and goals

Bernard "Dancing Shoes" Hartze (born 5 March 1950 – died 16 January 2024) was a South African retired professional footballer who played as a midfielder. He played in several leagues in South Africa and the United States. Early on, Hartze was given the nickname "Dancing Shoes" because of his deft dribbling skills and footwork.

== Youth ==
Hartze was born in Marabastad section of Pretoria, South Africa in 1950 to a Dutch father and a South African mother. This ethnic diversity would designate him as coloured by the South African government. At age 14 he was amongst a group of schoolboys who in the early 1960s formed the Pretoria Sundowns, and he signed his first professional contract at age 15.

== Career ==
Because of his multiracial ethnicity and the government's apartheid policies, Hartze's playing options were limited. The National Football League was white-only. Officials in Durban once tried to change his registry designation to white so that he could play in the NFL but were unsuccessful. His spirited play earned him a trial with Leeds United F.C. in 1967 but the complex FA rules for signing internationals at the time, as well as the homesickness any 17-year-old boy in a foreign country might experience conspired against him and after two months he returned to South Africa.

After a time at Berea F.C., he joined Orlando Pirates in late 1967 and enjoyed great success on the non-racial club. However, the National Professional Soccer League (NPSL) was set up as a league for Bantus only. When government officials enforced this rule, Hartze and three teammates were forced to leave the club in 1970.

This left the Federation Professional League, a league comprising coloureds and Indian South Africans, as his only professional option. In 1970, he served as a player-coach for Cape Town Spurs F.C. and depending on which source material is referenced, Hartze won scoring titles while at Spurs in 1970, 1971 and possibly 1972. It is reported that in 1970 he scored 54 goals in 30 games and earned South Africa's Sportsman of the Year award. Another source has him scoring at an even more torrid pace in 1972: 35 goals in 16 matches. There is also a report of him scoring both goals in a cup final for Cape Town United as they overcame his former club Spurs, 2–0.

In December 1974 he was the third player to sign with the newly-formed Tampa Bay Rowdies of the North American Soccer League, tallying 4 goals with 3 assists in helping the Rowdies to a runner-up finish in the 1975 indoor tournament. He was injured in the second game of the 1975 outdoor season and struggled to regain his fitness, making only four more appearances for the rest of the season. As the Rowdies marched to victory in Soccer Bowl '75, Hartze was on the injured list and did not dress for the final.

He played on loan for Cape Town in 1975-76 during the NASL's off-season before returning to the U.S. in 1976. That spring Hartze joined the Tacoma Tides of the American Soccer League on loan from the Rowdies. He was then traded to the Sacramento Spirits in June 1976. In late July after the firing of head coach Dick Ott, he was named player-coach with eight games remaining in the season, guiding the Spirits to a 3–1–4 record. As South African teams began integrating, he returned home in 1977 and signed with NPSL side Hellenic F.C. The following year the NPSL was reorganized to officially become non-racial.

== Coaching ==
In addition to his stint in charge of Sacramento, he briefly managed Mother City F.C. of the South African Premiership, in 1999 before getting sacked. In 2010 he agreed to coach WP United of the Vodacom League.

== Later recognition ==
In 2006 the Government of the Western Cape's Department of Cultural Affairs and Sport named Hartze a 2006 Sports Legend

In October 2007, Bernard was amongst a group of 50 past and present players coaches and official honored by the Confederation of African Football on the occasion of the CAF's 50th Anniversary.

In August 2016 Cape Town City FC gave lifetime season tickets to 30 local footballing legends, including Hartze.

In February 2017 the Joburg Post ranked him second on their list of the Greatest Orlando Pirates players ever, behind only Percy "Chippa" Moloi.
