= Frantz St. Lot =

Haitian footballer (born 1950)

Personal information
- Full name: Frantz St. Lot
- Date of birth: December 13, 1950 (age 75)
- Place of birth: Port-au-Prince, Haiti
- Height: 5 ft 7 in (1.70 m)
- Position: Defender

College career
Years	Team	Apps	(Gls)
1973	East Stroudsburg Warriors		

Senior career*
Years	Team	Apps	(Gls)
1975–1976	Rhode Island Oceaneers		(0)
1977–1978	Tampa Bay Rowdies	27	(0)
1978	Tampa Bay Rowdies (indoor)	7	(2)
1979	Memphis Rogues	12	(0)
1979–1980	Memphis Rogues (indoor)	12	(3)
1980	Los Angeles Aztecs	24	(1)
1980–1983	New York Arrows (indoor)	101	(17)
1983–1984	Phoenix Pride (indoor)	39	(13)
1986–1987	New York Express (indoor)	18	(3)
- * Club domestic league appearances and goals

Frantz St. Lot (born December 13, 1950) or Frantz St-Lot is a Haitian-born, American former soccer player that played professionally in the United States as a defender.

== Amateur ==
St. Lot first played for the Haitian youth team and then in college for East Stroudsburg State in Pennsylvania, where he netted 10 goals in 1973.

== Professional ==
St. Lot joined the Rhode Island Oceaneers of the ASL for the 1975 and 1976 seasons. In 1977, he signed as a free agent with the Tampa Bay Rowdies of the North American Soccer League appearing in only a handful of games. During the offseason he played in seven indoor games for Tampa Bay. Under new coach Gordon Jago his role was greatly expanded during the 1978 season as he appeared in 22 of 30 regular season matches and all but one of the Rowdies playoff games. He was a starter in Soccer Bowl '78 but gave way to Mirandinha in the 57th minute due to an injury.

During the offseason he was traded to the Memphis Rogues, per his request, because of an ongoing salary dispute. He was believed to be the lowest paid regular player on the squad during that 1978 season. He played in 12 games for the Rogues in 1979 and during the league’s first fully sanctioned indoor season (1979–80) he helped Memphis reach the finals. In 1980, he moved west to join the Los Angeles Aztecs.

After that season his career shifted to indoors. He spent three seasons with the New York Arrows of the Major Indoor Soccer League. While with New York he won two MISL titles and scored the series clinching goal during the 1981-82 finals. In 1983-84 he played for the Phoenix Pride and had his best season statistically notching 13 goals and 12 assists. He closed out his playing career with the New York Express.

== Post-playing career ==
Since 2001 St. Lot has been an assistant coach for the New York Institute of Technology men's team. He also serves as the director of coaching for the Brentwood Youth Soccer Club (NY) and is a member of the Samba 360 advisory board, which aids disadvantaged children through the collection and distribution of donated sports equipment.

== Honors ==
=== MISL Championships ===
- 1980–81
- 1981–82

=== NASL Championships ===
- 1978 -runner up
- 1979–80 Indoor -runner up
