= Mike Hewitt (footballer) =

Scottish footballer

Personal information
- Date of birth: 14 July 1949 (age 77)
- Place of birth: Glasgow, Scotland
- Position: Goalkeeper

Senior career*
Years	Team	Apps	(Gls)
1967–1970	Queen's Park	55	(0)
1970–1975	Dundee	42	(0)
1975	Tampa Bay Rowdies	10	(0)
1976–1982	San Jose Earthquakes	150	(0)
1979–1980	Hartford Hellions (indoor)	12	(0)
1982–1983	Golden Bay Earthquakes (indoor)	17	(0)
1983	Montreal Manic	15	(0)
- * Club domestic league appearances and goals

Mike Hewitt (born 14 July 1944) is a Scottish retired football goalkeeper who played professionally in Scotland, Canada and the United States.

After three seasons with the Scottish League's only amateur club, Queen's Park, Hewitt began his professional career with Dundee F.C. in 1970. He won his only representative honour when he was included as an overaged player in the Scotland U23 squad for the unofficial match against West Germany's Olympic XI on 10 January 1972. (He played the full 90 minutes, keeping a clean sheet in Scotland's 1–0 victory.) In 1975, Hewitt became one of the first two players, along with Alex Pringle, signed by the Tampa Bay Rowdies of the North American Soccer League as they purchased his contract from Dundee. He spent the season sharing goalkeeper duties with Paul Hammond as the Rowdies won the league championship. In 1976, the Rowdies traded Hewitt to the San Jose Earthquakes where he manned the nets for the next seven years. While playing outdoor soccer with the Earthquakes, Hewitt also spent the 1979-1980 winter season with the Hartford Hellions of the Major Indoor Soccer League. He also played the 1982-1983 MISL season with the Golden Bay Earthquakes. In mid-April 1983, the Earthquakes sold Hewitt's contract to the Montreal Manic.
