= John Boyle (footballer, born 1946) =

Scottish footballer

Personal information
- Full name: John Boyle
- Date of birth: 25 December 1946 (age 79)
- Place of birth: Motherwell, Scotland
- Position: Midfielder

Youth career
- 1961–1964: Chelsea

Senior career*
Years	Team	Apps	(Gls)
1964–1973	Chelsea	198	(10)
1973	→ Brighton & Hove Albion (loan)	10	(0)
1973–1975	Orient	18	(0)
1975	Tampa Bay Rowdies (indoor)	4	(0)
1975	Tampa Bay Rowdies	21	(3)
Total		261	(13)

Managerial career
- 1977: Tampa Bay Rowdies
- * Club domestic league appearances and goals

John Boyle (born 25 December 1946) is a Scottish former footballer who played during the 1960s and 1970s.

Born in Motherwell, he signed for London club Chelsea as a 15-year-old whilst on holiday in the city. Boyle was one of the lesser-known, but nevertheless important, members of the successful Chelsea side of the period, usually playing in the midfield ball-winner role. He made his Chelsea debut in a League Cup semi-final against Aston Villa and ultimately picked up a winners' medal in that competition the same year after playing in Chelsea's two-legged final victory over Leicester City.

He played in Chelsea's FA Cup final loss to Tottenham Hotspur two years later but missed out due to injury when they won their FA Cup final against Leeds United in 1970. He made amends the following season, playing in both matches of Chelsea's successful Cup Winners' Cup final against Real Madrid in Athens.

Boyle spent two months on loan at Brighton & Hove Albion before leaving Chelsea in December 1973 to sign for Orient. He then joined the North American Soccer League expansion side Tampa Bay Rowdies in February 1975 just ahead of their indoor campaign. He captained Tampa Bay to a runner-up finish in the 1975 NASL Indoor tournament in March, and in August to victory in Soccer Bowl '75. Boyle retired in late 1975 and later had a brief spell coaching the Rowdies in 1977 after Eddie Firmani abruptly resigned from the post.

== Honours ==
Chelsea

- Football League Cup: 1964–65
- FA Cup runner-up: 1966–67
