= Stewart Scullion =

Scottish footballer

Personal information
- Full name: Stewart McNab Adam Scullion
- Date of birth: 18 April 1946 (age 80)
- Place of birth: Bo'ness, Scotland
- Position: Winger

Senior career*
Years	Team	Apps	(Gls)
- Chesham United
1964–1966	Charlton Athletic	0	(0)
1966–1971	Watford	225	(30)
1971–1973	Sheffield United	57	(7)
1973–1976	Watford	87	(19)
1975	→ Tampa Bay Rowdies (loan)	18	(7)
1976	Tampa Bay Rowdies	24	(10)
1976–77	Wimbledon		
1977	Portland Timbers	24	(11)
1977–78	Hayes		
1978–79	Portland Timbers	39	(2)
1979–1980	Philadelphia Fever (indoor)	8	(5)
- * Club domestic league appearances and goals

Stewart McNab Adam Scullion (born 18 April 1946) is a Scottish former footballer, who played as a winger. Born in Bo'ness, Scotland, he started his professional career in the Football League, helping Watford to the Third Division title, and then spending three seasons at Sheffield United. After a second spell at Watford, he joined Tampa Bay Rowdies in the North American Soccer League. He was their second highest goalscorer in his first season, and in both years was named in the league's second All-star team. Scullion briefly returned to England with Wimbledon, before finishing his professional career in America with the Portland Timbers.

== Early life ==
Scullion moved to England from his hometown of Bo'ness, West Lothian aged 13. He attended Bourne Secondary School in Ruislip, and worked as a clerk for British European Airways.

== Playing career ==
=== Football League ===
Scullion started his football career at amateur club Chesham United, who at that time played in the Athenian League. He joined Football League side Charlton Athletic as an amateur in November 1964, turning professional three months later. However, Scullion did not play a league game for Charlton, and in February 1966 he was signed by Watford manager Ken Furphy in a deal that saw Cliff Holton move in the opposite direction. On 25 January 1969, Scullion scored the opening goal in a 1–1 draw against Manchester United in the Fourth Round of the FA Cup at Old Trafford. He also played in the replay on 3 February. Watford lost 2–0, but set their highest ever attendance of 34,099. At the end of the 1968–69 season, Watford were promoted as champions. Scullion remained at the club for two further seasons, before being sold to Sheffield United for £25,000 in May 1971. The season after Scullion's departure, Watford were relegated, winning only 5 of their 42 league games in the 1971–72 season. During his two and a half years in Sheffield, Scullion played 57 league games, scoring 7 goals, before being sold back to Watford for £15,000 in December 1973. Watford finished 7th in Scullion's first full season back at the club, but were relegated to the Football League Fourth Division in his second.

=== North American Soccer League ===
Still contracted to Watford, Scullion was loaned to North American Soccer League franchise Tampa Bay Rowdies in May 1975. He scored 7 goals in 18 NASL games that season, helping the side win the Eastern Division. In the playoff final, Tampa defeated Portland Timbers 2–0 to become NASL champions. He was also named in the 1975 NASL All-star second team. Following this success, Scullion transferred to Tampa from Watford permanently for £8,000 in February 1976. He helped the 1976 indoor Rowdies win the NASL's Spring indoor tournament. In his second season, he scored 10 times in 24 appearances, with Tampa winning the Eastern Division Atlantic Conference, and Scullion again being named in the All-star second team. He returned to England for the 1976–77 season with Wimbledon, before returning to the US to play for Portland Timbers. After his first of three seasons (1977-1979) at the Timbers, Scullion played for English non-league side Hayes, and returned there briefly in 1981–82. He also played eight games, scoring five goals, for the Philadelphia Fever during the 1979–1980 Major Indoor Soccer League season.

=== Team America ===
The Bicentennial Cup was held to commemorate the 200th anniversary of the United States Declaration of Independence. It featured the national teams of Brazil, England and Italy, as well as Team America, comprising NASL players of many nationalities, and coached by Ken Furphy. Playing alongside Pelé, Bobby Moore and Giorgio Chinaglia, Scullion scored Team America's only goal of the tournament, in a 3–1 defeat to England.

== Honours ==
=== Team ===
- Watford
  - Football League Third Division Champions: 1968–69
- Tampa Bay Rowdies
  - North American Soccer League Champions: 1975
  - North American Soccer League Eastern conference: 1975, 1976
  - North American Soccer League Indoor Champions: 1976
  - North American Soccer League Indoor Eastern Regional: 1976

=== Individual ===
- North American Soccer League All-star second team: 1975, 1976
- North American Soccer League Indoor All-Region team: 1976
- North American Soccer League Indoor All-Tournament team: 1976
