= Dennis Wit =

American soccer player

Personal information
- Date of birth: July 25, 1951 (age 75)
- Place of birth: Baltimore, Maryland, United States
- Height: 6 ft 2 in (1.88 m)
- Position: Midfielder

College career
Years	Team	Apps	(Gls)
1969–1972	Loyola College		

Senior career*
Years	Team	Apps	(Gls)
1973	Baltimore Bays	21	(2)
1974–1975	Baltimore Comets	28	(2)
1976	San Diego Jaws	14	(0)
1976–1977	Tampa Bay Rowdies	14	(0)
1978–1980	New England Tea Men	57	(2)
1979–1981	New England Tea Men (indoor)	29	(16)
1981–1982	Jacksonville Tea Men	48	(0)

International career
1976–1979	United States	4	(0)
- * Club domestic league appearances and goals

Dennis Wit is a retired American soccer midfielder who spent one season in the American Soccer League and nine in the North American Soccer League. He also earned four caps with the U.S. national team.

== College ==
Wit attended Loyola College where he played on the men's soccer team from 1969 to 1972. He finished his career with 53 goals, placing him in second on the college's all time goals list.

== Professional ==
In 1973, Wit began his professional career with the Baltimore Bays of the American Soccer League. In 1974, he moved up to the Baltimore Comets of the North American Soccer League (NASL). He spent the 1974 and 1975 seasons with the Comets, then moved with the team when it left Baltimore to become the San Diego Jaws. Wit began the 1976 season in San Diego, but was traded to the Tampa Bay Rowdies after fourteen games. He finished the 1976 season in Tampa Bay, then played all of 1977 there before moving back north to the New England Tea Men for the 1978 season. The Tea Men moved to Jacksonville before the 1981 season. Wit moved with the team and played the 1981 and 1982 seasons in Jacksonville.

== National team ==
Wit was on the American team at the 1975 Pan American Games and earned four caps with the U.S. national team. His first game came in a scoreless tie with Mexico on October 3, 1976. This game was the second U.S. qualification game for the 1978 FIFA World Cup. Wit's second game with the national team did not go so well as the U.S. fell 3–0 to Mexico twelve days later. He played one more game in 1976, a scoreless tie with Haiti on November 10. His last game with the national team came in a 3–1 loss to the Soviet Union on February 3, 1979. In that game, Wit was a second-half substitute for Gary Etherington.

Wit is now a toy sales manager in Jacksonville, Florida.
