= Malcolm Linton =

English footballer

Personal information
- Full name: Malcolm Wilton Linton
- Date of birth: 13 February 1952 (age 74)
- Place of birth: Southend-on-Sea, England
- Height: 6 ft 1 in (1.85 m)
- Position: Central defender

Senior career*
Years	Team	Apps	(Gls)
1971–1972	Southend United	0	(0)
1972–1975	Orient	19	(0)
1975	Bath City	6	(0)
1975	Tampa Bay Rowdies	20	(0)
1976	Los Angeles Aztecs	23	(0)
1976–1977	Gravesend & Northfleet		
- Tilbury
- * Club domestic league appearances and goals

Malcolm Wilton Linton (born 13 February 1952) is an English former professional footballer who played in the Football League and the North American Soccer League as a central defender.
