= Eddie Austin =

Scottish-American soccer player

Personal information
- Full name: Edward Austin
- Date of birth: 14 March 1952 (age 74)
- Place of birth: Glasgow, Scotland
- Position: Forward

College career
Years	Team	Apps	(Gls)
1970–1973	Hartwick Hawks		

Senior career*
Years	Team	Apps	(Gls)
1975–1976	Tampa Bay Rowdies	17	(0)
1977–1978	New Jersey Americans		
- * Club domestic league appearances and goals

Edward Austin is a retired Scottish-American football (soccer) forward who played professionally in the North American Soccer League and American Soccer League. He later had an extensive career in team management culminating in working as the Chief Operations Officer for the Tampa Bay Mutiny of Major League Soccer. He was the 1998 and 2001 MLS Operations Executive of the Year.

== Player ==
Born in Glasgow, Scotland, Austin moved to the United States with his family when he was a child. He is a 1970 graduate of the former Essex Catholic High School in Newark, N.J., where he played on two New Jersey Parochial A State Championship teams, 1969 and 1970. Austin played at the Varsity level all four years; those teams compiled a record, over four years, of 38 wins, 8 losses and 8 ties. Austin attended Hartwick College where he was a 1971 Honorable Mention (third team) All American soccer player. Harwick College inducted Austin into the Athletic Hall of Fame in 2001. In 1974 the New York Cosmos drafted Austin, but a pre-season injury resulted in the Cosmos declining to sign him. In 1975, Austin joined the Tampa Bay Rowdies. That year, the Rowdies won the North American Soccer League championship. The following year they also won the 1976 indoor title. In 1977 Austin moved to the New Jersey Americans of the American Soccer League. He again won a league title as the Americans topped the Sacramento Spirits in the ASL championship game. In 1978, he suffered a career ending knee injury.

== Team management ==
Following his retirement as a player, Austin began a career in team management. He began as the New Jersey Americans Director of Public Relations. In 1979, he became the Tampa Bay Rowdies Director of Player and Community Development before becoming the team's Director of Operations. He left the Rowdies in 1987, having been inducted into the team's Hall of Fame in 1986. After working in the automotive industry, Austin returned to team management in 1996 when he became the Chief Operating Officer of the Tampa Bay Mutiny of Major League Soccer.

== Recognitions ==
- 1998 - MLS Operations Executive of the Year
- 2001 - MLS Operations Executive of the Year
- 1982 - Hall of Fame at the Essex Catholic High School Foundation
