= Doug Wark =

Scottish-American soccer player

Personal information
- Date of birth: 24 December 1951 (age 74)
- Place of birth: Glasgow, Scotland
- Position: Forward

College career
Years	Team	Apps	(Gls)
1970–1971	Mitchell Mariners		
1972–1973	Hartwick Hawks		

Senior career*
Years	Team	Apps	(Gls)
1974	Rochester Lancers	6	(1)
1975–1976	Tampa Bay Rowdies	17	(0)
1976	San Diego Jaws	4	(1)
1977	Las Vegas Quicksilvers	17	(2)
1978	San Diego Sockers	2	(0)
1978	San Jose Earthquakes	8	(0)
1978	Chicago Sting	2	(0)
1978–1979	Cincinnati Kids (indoor)	22	(29)
1979–1980	Tampa Bay Rowdies (indoor)	8	(6)
1980	Baltimore Blast (indoor)	2	(2)
1980–1981	San Francisco Fog (indoor)	15	(4)
Total		103	(45)

International career
1975	United States	1	(0)
- * Club domestic league appearances and goals

Doug Wark (born 24 December 1951) is a former Scottish-American soccer forward who spent five seasons in the North American Soccer League and three in the Major Indoor Soccer League. He earned one cap with the U.S. national team in 1975.

Wark grew up in Teaneck, New Jersey where he attended Teaneck High School, graduating in 1970.

== College ==
Wark attended Mitchell College and then transferred to Hartwick College where he played two seasons of soccer in 1972 and 1973. He earned second-team All-American recognition in 1973 as Hartwick went to the NCAA quarterfinals. Inducted into the Hartwick Athletic Hall of Fame on 30 September 1995.

== Professional ==
Wark left Hartwick after his sophomore season to sign with the Rochester Lancers of the North American Soccer League (NASL). He spent only one season in Rochester before being traded to the Tampa Bay Rowdies before the 1975 indoor season. The Rowdies then traded him to the San Diego Jaws four games into the 1976 season. In 1977, the Jaws moved to Las Vegas where they were renamed the Las Vegas Quicksilvers. After the 1977 season, the team was back in San Diego, now known as the San Diego Sockers. He again began the season with one team only to be traded by the Sockers to the San Jose Earthquakes during the 1978 season. After only eight games in San Jose, he was again traded, this time to the Chicago Sting. He finished the 1978 NASL season in Chicago, then left the league. During the NASL's 1975 indoor tournament Wark scored three goals in the Regionals, and seven goals in the Championship rounds, making him the tournament's second leading scorer behind Paul Child. Wark was selected to the 1975 indoor all-tournament team.

When Wark left the NASL following the 1978 season, he signed with the Cincinnati Kids of Major Indoor Soccer League for the inaugural MISL season. He scored twenty-nine goals in twenty-two games. He returned to the Rowdies to play in the 1979–80 indoor season. He began the 1980–81 season with the Baltimore Blast but moved to the San Francisco Fog after two games.

== National team ==
Wark earned one cap with the U.S. national team in a 24 June 1975 loss to Poland. He started the game, then came off in the 84th minute for Kevin Welsh.

== See also ==
- List of United States men's international soccer players born outside the United States
