= Randy Garber (soccer) =

American soccer player and coach

Personal information
- Date of birth: August 19, 1952 (age 74)
- Place of birth: Abington, Pennsylvania, United States
- Position: Midfielder

Youth career
- Abington

College career
Years	Team	Apps	(Gls)
1971–1972	Mercer County Community College		
1973–1974	Penn State Nittany Lions		

Senior career*
Years	Team	Apps	(Gls)
1975–1976	Tampa Bay Rowdies (indoor)	6	(3)
1975–1976	Tampa Bay Rowdies	18	(1)
1976	Los Angeles Aztecs	0	(0)
1977–1978	Washington Diplomats	7	(0)
1978	Washington Diplomats (indoor)	9	(14)
1978–1979	Cleveland Force (indoor)	20	(0)
1979	Detroit Lightning (indoor)	1	(0)
1980	Philadelphia Fever (indoor)	5	(0)

International career
1975	United States	1	(0)

Managerial career
- Penn State (assistant)
- * Club domestic league appearances and goals

Randy Garber is a former U.S. soccer midfielder who played four seasons in the North American Soccer League and two seasons in the Major Indoor Soccer League. He earned one cap with the U.S. national team and currently coaches youth soccer in Abington, Pennsylvania.

== Player ==
=== High school and college ===
Garber attended Abington Senior High School, graduating in 1971. He was inducted into the Abington Hall of Fame in 1998. After graduating High School, he attended Mercer County Community College where he was an All-American both years. He then attended Penn State University where he played on the men's soccer team in 1973 and 1974. He was recruited by coach Herb Schmidt to play soccer at PSU. He was named a 1974 honorable mention (third team) All-American.

=== Professional ===
In 1975, Garber was selected in the second round of the North American Soccer League by the Tampa Bay Rowdies and later signed with them. During one of his games, he played head to head against Pelé and actually traded jerseys with him. He was traded in the middle of the 1976 season to the Los Angeles Aztecs. At the end of the season, the Aztecs sold Garber's contract to the Washington Diplomats. During the 1978-1979 off season, the Dips played a series of exhibition indoor games in which Garber was the team's second leading scorer. The Dips released him in January 1979. When released by the Dips, Garber joined the Cleveland Force of Major Indoor Soccer League (MISL). Halfway through the season he injured his knee and was in rehab the rest of the season. He was later traded to the Detroit Lightning. The following season he played for the Philadelphia Fever, then retired.

=== National team ===
Garber earned his single cap with the U.S. national team in a 4–0 loss to Poland on June 24, 1975. He came off for Tim Logush in the 40th minute.

== Coach ==
Garber has coached extensively at the youth level, but he gained his start at his alma mater when he was an assistant to Penn State head coach Walter Bahr. Since retiring from playing, he has spent most of his career coaching youth in Roslyn, Pennsylvania, where he was the 1996 NSCAA youth soccer coach of the year. and the 1997 Eastern Pennsylvania Youth Soccer Association Coach of the Year. He also coaches the Abington Senior High School boys soccer team. The team won a PIAA State Championship in 2025.
