= Arsène Auguste =

Haitian footballer (1951–1993)

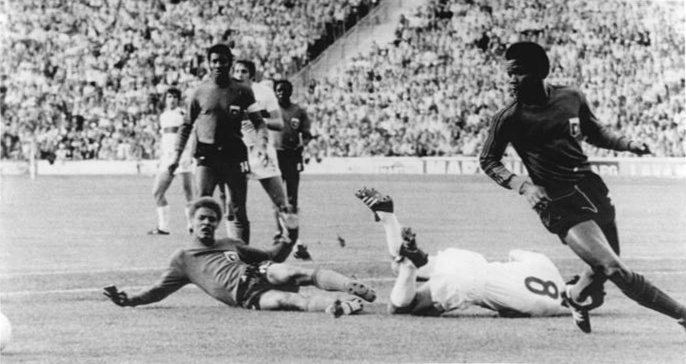
- Auguste (right) playing at the 1974 FIFA World Cup against Italy.

Personal information
- Date of birth: 3 February 1951
- Place of birth: Port-au-Prince, Haiti
- Date of death: 20 March 1993 (aged 42)
- Place of death: Miami, Florida, United States
- Height: 1.91 m (6 ft 3 in)
- Position: Defender

Senior career*
Years	Team	Apps	(Gls)
1974	Racing Club Haïtien		
1975	New Jersey Brewers		
1975–1979	Tampa Bay Rowdies	75	(3)
1979–1980	→ Tampa Bay Rowdies (indoor)	12	(2)
1980–1981	Fort Lauderdale Strikers	40	(0)
1980–1981	→ Fort Lauderdale Strikers (indoor)	12	(5)
1981–1982	Pittsburgh Spirit (indoor)	6	(1)
1986–1987	Tampa Bay Rowdies (indoor)	11	(0)
Total		156	(11)

International career
- Haiti
- * Club domestic league appearances and goals

Arsène Auguste (3 February 1951 – 20 March 1993) was a Haitian international footballer who represented Haiti in the 1974 FIFA World Cup.

He played professional club football with Racing Club Haïtien in Haiti and New Jersey Brewers, Tampa Bay Rowdies and Fort Lauderdale Strikers in the United States. Auguste scored the game-winning goal in the 66th minute of a 2–0 victory for Tampa Bay in the Soccer Bowl '75.

In 1978 and 1980 he was part of the losing side in the Soccer Bowl finals, once each with Tampa Bay and Fort Lauderdale. On both occasions his side fell to the New York Cosmos, by scores of 1–3 and 0–3, respectively. In 1986, he again signed with the Rowdies, then playing in the American Indoor Soccer Association.

Auguste played in 15 World Cup qualifying matches for Haiti from 1973 to 1981, the last of these being a 1–1 draw with Mexico in the 1981 CONCACAF Championship in Tegucigalpa.

He died of a heart attack on 20 March 1993 while mowing his yard in Miami, Florida.
