= Derek Smethurst =

South African soccer player

Personal information
- Date of birth: 24 October 1947 (age 79)
- Place of birth: Durban, South Africa
- Position: Forward

Youth career
- Glenwood
- Berea Park
- Addington,

Senior career*
Years	Team	Apps	(Gls)
1966	Addington	4	(6)
1967–1968	Durban City F.C.	47	(24)
1968–1971	Chelsea	18	(5)
1971–1975	Millwall	71	(9)
1975–1978	Tampa Bay Rowdies	65	(57)
1976–1978	Tampa Bay Rowdies (indoor)	12	(23)
1978	San Diego Sockers	17	(2)
1979–1980	Seattle Sounders	30	(14)
1980–1981	Seattle Sounders (indoor)	11	(5)
1981–1982	Memphis Americans (indoor)	33	(35)
1982	Carolina Lightnin'	6	(0)
1986–1987	Tampa Bay Rowdies (indoor)		
Total		314	(170)
- * Club domestic league appearances and goals

Derek Smethurst (born 24 October 1947, in Durban) is a retired South African soccer forward who played professionally in South Africa, England and the United States.

== Biography ==
Born into a sporting family, both his father Norman and brother Peter played professionally. Smethurst spent time with three amateur teams, Glenwood, Berea Park and Addington, in his early career. He began his professional career with Durban City F.C. In December 1968, he transferred to Chelsea F.C. He spent the remainder of the 1968–1969 and the entire 1969–1970 season with the Chelsea Reserves. Despite missing a large part of the 1969–1970 season with an injury, Smethurst still compiled 20 goals in 42 games with the reserves. He made his first team debut on 1 September 1970. Smethurst was the first South African to win a European championship when Chelsea won the 1970–71 European Cup Winners' Cup. He was the first foreign-born player to win a European championship in England. Two games into the 1971–1972 season, Chelsea transferred Smethurst to Millwall F.C. for £35,000 at his request. He spent four seasons with Millwall. In 1975, Smethurst moved to the United States where he played for the newly established Tampa Bay Rowdies of the North American Soccer League, where he became their all-time leading goal scorer with 57 goals in 65 games and a NASL all star. He was the captain of the Rowdies' 1976 indoor championship team. In 1978, he began the season with Tampa Bay, but in May 1978 at his own request, he was traded to the San Diego Sockers in exchange for Peter Andersen. He led the Tampa Bay Rowdies in goals scored for the three years he played with them. The Sockers traded him in July 1978. In 1979, he signed with the Seattle Sounders. He spent two outdoor seasons and one NASL indoor season with the Sounders before moving to the Memphis Americans for the 1981–1982 Major Indoor Soccer League season. He scored a hat-trick for the Sounders in a home game against the Portland Timbers on 30 June 1979. Smethurst scored 75 goals in just over 100 games in the NASL. In the spring of 1982, he joined the Carolina Lightnin' of the American Soccer League, and after six games retired from outdoor football. He rejoined the Rowdies for the 1986–87 AISA season, appearing in a few home matches only. Smethurst's goal-scoring rate in professional first-team football was a goal for every 1.85 games. Played in the "First" English League game to be played on a Sunday for Millwall v Fulham, 20 January 1974.

He also played in the 1977 NFL pre-season with the Tampa Bay Buccaneers as a placekicker wearing jersey #12.

Now an accomplished author and sports consultant, Smethurst lives in Valrico, Florida, and runs a professional soccer training academy.

== Achievements ==
- First African national to win a European Championship
- First South African to win a European Championship
- First foreign-born player to win a European Championship in England
- First foreign player to score for Chelsea in a European Championship
- First foreign player to win a European Championship with Chelsea F.C.
- First foreign player to play in a European Championship Final for Chelsea
- First player to score 4 goals in one game for the Tampa Bay Rowdies – NASL
- First Seattle Sounder to score 3 goals in one game – NASL
- First Seattle Sounder to score 4 goals in one game – NASL
- First and only South African to score 3 goals in a Currie Cup Final in South Africa.
