= Alex Pringle =

Scottish footballer

Personal information
- Date of birth: 8 November 1948 (age 77)
- Place of birth: Edinburgh, Scotland
- Position: Defender

Senior career*
Years	Team	Apps	(Gls)
- Glasgow United
1968–1972	Hibernian	9	(0)
1972–1974	Dundee	24	(1)
1974–1975	Clyde	7	(0)
1975–1977	Tampa Bay Rowdies	37	(1)
1977–1978	Washington Diplomats	28	(0)
1979	New Jersey Americans		
Total		105	(2)

Managerial career
- 1975–1976: University of Tampa
- * Club domestic league appearances and goals

Alex Pringle (born 8 November 1948) is a Scottish former professional footballer who played as a defender. Active in Scotland and the United States, Pringle made over 100 appearances in a 10-year career.

== Career ==
Born in Edinburgh, Pringle played professionally in Scotland and the United States for Glasgow United, Hibernian, Dundee, Clyde, the Tampa Bay Rowdies, the Washington Diplomats and the New Jersey Americans. While in Tampa he also served as the head coach of the University of Tampa men's soccer team in 1975 and 1976. In two seasons, he compiled a record of 11 wins 15 losses and 1 draw.
