= Washington Diplomats =

Defunct American soccer club

- Full name: Washington Diplomats
- Nicknames: Diplomats; Dips
- Founded: 1974
- Dissolved: 1981; 45 years ago
- Stadium: Robert F. Kennedy Stadium; Pat Cunningham Stadium; D.C. Armory (indoor)
- Capacity: 55,000; 5,000; 6,500 (indoor)
- Chairman: Steve Danzansky
- Coach: Gordon Bradley
- League: NASL
Home colors	Away colors

Washington Diplomats (1981)
- Full name: Washington Diplomats
- Nicknames: Diplomats; Dips
- Founded: 1981
- Stadium: Robert F. Kennedy Stadium
- Capacity: 55,000
- Chairman: Jimmy Hill
- League: NASL NSL
Home colors	Away colors

The Washington Diplomats were an American soccer club representing Washington, D.C. Throughout their playing existence, the club played their home games at Robert F. Kennedy Memorial Stadium and indoor home matches at the neighboring D.C. Armory. Founded as an expansion franchise in 1974, the Diplomats competed in the now-defunct North American Soccer League, then the top-tier soccer league of the American soccer pyramid.

Plagued with mediocrity in their first few seasons of existence, the Diplomats did not qualify for the playoffs until 1976, their third year in the league. The Diplomats were knocked out by the New York Cosmos in the first round. That season, the club played their home matches in Northern Virginia at W.T. Woodson High School, before going back to RFK Stadium in 1977. During the next three seasons, the Diplomats achieved more regular season success and reached the postseason every year from 1978 until 1980. Consequently, the club experienced a spike in average attendance, nearing 20,000 fans a game by the 1980 season, although a significant number of tickets were "comps" or "papered" by the team's front office staff.

Following the end of the 1980 season, the original Diplomats club folded when then owner, the Madison Square Garden Corp., had accumulated losses of $6 million and team president Steve Danzansky could not gather enough money to keep the team alive. However, that same season the Detroit Express NASL franchise relocated to the Washington metropolitan area, renaming themselves the "Diplomats" due to perceived familiarity of the moniker to the area. However, a regression of attendance and a lack of field success sounded the death knell of the franchise, and the Diplomats folded following the 1981 season.

== History ==
=== Before the Dips ===
The Washington Whips were a soccer team based in Washington, D.C. that played in the United Soccer Association. The league was made up of teams imported from foreign leagues. The Washington club was actually Aberdeen F.C. from Scotland.

Following the 1967 season, the USA merged with the National Professional Soccer League to form the North American Soccer League with the teams from the former USA having to create their rosters from scratch. Their home field was RFK Stadium. The team's owner was Earl Foreman, later owner of the Virginia Squires of the American Basketball Association and commissioner of the original Major Indoor Soccer League. Edward T. Reynolds was the booth announcer for the club prior to the merger.

=== Original NASL franchise ===
The original Washington Diplomats first came into being when in 1974 when the North American Soccer League (NASL) granted a franchise to a Washington, D.C.–based business group. The team played all their home games at RFK Stadium in 1974, but in 1975 and 1976 they played most of their games at W.T. Woodson High School in Northern Virginia, including all of their 1976 games. They played indoor home matches at the neighboring D.C. Armory. In July 1975, the Diplomats' franchise was sold to a consortium headed by Stephen I. Danzansky, son of supermarket tycoon Joseph Danzansky. NASL Commissioner, Phil Woosnam described the sale as "the largest franchise transaction in our league's nine year history." That same season, the Diplomats played the New York Cosmos at RFK Stadium in what was only Pele's third league match for the Cosmos. The match, which ended in a 9-2 victory for New York, attracted a then-NASL record crowd of 35,620.

After a lackluster beginning to the franchise, the Diplomats qualified for the playoffs and increased average game attendance in each of their last three years of existence. Additionally, in their final year, the Diplomats were able to sign the future European Player of the Century Johan Cruyff. After the 1980 season the Diplomats folded when then owner, the Madison Square Garden Corp., had accumulated losses of $6 million and team president Steve Danzansky could not gather enough money to keep the team alive. The cheerleaders for the original Diplomats were known as the Honeydips until 1980 when their name was changed to the Sidekicks. The team also ran ad campaigns calling themselves "the Dips."

=== Express relocate to Washington ===
After the original Diplomats folded following the 1980 season, the Detroit Express moved to Washington to become the new Diplomats. This team only lasted for one season.

=== Rivalries ===
The Diplomats' greatest rivalry was with the New York Cosmos. This was especially true when Johan Cruyff was playing in DC and the Cosmos had Pelé, Franz Beckenbauer and Giorgio Chinaglia. When the Cosmos came to RFK the stadium was close to capacity even though the Diplomats usually lost. However, they were always competitive games.

== Year-by-year ==
Season	League record										Playoffs	Additional Honors	Top scorer(s)	
Season	Div	League	Pld	W	L	T	GF	GA	Pts	Position	Playoffs	Additional Honors	Name(s)	Goals
1974	1	NASL	22	7	12	1	29	36	70	Eastern Division; 4th place				
1975	–	NASL indoor	2	0	2	0	6	14	0	Region 3; 4th place				
1975	1	NASL	22	12	10	0	43	47	112	Eastern Division; 3rd place				
1976	–	NASL indoor	3	1	2	0	17	16	2	Eastern Regional; 2nd place				
1976	1	NASL	24	14	10	0	46	38	126	Atlantic Conference; Eastern Division; 3rd place	R1			
1977	1	NASL	26	10	16	0	39	42	98	Atlantic Conference; Eastern Division; 4th place				
1978	–	NASL indoor	9	5	4	0	57	58	na	Skelly Invitational; 3rd place			Garber	14
1978	1	NASL	30	16	14	0	50	36	167	National Conference; Eastern Division; Runners-up	Conf. QF			
1979	1	NASL	30	19	11	0	68	50	172	National Conference; Eastern Division; Runners-up	Conf. QF			
1980	1	NASL	32	17	15	0	72	61	159	National Conference; Eastern Division; Runners-up	Conf. QF			
1981	1	NASL	32	15	17	0	59	58	135	Eastern Division; 3rd place				

== Players ==
A number of high-profile soccer players lined out for the Washington Diplomats. Arguably the most famous were the Dutch pair of Johan Cruyff and Wim Jansen who had over 100 caps for the Netherlands between them and who represented the Dips between 1979 and 1981. Other international players to play for Washington included Tommy McConville who was capped 6 times by Ireland and Windsor del Llano who played 30 times for Bolivia. Future Real Madrid and Netherlands coach, Guus Hiddink also played for the Diplomats.

== Coaches ==
- (England) Dennis Viollet (1974–1977)
- (England) Gordon Bradley (1978–81)
- (England) Ken Furphy (1981)

== Staff & ownership ==
- (United States) Stephen Danzansky 1975–1978
- (United States) Sonny Werblin 1979–1980
- (United Kingdom) Jimmy Hill & Duncan Hill 1981

=== Average attendance per game ===
- 1974: 4,975
- 1975: 8,847
- 1976: 5,963
- 1977: 13,037
- 1978: 10,783
- 1979: 11,973
- 1980: 19,205
- 1981: 16,106

== See also ==
- D.C. United
- Team America (NASL)
- Washington Darts
- Washington Whips
- Washington Diplomats (1988–1990)
