= 1976 American Soccer League =

American Soccer League 1976 season
- Season: 1976
- Teams: 11
- Champions: Los Angeles Skyhawks
- Premiers: Los Angeles Skyhawks
- Top goalscorer: Jim Hinch (13); José Neto

Statistics of American Soccer League II in season 1976.

== League standings ==
Scoring system is as follows: Teams are awarded five points for a win and two points for a draw. Teams earn a bonus point for each goal scored up to three.

Eastern Division
Team	Pld	W	D	L	GF	GA	BP	Pts
New York Apollo	21	10	3	8	29	25	29	85
Rhode Island Oceaneers	21	9	3	9	31	23	31	82
Chicago Cats (Note: Chicago Cats were declared by ASL commissioner Bob Cousy to have forfeited an unplayed, season-ending match against Cleveland. The forfeit leveled the two teams with 80 points. At the same time Commissioner Cousy controversially gave the final playoff spot to Cleveland, even though Chicago held the first two tiebreakers; wins and goal-differential.)	21	10	3	8	25	22	24	80
Cleveland Cobras	21	9	4	8	27	32	27	80
Connecticut Yankees	21	9	0	12	35	40	30	75
New Jersey Americans	21	6	4	11	26	38	25	63

Notes:

Western Division
Team	Pld	W	D	L	GF	GA	BP	Pts
Los Angeles Skyhawks	21	13	6	2	41	15	35	112
Tacoma Tides	21	10	6	5	40	23	31	93
Utah Golden Spikers/Pioneers (Note: Golden Spikers expelled from league during the season and replaced by Pioneers franchise.)	20	10	3	7	28	22	28	84
Oakland Buccaneers	18	6	2	10	29	39	25	59
Sacramento Spirits	21	4	3	14	25	52	25	51

== ASL All-Stars ==
Player	Position
Brian Parkinson, Los Angeles	G
Ron Yeats, Los Angeles	D
Peter Christoforides, New York	D
Ken Fogarty, Los Angeles	D
Zygmunt Anczok, Chicago	D
Daniel Mammana, Utah	D
Frantz St. Lot, Rhode Island	D
Juan Cano, New Jersey	M
David Chadwick, Tacoma	M
Jimmy Rolland, Los Angeles	F
Gerald Hylkema, Oakland	F
Jose Neto, Rhode Island	F
Jimmy Hinch, Los Angeles	F
Vic Calabrese, Connecticut	F

== Playoffs ==
=== Bracket ===
Division semifinals
W2	Tacoma Tides	2
W3	Utah Pioneers	1
E2	Rhode Island Oceaneers	2
E3	Cleveland Cobras	1

Division finals
W1	Los Angeles Skyhawks	2
W2	Tacoma Tides	1
E1	New York Apollo	2
E2	Rhode Island Oceaneers	1

ASL Championship
W1	Los Angeles Skyhawks	2
E1	New York Apollo	1

=== Division semifinals ===
August 19	Tacoma Tides	2–1	Utah Pioneers	Cheney Stadium • Att. 1,080

August 20	Rhode Island Oceaneers	2–1	Cleveland Cobras	Pierce Memorial Field • Att. ???

=== Division finals ===
August 21	New York Apollo	2–1	Rhode Island Oceaneers	Hofstra Stadium • Att. 600 (est.)

August 21	Los Angeles Skyhawks	2–1(OT)	Tacoma Tides	Birmingham Stadium • Att. 7,778

=== Championship final ===
August 27, 1976
8:00 PM PST

Los Angeles Skyhawks (CA)	2–1	New York Apollo (NY)
Alty McKenzie (red card) (1st Half)'; Jimmy Hinch 70' (Rolland); Ane Mihailovich 83' (pen.)	Report	Danny Doran 38'

Birmingham Stadium, Los Angeles, California
Attendance: 9,379
Referee: (USA)
