= List of Cleveland Force (1978–1988) players =

Players for the original Cleveland Force (1978–88) of the Major Soccer League:

Regular season statistics only

== A ==
- (Argentina) Luis Alberto, M (1980–82) 47 games, 20 goals, 31 assists
- (Guernsey) Craig Allen, F (1982–88) 254 games, 275 goals, 180 assists
- (United States) Gary Allison, G (1979–80) 25 games, 4-10 record, 1 assist, 6.34 GAA
- (Scotland) Ian Anderson, D (1980–82) 48 games, 34 goals, 36 assists
- (United States) Desmond Armstrong, D (1986–88) 93 games, 14 goals, 26 assists
- (Argentina) Ruben Astigarraga, F (1979–82) 41 games, 39 goals, 41 assists
- (Ghana) Mohammad Attiah, F (1978–81) 37 games, 14 goals, 13 assists

== B ==
- (United States) Mike Barca, G (1978–79) 10 games, 3-4 record, 4.77 GAA
- (Wales) Mike Barry, M (1979–82) 68 games, 33 goals, 30 assists
- (Canada) Chris Bennett, F (1979–80) 25 games, 6 goals, 6 assists
- (Bermuda) Clyde Best, F (1979–80) 30 games, 33 goals, 16 assists
- (United States) Brian Bliss, D (1987–88) 51 games, 4 goals, 4 assists
- (United States) Rich Brands, G (1978–79) 13 games, 1-8 record, 7.99 GAA
- (England) John Brooks, D (1979–80) 9 games, 1 goal, 0 assists
- (United States) Cliff Brown, G (1979–81) 61 games, 24-24 record, 2 assists, 5.17 GAA
- (Canada) Brian Budd, F (1978–79) 19 games, 25 goals, 4 assists

== C ==
- (United States) Marine Cano, G (1980–81) 18 games, 5-4 record, 4.92 GAA
- (England) Peter Carr, D (1981–82) 14 games, 1 goal, 0 assists
- (United States) Caesar Cervin, F (1978–79) 19 games, 8 goals, 10 assists
- (England) Andy Chapman, F (1984–86) 59 games, 34 goals, 25 assists
- (United States) Fadi Choujaa, F (1982-1982) 2 games, 0 goals, 1 assists
- (Canada) Chris Chueden, M (1985–87) 44 games, 24 goals, 12 assists
- (United States) Lou Cioffi, G (1981–83) 17 games, 4-10 record, 1 goal, 5.50 GAA
- (Israel) Prosper Cohen, M-F (1980–82) 60 games, 30 goals, 24 assists
- (Croatia) Tom Condric, F (1981–82) 38 games, 3 goals, 7 assists
- (Scotland) Charlie Cooke, F (1981–82) 19 games, 4 goals, 0 assists
- (United States) Brooks Cryder, D (1979–80) 32 games, 6 goals, 3 assists
- (Trinidad and Tobago) Everald Cummings, F (1978–79) 6 games, 1 goal, 0 assists

== D ==
- (United States) Benny Dargle, D (1983–88) 247 games, 38 goals, 40 assists
- (Scotland) Vic Davidson, F (1982–84) 100 games, 79 goals, 56 assists
- (England) Trevor Dawkins, D (1980–84) 168 games, 16 goals, 23 assists
- (Canada) Pasquale de Luca, D (1985–88) 110 games, 19 goals, 23 assists
- (Argentina) Carlos DeVenutto, F (1979–80) 1 game, 0 goals, 1 assist
- (England) George Dewsnip, F (1980–82) 54 games, 18 goals, 26 assists
- (United States) Kyle Dietrich, G (1983–85) 5 games, 4-1 record, 4.71 GAA
- (Canada) Gino DiFlorio, F (1984–88) 128 games, 56 goals, 47 assists
- (Trinidad and Tobago) Tony Douglas (1978–79) 4 games, 0 goals, 1 assist
- (United States) Paul Dueker, G (1978–79) 1 game, 0-1 record, 14.00 GAA

== E ==
- (Wales) Mike England, D (1979–80) 11 games, 0 goals, 1 assist
- (United States) Gino Epifani, G (1987–88) 2 games, 0-0 record, 27.27 GAA
- (Canada) Pat Ercoli, F (1985–86) 29 games, 6 goals, 4 assists
- (United States) Bobby Joe Esposito, F (1987–88) 37 games, 10 goals, 4 assists
- (England) Gary Evans, M (1979–80) 8 games, 0 goals, 2 assists

== F ==
- (England) Gordon Fearnley, F (1978–79) 4 games, 1 goal, 2 assists
- (Canada) Drew Ferguson, D (1983–84) 44 games, 20 goals, 13 assists
- (United States) George Fernandez, D (1983–85) 6 games, 0 goals, 1 assist
- (Brazil) Ivair Ferreira, F (1980–81) 29 games, 16 goals, 4 assists
- (Haiti) Pat Fidelia, F (1979–80) 29 games, 10 goals, 9 assists
- (United States) Trevor Franklin, D (1981–82) 26 games, 2 goals, 6 assists
- (England) Keith Furphy, F (1981–85) 188 games, 185 goals, 105 assists
- (Scotland) Graham Fyfe, F (1980–81) 33 games, 38 goals, 20 assists

== G ==
- (United States) Randy Garber, D (1978–79) 1 games, 0 goals, 0 assists
- (Mexico) Freddie Garcia (1978–79) 6 games, 3 goals, 3 assists
- (United States) Poli Garcia, F (1979–80) 29 games, 21 goals, 15 assists
- (United States) Tony Graham, F (1980–81) 19 games, 1 goal, 0 assists
- (United States) Charlie Greene, M (1982–84) 41 games, 15 goals, 18 assists
- (United States) Dave Grimaldi, D (1979–82) 110 games, 5 goals, 11 assists

== H ==
- (Finland) Kai Haaskivi, F-M (1982–88) 241 games, 159 goals, 243 assists
- (United States) Bret Hall, D (1983–85) 62 games, 2 goals, 8 assists
- (United States) Alan Hamlyn, D (1978–79) 23 games, 6 goals, 5 assists
- (United States) John Houska, G (1980–82) 36 games, 10-19 record, 5.44 GAA
- (United States) Bob Hritz, F (1978–79) 10 games, 2 goals, 1 assist
- (England) Alan Hudson, F (1979–80) 13 games, 6 goals, 13 assists
- (England) Jimmy Husband, M-F (1981–82) 33 games, 9 goals, 6 assists

== I ==
- (Serbia) Josef Ilic, F (1982–83) 28 games, 9 goals, 10 assists
- (Serbia) Radmilo Ivancevic, G (1982–83) 17 games, 8-6 record, 2 assists, 5.11 GAA

== J ==
- (United States) Bernie James, D (1982–87) 226 games, 19 goals, 36 assists
- (Canada) Wayne Jentas, D (1980–81) 38 games, 4 goals, 7 assists
- (United States) P.J. Johns, G (1984–88) 86 games, 45-35 record, 1 goal, 13 assists, 3.97 GAA
- (United States) Scott Jones, D (1978–80) 10 games, 8 goals, 1 assist

== K ==
- (Cameroon) Michel Kaham, D (1982–85) 74 games, 3 goals, 7 assists
- (Iran) Ali Kazemaini, M (1984–88) 144 games, 74 goals, 47 assists
- (England) Michael King, F (1986–88) 70 games, 21 goals, 6 assists
- (England) Paul Kitson, F (1986–88) 23 games, 6 goals, 3 assists
- (Denmark) Tommy Praefke Kristiansen, M (1983–85) 35 games, 9 goals, 5 assists

== L ==
- (Serbia) Miodrag Lacevic, F (1980–81) 28 games, 3 goals, 4 assists
- (Israel) Simon Look, F (1980–82) 65 games, 44 goals, 21 assists
- (Denmark) Flemming Lund, M (1983–84) 11 games, 0 goals, 1 assist
- (United States) Glenn Lurie, F (1987–88) 8 games, 2 goals, 1 assist

== M ==
- (Socialist Federal Republic of Yugoslavia) Danilo Mandic, D (1981–82) 9 games, 2 goals, 0 assists
- (Canada) Hector Marinaro, D (1983–84) 5 games, 0 goals, 1 assist
- (United States) Jim May, G (1978–79) 12 games, 1-6 record, 1 assist, 6.01 GAA
- (Canada) James McDonald, D (1979–80) 3 games, 0 goals, 0 assists
- (Brazil) Rildo Menezes, D (1978–79) 16 games, 2 goals, 0 assists
- (United States) Dennis Mepham, M (1984–88) 173 games, 52 goals, 51 assists
- (United States) Gene Michalow, D (1978–79) 3 games, 0 goals, 0 assists
- (Scotland) Peter Millar, M-D (1983–85) 63 games, 15 goals, 15 assists
- (Canada) Bruce Miller, M (1979–80) 9 games, 5 goals, 4 assists
- (United States) Charlie Morgan, D (1985–87) 37 games, 0 goals, 5 assists
- (United States) Tim Murphy, D (1978–79) 23 games, 1 goal, 6 assists

== N ==
- (North Macedonia) George Nanchoff, F (1981–85) 110 games, 54 goals, 39 assists
- (North Macedonia) Louie Nanchoff, F (1982–85) 122 games, 90 goals, 79 assists
- (United States) John Nelson, F (1978–79) 12 games, 3 goals, 4 assists
- (United States) Steve Newman, F (1978–79) 7 games, 0 goals, 0 assists
- (Croatia) Slavko Njegus, G (1981–82) 6 games, 1-2 record, 6.90 GAA
- (Mozambique) Victor Nogueira, G (1987–88) 20 games, 11-8 record, 2 assists, 3.69 GAA
- (United States) Steve Norris, D (1978–79) 17 games, 1 goal, 1 assist
- (United States) Peter Notaro, F (1979–80) 8 games, 4 goals, 1 assist
- (Poland) Marian Nowacki, D (1981–82) 13 games, 0 goals, 4 assists

== O ==
- (United States) John O'Hara, D (1980–81) 37 games, 1 goal, 16 assists
- (Nigeria) Francis Okaroh, D (1987–88) 13 games, 0 goals, 0 assists
- (United States) Hugh O'Neill (1979–80) 15 games, 1 goal, 2 assists
- (Canada) Ross Ongaro, F (1982–84) 27 games, 6 goals, 5 assists

== P ==
- (United States) Jose Perna (1978–79) 9 games, 0 goals, 2 assists
- (United States) Les Peterson, D (1978–80) 48 games, 5 goals, 10 assists
- (Argentina) Oscar Pisano, D (1979–80) 16 games, 2 goals, 2 assists
- (Nigeria) Ben Popoola, F (1979–80) 8 games, 5 goals, 4 assists

== R ==
- (Socialist Federal Republic of Yugoslavia) Branko Radović, D (1982–83) 40 games, 2 goals, 3 assists
- (Bosnia and Herzegovina) Joe Raduka, D (1983–87) 105 games, 6 goals, 11 assists
- (Brazil) Ricardo Rodrigues, F (1982–83) 34 games, 7 goals, 7 assists
- (Sweden) Ulf Ryberg, M (1985–86) 8 games, 1 goal, 1 assist

== S ==
- (United States) Walter Schlothauer, D (1980–81) 28 games, 6 goals, 6 assists
- (United States) Andy Schmetzer, M (1986–88) 60 games, 21 goals, 13 assists
- (United States) Walt Schmetzer, M (1986–88) 36 games, 3 goals, 3 assists
- (United States) Ray Schnettgoecke, D (1979–80) 29 games, 4 goals, 5 assists
- (Bermuda) Derek Scott, F (1981–82) 15 games, 2 goals, 0 assists
- (Portugal) Seninho, F (1987–88) 24 games, 6 goals, 1 assist
- (England) Roy Sinclair, D (1978–81) 62 games, 22 goals, 29 assists
- (Poland) Krys Sobieski, G (1983–85) 49 games, 26-16 record, 4 assists, 4.47 GAA
- (United States) Blaz Stimac, M (1978–79) 17 games, 8 goals, 6 assists
- (United States) John Stollmeyer, D (1986–88) 101 games, 29 goals, 21 assists
- (England) David Stride, D (1981–82) 14 games, 0 goals, 4 assists
- (United States) Tony Suarez, F (1981–83) 9 games, 4 goals, 2 assists
- (Canada) Mike Sweeney, M (1984–87) 87 games, 18 goals, 36 assists

== T ==
- (Hungary) Alex Tarnoczi, M (1983–86) 83 games, 24 goals, 17 assists
- (United States) Kevin Terry, F (1979–82) 85 games, 12 goals, 4 assists

== U ==
- (United States) Roman Urbanczuk, F (1978–79) 2 games, 0 goals, 0 assists

== V ==
- (United States) Cris Vaccaro, G (1982–87) 149 games, 89-51 record, 2 goals, 24 assists, 4.57 GAA
- (Canada) Carl Valentine, M (1985–88) 124 games, 83 goals, 66 assists
- (Brazil) John Victor, D (1980–84) 121 games, 28 goals, 29 assists
- (United States) Gary Vogel, D (1982–83) 17 games, 2 goals, 2 assists

== W ==
- (England) Peter Ward, F (1984–87) 133 games, 89 goals, 58 assists
- (England) Ron Wigg, F (1979–80) 10 games, 5 goals, 3 assists
- (Austria) Dieter Wimmer, F (1980–81) 7 games, 0 goals, 0 assists

== Y ==
- (England) Mark Yeeles, M (1978–79) 17 games, 3 goals, 1 assist

== Z ==
- (United States) Elias Zurita, F (1987–88) 26 games, 3 goals, 1 assist
