= Phoenix Fire (soccer) =

- Founded: September 25, 1979; 46 years ago
- Dissolved: March 27, 1980; 45 years ago
- Stadium: Hoy Stadium
- Capacity: 15,000
- Owner: Leonard E. Lesser
- Head Coach: Jimmy Gabriel
- League: American Soccer League

The Phoenix Fire was an American professional soccer team.

== History ==
Founded in September 1979 as an expansion team ahead of the 1980 American Soccer League season, the team folded in March 1980, during pre-season. The club was one of two expansion teams for 1980, the other being the Golden Gate Gales.

== Players ==
The below is the complete roster for the Phoenix Fire. The team was coached by Jimmy Gabriel.

Note: Flags indicate national team as defined under FIFA eligibility rules; some limited exceptions apply. Players may hold more than one non-FIFA nationality.

| No. | Pos. | Nation | Player |
|---|---|---|---|
| 1 | GK | ENG | Kieron Baker |
| 2 | DF | USA | Manny Matos |
| 3 | MF | USA | Ray Ochoa |
| 4 | DF | ENG | Roger Verdi |
| 5 | DF | ENG | John Rowlands |
| 6 | DF | ENG | Neil Hague |
| 7 | FW | SCO | Jimmy Rolland |
| 8 | GK | USA | Tom Lytle |
| 9 | FW | ENG | Terry Shanahan |

| No. | Pos. | Nation | Player |
|---|---|---|---|
| 11 | MF | ENG | Terry Hickey |
| 12 | FW | USA | Darrell Oak |
| 14 | MF | ENG | Tom Jenkins |
| 15 | FW | USA | Tim Logush |
| 16 | FW | COL | Victor Arbalez |
| 17 | FW | ENG | Harry Redknapp |
| 18 | MF | USA | Dean Shemeld |
| 20 | MF | USA | Jim Anglim |
