= Victor Arbelaez =

Colombian footballer and coach (1953-2007)

Personal information
- Full name: Victor Alberto Arbelaez
- Date of birth: 14 August 1953
- Place of birth: Bogotá, Colombia
- Date of death: 11 October 2007 (aged 54)
- Place of death: Las Vegas, United States
- Position(s): Forward

College career
Years	Team	Apps	(Gls)
- University of San Francisco

Senior career*
Years	Team	Apps	(Gls)
1976	San Diego Jaws	3	(0)
1976	Sacramento Spirits		
1977	Las Vegas Quicksilvers	13	(1)
1978	San Diego Sockers	5	(0)
1978–1979	Pittsburgh Spirit	8	(2)
1979	Las Vegas Seagulls		
1980	Phoenix Fire	0	(0)
Total		29	(3)
- *Club domestic league appearances and goals

Victor Alberto Arbelaez (14 August 1953 – 11 October 2007) was a Colombian professional soccer player and coach.

== Career ==
Born in Bogotá in 1953, Arbelaez moved to the United States in 1966. He attended the University of San Francisco, where he won the 1975 NCAA championship. He played professionally for San Diego Jaws, Sacramento Spirits, Las Vegas Quicksilvers, San Diego Sockers, Pittsburgh Spirit, Las Vegas Seagulls and Phoenix Fire. In 1980 he was contracted to play with ASL expansion team the Phoenix Fire, but the team folded in pre-season.

After retiring as a player he worked as an assistant coach at the University of Nevada, Las Vegas and as head coach of Bishop Gorman High School.

He died on 11 October 2007, aged 54.
