= Trevor Franklin =

Trevor Franklin may refer to:

- Trevor Franklin (cricketer) (born 1962), New Zealand cricketer
- Trevor Franklin (soccer) (born 1957), retired English-American soccer defender
