= Cryder =

Cryder is a surname. Notable people with the surname include:

- Bob Cryder (born 1956), American football player
- Brooks Cryder (born 1955), American soccer player
