= Dan Wood (soccer) =

American soccer coach and golfer (1946–2020)

Personal information
- Full name: Daniel Phillip Wood
- Date of birth: May 21, 1946
- Place of birth: Elmira, New York, U.S.
- Date of death: May 7, 2020 (aged 73)
- Place of death: Port St. Lucie, Florida, U.S.
- Height: 6 ft 1 in (1.85 m)

Managerial career
- Years: Team
- 1971–1975: Cornell University
- 1976: Tacoma Tides
- 1978: Colorado Caribous
- 1979–1980: Atlanta Chiefs
- 1984: Minnesota Strikers (assistant)

Daniel Phillip Wood (May 21, 1946 – May 7, 2020) was an American collegiate and professional soccer coach. He was also a professional golfer who was the top money winner on the 1996 Senior Series Golf Tour.

== Youth ==
Wood was born in Elmira, New York and graduated from Ithaca High School in 1964. An outstanding athlete, he was inducted into the school's hall of fame in 2004. He grew up in New York State and attended Lehigh University in Bethlehem, Pennsylvania for three semesters where he was a three sport (soccer, baseball and basketball) letterman. He transferred to Tufts University in 1966 and earned his bachelor's degree in sociology in 1968. While at Tufts, he was also elected to Phi Beta Kappa and was magna cum laude. Wood was the captain of the Tuft’s 1968 baseball team and also lettered in soccer, basketball and football (placekicker.) He was awarded an NCAA Postgraduate Scholarship to study at Cornell University, where he became the soccer and tennis coach and earned a PhD in Education in 1977.

== Soccer coach ==
Over his five years as the Cornell Big Red coach, he took the soccer team to a 52–20–6 record and five NCAA post season appearances. In 1972, Cornell reached the NCAA Final Four where it fell to UCLA. Wood is also famous for recruiting future United States national team coach Bruce Arena, who was playing on the Big Red lacrosse team, into the men’s soccer team after injuries decimated the team’s goalkeeper corps. In December 1975, Wood resigned from Cornell to pursue a professional career. In 1976, Booth Gardner, owner of the expansion American Soccer League (ASL) franchise Tacoma Tides, hired Wood as the team’s first, and only, head coach. Despite being in its first year, Wood took the team to second place in the Western Division and a berth in the ASL semifinals where the team lost to the eventual champion Los Angeles Skyhawks. When the Tides folded at the end of the 1976 season, Wood returned to Cornell to finish his doctorate in education in 1977 and then moved to the Colorado Caribous of North American Soccer League (NASL) as the assistant coach. Wood was promoted to head coach for the last month of the 1978 season, but was unable to replicate his success at Cornell and Tacoma as the Caribous went 8–22 and well out of playoff contention. At the end of the season, the team moved to Atlanta, Georgia, becoming the Atlanta Chiefs. Despite his lack of success with the Caribous, Wood was retained by the team management in the move and served for two years as the Chiefs’ head coach. In 1980, he brought David Chadwick, his former Tides assistant coach, in as a joint head coach. When Wood left the Chiefs during the 1980 season, Chadwick replaced him as head coach. In 1984, Wood was the assistant head coach under Chadwick with the Minnesota Strikers, the last year of the NASL.

== Golf ==
Wood, who was an outstanding amateur golfer through all his years as a coach, turned professional in 1980. He entered the club pro ranks in 1985 after several years of competition on various Florida mini-tours. He attained full PGA membership in 1988 and he tied for second in the 1988 North Florida PGA Section Championship, qualified for the 1992 PGA Championship at Bellerive Country Club in St. Louis, and won the Florida PGA Open in 1995. In 1996, he was the top money winner on the Senior Series Golf Tour and earned his card on the Senior PGA Tour. He played the Senior PGA Tour full-time starting in 1997 and in 1998, he had several top-10 finishes, including a tie for seventh at the U.S. Senior Open, one of 52 events that he played on the Senior PGA Tour. In 1998, he led the Senior PGA Tour in eagles and achieved an all-around statistical ranking of 16th among all Senior Tour players.

Wood was the golf director and managing owner of the Winter Springs (Florida) Golf Club from 1985–1998. He was the women's golf head coach at Ithaca College (New York) until 2015, where he was assisted by his wife Sandra whom he married in 1986 and who was the Women's Club Champion at both the Cornell University Golf Club, the Orange Tree (Florida) Golf Club and the PGA Golf Club in Port St. Lucie, Florida.

== Death ==
Wood died on May 7, 2020.
