= Hylkema =

Hylkema is a surname. Notable people with the surname include:

- Gerald Hylkema (1946–2002), Dutch footballer
- Thomas Hylkema (born 1988), Dutch racing driver
