= Hight (surname) =

Hight is a surname. Notable people with the surname include:

- Ahmo Hight (1973–2023), American fitness model, swimsuit model and actress
- Elena Hight (born 1989), American snowboarder
- James Hight (1870–1958), New Zealand university professor, educational administrator and historian
- Joe Hight, American journalist
- Michael Hight (born 1961), New Zealand artist
