= Jerry Kazarian =

Armenian-American soccer player

Personal information
- Date of birth: March 25, 1954 (age 72)
- Place of birth: Yerevan, Armenian SSR, Soviet Union
- Position: Forward

Youth career
- 1973: Los Angeles SC

Senior career*
Years	Team	Apps	(Gls)
1974–1975	Los Angeles Aztecs	9	(4)
1975	San Jose Earthquakes	3	(0)
1976	Los Angeles Skyhawks		
- * Club domestic league appearances and goals

Jerry Kazarian is a retired Armenian-American soccer forward who spent two seasons in the North American Soccer League.

Kazarian played for the Greater Los Angeles Soccer Club when he signed with the Los Angeles Aztecs of the North American Soccer League. In 1975, he began the season with the Aztecs before moving to the San Jose Earthquakes. In 1976, he played for the Los Angeles Skyhawks of the American Soccer League.
