= Marine Cano =

American soccer player and coach (born 1954)

Personal information
- Date of birth: September 13, 1954 (age 72)
- Place of birth: Los Angeles, California, U.S.
- Position: Goalkeeper

Senior career*
Years	Team	Apps	(Gls)
1976–1977	Los Angeles Skyhawks		
1978	Rhyl FC		
1978–1979	Fort Lauderdale Strikers	9	(0)
1979–1980	California Sunshine		
1980	Cleveland Cobras	18	(0)
1980–1981	Cleveland Force (indoor)		
1985	Los Angeles United		
1986–1987, 1990	Los Angeles Heat		

International career
1978	United States		

Managerial career
- 1975–1980: Bishop Montgomery HS (boys)
- 1980–1982: UCLA (assistant – men)
- 1984–1993: CSU Dominguez Hills (women)
- 1985–1993: CSU Dominguez Hills (men)
- 1987–1988: Los Angeles Heat
- 1994–2005: UC Irvine (women)
- 2008–2017: Soka (men)
- 2009–2012: Soka (women)
- 2018–2022: CSU Dominguez Hills (women)
- * Club domestic league appearances and goals

Marine Cano (born September 13, 1954) is an American collegiate soccer head coach and a retired professional goalkeeper. He played in the North American Soccer League, Major Indoor Soccer League, American Soccer League and Western Soccer Alliance. He is currently the head coach of the women's soccer team at CSU Dominguez Hills.

== Playing career ==
Born in 1954, Cano grew up in South Bay, Los Angeles. He played in the inaugural AYSO season when he was 10-years old alongside his friend Sigi Schmid. Cano prepped at Bishop Montgomery High School in Torrance, where he played basketball and was the team captain during his junior and senior years. The school did not have a soccer program at the time.

In 1976, Cano signed his first professional contract with the Los Angeles Skyhawks of the American Soccer League at the age of 21. There, he was the backup to Brian Parkinson and helped the Skyhawks to the ASL championship. In the spring of 1978, he briefly played for Welsh side Rhyl FC. He was selected to be a member of the U.S. Men's National Team for its Caribbean Tour that summer. Later in the fall, he signed with the Fort Lauderdale Strikers of the North American Soccer League.

In 1979, Cano returned to the ASL with the California Sunshine. He stayed in the ASL the following year to play for the Cleveland Cobras. That fall, he signed with the Cleveland Force of the Major Indoor Soccer League. In 1985, after a four-year hiatus, he joined the independent Los Angeles United. In 1986, he signed with the Los Angeles Heat of the Western Soccer Alliance. The next season he took on the role of player-manager, coaching the team and serving as backup to national team member David Vanole, and solely coached the team in 1988. He returned to the Heat as a player in 1990, now part of the American Professional Soccer League. He permanently retired from playing after the conclusion of that season.

== Coaching career ==
Even before retiring from playing in 1990, Cano had an extensive coaching resume. His first experience came when he was still in high school, as he managed one of the first AYSO girls' youth teams. He founded and became the co-head coach of the boys' soccer program at his alma mater, Bishop Montgomery High School, alongside his friend Sigi Schmid just two years after graduating. In 1980, he was hired as an assistant coach by Schmid at UCLA.

In 1984, Cano founded and became the head coach of the CSU Dominguez Hills women's soccer team. A year later, he took over the men's program in addition to leading the women's side. Cano led the women's team to the NCAA Division II national championship in 1991. In 1994, he was hired at UC Irvine to become the Director of Soccer, supervising both men's and women's programs, and the women's head coach by Dan Guerrero. He resigned after the 2005 season, having compiled a record of 111–94–27 in his twelve seasons as coach. In 2006, he was hired by Soka University to start an intercollegiate soccer program. The men's team had their inaugural season in 2008 and the women's in 2009. In 2018 he accepted to become the women's soccer head coach at CSU Dominguez Hills for the second time.

Outside of collegiate soccer, Cano served as the head coach for the Los Angeles Heat in the Western Soccer Alliance in 1987 and 1988. He has also been a goalkeeping advisor for the Los Angeles Galaxy during Sigi Schmid's stints. He is the director of "Mr. Soccer" youth soccer camps that attract more than 1,000 people.
