= Andy Rymarczuk =

American soccer player

Personal information
- Full name: Andrew Rymarczuk
- Date of birth: 1951
- Place of birth: Philadelphia, Pennsylvania, USA
- Date of death: February 23, 1997 (aged 45–46)
- Place of death: Philadelphia, Pennsylvania, USA
- Height: 6 ft 1 in (1.85 m)
- Position: Forward

Youth career
- 1969–1972: Penn State

Senior career*
Years	Team	Apps	(Gls)
1973–1975	Rochester Lancers	52	(3)
1976	Tacoma Tides		

International career
1973	United States	5	(0)
- * Club domestic league appearances and goals

Andrew Rymarczuk (1951 – February 23, 1997) is a former U.S. soccer forward. He played three seasons in the North American Soccer League and at least one in the American Soccer League. He also earned five caps with the U.S. national team in 1973.

== Youth ==
Rymarczuk attended North Catholic High School where he was a 1st team All-Catholic player and a member of the 1967 Championship team. A 1969 graduate, he was posthumously inducted into the North Catholic Soccer Hall of Fame in 2009. He attended Penn State where he played on the men's soccer team from 1969 to 1972. He was a third team All American in 1971 and a 1972 first team All American. He scored thirty goals and added nineteen assists during his four years with the Nittany Lions.

== Club career ==
The Rochester Lancers of the North American Soccer League (NASL) drafted Rymarczuk in the first round of the 1973 NASL College Draft. He spent three seasons with the Lancers before being acquired by the expansion Tacoma Tides of the American Soccer League in 1976. The Tides folded at the end of the season.

== National team ==
His first cap came on September 9, 1973, in a 1–0 win over Bermuda. He came on for Barry Barto. He gained his first start on November 5, 1973, a 1–0 loss to Haiti. His last game was a November 15, 1973, loss to Israel. He later played in an unofficial match, a 10–0 loss to Italy on April 2, 1975.
