= Miguel Lopez (soccer, born 1953) =

Salvadoran-American soccer player

Miguel López
Personal information
- Full name: Miguel Angel Lopez
- Date of birth: October 1, 1953 (age 73)
- Place of birth: Santa Tecla, El Salvador
- Height: 5 ft 9 in (1.75 m)
- Position: Defender

Youth career
- Whittier College

Senior career*
Years	Team	Apps	(Gls)
1976	Los Angeles Aztecs	15	(0)
- Los Angeles Skyhawks
- South Bay United
1980	United Armenians		

International career
1977	United States	1	(0)
- * Club domestic league appearances and goals

Miguel Angel López was a soccer defender who played one season in the North American Soccer League. Born in El Salvador, he played for the U.S. national team.

López graduated from San Gabriel High School and attended Whittier College, playing on the men's soccer team.

López played with the Los Angeles Aztecs of the North American Soccer League in 1976. He earned his cap in a 3–0 loss to Mexico on September 27, 1977. Don Droege replaced him in the 62nd minute. López also played for South Bay United and United Armenians, both of the Greater Los Angeles Soccer League. He also played for the Los Angeles Skyhawks in the American Soccer League.
