= Leif Dag Werneid =

Norwegian footballer (born 1943)

Personal information
- Date of birth: 1943 (age 82–83)
- Height: 5 ft 9 in (1.75 m)
- Position: Forward

Senior career*
Years	Team	Apps	(Gls)
- Lisleby
1968	Los Angeles Wolves	21	(4)
1974	Torrance Sports Club		
1974	Torrance Blue Stars		
1976	South Bay United		
1976–1977	Los Angeles Skyhawks		
- * Club domestic league appearances and goals

Leif Dag Werneid (born 1943) was a Norwegian professional footballer.

He played as a forward for the Los Angeles Wolves of the North American Soccer League, scoring 4 goals in 21 appearances in the 1968 season, before playing for Torrance Sports Club, Torrance Blue Stars, South Bay United and Los Angeles Skyhawks He also played for Lisleby in his native Norway.
