= Len Dudkowski =

American soccer player

Personal information
- Full name: Leonard Dudkowski
- Place of birth: United States
- Height: 5 ft 10 in (1.78 m)
- Positions: Forward; defender

Youth career
- 1971–1974: Harris Teachers College

Senior career*
| Years | Team | Apps | (Gls) |
| 1975 | Cincinnati Comets | | |
| 1975 | Boston Minutemen | | |
| 1976 | Tacoma Tides | | |
| 1977 | St. Louis Stars | | |
- * Club domestic league appearances and goals

Leonard "Len" Dudkowski is an American retired soccer player. He played professionally in the North American Soccer League and American Soccer League.

Dudkowski attended Harris Teachers College where he played on the men's soccer team. In 1974, he turned professional with the Cincinnati Comets of the American Soccer League. In 1975, he moved up to the Boston Minutemen of the North American Soccer League. In 1976, he played for the Tacoma Tides of the American Soccer League. He may have played on loan to the Tides from the St. Louis Stars. In 1977, he played for the Stars.
