= Darrell Oak =

American soccer player

Personal information
- Date of birth: August 30, 1954 (age 72)
- Place of birth: Jamestown, North Dakota, United States
- Height: 6 ft 0 in (1.83 m)
- Position: Forward

Senior career*
Years	Team	Apps	(Gls)
1976–1978	Seattle Sounders	6	(0)
1980	Phoenix Fire	0	(0)
1985	FC Seattle		
Total		6+	(0+)
- * Club domestic league appearances and goals

Darrell Oak (born August 30, 1954) is an American former professional soccer player who played as a forward.

== Career ==
Born in Jamestown, North Dakota, Oak played for Seattle Sounders, Phoenix Fire and FC Seattle. In 1980 he was contracted to play with ASL expansion team the Phoenix Fire, but the team folded in pre-season.
