= Chris Agoliati =

American soccer player

Personal information
- Date of birth: November 3, 1951 (age 74)
- Place of birth: Staten Island, United States
- Height: 5 ft 9 in (1.75 m)
- Positions: Forward; midfielder

College career
Years	Team	Apps	(Gls)
1969–1973	Cornell Big Red		

Senior career*
Years	Team	Apps	(Gls)
1973–1974	Connecticut Wildcats	30	(0)
1974–1975	Boston Minutemen	6	(1)
1975–1976	Tacoma Tides	28	(0)
1976–1977	New York Cosmos	1	(0)
- * Club domestic league appearances and goals

Chris Agoliati is an American former soccer player who played at least two seasons in the American Soccer League and three in the North American Soccer League.

Agoliati graduated from the Staten Island Academy in 1969 and Cornell University in 1973. He was an All-American, first team All Ivy on the Big Red soccer team. In 1973, he signed with the Connecticut Wildcats and started as a defender at left fullback in front of Soccer Hall of Famer Tony Diccio. In 1975, he moved to the Boston Minutemen of the North American Soccer League. In 1975 on national television Agoliati scored a goal against Pele and the New York Cosmos. At the end of the season he signed with the expansion Tacoma Tides in the ASL. He started at the mid-field the whole season. The next year Agoliati moved back to the NASL, this time with the New York Cosmos with teammates Pele, Beckanbauer, Chiniglia, and Shep Messing. Agoliati then retired at the age of 27 to pursue a career as a licensed real estate broker in New York State.

In 1979, he purchased the Paramount Theater of Stapleton, Staten Island and turned it into a disco and rock and roll club. Coming from Warner Communications and Atlantic Records with the contacts he became an established rock and roll promoter. As a rock and roll promoter, the venue brought such acts as the Ramones, Talking Heads, the B-52's, Billy Idol, Joan Jett, A Flock of Seagulls, the Specials, Paul Shaffer and the World's Most Dangerous Band, Southside Johnny and the Asbury Jukes and many more.
