= David Chadwick (footballer) =

English football player and manager (born 1943)

Dave Chadwick
Personal information
- Full name: David Edwin Chadwick
- Date of birth: 19 August 1943 (age 83)
- Place of birth: Ootacamund, Madras, British India
- Height: 5 ft 6 in (1.68 m)
- Position: Winger

Youth career
- 1959–1960: Southampton

Senior career*
Years	Team	Apps	(Gls)
1960–1966	Southampton	25	(1)
1966–1970	Middlesbrough	102	(3)
1970–1972	Halifax Town	95	(15)
1972–1974	AFC Bournemouth	36	(4)
1972–1973	Torquay United	10	(0)
1974–1975	Dallas Tornado	35	(5)
1974–1975	Gillingham	35	(3)
1976	Tacoma Tides	17	(9)
1977–1979	Fort Lauderdale Strikers	24	(2)

Managerial career
- 1976: Tacoma Tides (assistant)
- 1980–1981: Atlanta Chiefs
- 1982: Georgia Generals
- 1983–1984: Fort Lauderdale Strikers
- 1984: Minnesota Strikers
- 1986: Atlanta Datagraphic
- * Club domestic league appearances and goals

David Edwin Chadwick (born 19 August 1943) is an English former football player and manager. A winger, he spent most of his career in England before emigrating to the United States where he went on to become a manager.

== Playing career ==
Chadwick was born in Ootacamund, India. He began his career as a junior with Southampton, and became the youngest player to appear for their reserves on 31 October 1959, aged 16 years 73 days. He turned professional in October 1960 and made his first-team debut on 4 November 1961, at home to Bristol Rovers in place of the injured Terry Paine. His six years at the Dell were spent in the shadow of Paine and John Sydenham and as a result he only made 25 league appearances for The Saints, in which he scored once. In July 1966 he moved to Middlesbrough, costing the Ayresome Park side £10,000, and slotted straight into the side, making his Boro debut on 20 August against Colchester United.

He played the last of just over 100 league games for Boro on 27 September 1969 against Blackpool, before moving to Halifax Town in January 1970. In February 1972, after 15 goals in 95 league games, he left the Shay to join AFC Bournemouth, but struggled to make an impact. He was loaned to Torquay United in December 1972, and in the summer of 1974 joined NASL side Dallas Tornado on loan.

In September 1974 he joined Gillingham on a free transfer. He remained at Priestfield Stadium for only one season before returning to Dallas for the 1975 NASL season. He spent the 1976 season with the newly formed American Soccer League side Tacoma Tides where he served as a player and assistant coach. The Tides lasted only a single season before folding. On a minor note, Chadwick coached Bruce Arena, the future manager of the United States men's national soccer team, who was a Tides back up goalkeeper. In 1977, Chadwick returned to the NASL with the Fort Lauderdale Strikers.

== Coaching career ==
In 1980 Dan Wood, who had been the head coach of the Tacoma Tides and was now the head coach of the Atlanta Chiefs, brought Chadwick to the Chiefs as a joint head coach. Following Wood's departure at the end of the season, Chadwick became the sole head coach the following year. The Chiefs folded after the 1981 season, but Chadwick remained in the city, becoming head coach of the newly formed Georgia Generals as they played their first season in the Second Division American Soccer League. After a successful season with what started as a scratch side, Chadwick returned to the NASL as head coach of Fort Lauderdale Strikers in 1983, signing with the team in September. He followed the franchise to Minnesota for the 1984 season and continued to coach the team through the last season of the NASL. In 1986, he coached the amateur Atlanta Datagraphic.

After coaching for the United States Soccer Federation, Chadwick became Technical Director and Director of Coaching at AFC Lightning a youth side based in Atlanta, Georgia. There, he led his U18 team to victory, to become national champions. (This was a first for any Georgia team.)

In 2001 "Chaddy" was inducted into the Georgia State Soccer Association's Hall of Fame. In June 2007, after 16 years coaching at AFC Lightning, David Chadwick retired.
