= Charlie Myers (soccer) =

American soccer player

Personal information
- Full name: Charles Myers
- Place of birth: United States
- Height: 6 ft 2 in (1.88 m)
- Position: Forward

Youth career
- 1971–1975: University of Baltimore

Senior career*
Years	Team	Apps	(Gls)
1976	Dallas Tornado	0	(0)
1976	→ Tacoma Tides (loan)	20	(6)
- * Club domestic league appearances and goals

Charlie Myers is an American retired football (soccer) forward who played professionally in the American Soccer League.

Myers graduated from Overlea High School where he was a member of the school's State Championship soccer team. He attended the University of Baltimore where he played on the men's soccer team from 1971 to 1975. His senior season, Baltimore won the NCAA Men's Division II Soccer Championship and Myers was selected as the Tournament MVP. Myers was also a 1975 Honorable Mention (third team) All American. He was inducted into the school's Athletic Hall of Fame in 2006. Drafted by the Dallas Tornado of the North American Soccer League, Myers was loaned to the Tacoma Tides for the 1976 American Soccer League season.

He was inducted into the Maryland Soccer Hall of Fame in 1996.
