= Windsor del Llano =

Bolivian footballer (born 1949)

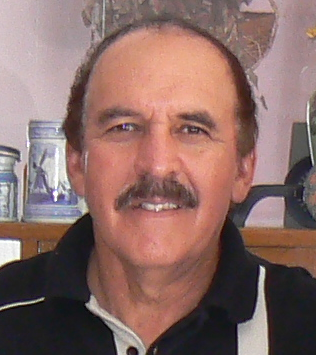

Personal information
- Full name: Windsor Alfred del Llano Suárez
- Date of birth: 17 August 1949 (age 77)
- Place of birth: Cochabamba, Bolivia
- Height: 1.70 m (5 ft 7 in)
- Position: Midfielder

Senior career*
Years	Team	Apps	(Gls)
1968	Jorge Wilstermann		
1969	Club Deportivo Petroleros		
1970	Philadelphia Spartans		
1971	New York Hota		
1972–1973	Baltimore Bays		
1974	Washington Diplomats	20	(2)
1975	Jorge Wilstermann		
1976	Bolívar		
1976	Tacoma Tides		(5)
1977–1978	Jorge Wilstermann		
1979–1980	The Strongest		
1981	Botafogo		
1981	Blooming		
1982–1983	Jorge Wilstermann		
1988	Miami Sharks		

International career
1973	United States	1	(0)
1975–1981	Bolivia	30	(1)

Managerial career
- 1984: Sporting Peru
- 1985: Juventus
- 1986: Inter Miami
- 1987–1989: Miami Sharks
- 1989: Jorge Wilstermann
- 1998: Bolivia U-17 and U-20
- 1999: Bolivia U-17
- 2000: Club Atlético Pompleya
- 2001: Bolivian Regional U-17
- 2001: Club Primero de Mayo
- 2002: San José
- 2003: Brazilian Regional U-20
- 2005: Aurora
- 2006: La Paz
- 2008: Enrique Happ
- 2009: Oruro Royal
- 2010: Bata
- 2011: Enrique Happ
- * Club domestic league appearances and goals

Windsor Alfredo del Llano Suárez (born 17 August 1949) is a retired football forward who earned one cap with the U.S. national team in 1973 and another thirty with Bolivia between 1975 and 1981. He played professionally in both countries and currently coaches professional soccer in Bolivia.

== Professional ==
In 1974, del Llano spent a single season with the Washington Diplomats of the North American Soccer League. In 1975, he returned to Bolivia where he played for Club Jorge Wilstermann. He returned to the U.S. in 1976 where he played for the Tacoma Tides of the American Soccer League. In 1979, Del Llano was with the Bolivian club The Strongest. In 1988, he played for the Miami Sharks in the American Soccer League.

== National team ==
=== United States ===
Del Llano earned his single U.S. cap in a 1–0 loss to Poland on August 3, 1973. Del Llano, and most of his teammates, were from the second division American Soccer League after the first division North American Soccer League refused to release players for the game.

=== Bolivia ===
In 1975, del Llano was then called to the Bolivia national team, notwithstanding his already appearing with the U.S. He played thirty games, scoring one goal, from 1975 to 1981.

== Coaching ==
United States

1984

Coached and played for local amateur team Sporting Peru in Miami, Florida.

1985

He coached and played for local amateur team Juventus in Miami, Florida.

1986

Del Llano coached and founded local amateur team Inter Miami, in Florida.

1987–1989

He started as a player and finished as a coach of the Miami Sharks in the American Soccer League.

Bolivia

Del Llano has also coached at the professional level in Bolivia.

1989

In August he coached Club Jorge Wilstermann in the First Division Championship League.

1998

Coach of the Bolivia national team U-17 and U-20. Won Panamericano Championship in Ancud, Chile, undefeated with U-17 team.

1999

Del Llano took the U-17 national team to the South American U-17 Championship, in Rivera, Uruguay. Finishing third in their group.

He coached Club Aurora, and won the regional championship, qualifying for Copa Simón Bolívar.

2000

Coached Club Atlético Pompeya, of the first division professional league of Bolivia (LFPB).

2001

Del Llano coached the Regional U-17 All-Star Team of Beni, Bolivia, winning the Bolivia National U-17 Championship, that took place in Cochabamba, Bolivia.

He also coached club Primero de Mayo in 2001, a club from Trinidad, Beni, who won their first regional championship, and reached the final stage of Copa Simón Bolívar for a chance to promote to first division.

2002

Named coach of Club Deportivo San José of the first division professional league in Bolivia (LFPB).

2003

Coached Liga Mercosur All-Star Team U-20 Championship in Piracicaba, São Paulo, Brazil.

2005

Del Llano was Club Aurora's Technical Manager of the First Division Team and also General Director of the Youth Division.

2006

In 2006, Del Llano was the director and coach of La Paz F.C.

2008

He was coach of Enrique Happ winning the Regional Championship and qualifying for Copa Simón Bolívar

2009

Del Llano coached Club Oruro Royal in Copa Simón Bolívar Championship.

2010

Coached Club Deportivo Bata which won the Regional Championship after 31 years, and qualified for Copa Simón Bolívar.

2011

Del Llano coached Enrique Happ and qualified for Copa Simón Bolívar Championship.

== Career statistics ==
=== International ===
Appearances and goals by national team and year
National team	Year	Apps	Goals
Bolivia	1975	4	0
Bolivia	1976	–	
Bolivia	1977	7	0
Bolivia	1978	–	
Bolivia	1979	7	0
Bolivia	1980	5	1
Bolivia	1981	7	0
Total		30	1

Scores and results list Bolivia's goal tally first, score column indicates score after each del Llano goal.

List of international goals scored by Windsor del Llano
No.	Date	Venue	Opponent	Score	Result	Competition
1	30 November 1980	Hernando Siles Stadium, La Paz, Bolivia	Finland	3–0	3–0	Friendly
