= Tim Logush =

American soccer player (born 1952)

Personal information
- Full name: Tim Logush
- Date of birth: September 16, 1952 (age 74)
- Place of birth: Richmond Heights, Missouri, United States
- Position: Forward

Youth career
- 1971: St. Louis Kutis

College career
Years	Team	Apps	(Gls)
1971–1974	Saint Louis Billikens		

Senior career*
Years	Team	Apps	(Gls)
1975	Seattle Sounders	4	(0)
1975	St. Louis Kutis		
1977–1980	New Jersey Americans		
1981	Indianapolis Daredevils		

International career
1975	United States	1	(0)
- * Club domestic league appearances and goals

Tim Logush (born September 16, 1952, in Richmond Heights, Missouri is a retired U.S. soccer forward. He spent one season in the North American Soccer League and five in the American Soccer League, and earned one cap with the U.S. national team.

== High school and college ==
Logush grew up in a suburb of St. Louis, Missouri and attended Mercy High School, graduating in 1971. In 1971, he played for St. Louis Kutis S.C., winning the National Amateur Cup with them. He then entered St. Louis University where he played on the men's soccer team from 1971 to 1974. The Billikens won the 1972 and 1973 NCAA championships. He finished his collegiate career with twenty-four goals and twenty-two assists. He was inducted into the St. Louis Billikens Hall of Fame in 2007.

Logush was an important part of the Billikens' success in the early 1970s under head coach Harry Keough. His four-year playing career produced 70 points (24G, 22A), placing him 20th on SLU's prestigious all-time scoring list.

== Professional ==
The Seattle Sounders of the North American Soccer League (NASL) drafted Logush. He spent the 1975 season in Seattle, seeing time in only four games. He then returned to St. Louis where he played for St. Louis Kutis S.C. In 1977, he signed with the New Jersey Americans of the American Soccer League.

In 1980 he was contracted to play with ASL expansion team the Phoenix Fire, but the team folded in pre-season.

He finished his professional career in 1981 with the Indianapolis Daredevils.

== National team ==
Logush earned one cap with the U.S. national team in a 4–0 loss to Poland on June 24, 1975, when he came on for Randy Garber in the 40th minute.^{USA - Details of International Matches 1970-1979}

== Coaching ==
Following his retirement from playing professionally, Logush became a youth soccer coach in St. Louis.
