= Sam Boyd Stadium =

Football stadium

- Silver Bowl

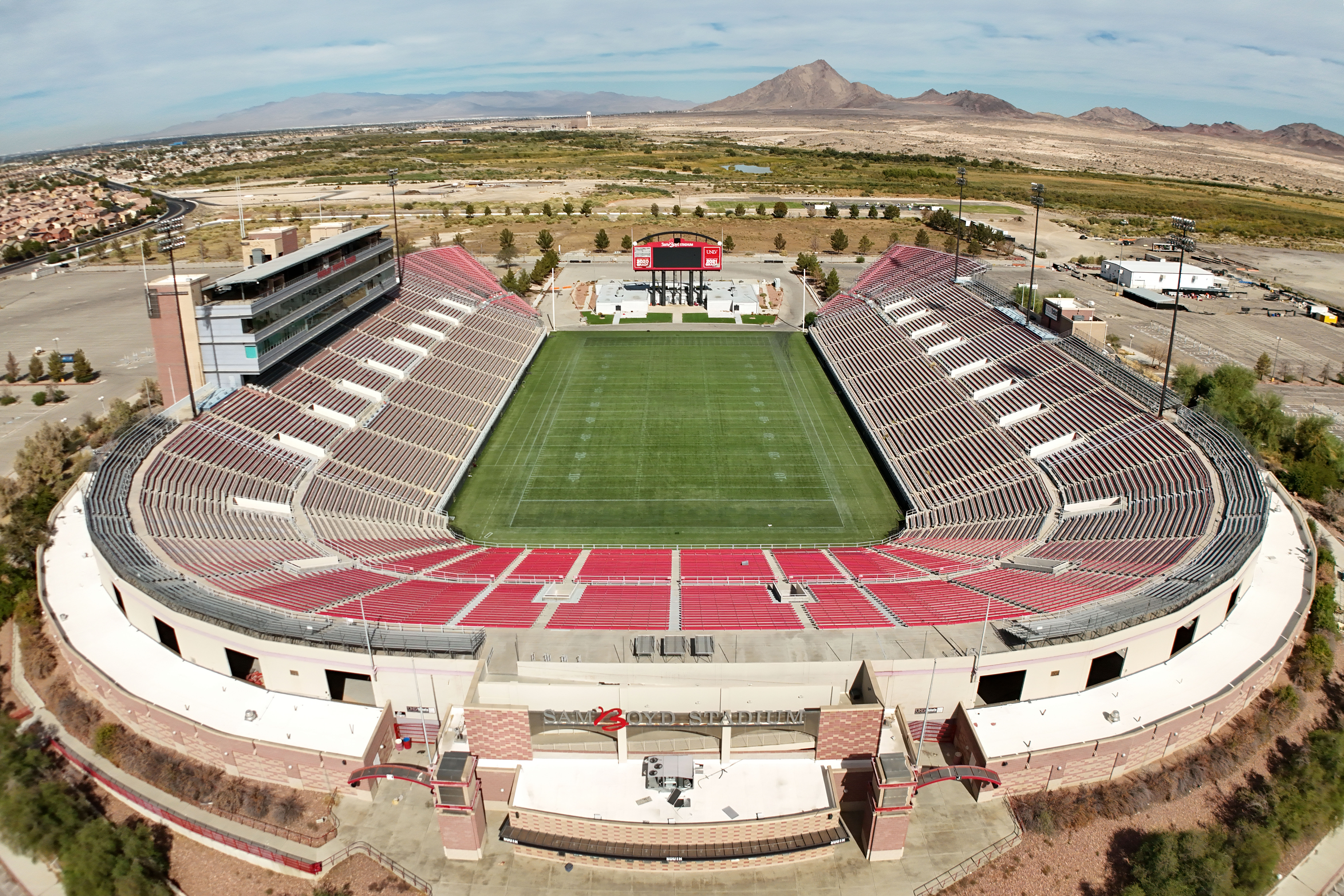
- Aerial view in 2024

- Location in Nevada Location in the United States Location in North America
- Interactive map of Sam Boyd Stadium
- Former names: Las Vegas Stadium (1971–1978); Las Vegas Silver Bowl (1978–1984); Sam Boyd Silver Bowl (1984–1994)
- Address: 7000 East Russell Road
- Location: Whitney, Nevada, U.S.
- Coordinates: 36.086°N 115.017°W
- Owner: Las Vegas Stadium Authority
- Operator: Las Vegas Stadium Authority
- Capacity: 36,800 (expandable to 40,000); 32,000 (1978–1998); 15,000 (1971–1977)
- Surface: Sprinturf (2015–present); Natural grass (Rugby 7s) (2010–2015); DURAPlay (2003–2015); Natural grass (1999–2002); AstroTurf (1971–1998)

Construction
- Groundbreaking: 1970; 56 years ago
- Opened: October 23, 1971; 55 years ago
- Renovated: 1999 and 2015
- Expanded: 1978 and 1999
- Closed: December 19, 2020; 5 years ago
- Cost: $3.5 million (2015 renovations: $1.2 million)
- Architect: Ellerbe Becket (renovations)

Tenants
- UNLV Rebels (NCAA) (1971–2019); Las Vegas Quicksilvers (NASL) (1977); Las Vegas Seagulls (ASL) (1979); Las Vegas Bowl (NCAA) (1992–2019); Las Vegas Posse (CFL) (1994); Las Vegas Outlaws (XFL) (2001); Las Vegas Locomotives (UFL) (2009–2012); USA Sevens (WR7S) (2010–2019); New Mexico Lobos (NCAA) (2020); San Jose State Spartans (NCAA) (2020)

Sam Boyd Stadium (formerly Las Vegas Stadium) is a closed football stadium in Whitney, Nevada, an unincorporated community in the Las Vegas Valley. It honors Sam Boyd (1910–1993), a major figure in the hotel and casino industry in Las Vegas. The stadium consisted of an uncovered horseshoe-shaped single-decked bowl, with temporary seating occasionally erected in the open north end zone. The artificial turf field had a conventional north–south orientation, at an elevation of 1,600 feet (490 m) above sea level.

It was the home field of the University of Nevada, Las Vegas (UNLV) Rebels for 49 seasons, from 1971 through 2019; they moved to Allegiant Stadium in 2020. The annual Las Vegas Bowl took place at Sam Boyd in December from 1992 through 2019, and also moved to Allegiant. Sam Boyd was also used for high school football championship games and at times regular-season high school games for Bishop Gorman High School.

A long time stop on the AMA Supercross Championship beginning in 1990, the final race of the season was located at the stadium every year. It also hosted the first 19 editions of the annual Monster Jam World Finals from 2000 to 2018.

From 2010 to 2019, it hosted the USA Sevens leg of the annual World Rugby Sevens Series in the sevens version of rugby union.

Several teams called the stadium home over the years, including the Las Vegas Quicksilvers of the North American Soccer League, the Las Vegas Posse of the Canadian Football League, the Las Vegas Outlaws of the original XFL and the Las Vegas Locomotives of the United Football League.

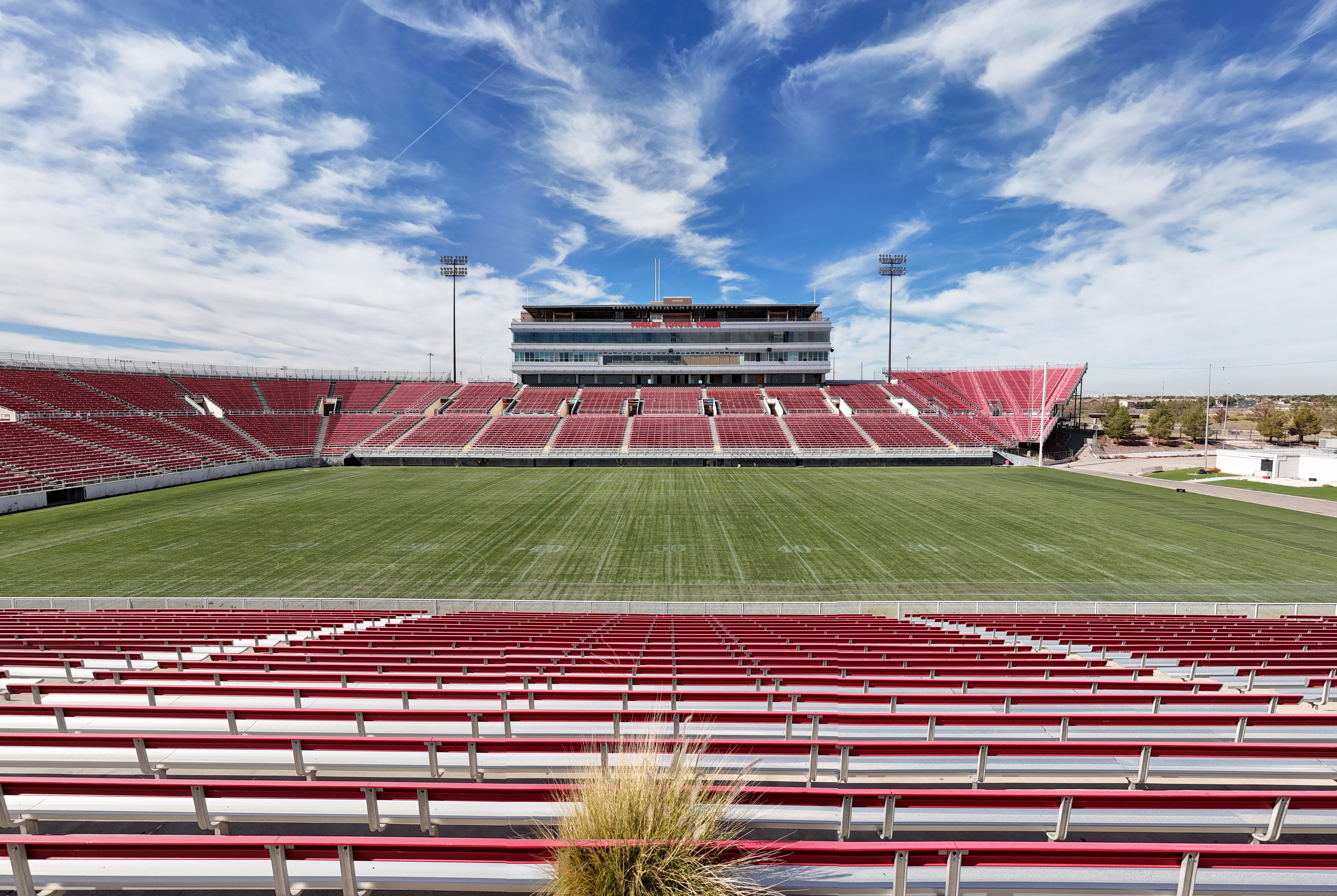
View from the east in 2024 after abandonment

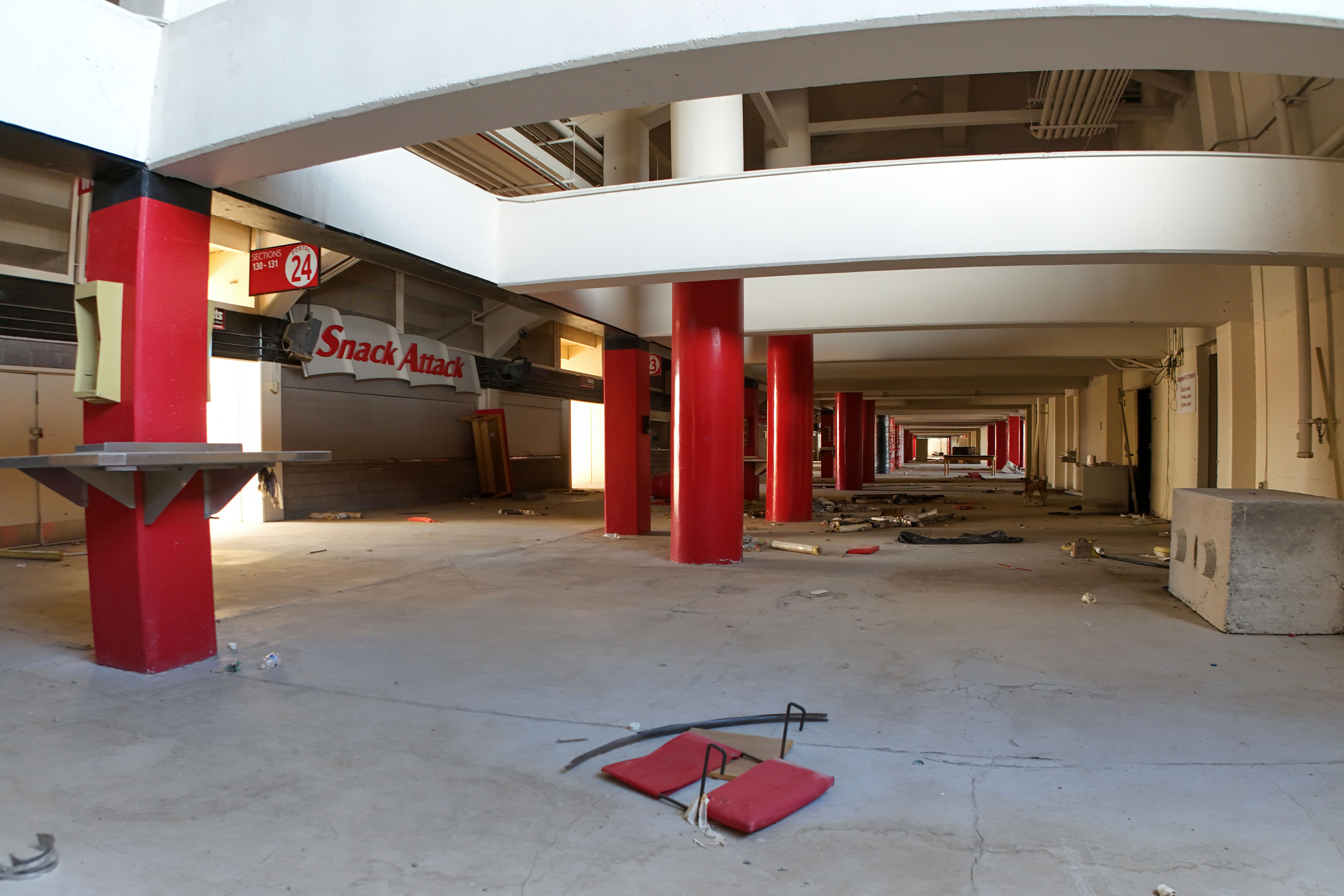
Concourse pictured after abandonment

== History ==
Built at a cost of $3.5 million, the stadium debuted on October 23, 1971; its dedication game was the following season's opener.

Originally known as Las Vegas Stadium, the name was changed to Las Vegas Silver Bowl in 1978, Sam Boyd Silver Bowl in 1984, and Sam Boyd Stadium on April 26, 1994. The original seating capacity was 15,000 through 1977, raised to 32,000 in 1978, and to 36,800 in 1999. Except from 1999 to 2002, the stadium has had an artificial turf surface. A $1.2 million renovation during the summer of 2015 replaced field turf that had not been changed out in more than a decade and was severely worn from usage. Additionally, two rows totaling 860 seats were removed from the east and west sidelines to widen the field and drop Sam Boyd's capacity to 35,500.

In 2011, UNLV began exploring building a new stadium to replace Sam Boyd Stadium.

In 2017, it was announced that the Oakland Raiders would relocate to Las Vegas, and a new stadium, Allegiant Stadium began construction. The UNLV Rebels joined the Raiders at the new stadium in 2020.

In 2016, Oakland Raiders owner Mark Davis had physically toured the stadium to assess the stadium as a possible temporary home if the team moved to Las Vegas. It was suggested that Sam Boyd Stadium could have served as a temporary home for the Raiders should fan support in Oakland fall to levels that could not reasonably be accommodated at the facility: the Los Angeles Chargers had come to a similar arrangement and played at the Dignity Health Sports Park, a stadium that is smaller than Sam Boyd Stadium, while in 1997, the Tennessee Oilers came to a similar arrangement in Memphis with Liberty Bowl Memorial Stadium and in Nashville with Vanderbilt Stadium after their new stadium had delays in its construction.

A fall in fan support in Oakland did not occur, and the Raiders later signed a stadium lease for 2018: after looking at their options, a 2019 lease with a 2020 option in Oakland meant Sam Boyd Stadium was not required. In any event, the stadium would have required renovation to meet the NFL's regulations to serve as a temporary home venue: since it would have been abandoned after the construction of Allegiant Stadium was completed, this would have been financially and logistically impractical.

On November 23, 2019, the Rebels defeated San Jose State 38–35 in their last game at the stadium. Four weeks later on December 21, the Washington Huskies defeated the Boise State Broncos 38–7 in the last Las Vegas Bowl held at the stadium.

The last scheduled non-football event of the 2019–2020 academic year was a Monster Jam show (which wasn't the World Finals as it had been moved to Camping World Stadium in 2019) on March 21–22: this event was postponed for several months due to the COVID-19 pandemic, and eventually was canceled.

A professional development football league called The Spring League held several exhibition games at Sam Boyd Stadium in March 2020. In July 2020, the league announced plans for a four-team fall season (which would make the league's name a misnomer) in October, 2020 with all games being held at Sam Boyd; however, the season was held at the San Antonio Alamodome instead.

Due to scheduling issues with the Raiders at Allegiant Stadium, UNLV moved its September 5, 2020 home game to Sam Boyd Stadium. That game was later canceled due to the COVID-19 pandemic.

UNLV's contract with Allegiant Stadium effectively prohibits the university from holding events at Sam Boyd Stadium in what is essentially a no-compete clause. In exchange for shutting down the stadium, UNLV receives annual compensation of up to $3.5 million over a 10-year period from the Raiders.

The exact future of the stadium remains up in the air, as UNLV officials are considering selling it, swapping it for a property closer to campus, demolishing it, or remodeling the stadium for secondary or high school use. After the opening of Allegiant Stadium, Sam Boyd Stadium was used for the 2021 UNLV commencement due to social distancing requirements rather than its usual indoor site, the Thomas & Mack Center. Clark County later purchased the stadium for $5 million, though no future plans have been announced.

== College football ==
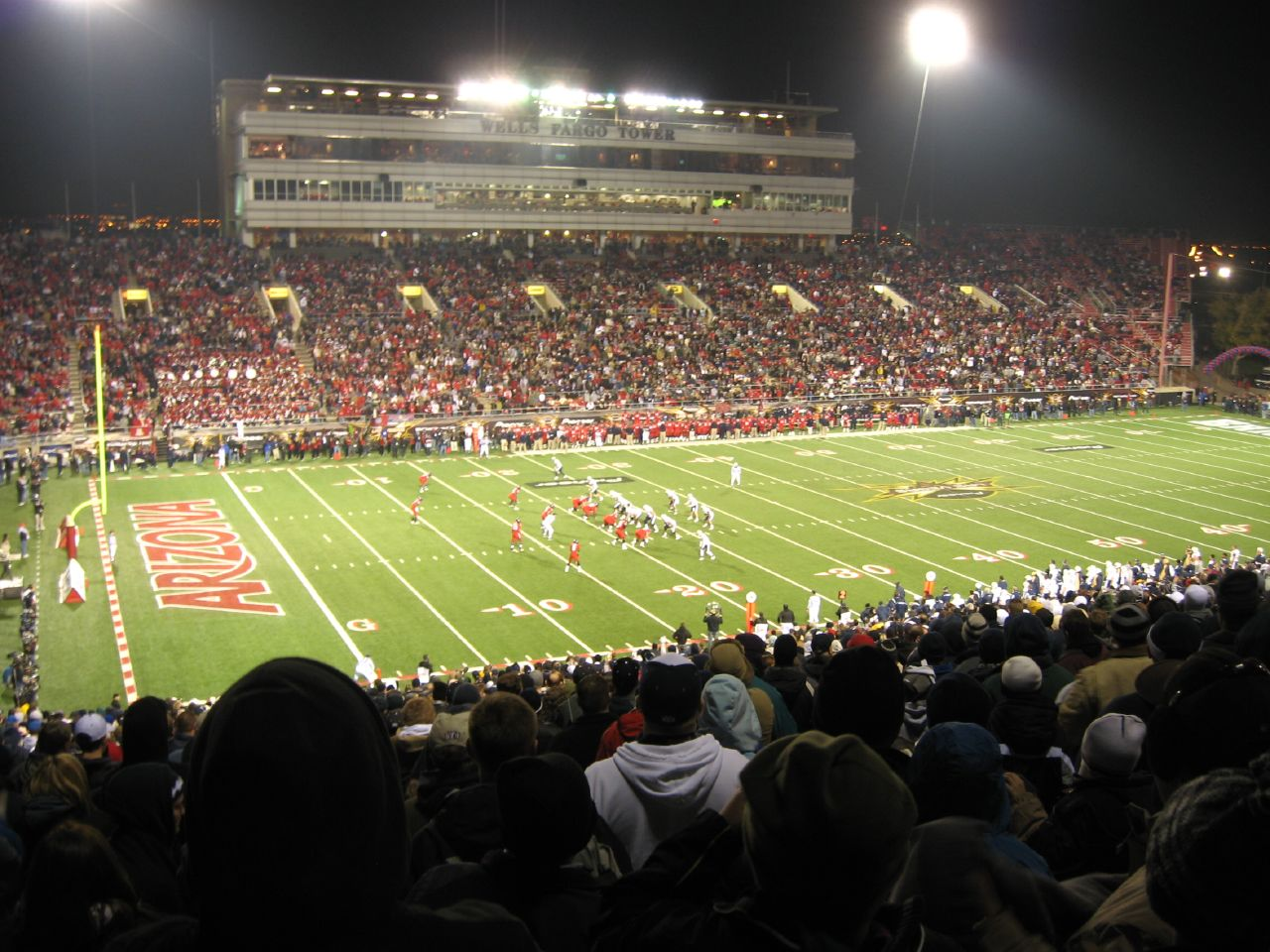
2008 Las Vegas Bowl

From 1992 through 2019, the stadium was the site of the annual Las Vegas Bowl. In the later years of the bowl game at the stadium, the game was very well attended. In 2005, Brigham Young University made its first postseason appearance since 2001 and excited BYU fans over-filled the stadium; the announced attendance was a record 40,053. The following season, BYU returned to the Las Vegas Bowl as a nationally ranked team. Additional seating was arranged at Sam Boyd Stadium for the 2006 game; the resulting attendance of 44,615 was the largest crowd to watch a team sports event in the history of the state of Nevada at that time. In 2007, BYU made its third straight appearance and attendance was 40,712. BYU made its fourth straight appearance 2008, ranked #16 in the nation and faced off against the Arizona Wildcats who made their first bowl appearance since 1998. Arizona won the contest, 31–21; 40,047 attended the game which featured David Hasselhoff singing the national anthem.

Sam Boyd Stadium was also the site of all three Western Athletic Conference title football games (1996–1998), and the Las Vegas All-American Classic postseason all-star game (2004–2006).

Due to restrictions set by their local governments in the wake of the COVID-19 pandemic, the New Mexico and San Jose State programs used the stadium as a temporary home field during the late stages of the 2020 season. The Spartans hosted the 2020 Mountain West Conference Football Championship Game against Boise State (which resulted in a 34-20 win for San Jose) in what is currently the stadium's final scheduled event and was announced to the media final sporting event in Sam Boyd Stadium history.

== Professional football ==
The stadium hosted the Las Vegas Posse of the Canadian Football League in 1994, the Las Vegas Outlaws of the original XFL in 2001 and the Las Vegas Locomotives of the United Football League from 2009 to 2011. On November 27, 2009, the Locomotives played the Florida Tuskers in the 2009 UFL Championship Game at Boyd, which the Locos won 20–17 in overtime. Sam Boyd Stadium was originally announced as the host for the 2019 and 2020 Alliance of American Football championship games, but the former was moved to Ford Center at The Star in Frisco, Texas and the league later folded halfway through its 2019 season. The stadium also hosted The Spring League games in 2020.

== Soccer ==
Following the 1976 season of the North American Soccer League, the San Diego Jaws decided to relocate and become the Las Vegas Quicksilvers. Despite a roster featuring international superstar Eusébio, the Quicksilvers could only manage an 11–15 record and a 5th-place finish in their division. They averaged an attendance of 7,092 per game. When the 1977 season ended, the franchise opted to move back to San Diego after only one year and became the San Diego Sockers. They were followed by the Las Vegas Seagulls, who played in the American Soccer League. They compiled a record of 7–18–3 in their only season in 1979.

In 1999, the stadium hosted the CONCACAF Champions Cup tournament, which determined the continental champion of North and Central America. The stadium also hosted several Major League Soccer preseason exhibition matches. Spanish superclub Real Madrid defeated Mexico's Santos Laguna 2–1 in a friendly match played on a temporary grass pitch in Sam Boyd Stadium in 2012. The paid attendance was 29,152, which made it the highest attended soccer match in Nevada history.

Sam Boyd Stadium hosted the inaugural Leagues Cup final between clubs of Major League Soccer and Liga MX on September 18, 2019. Cruz Azul won the final, defeating UANL 2–1.

=== Finals ===
Year	Winners	Result	Runners-up	Venue	Attendance
2019	Cruz Azul (Mexico)	2–1	(Mexico) UANL	Sam Boyd Stadium, Whitney, Nevada	20,132

== USA Sevens rugby ==
The stadium hosted the USA Sevens rugby tournament every year from 2010 to 2019. The USA Sevens was the largest rugby tournament in North America, drawing over 60,000 fans in 2012. The tournament brought together over 15 national teams from six continents in rugby sevens as part of the World Rugby Sevens Series. The USA Sevens debuted in 2004 in Los Angeles and moved to San Diego in 2007. A temporary grass pitch was installed for the event each year through 2015. The March 2016 event was played on the artificial surface.

== Other events ==
In 2010, Sam Boyd Stadium became the host of the Clark County High School Football Coaches Hall of Fame, including a 22 feet by 12 feet wall wrap with vintage photos of the inductees that will be displayed in the Southwest concourse of the stadium.

From 1990 until 2019, the final round of the AMA Supercross Championship was held at the venue. The final race at the stadium in 2020 will be the second to final round. Most of the track is located inside the stadium with extensions taken into the area behind the score board. This event also includes the Davey Coombs Sr. East/West Shootout which was first won by Kevin Windham in 1997. From 2011 until 2019, the Monster Energy Cup was held at the venue. Ryan Villopoto won the inaugural 2011 event as did Marvin Musquin in the 2017 event and Eli Tomac in 2018 event. Adam Cianciarulo won the final event at the stadium in 2019.

From 2000 until 2018, Sam Boyd Stadium hosted the Monster Jam World Finals in late March every year; the annual event has changed to rotating venues each year. The venue also hosted the inaugural Monster Jam All-Star Challenge from October 11–12, 2019.

During the 1990s, The Grateful Dead played 14 shows at the stadium. The stadium and grounds hosted the two-day Vegoose music festival from 2005 to 2007.

In April 2018, the Las Vegas Horse Polo Classic was held at the stadium.

In February 2020, five Major League Rugby matches were played at the stadium over 2 weekends.

U2 played at the stadium multiple times, including during their ZooTV Tour on November 12, 1992, for the opening night of Popmart Tour on April 25, 1997 and during the 360º Tour on October 23, 2009 in front of 42,213 fans.

== See also ==
- List of NCAA Division I FBS football stadiums

Events and tenants
Preceded by Butcher Field	Home of the UNLV Rebels football 1971–2019	Succeeded by Allegiant Stadium
Preceded by Bulldog Stadium (California Bowl)	Host of the Las Vegas Bowl; 1992–2019	Succeeded by Allegiant Stadium
