= Bruce Arena =

American soccer coach (born 1951)

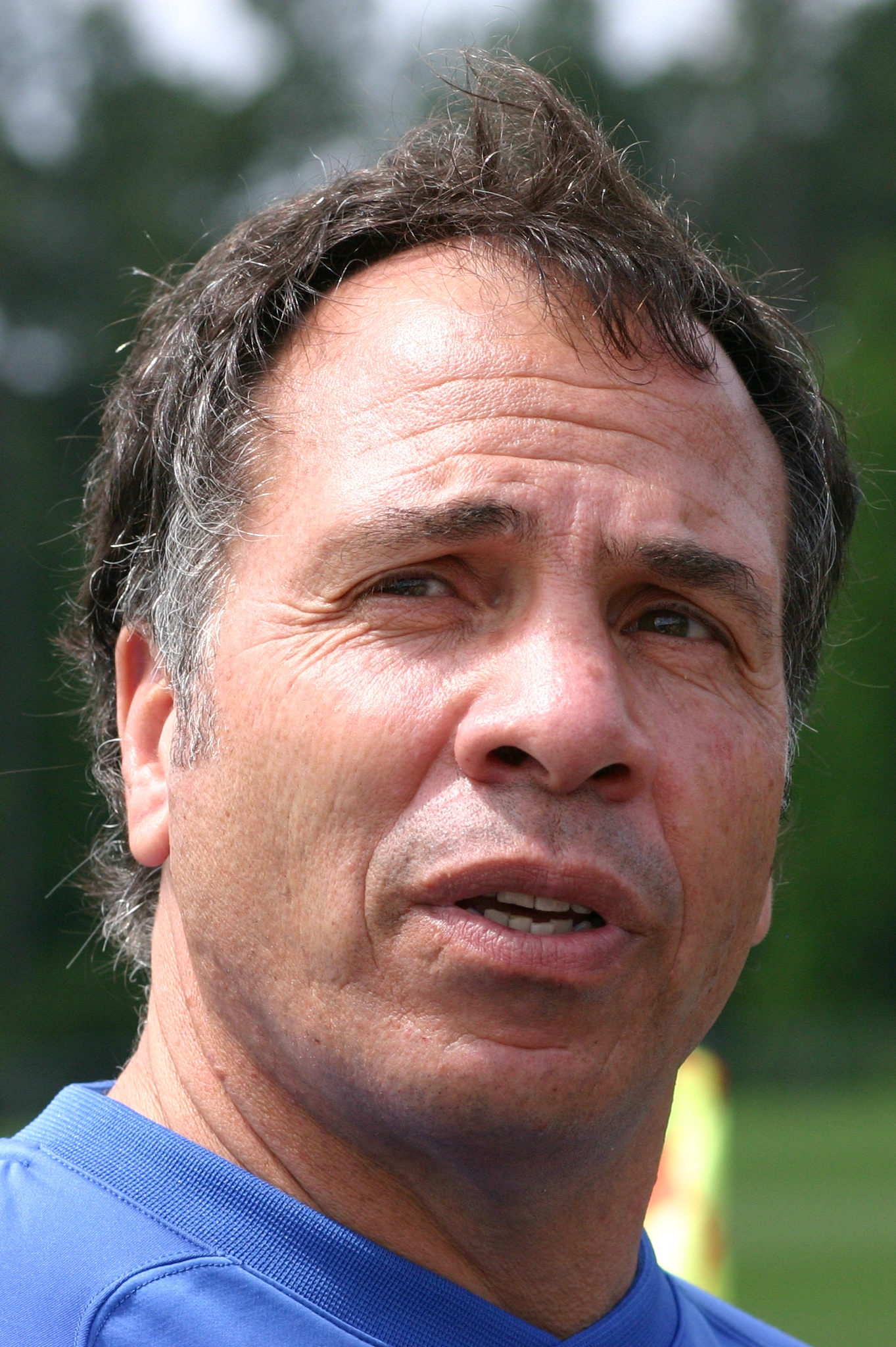
- Arena in 2006

Personal information
- Date of birth: September 21, 1951 (age 75)
- Place of birth: Brooklyn, New York, United States
- Height: 6 ft 0 in (1.83 m)
- Position: Goalkeeper

Team information
- Current team: San Jose Earthquakes (manager and sporting director)

Youth career
- 1968: New York Hota

College career
Years	Team	Apps	(Gls)
1969–1971	Nassau Lions		
1971–1973	Cornell Big Red		

Senior career*
Years	Team	Apps	(Gls)
1976	Tacoma Tides		

International career
1973	United States	1	(0)

Managerial career
- 1973: Cornell Big Red (assistant)
- 1976: Puget Sound Loggers
- 1977: Cornell Big Red (lacrosse assistant)
- 1978–1985: Virginia Cavaliers (lacrosse assistant)
- 1978–1995: Virginia Cavaliers (soccer)
- 1996: United States U-23
- 1996–1998: D.C. United
- 1998–2006: United States
- 2006–2007: New York Red Bulls
- 2008–2016: LA Galaxy
- 2016–2017: United States
- 2019–2023: New England Revolution
- 2024–: San Jose Earthquakes
Medal record
Men's soccer
Representing United States (as manager)
FIFA Confederations Cup
Bronze medal – third place	1999
CONCACAF Gold Cup
Winner	2002
Bronze medal – third place	2003
Winner	2005
Winner	2017
- * Club domestic league appearances and goals

Bruce Arena (born September 21, 1951) is an American soccer coach who currently serves as the head coach and sporting director of the San Jose Earthquakes.

He is a member of the National Soccer Hall of Fame and the NJCAA Lacrosse Hall of Fame. Arena has had a long and distinguished coaching career and is considered to be one of the most successful coaches in North American soccer history, having won five College Cup titles and five MLS Cup titles. He was the United States national team head coach at the 1996 Summer Olympics, the 2002 FIFA World Cup and the 2006 FIFA World Cup, head coach of the New York Red Bulls, D.C. United, LA Galaxy, and the New England Revolution in Major League Soccer, and coached Virginia Cavaliers men's soccer to several college soccer championships. He is the U.S. soccer team's longest-serving head coach with the highest number of wins, and the only coach to lead the team to two World Cups.

Before beginning his coaching career, Arena was a goalkeeper for Cornell University, and earned one cap with the United States men's national soccer team.

== Playing career ==
=== High school and college ===
Arena was born in Brooklyn, New York to Vincent and Adeline Arena, Italian immigrants (from Alicudi, Sicily). He grew up in the Long Island town of Franklin Square, New York, where he attended Carey High School. His father was a butcher while his mother was a school bus driver. Adeline was diagnosed with breast cancer when Bruce Arena was a child and had to undergo a mastectomy.

While he excelled at several sports, he was too small for American football, so he joined his high school's soccer team as a defender. He moved into the goal when the starting goalkeeper was suspended after hitting another school's player during a game. While in high school, he also played a single season with local club Hota S.C. of New York City's Cosmopolitan Soccer League.

After graduation, he began his collegiate athletic career playing both lacrosse and soccer at Nassau Community College, a two-year college near his home. Arena was a 1970 and 1971 Honorable Mention All-American lacrosse player and an All-American soccer player. He was inducted into the National Junior College Hall of Fame in 2008. While at Nassau, he played soccer for head coach Bill Stevenson and goalkeeper coach Shep Messing, a future New York Cosmos goalkeeper. At the end of his two years with Nassau, Arena transferred to Cornell University in upstate New York where he was a 1972 Honorable Mention All American, All-Ivy first team selection and a 1973 Second Team All American in lacrosse. He did not originally intend to play soccer, but injuries to the school's first and second string goalkeepers led the men's soccer coach, Dan Wood, to recruit Arena into the team as its goalkeeper. Arena backstopped the Cornell Big Red soccer team to the 1972 NCAA Soccer Championship Final Four and earned Most Valuable Defensive Player honours for the tournament.

=== Professional ===
After Arena's graduation from Cornell, New York Cosmos drafted him in the fifth round of the North American Soccer League college draft. The Cosmos released him before the season. Arena then signed to play professional lacrosse for the Montreal Quebecois, spending a single season with the team in 1975. The National Lacrosse League folded at the end of the 1975 season, leaving Arena unemployed. At the same time, Dan Wood, who had recruited Arena to play for the Cornell soccer team, had been named the new head coach of the expansion Tacoma Tides which played in the American Soccer League. Wood contacted Arena and convinced him to move to the Pacific Northwest in 1976 to play for him. While Arena was the second string goalkeeper behind starter Jamil Canal, the move to Tacoma was significant in that it introduced Arena to coaching. That year, in addition to playing for the Tides, Arena coached the men's soccer team at the University of Puget Sound, where he compiled a 5–7 record.

=== International ===
In 1973, he earned his only national team cap as a second-half substitute for Bob Rigby in a 2–0 loss to Israel. National team coach, Gordon Bradley, had called Arena into the national team for an earlier game against Haiti, but Arena could not get time off from his job teaching at a local junior high school. In addition to his single cap with the U.S. soccer team, Arena also played for the national lacrosse team which won the 1974 World Lacrosse Championship and finished runner up in 1978.

== Coaching career ==
=== College ===
In 1977, Arena moved back to Ithaca to teach at Cornell and act as the school's assistant lacrosse coach. While he was there, the University of Virginia (UVA) advertised for two open coaching positions – head soccer coach and assistant lacrosse coach beginning the 1978 season. Arena took that opportunity and went on to coach both the UVA lacrosse and soccer teams for seven years, before becoming the school's dedicated soccer coach in 1985. Arena was the head coach of the Virginia program for eighteen years, during which he won five national championships (including 4 straight from 1991 to 1994) and amassed a 295–58–32 record, for a career NCAA mark of 300–65–32. Additionally, he coached and developed many players at Virginia who would go on to play significant roles in the United States national team, including Claudio Reyna, Jeff Agoos, Ben Olsen, John Harkes and Tony Meola. Arena also coached Richie Williams who later became his assistant coach with the US national team and the New England Revolution. During his tenure at UVA he was also a record seven-time ACC coach of the year. In addition to coaching, Arena served as the ACC soccer coaches chairman as well as two three-year terms on the NCAA Division I soccer committee from 1989 to 1995.

=== D.C. United ===
On January 3, 1996, Arena left UVA to become the coach of D.C. United of Major League Soccer. The 1996 season would be both the team's and the league's inaugural season, so Arena needed to build a team from scratch just like the other 9 MLS club managers. To make his position even more difficult, he had agreed to coach the U.S. U-23 national team at the 1996 Summer Olympics in Atlanta, where it went a disappointing 1–1–1. Despite the underperformance at the Olympics, Arena managed to form his team and lead United to an improbable comeback victory in the first MLS Cup at Foxboro Stadium. In addition to the MLS title, Arena also took United to the 1996 U.S. Open Cup championship. Arena and United continued to experience success in 1997. The heavily favored team won its second MLS Cup at RFK Stadium defeating the surprise Western Conference champion Colorado Rapids 2–1. Arena's success led to his selection as the 1997 MLS Coach of the Year. This year, Arena took United to the semi-finals of the CONCACAF Champions' Cup. In 1998, Arena took United to its third consecutive MLS Cup only to see his team fall to the expansion Chicago Fire led by his protégé Bob Bradley. However, while Arena failed to add another MLS championship to his resume, he guided United to the CONCACAF Champions' Cup title with a 1–0 victory over Toluca on August 16, 1998. He followed that with a defeat of Brazilian club Vasco da Gama to take the Interamerican Cup title. Arena was also the 1997 and 1998 MLS All-Star head coach.

=== National team ===
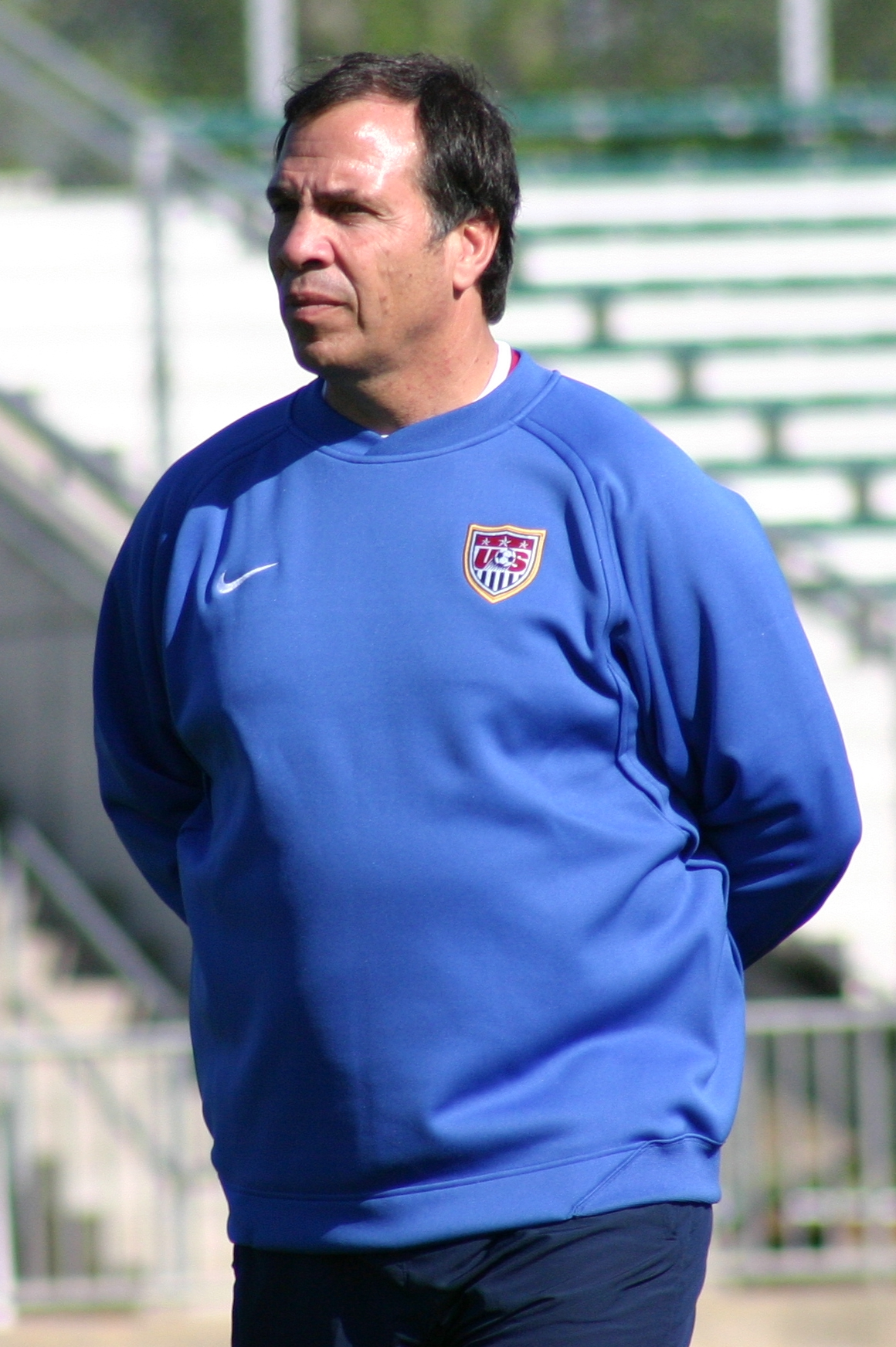
Arena during USMNT practice in 2006

Arena was hired by the U.S. national team to replace Steve Sampson as head coach in October 1998 following the team's disastrous showing in the 1998 FIFA World Cup. His first game in charge was a friendly against Australia in San Jose, California, on November 6, 1998. He then forged the team into a successful international side, and is the most successful coach in United States history: most international wins; longest home shut-out; best World Cup showing since 1930, reaching the quarterfinals at the 2002 World Cup, before a defeat against Germany; and all-time best international FIFA Ranking (4th place, April 2006). Arena also won two Gold Cup championships in 2002 and 2005, with a third-place finish in 2003.

The 2002 World Cup was the high point of Arena's career as the U.S. coach. Heavy underdogs coming into the tournament, they stunned the world by beating a respected Portuguese team 3–2 in their opening game. Arena was lauded afterward for instilling in his players the confidence to play aggressively against an international powerhouse. A hard-fought tie against host nation South Korea was enough to qualify for the second round, despite a poor loss against Poland in the final group game. Arena and the U.S. met old nemesis Mexico in the Round of 16, and Arena adapted his tactics to secure a 2–0 victory and a quarterfinal berth. The U.S. switched from their usual 4–4–2 to a 3–5–2, and it paid dividends almost immediately when Josh Wolff, who Arena had brought in to fill out the formation, set up Brian McBride for the winning goal early in the first half. Arena switched the team back to a 4–4–2 for their quarterfinal against Germany, and the team continued to surprise many by dominating stretches of the game. However, they lost 1–0 on a Michael Ballack header, and there was a controversy with a penalty not awarded to the U.S. for a handball in the German penalty box.

The U.S. national squad fell short of expectations at the 2006 FIFA World Cup, finishing last in Group E with losses to the Czech Republic and Ghana. The United States scored only twice in its three games, a tie against eventual champion Italy on an own goal by Italian Cristian Zaccardo and a goal from Clint Dempsey against Ghana. Some, including former team member and ESPN analyst Eric Wynalda, have blamed the poor performance on questionable coaching decisions by Arena, including not playing Clint Dempsey and putting DaMarcus Beasley on the right wing instead of his favored left against the Czechs, and using a defensive 4–5–1 in the must-win match vs. Ghana which the U.S. eventually lost. Another questionable decision was made when Claudio Reyna became injured after the first goal when Arena subbed in defensive midfielder Ben Olsen to replace Reyna.

During his time as national team head coach, the United States rose in the FIFA world rankings from nineteenth to fourth, to the surprise, even, of U.S. players. Arena's 75 wins from 1998 to 2006 are by far the most in U.S. history. Nevertheless, three weeks after the Americans' disappointing first-round exit from the World Cup in Germany, the U.S. Soccer Federation announced that Arena's contract would not be renewed when it expired at the end of 2006. U.S. Soccer Federation president Sunil Gulati explained Arena's dismissal, stating that the U.S. was seeking a "fresh approach."

Arena was eventually replaced as national team coach by his close friend and former assistant at Virginia and D.C. United, Bob Bradley. During his time coaching the national team, Arena had 81 wins, the highest number of any coach in the team's history.

=== New York Red Bulls ===
After the US. national team, Arena pursued other coaching opportunities. That led to his being hired by Major League Soccer team New York Red Bulls. Arena's first match with the club came on August 12, 2006, in a friendly against FC Barcelona. On November 5, 2007, Red Bulls and Arena decided mutually to part company. During his year-and-a-half with the club, he went 16–16–10. He had two years remaining on his contract with the club.

=== Los Angeles Galaxy ===
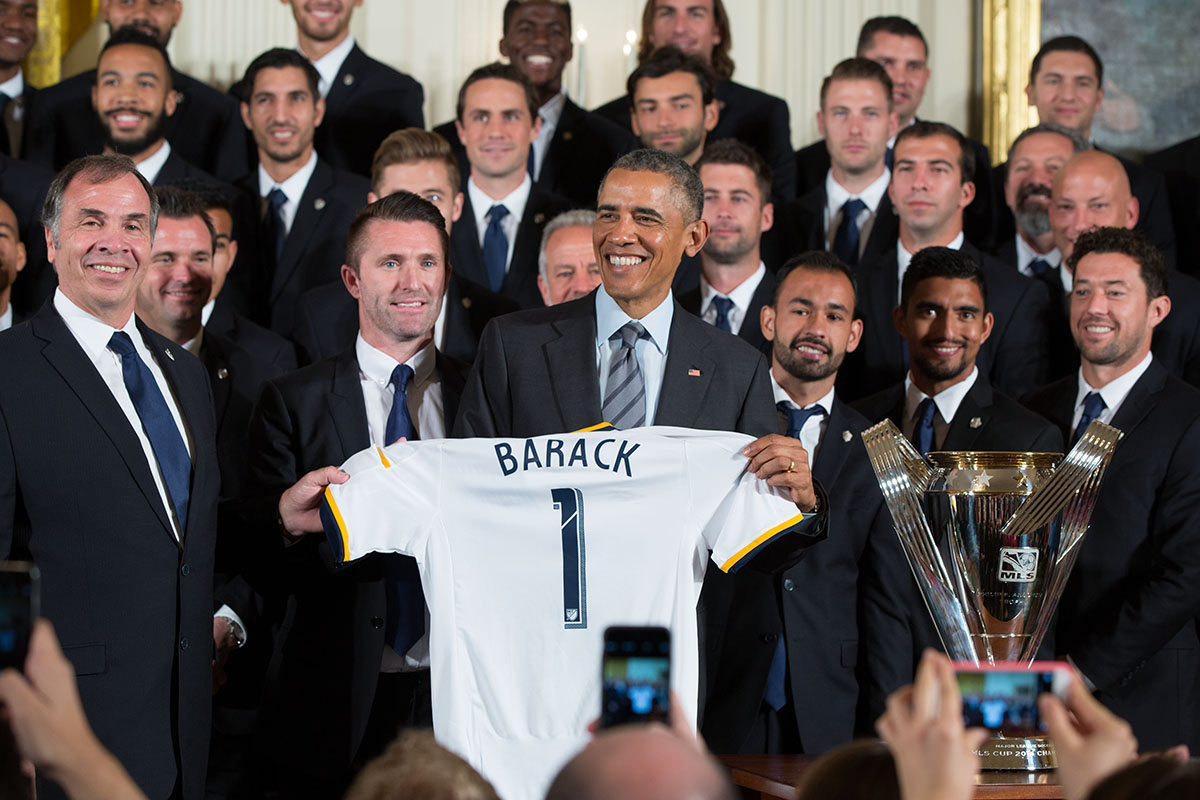
Arena (on the left) during the LA Galaxy’s White House visit in 2015

On August 18, 2008, Los Angeles Galaxy hired Arena to replace Ruud Gullit as head coach and Alexi Lalas as general manager. He inherited a team that had failed to make the playoffs since 2005 and would finish the 2008 season at 8–13–9, finishing next-to-last in the league and letting in a league-high 62 goals. During the offseason, Arena reshaped the defense, drafting Omar Gonzalez and A. J. DeLaGarza who became fixtures on the backline and bringing in Donovan Ricketts as the goalkeeper. Although the team scored only 36 goals in 2009, they also let in only 31. This led to a 12–6–12 record and second-place finish in the league standings. The Galaxy went to the playoffs and Arena was selected as the MLS Coach of the Year Award.

The 2011 Major League Soccer season went extremely well for Bruce's Galaxy. His club won the Supporters' Shield for the second straight season, became only the third team in league history to reach the 60-point plateau, and won the 2011 MLS Cup in a 1–0 victory over the Houston Dynamo. Los Angeles also advanced to the elimination round of the CONCACAF Champions League. The Galaxy was, however, eliminated from the U.S. Open Cup in the quarterfinal stage. The club was undefeated in competitive matches at the Home Depot Center in 2011.

The 2012 Galaxy repeated winning the championship, again over Houston, despite a slow start to the year finishing with a 16-9-3 record. In 2013, Arena led the Galaxy to a 15-11-8 record, they were defeated eliminated by Real Salt Lake the Conference Semifinals. That year the team reached the semifinals of the 2012–13 CONCACAF Champions League, where they were knocked out by Monterrey. In 2014, he led the Galaxy to the second best record in the MLS with a 17-7-10 record. During the postseason he won a third championship with the Galaxy in over the New England Revolution.

=== Return to the national team ===
On November 22, 2016, Arena was appointed as coach of the United States national team for the second time, replacing Jürgen Klinsmann after two disastrous losses in the first two matches of Hex qualifying round for the 2018 World Cup. On March 25, 2017, Arena led the USMNT to a trouncing 6–0 win over Honduras, followed by a 1–1 draw with Panama. On June 9, Arena led the USMNT to an important 2–0 win in a qualifying match against Trinidad and Tobago, followed by the USMNT's 3rd ever WCQ draw at Estadio Azteca against Mexico. The team had a 14-match unbeaten streak leading up to the Gold Cup, the best streak in the team's history. During a pause in World Cup Qualification, Arena's squad won the 2017 CONCACAF Gold Cup with a 2–1 win over Jamaica in the Finals. Arena's team returned to World Cup Qualification and lost 2–0 to Costa Rica on September 1. The US team bounced back with an impressive 4–0 rout of Panama on October 6 to get back into the qualifying third-place spot during the fifth round.

On October 10, the final day of qualification, the USMNT needed a draw against Trinidad and Tobago to qualify for the 2018 FIFA World Cup in Russia. The U.S. were heavy favorites coming in as Trinidad and Tobago had lost six straight games, but the team fell into a 0–2 hole with an Omar Gonzalez own-goal and an Alvin Jones goal. While Christian Pulisic pulled one back, the U.S. could not score again and lost to Trinidad and Tobago 1–2. With this loss, along with both Panama and Honduras beating their opponents, the U.S. fell to fifth place in the CONCACAF region's final qualifying round and failed to qualify for the FIFA World Cup for the first time since 1986. Three days after the team's failure to qualify, Arena resigned from his position as men's national team head coach. He said, "We have no excuses, we failed today. We should have walked off this field with at least a point."

=== New England Revolution ===
Following his resignation from the national team, Arena was floated as a potential candidate for several coaching and managing positions, including for the Columbus Crew and the Scotland national team.

He was named the head coach and sporting director of the New England Revolution on May 14, 2019, replacing Brad Friedel. His first game in charge came on June 2, in a 2–1 win over his former team, LA Galaxy.

Under Arena, the Revolution, who were at that point in last place in the Eastern Conference, went eleven games undefeated until losing 2–0 to Los Angeles FC on August 3, 2019. Following that defeat, the Revolution closed out the season only losing two more matches on a 2-2-6 run, and qualifying for the playoffs for the first time since 2015. The Revolution were eliminated in the first round of the 2019 MLS Cup Playoffs by defending 2018 MLS Cup champion Atlanta United 1-0.

The following season, Arena's Revolution advanced to the Eastern Conference Final of the 2020 MLS Cup Playoffs. It was the first time the Revolution had made it to the Eastern Conference Final since 2014. They would ultimately lose the game to the eventual MLS Cup 2020 champion Columbus Crew 1-0.

In the 2021 season, Arena led the Revolution to their first-ever Supporters' Shield by having the best regular season record in the league. Additionally that season, the team set a record for most points in a regular season, with 73. Arena was named MLS Coach of the Year for a league-record fourth time at the end of the season. Despite the strong regular season, the Revolution were eliminated in penalties in the 2021 MLS Cup Playoffs Conference semifinals by eventual champion New York City FC.

After a transfer and injury-hampered 2022 campaign, Arena's Revolution returned to form in 2023, compiling a record of 12 wins, 7 draws, and 4 losses, sitting in second place in the Eastern Conference, when regular season play paused for the 2023 Leagues Cup.

On August 1, 2023, Arena was placed on administrative leave by the Revolution amid allegations of "insensitive and inappropriate remarks."

On September 9, 2023, Arena resigned as head coach and sporting director of the Revolution.

=== San Jose Earthquakes ===
On November 7, 2024, Arena was announced as the new head coach and sporting director of the San Jose Earthquakes. Arena's first win as Earthquakes manager came in the club's 2025 season opener on February 22, a 4-0 result over Real Salt Lake.

== Personal life ==
Arena has resided in the Los Angeles area with his wife Phyllis since taking over as LA Galaxy head coach, having previously been based out of Charlottesville, Virginia, during most of his coaching career.

He has a brother, Michael, and a son, Kenny Arena, who played with the U.S. youth national team and in Major League Soccer before becoming a coach. He is a grandparent through Kenny Arena.

== Coaching record ==
As of 7 November 2026

Team	From	To	Record^{1}				
Team	From	To	G	W	D	L	Win %
D.C. United	January 3, 1996	December 6, 1998	128	71	28	29	55.47
United States	October 26, 1998	July 14, 2006	130	71	29	30	54.62
New York Red Bulls	July 18, 2006	November 5, 2007	52	19	13	20	36.54
LA Galaxy	August 18, 2008	November 22, 2016	348	166	89	93	47.70
United States	November 22, 2016	October 13, 2017	18	10	6	2	55.56
New England Revolution	June 1, 2019	September 9, 2023	156	71	48	37	45.51
San Jose Earthquakes	November 7, 2024	present	74	29	19	26	39.19
Total			906	437	232	237	48.23

- 1.Record includes league, cup, playoffs and CONCACAF competitions. During his tenure as D.C. United head coach, all shootout wins were put into their own separate column and all shootout losses were put under the loss column. During his tenure as United States head coach, matches that end in a shootout are considered ties.

== Honors ==
=== As a coach ===
D.C. United

- MLS Cup (2): 1996, 1997
- MLS Supporters' Shield: 1997
- MLS Eastern Conference (3): 1996, 1997, 1998
- U.S. Open Cup: 1996
- CONCACAF Champions' Cup: 1998
- Interamerican Cup: 1998

LA Galaxy

- MLS Cup (3): 2011, 2012, 2014
- MLS Supporters' Shield (2): 2010, 2011
- MLS Western Conference (4): 2009, 2011, 2012, 2014

New England Revolution

- MLS Supporters' Shield (1): 2021

University of Virginia

- College Cup (5): 1989, 1991, 1992, 1993, 1994
- ACC Men's Soccer Tournament (6): 1988, 1991, 1992, 1993, 1994, 1995
- ACC Men’s Regular Season: (11) 1979, 1984, 1986, 1987, 1988, 1989, 1990, 1991, 1992, 1995, 1996,

United States

- CONCACAF Gold Cup (3): 2002, 2005, 2017

Individual

- ACC Coach of the Year (7): 1979, 1984, 1986, 1988, 1989, 1991, 1995
- MLS Coach of the Year (4): 1997, 2009, 2011, 2021
- National Soccer Hall of Fame: Class of 2010
- United Soccer Coaches Hall of Fame: 2018

=== As a player ===
Individual

- Second Team All-American (lacrosse): 1973
- Cornell University Athletic’s Hall of Fame: Class of 1986
- NJCAA Lacrosse Hall of Fame: Class of 2008
- National Junior College Hall of Fame: Class of 2008
- Nassau Community College Athletics Hall of Fame: Class of 2010

== See also ==
- National team managers with 100 or more matches
- List of Major League Soccer coaches
