= Vic Davidson =

Scottish footballer

Personal information
- Full name: Victor Salvatore Ferla Davidson
- Date of birth: 8 November 1950 (age 75)
- Place of birth: Glasgow, Scotland
- Height: 1.75 m (5 ft 9 in)
- Position: Midfielder

Youth career
- Glasgow United
- 1967–1970: Celtic

Senior career*
Years	Team	Apps	(Gls)
1970–1975	Celtic	22	(14)
1975–1978	Motherwell	95	(19)
1978–1979	Blackpool	25	(3)
1979–1980	Celtic	17	(3)
1980–1982	Phoenix Inferno (indoor)	36	(58)
1982–1984	Cleveland Force (indoor)	100	(79)
1984–1985	Canton Invaders (indoor)	?	(?)
- * Club domestic league appearances and goals

Victor Salvatore Ferla Davidson (born 8 November 1950) is a Scottish retired professional footballer. He played in midfield.

Glasgow-born Davidson grew up in Calton and Bridgeton. He attended school at Sacred Heart R.C., where he played in the same football team as future musician Frankie Miller. In 1967, he signed as a schoolboy player with Celtic and was given his first-team debut in 1970. He played only sporadically over the next five years before being transferred to Motherwell in 1975. After three seasons with the Well, he signed for English club Blackpool. In March 1979, Celtic bought Davidson from Blackpool for £35,000. The following year, he moved to the United States, where he signed with the Phoenix Inferno of the Major Indoor Soccer League. He finished the season ranked third in goals. In 1982, he moved to the Cleveland Force. Davidson was slowed by a leg injury during the 1983–84 season and the Force released him at the end of the season. After no other MISL teams expressed an interest in him, he signed with the Canton Invaders of the American Indoor Soccer Association. That year, the Invaders won the league title.

Since he retired, Davidson has been coaching at the Scottsdale Soccer Club in Arizona.

== See also ==
- List of Cleveland Force (1978-1988) players
