= Mal Roche =

English footballer

Personal information
- Place of birth: Coventry, England
- Position: Forward

College career
Years	Team	Apps	(Gls)
1973–1974	Brockport Golden Eagles	14	(17)
1975–1976	San Francisco Dons		

Senior career*
Years	Team	Apps	(Gls)
1977	Sacramento Spirits	22	(13)
1978–1979	Los Angeles Skyhawks		
1980	Golden Gate Gales	27	(17)
1980–1981	St. Louis Steamers (indoor)	5	(2)
1981–1983	Carolina Lightnin'	22	(8)
1983–1984	St. Louis Steamers (indoor)		
1984	San Francisco Glens		
- * Club domestic league appearances and goals

Mal Roche (born in Coventry) is an English retired football forward who played seven seasons in the American Soccer League and at least one in the Major Indoor Soccer League. He was the 1977 ASL Rookie of the Year and the 1980 ASL Leading Scorer.

== Youth ==
Born in Coventry, England, Roche came to the U.S. in February 1971 to live with a sister. He then enrolled at the State University of New York at Brockport and joined their Men's Soccer team late in Fall 1972 when he scored five goals in three games. Rochester Democrat and Chronicle, Wednesday 9/19/73, Page 50 For the 1973 season, Roche scored 12 goals and 4 assists in 11 games as the team had a 10-1-0 record and won the SUNYAC title. NCAA Collegiate and Scholastic Soccer Guide 1974 The school declined an NCAA post-season Tournament invitation so Roche transferred to the University of San Francisco where he played on the men's soccer team from 1975 to 1976. He was a member of the Dons' 1975 and 1976 NCAA championship teams. USF inducted Roche into the school's Athletic Hall of Fame in 2002. Roche also played for the San Francisco Athletic Club's soccer team during the mid to late 1970s and was a member of the SFIAC, the only San Francisco Lamar hunt US open cup winning team ever from 1976, along with some members of the USF NCAA winning teams.

== Professional ==
In 1977, Roche signed with the Sacramento Spirits of the American Soccer League. He tied for fourth on the goals list with thirteen and was named Rookie of the Year. In 1978, he moved to the Los Angeles Skyhawks which went to the championship game, only to fall to the New York Apollo. He had a drop in goal scoring during the 1979 season and at the end of the season, the Skyhawks collapsed. In 1980, the Golden Gate Gales selected Roche in the Skyhawks' dispersal draft and he saw a return to form, leading the league in scoring with 17 goals. The Gales, like the Skyhawks before them, collapsed at the end of the season and Roche moved to the Carolina Lightnin' for the 1981 season. He scored only eight goals in 1981, but gained his first championship as the Lightnin' defeated New York United in the championship game. The Lightnin' and the ASL collapsed at the end of the 1983 season. Roche spent at least part of the 1983-1984 Major Indoor Soccer League season with the St. Louis Steamers. In 1984, Roche played for the San Francisco Glens which won the San Francisco Soccer Football League title that year.

== Yearly Awards ==
- ASL Rookie of the Year - 1977
- ASL Top Goal Scorer - 1980 (17 Goals)
- ASL Top Points Scorer - 1980 (41 Points)
