= Las Vegas Seagulls =

Defunct association football team in the United States

- Founded: 1979; 47 years ago
- Ground: Sam Boyd Stadium
- Capacity: 18,000
- League: American Soccer League
- Western Conference: 7th Overall: 13th Playoffs: DNQ
Home colors	Away colors

The Las Vegas Seagulls was an American soccer club based in Whitney, Nevada that was a member of the American Soccer League.

== 1979 Roster ==
- (United States) Ronan Downs
- (Socialist Federal Republic of Yugoslavia) Miodrag Lacevic

== Coaches ==
Raul Carrizo

== Year-by-year ==
Year	Division	League	Reg. season	Playoffs	U.S. Open Cup
1979	2	ASL	5th, Western	Did not qualify	Did not enter
