= Jamil Canal =

Brazilian footballer

Personal information
- Place of birth: Brazil
- Height: 5 ft 11 in (1.80 m)
- Position: Goalkeeper

Senior career*
| Years | Team | Apps | (Gls) |
| –1975 | New York Apollo | | |
| 1976 | Tacoma Tides | | |
| 1977–1980 | New York Apollo | | |
- * Club domestic league appearances and goals

Jamil Canal, a native of Brazil, spent most of his career as a goalkeeper in the American Soccer League. From 1973 to 1975, he was the ASL All Star goalkeeper while playing with the New York Apollo. In 1976, he moved to the expansion Tacoma Tides. However, the Tides folded at the end of the season and Canal moved back to New York where he spent the 1977 season as the backup to Keith Van Eron. Canal regained his starting position in 1978 and held it through at least the 1980 season. He continues to play today with the New York Greek-Americans’ over-30 team.
