= Gary Vogel =

American soccer player

Personal information
- Date of birth: March 3, 1956 (age 70)
- Place of birth: Buffalo, New York, United States
- Position: Defender

Youth career
- 1975–1977: Hartwick College

Senior career*
Years	Team	Apps	(Gls)
1978–1981	Minnesota Kicks	44	(0)
1979–1981	Minnesota Kicks (indoor)	29	(1)
1981	Dallas Tornado	19	(0)
1981–1982	New Jersey Rockets (indoor)	40	(7)
1982–1983	Cleveland Force (indoor)	17	(2)
1984–1989	Houston Dynamos		
- * Club domestic league appearances and goals

Gary Vogel is a retired American soccer defender who played professionally in the North American Soccer League and the Major Indoor Soccer League.

Vogel attended Hartwick College where he played on the men's soccer team from 1975 to 1977. He turned professional in 1978 with the Minnesota Kicks of the North American Soccer League. In 1981, he moved to the Dallas Tornado for a single season. He then moved indoors with the New Jersey Rockets of the Major Indoor Soccer League. After a single season with the Rockets, he moved to the Cleveland Force for the 1982–1983 season. He played for the Houston Dynamos of the United Soccer League in 1984 and continued to play for the team until at least 1989 by which time the team was playing in the Lone Star Soccer Alliance.
