= Jimmy Rolland =

Scottish footballer

Personal information
- Date of birth: 13 May 1947 (age 79)
- Place of birth: Kirkcaldy, Scotland
- Height: 1.72 m (5 ft 8 in)
- Position: Forward

Senior career*
| Years | Team | Apps | (Gls) |
| 1970–1974 | Buxton | 196 | (74) |
| 1974–1976 | Northwich Victoria | 81 | (60) |
| 1976–1978 | Los Angeles Skyhawks | 65 | (41) |
| 1980 | Phoenix Fire | 0 | (0) |
| 1980 | California Sunshine | 18 | (8) |
| 1980–1981 | San Francisco Fog (indoor) | 12 | (4) |
| Total | | 372 | (187) |
- * Club domestic league appearances and goals

Jimmy Rolland (born 13 May 1945) is a Scottish football forward who spent four seasons in the American Soccer League. He was the 1978 league leading scorer and MVP.

In 1974, he signed for Northwich Victoria from Buxton. In his first season for Northwich, he scored 45 goals in 56 games; only two other Northwich players have better records in the club's history. However the lure of the growing football scene in the USA saw him sign for the Los Angeles Skyhawks in the American Soccer League. Despite being on the LA Skyhawks' books, he returned to Northwich in 1976, scoring a vital goal in the club's best modern-time FA Cup run.

In the same season, his team, LA Skyhawks won the league championship and Rolland was the team and league's second leading scorer. In 1978, he led the league with 17 goals in 24 games, leading to his selection as league MVP.

In 1980 he was contracted to play with ASL expansion team the Phoenix Fire, but the team folded in pre-season.

In 1980, he played for the California Sunshine.

He then played for the San Francisco Fog during the 1980–81 Major Indoor Soccer League season.
