= Ken Fogarty =

English football coach

Personal information
- Date of birth: 25 January 1955 (age 71)
- Place of birth: Manchester, England
- Position: Defender

Senior career*
Years	Team	Apps	(Gls)
1972–1979	Stockport County	296	(6)
1976	→ Los Angeles Skyhawks (loan)		
1979–1983	Fort Lauderdale Strikers	102	(1)
1984	Minnesota Strikers	22	(0)
1984–1987	Minnesota Strikers(indoor)	104	(13)
1987–1988	St. Louis Steamers(indoor)	33	(4)
1988	Fort Lauderdale Strikers	45	(6)
1989–1991	Baltimore Blast (indoor)		
1989–1993	Tampa Bay Rowdies		

Managerial career
- 1989–1993: Tampa Bay Rowdies
- 1993–1994: Cayman Islands national team
- 1996–1998: Cayman Islands national team
- 1999: Kansas City Wizards (interim)
- 1999–2000: Kansas City Wizards (assistant)
- * Club domestic league appearances and goals

Ken Fogarty (born in Manchester, England) is an English football coach. Fogarty was Head Coach and Technical Director of the Cayman Islands national team from 1993 to 1994 and from 1996 to 1998.

== Professional career ==
Fogarty began his professional career with Stockport County at the age of seventeen. He then moved to the United States to play for the Los Angeles Skyhawks of the second American Soccer League (ASL) in 1976, the year they won the ASL Championship. He returned to England to play for Stockport County until returning to the US in 1979 to play for the Fort Lauderdale Strikers of the North American Soccer League (NASL). He remained with the Strikers through the end of the 1983 season. When the Strikers moved north to Minnesota, Fogarty went with the team for the final NASL season in 1984. The NASL folded at the end of that season, and the Strikers then jumped to the Major Indoor Soccer League (MISL). Fogarty continued to play with the Strikers until he joined the St. Louis Steamers for the 1987–88 MISL season. However, in 1988, the Fort Lauderdale Strikers were resurrected, this time playing in the third American Soccer League. Fogarty joined them for the outdoor season, then moved to the Baltimore Blast of MISL for the next three indoor seasons. In 1989, Fogarty left the Strikers for good and joined the Tampa Bay Rowdies of the ASL, where he served as a player-coach from 1989 to 1993. In 1990, the Rowdies joined the American Professional Soccer League (APSL). The team folded at the end of the 1993 season, and Fogarty retired from playing professionally.

== Coaching ==
While playing with the Rowdies, Fogarty also served as the team's head coach. In 1993, he was the APSL Coach of the Year. From 1994 to 1996, Fogarty served as the Technical Director for the Cayman Islands Football Association, where he oversaw the youth and Olympic team programs. After a year's absence, he assumed the position of Head Coach of the national team, steering the full squad to their most famous victory over the Jamaica national team in the Shell Caribbean cup final. The Kansas City Wizards of Major League Soccer (MLS) signed Fogarty as an assistant coach in 1999. On 15 April 1999, the Kansas City Wizards named Fogarty as its interim coach after Ron Newman resigned following an 0–4 start. After the team hired Bob Gansler, Fogarty returned to his position as an assistant coach for the next two seasons. He later became the head coach of the Eclipse Soccer Club in Sugar Land, Texas, until he left this position to coach the Texans Soccer Club.

Ken is currently a Director for uScore Soccer in Spring, Texas.

== National team ==
Fogarty played for the Republic of Ireland in the U-17 European Championships. He was also called up to the full squad for an international match against Poland, but did not play.
