= Los Angeles Skyhawks =

Former American professional soccer club

- Founded: 1976
- Dissolved: 1979
- Stadium: John Shepard Stadium
- Owner: Robert Nordskog
- League: American Soccer League

The Los Angeles Skyhawks was an American professional soccer club based in Los Angeles, California, that was a member of the American Soccer League. Founded as part of the American Soccer League's expansion to the west coast in 1976, they were the first professional sports team to be based in the San Fernando Valley area of Los Angeles. The ASL, under commissioner Bob Cousy, had expanded in an attempt to compete with the North American Soccer League. Coming into the league with the Skyhawks were the Oakland (later Golden Bay) Buccaneers, Tacoma Tides, Sacramento Spirits, and the Utah Pioneers (later Golden Spikers). These teams formed the Western Division, while the Eastern Division had the established teams New York Apollo, Connecticut Yankees, Rhode Island Oceaneers, Chicago Cats, New Jersey Americans, and Cleveland Cobras.

The Skyhawks played their games at Birmingham High School Stadium for the 1976 and 1977 seasons. At the time, Birmingham was the largest stadium in the valley with a capacity of 10,000, and it was centrally located. Many of the players commented that the field conditions and lighting were better than that at many lower division European stadiums. After 1977, the Skyhawks moved to Shephard Stadium at Los Angeles Pierce Community College.

== History ==
=== 1976: The magical first season ===
The Skyhawks managed to obtain the services of the renowned Ron Newman as their head coach, and he assembled a roster consisting of a number of young players from England's second and third divisions. Many of these players also had some limited first division experience; players such as goalkeeper Brian Parkinson (Everton), Midfielder Tony "Wheels" Whelan (Manchester City), Jimmy Rolland (Northwich Victoria), and forward Jimmy "the Price" Hinch (York), were the stars of the team. In addition, U.S. college player of the year Steve Ralbovsky (Brown University) spurned the N.A.S.L. and signed with the Skyhawks. The defense was anchored by 38-year-old sweeper and former Scottish International Ron Yeats ("the Colussus"), a veteran of the English First Division, where he was Liverpool's captain when Liverpool rose to glory in the 1960s. Hinch ended up as the A.S.L.'s leading scorer and Parkinson had the lowest goals against average (0.78) among A.S.L. goalkeepers. Led by these stars and a strong supporting cast, the Skyhawks had the league's best record (13 wins, 6 draws, 2 defeats) and regularly drew upwards of 4,000 fans per game, easily leading the ASL in attendance.

The 1976 ASL playoff format had the top 3 teams in each division qualifying for the playoffs, with the 1st place teams earning a first round bye while the 2nd place team hosted the 3rd place team.

After earning a first round bye, the Skyhawks faced the 2nd place Tacoma Tides, who had defeated Utah 2–1 in the first round. The Skyhawks took a 1–0 lead, but midway through the second half, goalkeeper Brian Parkinson suffered a head injury in a collision, and Tacoma equalized against backup keeper Marine Cano to force overtime. Facing the prospect of going into a penalty kick shootout without their #1 keeper, the Skyhawks won the game in the second 10-minute overtime period on a goal by Jimmy Rolland.

In the ASL championship game, the Skyhawks faced Eastern Division winner and defending champion New York Apollo. Over 9,000 fans showed up at Birmingham Stadium and saw the Skyhawks fall behind early, 1–0. Then late in the first half, Skyhawk defender Alty McKenzie was controversially sent off with a red card so L.A. had to play a man down the remainder of the game. But Hinch equalized early in the second half, and late in the game Ralbovsky was tripped from behind in the penalty area while on a breakaway. Skyhawk forward Ane Mihailovich buried the penalty kick into the back of the net past N.Y. keeper Gerard Joseph, and the Skyhawks were ASL champs, making Ron Newman the only man to coach an ASL and NASL champion. Hinch was named MVP, and Newman was coach of the year.

==== Roster ====
Note: Flags indicate national team as defined under FIFA eligibility rules; some limited exceptions apply. Players may hold more than one non-FIFA nationality.

No.	Pos.	Nation	Player
1	GK	ENG	Brian Parkinson
2	DF	JAM	Alty McKenzie
3	DF	ENG	Ken Fogarty
4	MF	ENG	Mickey Cave
5	DF	SCO	Ron Yeats (captain)
6	MF	USA	Steve Ralbovsky
7	FW	SCO	Jimmy Rolland
8	MF	ISR	Abraham Cohen
9	FW	ENG	Jimmy Hinch

No.	Pos.	Nation	Player
10	FW	YUG	Ane Mihailovich
11	MF	ENG	Tony Whelan
12	DF	ISR	Benny Binshtock
13	MF	NOR	Leif Werneid
14	FW	USA	Steve Cacciatore
16	GK	USA	Marine Cano
17	DF	MEX	Javier Loza
18	DF	ENG	John Willis
19	FW	USA	Jerry Kazarian
20	DF	ISR	Moshe Hoftman

=== 1977 season ===
The Skyhawks were again led offensively by Jimmy Hinch and Jimmy Rolland (who finished 2nd and 3rd in the league in scoring) and in goal by Brian Parkinson (who finished 2nd in GAA). While they couldn't duplicate their dominance of the 1976 season, they finished 2nd in the West and 4th overall with 13 wins, 4 draws, and 7 defeats. After a 3–2 first round playoff win over the California Sunshine, they lost to Western Division champion Sacramento in the Western Division playoff finals, 2–1.

==== Roster ====
Note: Flags indicate national team as defined under FIFA eligibility rules; some limited exceptions apply. Players may hold more than one non-FIFA nationality.

No.	Pos.	Nation	Player
1	GK	ENG	Brian Parkinson
9	FW	ENG	Jimmy Hinch
18	DF	ENG	John Willis
2	DF	USA	Brooks Cryder
3	DF	ESA	Miguel Lopez
16	GK	USA	Marine Cano
20	DF	ISR	Moshe Hoftman
7	FW	SCO	Jimmy Rolland

No.	Pos.	Nation	Player
17	DF	MEX	Javier Loza
4	DF	ENG	Bernie Fagan
12	MF	USA	Garo Osmanian

=== 1978 season ===
By 1978, the ASL was in severe financial difficulty, with every team losing money. On the field, the Skyhawks, led by ASL leading scorer and MVP Jimmy Rolland and goalkeeper Brian Parkinson (again 2nd in GAA), returned to the top of the Western Division and with a record of 17–6–1. They made it to the championship game for the 2nd time in 3 years, but lost in the final, 1–0 to the New York Apollo, who had the league's best record at 18–5–1.

==== Roster ====
Note: Flags indicate national team as defined under FIFA eligibility rules; some limited exceptions apply. Players may hold more than one non-FIFA nationality.

No.	Pos.	Nation	Player
1	GK	ENG	Brian Parkinson
4	DF	USA	Charlie Kadupski
3	DF	ESA	Miguel Lopez
6	MF	ENG	Alan Sproates
10	MF	ENG	Paul Taylor
7	FW	SCO	Jimmy Rolland
11	FW	ENG	Mal Roche

No.	Pos.	Nation	Player
17	DF	MEX	Javier Loza
20	DF	ISR	Moshe Hoftman
9	FW	SCO	Billy McNichol
5	MF	ENG	Geoff Davies
8	MF	SCO	Doug McMillan
12	MF	USA	Garo Osmanian
21	GK	USA	Joe Hight
2	DF	ENG	Brian Gardiner

=== 1979 season ===
The Skyhawks lost much of their scoring punch with the departures of Jimmy Hinch and Jim Rolland. Despite it all, the Skyhawks managed to place 3rd in the West with a 13–11–4 record. But the season ended with a first round playoff loss to Sacramento by a score of 3–2, in what proved to be the final Skyhawk game ever. The Skyhawks also played a friendly that season in Los Angeles Jackie Robinson Stadium against the 1980 US Men's Olympic Team in March losing the match 2–1. Due to financial difficulties, the team folded at the end of the 1979 season.

==== Roster ====
Note: Flags indicate national team as defined under FIFA eligibility rules; some limited exceptions apply. Players may hold more than one non-FIFA nationality.

No.	Pos.	Nation	Player
1	GK	ENG	Brian Parkinson
5	DF	ENG	Dave Donaldson
3	DF	USA	Leo Kulinczenko
17	DF	MEX	Javier Loza
11	FW	ENG	Mal Roche
8	MF	ARG	Carlos Zavaleta
13	DF	USA	Kurt Stierle
15	DF	IRL	Paddy Dunning
18	MF	SCO	Vinnie McCarthy

No.	Pos.	Nation	Player
10	MF	ENG	Paul Taylor
7	MF	USA	Garo Osmanian
9	FW	SCO	Billy McNichol
4	DF	ESA	Miguel Lopez
12	MF	USA	Les Peterson
2	DF	USA	Kevin Handlan
14	MF	USA	Manny Matos
16	DF	ENG	Brian Gardiner
21	GK	USA	Joe Hight

== Honors ==
Champions

- 1976

MVP

- 1976: Jimmy Hinch
- 1978: Jimmy Rolland

Leading Scorer

- 1976: Jimmy Hinch
- 1978: Jimmy Rolland

Leading Goalkeeper

- 1976: Brian Parkinson

Coach of the Year

- 1976: Ron Newman

First Team All Star

- 1977: Jimmy Hinch

== Year-by-year ==
Year	Division	League	Reg. season	Playoffs	U.S. Open Cup
1976	West	ASL	1st, West	Champion	Did not enter
1977	West	ASL	2nd, West	Semifinals	Did not enter
1978	West	ASL	1st, Western	Final	Did not enter
1979	West	ASL	3rd, Western	1st Round	Did not enter

== Management ==
- Jack Young, General Manager & Owner (1976–1977)
- Robert Nordskog, Owner (1978–1979)

== Coaches ==
- 1976 (England) Ron Newman (Head coach)
- 1978 (Poland) Max Wosniak (Head coach)
- 1978 (Scotland) Doug McMillan (Head coach)
- 1979 (England) Geoff Davies (Head coach)

== Skyhawk Trivia and Notes ==
- Colors: Black and Gold. The home uniforms featured gold jerseys with black shorts and gold socks, while the away uniforms were black jersey with black shorts and black socks.
- First game: April 17, 1976 at Birmingham Stadium. Score: Sacramento 0 Skyhawks 0 Attendance: 4,108
- First goal: April 24, 1976, scored by Leif Werneid in a 1–1 tie vs. Oakland in the second game of the season.
- Ron Newman is the only man to coach an NASL champion (Dallas Tornado), ASL champion (L.A. Skyhawks) and MISL champion (San Diego Sockers). He also coached the Kansas City Wizards to a division title in the MLS.
- Skyhawk alum Marine Cano currently runs "Mr. Soccer" Soccer camps in southern California. In addition, he has been a highly successful college women's soccer coach at Cal State Dominguez Hills and UC Irvine.
- The Skyhawks played a friendly in March 1979 against the 1980 US Olympic team at Jackie Robinson stadium losing the match 2–1. Jimmy Rolland scored the only goal for the Skyhawks before his departure to the California Sunshine.
