= Jimmy Hinch =

English footballer

Personal information
- Full name: James Hinch
- Date of birth: 8 November 1947 (age 78)
- Place of birth: Sheffield, England
- Position: Forward

Senior career*
Years	Team	Apps	(Gls)
1969–1971	Tranmere Rovers	39	(10)
1971–1973	Plymouth Argyle	107	(28)
1973–1974	Hereford United	27	(7)
1974–1977	York City	68	(12)
1974–1975	→ Southport (loan)	7	(2)
1976–1977	→ Los Angeles Skyhawks (loan)	37	(24)
1977	Sheffield Wednesday	1	(0)
1977–1978	Barnsley	12	(4)
1979–1980	California Surf	17	(2)
Total		315	(89)
- * Club domestic league appearances and goals

James Hinch (born 8 November 1947) is an English retired Association football forward who spent most of his career in the lower English divisions. He also played two seasons in the American Soccer League, where he was the 1976 ASL leading scorer MVP, and two in the North American Soccer League.

Hinch began his professional career in 1969 with Tranmere Rovers in the Football League Third Division. On 10 February 1971, Tranmere transferred Hinch to fellow third division club Plymouth Argyle. In 1973, he then moved to Hereford United. In 1974, Hinch moved up to York City which had just won promotion to the Football League Second Division the previous season. He went on loan to fourth division Southport during March and April in the 1974–1975 season. In 1976 and again in 1977, Hinch went on loan to the Los Angeles Skyhawks of the American Soccer League. The Skyhawks were established in 1976, but ran to the league championship as Hinch led the league in scoring with thirteen goals and six assists in eighteen games. This led to Hinch's selection as League MVP. In 1977, Hinch finished second behind Jose Neto in scoring with eleven goals and thirteen assists, gaining him first team All Star recognition. York City transferred Hinch to Sheffield Wednesday for the 1977–1978 season, but he played only one game for Wednesday before moving to Barnsley F.C. At the end of the season, Barnsley sold Hinch's contract to the California Surf of the North American Soccer League. He spent the 1979 and 1980 seasons with the Surf.
