= Ane Mihailovich =

Personal information
- Date of birth: November 16, 1951 (age 74)
- Place of birth: Vratnica, SFR Yugoslavia
- Positions: Forward; defender

Senior career*
Years	Team	Apps	(Gls)
1973	Detroit Mustangs		
1973–1974	Cleveland Cobras		
1976	Los Angeles Skyhawks		
1977–1978	Los Angeles Aztecs	18	(2)
1978–1979	Washington Diplomats	24	(0)
1979–1980	Detroit Lightning (indoor)	27	(11)
1980	San Jose Earthquakes	26	(1)
1980–1981	San Diego Sockers (indoor)	16	(3)
1982	Detroit Express		

International career
1977	United States	5	(0)
- * Club domestic league appearances and goals

Ane Mihailovich is a Yugoslavian-American former soccer player. He spent at least four seasons in the American Soccer League, four in the North American Soccer League and one in the Major Indoor Soccer League. He also earned five caps with the United States men's national soccer team in 1977.

== Club career ==
Mihailovich spent the 1973 and 1974 seasons with the Cleveland Stars in the American Soccer League (ASL). In 1976, Mihailovich signed with the expansion Los Angeles Skyhawks. The Skyhawks went to the ASL title game where the game was tied 1-1 until the Skyhawks' Steve Ralbovsky was tripped in the penalty area. Mihailovich converted the penalty, beating New York Apollo goalkeeper Gerard Joseph in the lower left-hand corner, and the Skyhawks won the game, 2–1. In 1977, Mihailovich jumped the first division Los Angeles Aztecs of the North American Soccer League (NASL). The Aztecs traded him to the Washington Diplomats six games into the 1978 season. The move to the Dips brought a move from forward to defense for Mihailovich. At the end of the 1979 season, the Dips sent Mihailovich to the San Jose Earthquakes in exchange for the Earthquakes first-round draft pick in 1982. for the 1980 season, his last in the NASL. While Mihailovich had played as a forward with the Skyhawks, he moved between the midfield and defense in the NASL.

== National team ==
He also earned five caps with the U.S. national team in 1977. His first cap was a 3–1 loss to Guatemala on September 18, 1977. His last cap came less than a month later in a 1–0 win over China on October 10, 1977.

== Personal life ==
Ane is now retired and living in Michigan with his wife Patricia. They have 2 children, daughter Nicole and son Sasha. They have 7 grandchildren. Ane is currently coaching Crestwood High School's Boys Varsity Soccer. He won coach of the year in 2013.
