= Oakland Buccaneers =

American soccer club

The Oakland Buccaneers was an American soccer club based in Oakland, California that was a member of the American Soccer League.

Coached by Javier de la Torre, the Buccaneers changed their name midway through the 1976 season to the Golden Bay Buccaneers as they played most of their home games in Berkeley.

== 1976 Roster ==
- (Peru) Franco Chirinos 18 Apps 7 Goals
- (United States) Gerald Hylkema 18 Apps 10 Goals
- (Colombia) Ed Rodie

Guy Oling, Defender, USA

- (Mexico) Alberto Onofre Midfielder

== Coaches ==
- (Spain) Ricardo Ordonez

== Year-by-year ==
| Year | Division | League | Reg. season | Playoffs | U.S. Open Cup |
|---|---|---|---|---|---|
| 1976 | West | ASL | 4th, West | Did not qualify | Did not enter |
