= Les Peterson =

American soccer player

Personal information
- Date of birth: December 29, 1954 (age 71)
- Place of birth: San Antonio, Texas, U.S.
- Position: Defender

Youth career
- 1974–1977: FIU Golden Panthers

Senior career*
| Years | Team | Apps | (Gls) |
| 1978 | Fort Lauderdale Strikers | 3 | (0) |
| 1978–1980 | Cleveland Force (indoor) | 48 | (5) |
| 1979 | Los Angeles Skyhawks | | |
| 1980–1981 | Fort Lauderdale Strikers | 12 | (1) |
- * Club domestic league appearances and goals

Les Peterson is an American retired soccer midfielder who played professionally in the North American Soccer League, Major Indoor Soccer League and American Soccer League.

Peterson attended Florida International University where he was a 1977 Honorable Mention (third team) All American soccer players. In 1978, the Fort Lauderdale Strikers selected Peterson in the second round of the North American Soccer League draft. He played five games for the Strikers in 1978 before being sold to the Cleveland Force of the Major Indoor Soccer League in January 1979. In 1979, he played for the Los Angeles Skyhawks in the American Soccer League. In November 1980, he returned to the Strikers, played the 1980-1981 NASL indoor season, but was released during the 1981 outdoor pre-season.
