= Simon Look =

Israeli footballer

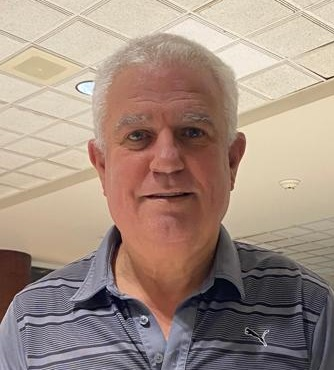

Personal information
- Date of birth: July 16, 1958 (age 68)
- Place of birth: Afula, Israel
- Position: Forward

Youth career
- Maccabi Jaffa

Senior career*
Years	Team	Apps	(Gls)
–1980	Maccabi Jaffa		
1980–1982	Cleveland Force (indoor)	65	(44)
1981	Cleveland Cobras		
- Maccabi Jaffa
- * Club domestic league appearances and goals

Simon Look is a retired Israeli football (soccer) forward who played professionally in Israel and in the American Soccer League and Major Indoor Soccer League.

== Professional ==
Look spent his youth with the Maccabi Jaffa F.C., turning professional with the first team when he was sixteen. In 1980, he moved to the United States where he signed with the Cleveland Force of the Major Indoor Soccer League. He spent two seasons with the Force and in 1981 played the summer outdoor season with the Cleveland Cobras of the American Soccer League. He then returned to Israel where he rejoined Maccabi Jaffa.

== Personal ==
Simon Look is of a Tunisian-Jewish descent. He is currently not married and has four children, three boys and one daughter. He spends most of his time coaching the younger generation as well as playing pick up games any chance he can.

== National team ==
Look played for the Israeli Junior National and the Israeli Olympic teams.
