= Gerald Hylkema =

Dutch footballer (1946–2002)

Personal information
- Full name: Gerhardus Frederikus Hijlkema
- Date of birth: February 14, 1946
- Place of birth: Groningen, Netherlands
- Date of death: March 26, 2002 (aged 56)
- Place of death: Acapulco, Mexico
- Position: Forward

Youth career
- GVAV

Senior career*
| Years | Team | Apps | (Gls) |
| 1970–1971 | GVAV | 8 | (1) |
| 1971–1973 | Groningen | 15 | (3) |
| 1973–1974 | Atlante | | (3) |
| 1975 | San Antonio Thunder | 3 | (0) |
| 1976 | Oakland Buccaneers | 17 | (10) |
| 1977–1978 | Sacramento Gold | 39 | (3) |
| 1980 | Golden Gate Gales | | |
- * Club domestic league appearances and goals

Gerald Hylkema (February 14, 1946 – March 26, 2002) was a Dutch professional football forward who played three games in the North American Soccer League and several seasons in the American Soccer League.

Hijlkema began his athletic career in field hockey. In 1968, he was part of the Dutch field hockey team at the 1968 Summer Olympics. In 1970, he turned to professional football when he signed with FC Groningen but he spent his first season with the reserves. In 1971, Hijlkema gained promotion to the first team where he saw limited time over two seasons. He then played for Atlante in Mexico. In the meantime, Hijlkema became a model in Mexico City and featured in commercials and B-movies.

In 1975, known as Gerald Hylkema in the US, he played three games for the San Antonio Thunder of the North American Soccer League. In 1976, he played for the Oakland Buccaneers of the American Soccer League. In 1977 and 1978, he played for the Sacramento Gold. In 1980, the Golden Gate Gales selected Hylkema in the ASL Dispersal Draft.

== Post-playing career ==
After he retired from playing professionally, Hylkema settled in the San Francisco Bay area where he coached. In the 1984/1985 season, he coached the soccer team of the California State University in Sacramento.

In 2002, on holidays in Acapulco, Hylkema died from a heart failure.
