= Altamont McKenzie =

Jamaican footballer (born 1951)

Personal information
- Date of birth: 5 March 1951 (age 75)
- Place of birth: Kingston, Jamaica
- Height: 5 ft 7 in (1.70 m)
- Position: Defender

Youth career
- 1970–1973: SUNY Oneonta

Senior career*
| Years | Team | Apps | (Gls) |
| 1974–1975 | Dallas Tornado | 21 | (3) |
| 1976 | Tacoma Tides | 4 | (0) |
| 1976 | Los Angeles Skyhawks | 2 | (0) |
| 1976–1977 | PEC Zwolle | | |
| 1977–1978 | Los Angeles Skyhawks | 29 | (2) |

International career
| 1978–1980 | Jamaica | | |
- * Club domestic league appearances and goals

Altamont McKenzie (born 5 March 1951) is a retired Jamaican football (soccer) defender who spent two seasons in the North American Soccer League and at least one in the American Soccer League. He also played for the Jamaica national football team from 1978 to 1980.

McKenzie attended SUNY Oneonta where he both played soccer and ran track from 1970 to 1973. He graduated in 1974 and was inducted into the school's Hall of Fame in 2000. The Dallas Tornado of the North American Soccer League drafted McKenzie in 1974. He spent two seasons in Texas before moving to the Tacoma Tides for the start of the 1976 American Soccer League season. He was traded to the Los Angeles Skyhawks mid way during the season, and helped L.A. win the ASL title. He played in de Dutch Second Division for PEC Zwolle. He retired in 1978.

He currently lives in Jamaica where he co-owns a rum distillery with fellow footballer Desmond Munroe.
