= Danilo Mandic =

Danilo Mandic from the Imperial College London, London, UK was named Fellow of the Institute of Electrical and Electronics Engineers (IEEE) in 2013 for contributions to multivariate and nonlinear learning systems.
