= Brooks Cryder =

American soccer player

Personal information
- Date of birth: January 13, 1955 (age 71)
- Place of birth: Philadelphia, Pennsylvania, U.S.
- Position: Defender

Youth career
- 1975: Philadelphia Textile

Senior career*
Years	Team	Apps	(Gls)
1976	Tacoma Tides		
1977	Los Angeles Skyhawks		
1978–1979	Philadelphia Fury	40	(0)
1979–1980	Cleveland Force (indoor)	32	(6)
- Pennsylvania Stoners
- * Club domestic league appearances and goals

Brooks Cryder (born January 13, 1955) is an American retired soccer defender who played professionally in the American Soccer League, North American Soccer League and Major Indoor Soccer League.

Cryder graduated from Roxborough High School. He spent at least one season, 1975, with the Philadelphia Textile soccer team. Drafted by the Philadelphia Atoms of the North American Soccer League in 1976, Cryder elected instead to play for the Tacoma Tides of the American Soccer League. He played the 1977 season with the Los Angeles Skyhawks. In 1978, Cryder signed with the Philadelphia Fury of the North American Soccer League. That fall, he also signed with the Cleveland Force of the Major Indoor Soccer League. He also played for the Pennsylvania Stoners.
