= Tacoma Tides =

American soccer club

The Tacoma Tides was an American soccer club based in Tacoma, Washington that was a member of the American Soccer League. It began play in 1976, but the league folded the following year. It was owned by businessman and future governor Booth Gardner; among its players was backup goalkeeper Bruce Arena, who later coached several Major League Soccer champions and the United States men's national team.

== Year-by-year ==
In their only year of existence, the Tides finished 2nd in the ASL Western Division. They defeated the Utah Golden Spikers in the playoff quarterfinals, 2–1, then lost in overtime to the eventual champion Los Angeles Skyhawks in the semifinals by a score of 2–1.

Year	Division	League	Reg. season	Playoffs	U.S. Open Cup
1976	2	ASL	2nd, West	Semifinals	Did not enter

== Management ==
- Booth Gardner – Owner
- Stan Naccarato – General Manager

== Coach ==
- Dan Wood
- David Chadwick (assistant)

== Roster ==
Note: Flags indicate national team as defined under FIFA eligibility rules; some limited exceptions apply. Players may hold more than one non-FIFA nationality.

No.	Pos.	Nation	Player
1	GK	BRA	Jamil Canal
1	GK	USA	Bruce Arena
2	DF	ENG	Mickey Rooney
3	DF	JAM	Altamont McKenzie
4	MF	USA	Ben Brewster
5	DF	WAL	Wayne Cegielski
6	DF	RSA	Bill Wilkinson
7	FW	RSA	Bernard Hartze
8	MF	ENG	Roy Sinclair
9	FW	USA	Charlie Myers

No.	Pos.	Nation	Player
10	MF	ENG	David Chadwick
11	FW	USA	Chris Agoliati
12	MF	USA	Rich Reinecke
13	FW	USA	Frank Gallo
14	DF		Chris Witworth
15	FW	USA	Andy Rymarczuk
16	DF	USA	Carl Milford
17	MF	BOL	Windsor del Llano
18	DF	USA	Len Dudkowski
19	FW	URU	Pepe Fernandez
