= Joe Hight =

American journalist and academic

Joe Hight is an American journalist and academic who, as of 2023, holds the Edith Kinney Gaylord Endowed Chair of Journalism Ethics at the University of Central Oklahoma. He was the editor of the Colorado Springs Gazette in 2014 when it won the Pulitzer Prize in National Reporting. He is an inductee of the Oklahoma Journalism Hall of Fame.
