= Brian Parkinson =

English footballer

Personal information
- Date of birth: 14 January 1954
- Place of birth: Liverpool, Lancashire, England
- Position: Goalkeeper

Senior career*
Years	Team	Apps	(Gls)
1974–1976	Everton	1	(0)
1976–1979	Los Angeles Skyhawks	38+	(0)
1977	→ Santa Barbara Condors (loan)		
1980	Miami Americans		
1980	California Sunshine		
- * Club domestic league appearances and goals

Brian Parkinson is an English former professional footballer who played as a goalkeeper, spending five seasons in the American Soccer League.

Parkinson began his career with Everton, where he earned the backup goalkeeper job for a brief spell at the age of 18. In 1976, he moved to the Los Angeles Skyhawks where he had the lowest goals against average (0.78) among American Soccer League goalkeepers for the league champions. His exploits led to him being nicknamed "Superstop." He followed that in 1977 when he had the second lowest goals against average among ASL keepers. In 1980, he spent one season with the Miami Americans.
