= Golden Gate Gales =

Former American soccer club

The Golden Gate Gales was an American soccer club based in Hayward, California that was a member of the American Soccer League in 1980. In their only season, Mal Roche was top scorer in the league with 17 goals.

After starting the season and playing only six games at Pioneer Stadium on the campus of California State University, Hayward (now California State University, East Bay), the Gales moved and played the majority of their home games at Tak Fudenna Stadium in Fremont, California, on the campus of Washington High School.

== Players ==
- John Spurgeon G United States
- Monsour Afshinpour G Iran
- Tony Igwe D
- Bjorn Dahl M Norway
- Joe Berrico D
- Alan Sproates M England
- Gerald Hylkema M Netherlands
- Johnny Moore M Scotland
- Mal Roche F United States
- Alex Basso F United States
- Tony Hauser D United States
- John Anton M United States
- Peter Young F
- Lee Cornwell M England
- Tony Gray M
- John Brooks M

== Coach ==
Lee Atack Head Coach

- (Netherlands) Joseph De Graef
- (Argentina) Osvaldo Garcia

== Year-by-year ==
Year	Division	League	Reg. season	Playoffs	U.S. Open Cup
1980	2	ASL	4th, American	Did not qualify	Did not enter
