= Trevor Franklin (soccer) =

English-American soccer player

Personal information
- Date of birth: June 2, 1957 (age 69)
- Place of birth: Liverpool, England
- Position: Defender

Youth career
- 1975–1978: Keene State College

Senior career*
Years	Team	Apps	(Gls)
1979	New England Tea Men	0	(0)
1979	Minnesota Kicks	1	(0)
1980–1981	Atlanta Chiefs	15	(0)
1980–1981	Atlanta Chiefs (indoor)	17	(3)
1981	Washington Diplomats	16	(0)
1981–1982	Cleveland Force (indoor)	26	(5)
1982–1983	Detroit Express		
- * Club domestic league appearances and goals

Trevor Franklin (born June 2, 1957) is an English-American retired professional soccer defender.

Franklin attended Keene State College, where he was a 1977 and 1978 NAIA first team All-American soccer player. He was inducted into the school's Athletic Hall of Fame in 2002. In 1979, Franklin began his professional career with the New England Tea Men of the North American Soccer League. The Tea Men sent him to the Minnesota Kicks during the season. In 1980, he moved to the Atlanta Chiefs where he played the 1980 outdoor and 1980-1981 indoor season. In May 1981, the Chiefs sold Franklin's contract to the Washington Diplomats. Franklin then played for the Cleveland Force during the 1981-1982 Major Indoor Soccer League season. He ended his career in the American Soccer League, playing the 1982 and 1983 seasons with the Detroit Express.
