= 1978 American Soccer League =

American Soccer League

American Soccer League 1978 season
- Season: 1978
- Teams: 10
- Champions: New York Apollo (4th title)
- Premiers: New York Apollo (4th title)
- Top goalscorer: Jimmy Rolland (17); Mike Mancini; José Neto

Statistics of American Soccer League II in season 1978.

== League standings ==
Eastern Division
Team	Pld	W	D	L	GF	GA	BP	Pts
New York Apollo	24	18	1	5	65	37	51	143
New Jersey Americans	24	10	1	13	49	45	42	94
Indianapolis Daredevils	24	8	3	13	33	41	32	78
New York Eagles	24	6	5	13	33	55	33	73
Cleveland Cobras	24	7	4	13	27	55	25	68
Connecticut Yankees	24	6	2	16	24	53	24	58

Western Division
Team	Pld	W	D	L	GF	GA	BP	Pts
Los Angeles Skyhawks	24	17	1	6	55	28	43	130
California Sunshine	24	15	2	7	55	27	45	124
Southern California Lazers	24	15	1	8	44	29	40	117
Sacramento Spirits/Gold (Note: Sacramento Spirits expelled from league during the season and replaced by Sacramento Gold franchise.)	24	7	2	15	27	42	25	64

== ASL All-Stars ==
First Team	Position
John Granville, Southern California	G
Rildo, Southern California	D
Daniel Mammana, Sacramento	D
Paul Cahill, Southern California	D
Ramon Moraldo, California	D
Juan Cano, New Jersey	M
Ramón Mifflin, NY Eagles	M
Kevin Mahon, NY Apollo	M
Sid Wallace, Southern California	F
Tony Douglas, California	F
Jimmy Rolland, Los Angeles	F

== Playoffs ==
=== Bracket ===
Division semifinals (single match)
New Jersey Americans	4
Indianapolis Daredevils	2
California Sunshine	1(6)
Southern California Lazers	1(5)

Division finals (2-match aggregate)
New York Apollo	0	5	5
New Jersey Americans	2	2	4
Los Angeles Skyhawks	1	4	5
California Sunshine	0	1	1

ASL Championship Final (single match)
New York Apollo	1
Los Angeles Skyhawks	0

=== Division semifinals ===
August 29	New Jersey Americans	4–2	Indianapolis Daredevils	Rutgers Stadium • Att. 2,576

August 29	California Sunshine	1–1 (PK, 6–5)	Southern California Lazers	LeBard Stadium • Att. 3,714

=== Division finals ===
Higher Seed	Aggregate	Lower Seed	First leg	Second leg	Attendance
New York Apollo	5–4	New Jersey Americans	0–2	5–2 (OT)	August 31 • Rutgers Stadium • ??? September 2 • Hofstra Stadium • 5,134
Los Angeles Skyhawks	5–2	California Sunshine	1–0	4–1	August 31 • LeBard Stadium • 3,000; September 2 • John Shepard Stadium • 4,938

=== Championship final ===
September 10, 1978
4:00 PM PST

Los Angeles Skyhawks (CA)	0–1	New York Apollo (NY)
	Report 1 Report 2	Rupert De Los Reyes 44:10'

John Shepard Stadium, Los Angeles, California
Attendance: 6,242
Referee: (USA)
