= Pittsburgh Miners =

The Pittsburgh Miners were a professional soccer club based in Pittsburgh, Pennsylvania. They were a member of the American Soccer League in 1975 but folded at the end of the season after finishing with a record of 1-16-3. Joe Luxbacher was the top scorer with six goals and 4 assists.

== 1975 roster ==
- (United States) Mike Angellotti

Ciro Baldini

- (United States) Charlie Duccilli
- (United States) Bill Fann
- (United States) John Fitzgerald
- (United States) Mickey Fitzgerald
- (United States) Tom Fitzgerald
- (United States) Billy Haines
- (United States) Sonny Ideozu

Galo Iquirre

- (United States) Bob Kohlmyer
- (United States) Dennis Kohlmyer
- (United States) Joe Luxbacher
- (United States) Ron McEachen
- (United States) Tom Martin
- (United States) Lew Meehl
- (United States) Ron Nentwig
- (United States) Art Richardson
- (United States) Skip Roderick
- (United States) Stan Startzell
- (United States) Sam Viecelli
- (United States) Lenny Williams
- (United States) Ed Yohman

== Head coach ==
Name	Country	Games	Won	Lost	Tied	Notes
Scotty Foley	USA	19	1	16	2	Fired on August 29, 1975
John Foley	USA	1	0	0	1	

== 1975 Game Results ==
Game	Day	Date	Opponent	Game site	Final score	W/L/T	Record
1	Saturday	May 3	at Cincinnati Comets	Trechter Stadium	1-1	T	0-0-1
2	Saturday	May 10	at Connecticut Yankees	Dillon Stadium	0-4	L	0-1-1
3	Saturday	May 17	New York Apollo	North Hills HS Stadium	0-1	L	0-2-1
4	Saturday	May 24	at Chicago Cats		2-5	L	0-3-1
5	Monday	May 26	at Cleveland Cobras	George Finnie Stadium	1-3	L	0-4-1
6	Saturday	May 31	Connecticut Yankees	North Hills HS Stadium	0-0	T	0-4-2
7	Saturday	June 7	at New Jersey Brewers		1-3	L	0-5-2
8	Saturday	June 14	Cincinnati Comets	North Hills HS Stadium	2-1	W	1-5-2
9	Saturday	June 21	at Rhode Island Oceaneers		1-4	L	1-6-2
10	Saturday	June 28	Boston Astros	North Hills HS Stadium	1-4	L	1-7-2
11	Saturday	July 5	Cleveland Cobras	North Hills HS Stadium	1-2	L	1-8-2
12	Tuesday	July 16	Indiana Tigers	North Hills HS Stadium		L	1-9-2
13	Saturday	July 19	at New York Apollo			L	1-10-2
14	Saturday	July 26	Rhode Island Oceaneers	Mt. Lebanon HS Stadium	0-1	L	1-11-2
15	Friday	August 1	at Cleveland Cobras	George Finnie Stadium	1-4	L	1-12-2
16	Saturday	August 9	Chicago Cats	Mt. Lebanon HS Stadium	0-2	L	1-13-2
17	Saturday	August 16	at Boston Astros	Nickerson Field	2-4	L	1-14-2
18	Wednesday	August 20	Cleveland Cobras	Mt. Lebanon HS Stadium	3-4	L	1-15-2
19	Saturday	August 23	at Cincinnati Comets	Trechter Stadium	1-2	L	1-16-2
20	Saturday	August 30	New Jersey Brewers	Mt. Lebanon HS Stadium	0-0	T	1-16-3

== Year-by-year ==
Year	Division	League	Reg. season	Playoffs	U.S. Open Cup
1975	2	ASL	3rd, South	Did not qualify	Did not enter
