= Pittsburgh Canons =

American Soccer League team

The Pittsburgh Canons were an American soccer club based in Pittsburgh, Pennsylvania, that was a member of the American Soccer League during the 1972 season.

== Overview ==
The franchise was granted by the ASL in early June 1972, and was formed largely from players on the Canonsburg Maggis club that played in the amateur Keystone Soccer League. The team's president was James T. Maggi, with Scotty Foley serving as both the coach and general manager. Not realizing that the team's roots were in the borough of Canonsburg, out-of-town newspapers frequently misspelled their nickname as the "Cannons."

The Canons played the first of their four home games at South Stadium (now George K. Cupples Stadium) in the South Side of Pittsburgh, drawing about a thousand fans; the other three games were held at Memorial Stadium in Canonsburg. After losing what owner Maggi said was "a great deal of money", the club returned to amateur status and qualified for the 1973 U.S. Open Cup, losing to eventual runners-up Inter-Italian SC.

== Year-by-year ==
| Year | League | Record | GF | GA | Position | Playoffs | U.S. Open Cup |
|---|---|---|---|---|---|---|---|
| 1972 | ASL | 2–1–5 | 11 | 18 | 4th, Midwestern | did not qualify | did not enter |

=== Final conference standings ===
| Midwest Conference | G | W | D | L | GF | GA | PTS |
|---|---|---|---|---|---|---|---|
| Cincinnati Comets | 8 | 6 | 1 | 1 | 19 | 7 | 13 |
| Cleveland Stars | 8 | 6 | 0 | 2 | 23 | 10 | 6 |
| Detroit Mustangs | 8 | 2 | 2 | 4 | 13 | 28 | 6 |
| Pittsburgh Canons | 8 | 2 | 1 | 5 | 11 | 18 | 5 |
| St. Louis Frogs | 8 | 2 | 0 | 6 | 13 | 16 | 4 |
| Chicago Americans* | ? | ? | ? | ? | ? | ? | ? |

*Chicago Americans played only a few games

=== Regular season results ===
| Date | Opponent | Venue | Result | Goal scorers | Ref |
|---|---|---|---|---|---|
| July 2, 1972 | Detroit Mustangs | A | 2–2 | Gus Theofilos, Don Dreher | |
| July 8, 1972 | Cincinnati Comets | H | 1–2 | Nick Pascarella | |
| July 12, 1972 | Cleveland Stars | A | 0–1 | – | |
| July 22, 1972 | St. Louis Frogs | H | 2–3 | Don Dreher (2) | |
| July 29, 1972 | Detroit Mustangs | H | 3–1 | Nick Liberati (2), Bill Smythe | |
| August 5, 1972 | Cincinnati Comets | A | 1–4 | Nick Liberati | |
| August 13, 1972 | Cleveland Stars | H | 1–5 | ??? | |
| August 27, 1972 | St. Louis Frogs | A | 1–0 | Don Dreher | |
