= St. Louis Frogs =

American soccer club

The St. Louis Frogs were an American soccer club. The Frogs were owned by Giesler Sports Enterprises and given sanction to enter the American Soccer League's newly-formed Midwest Conference by the United States Soccer Football Association at the 1972, summer meetings in Anchorage. The team played only one season and was coached by Pete Traina, with Walter J. Giesler serving as general manager. Their colors were green and white, and they played their home matches at Giesler's Sports Village.

== Team name ==
In a newspaper interview Giesler stated that the team named stemmed from a cast iron frog that had been found during a remodeling of his sporting goods store. Construction workers told him that it was an old good luck tradition of contractors to place a frog of some sort inside a wall during construction. The frog wound up becoming a decoration on his desk. Originally he had wanted to call the team the Missouri Mules, but the name had already been taken. As he struggled to come up with an original name, he realized the answer was sitting right on his desk, and thus the St. Louis Frogs were born.

== Year-by-year ==
Year	League	Record	GF	GA	Position	Playoffs	U.S. Open Cup
1972	ASL	2–6	13	16	5th, Midwestern	Did not qualify	Did not enter

=== Final conference standings ===
Midwest Conference	G	W	D	L	GF	GA	PTS
Cincinnati Comets	8	6	1	1	19	7	13
Cleveland Stars	8	6	0	2	23	10	6
Detroit Mustangs	8	2	2	4	13	28	6
Pittsburgh Canons	8	2	1	5	11	18	5
St. Louis Frogs	8	2	0	6	13	16	4
Chicago Americans*	?	?	?	?	?	?	?

*Chicago Americans played only a few games

== Game-by-game ==
=== Friendly results ===
Date	Opponent	Venue	Result	Goal scorers	Ref
July 12, 1972	SV Falke-Steinfeld (West Germany)	H	1–1	Gary McBrady	

=== Regular season results ===
Date	Opponent	Venue	Result	Goal scorers	Ref
July 15, 1972	Cleavland Stars	A	0–2	–	
July 22, 1972	Pittsburgh Canons	A	2–3	Gary McBrady, Paul Pisani, Jim Niehoff	
July 30, 1972	Cincinnati Comets	H	0–1	–	
August 12, 1972	Cincinnati Comets	A	3–0	–	
August 13, 1972	Detroit Mustangs	A	3–1	Frank Fischer	
August 20, 1972	Cleavland Stars	H	0–4	–	
August 27, 1972	Pittsburgh Canons	H	0–1	–	
September 4, 1972	Detroit Mustangs	H	9–0	Mike Villa (2), Niehoff (2), McBrady (2), John Deinowski, Tom Beaver, Jack Blake	
