= Ringo Cantillo =

Costa Rican-American soccer player (born 1956)

Personal information
- Full name: Julio M. Cantillo
- Date of birth: May 21, 1956 (age 70)
- Place of birth: Cartago, Costa Rica
- Position: Midfielder

Senior career*
Years	Team	Apps	(Gls)
1972–1975	Cincinnati Comets	102	(3)
1975	→ Tampa Bay Rowdies (indoor) (loan)	4	(5)
1975–76	New York Inter-Giuliana SC		
1976	→ Tampa Bay Rowdies (loan)	21	(0)
1977	New Jersey Americans	24	(5)
1978–1980	New England Tea Men	84	(3)
1979–1980	New England Tea Men (indoor)	3	(0)
1981–1982	Jacksonville Tea Men	56	(2)
1982–1983	New York Arrows (indoor)	19	(3)
1983	Team America	13	(0)
1984	Jacksonville Tea Men		

International career
1979–1982	United States	11	(0)
- * Club domestic league appearances and goals

Julio "Ringo" Cantillo is a former professional soccer player who played as a midfielder. Born in Costa Rica, he represented the United States. He played five seasons in the American Soccer League where he was the league MVP as a rookie. He won MVP honors a total of three times in the ASL. Cantillo also spent parts of seven seasons in the North American Soccer League and four in NASL indoor, one in the United Soccer League and one in Major Indoor Soccer League. Born in Costa Rica, Cantillo earned eleven caps with the U.S. national soccer team between 1979 and 1982.

== Professional career ==
Cantillo, a native of Costa Rica, began his professional soccer career with the Cincinnati Comets of the American Soccer League in 1972. Cantillo was only 17 years old, but quickly established himself as among the most talented players in the league when he won MVP honors as a rookie. The Comets also won the league championship that season. Cantillo earned MVP honors in 1974, and in 1975 was a first team All Star for the fourth consecutive year. In February 1975 the Comets loaned him to the Tampa Bay Rowdies of the North American Soccer League for the upcoming NASL indoor tournament. Castillo went on to win the Regional MVP award, before getting injured early in the championship final. He scored five goals in four games for the 1975 indoor Rowdies. At the end of the 1975 ASL season, the Comets traded Cantillo to New York Inter-Giuliana SC, of the semi-pro German-American Soccer League, which played in the winter months. They also loaned him to Tampa Bay for the 1976 NASL season. He played a single season, twenty-one games total, with the Rowdies before returning to the ASL, this time signing with the New Jersey Americans. Cantillo was part of the ASL's most exciting team as the Americans played a free-flowing attacking game which took them to the 1977 championship. Cantillo was again the league MVP, his third in five years in the ASL, and a first team All Star. Cantillo jumped leagues again at the end of the 1977 season. He joined the New England Tea Men of the NASL. He would remain with this team in its various incarnations until 1985, except for 1983 when he played for Team America. The Tea Men spent the 1978–1980 seasons in New England before moving to Jacksonville, Florida at the end of the 1980 season. Cantillo moved with the team and played the 1981 and 1982 seasons with Jacksonville. In the fall of 1982, he signed with the New York Arrows of Major Indoor Soccer League. He spent one season with the Arrows. In 1983, he signed with Team America. That year, the U.S. Soccer Federation attempted to create a more successful U.S. national team by entering the team into the NASL as a franchise. However, the team stumbled to a 10–20 record and the bottom of the league standings and USSF pulled the national team from the NASL at the end of the season. In 1984, Cantillo returned to the Tea Men who by then played in the United Soccer League.

== National team ==
Cantillo earned eleven caps with the U.S. national soccer team between 1979 and 1982. He has represented his country in four FIFA World Cup qualification matches. Although part of Team America in 1983 he was never called up for the U.S. games that year. Cantillo played his first game with the U.S. in its only 1979 match, a 3–1 win over Barbados. He played his last game on March 21, 1982, in a 2–1 win over Trinidad and Tobago.

== Honors ==
Cincinnati Comets

- ASL: 1972
- ASL: 1973 (finalist)

New Jersey Americans

- ASL: 1977

Tampa Bay Rowdies

- NASL indoor: 1975 (finalist)
- NASL regular season: 1976

Individual

American Soccer League

- Most Valuable Player: 1972, 1974, 1977
- All-Star selections: 1972, 1973, 1974, 1975, 1977

North American Soccer League

- Regional MVP: 1975 indoor
