= 1977 American Soccer League =

American Soccer League 1977 season
- Season: 1977
- Teams: 9
- Champions: New Jersey Americans
- Premiers: New Jersey Americans
- Top goalscorer: José Neto (17)

Statistics of the 1977 season of American Soccer League II.

The Santa Barbara Condors had been granted an expansion franchise but folded during the season due to financial difficulties.

== League standings ==
Eastern Division
Team	Pld	W	D	L	GF	GA	BP	Pts
New Jersey Americans	24	16	1	7	48	29	41	123
New York Apollo	24	10	1	13	49	45	42	94
Connecticut Yankees	24	8	2	14	37	48	35	79
New England Oceaneers	24	8	2	14	35	42	33	77
Cleveland Cobras	24	9	2	13	29	41	27	76

Western Division
Team	Pld	W	D	L	GF	GA	BP	Pts
Sacramento Spirits	26	18	4	4	35	23	24	122
Los Angeles Skyhawks	24	13	4	7	44	33	41	114
California Sunshine	24	8	2	14	36	51	35	79
Santa Barbara Condors	12	4	4	4	15	12	13	41

== ASL All-Stars ==
First Team	Position
Keith Van Eron, New York	G
Telmo Pires, New Jersey	D
Daniel Mammana, Sacramento	D
Paul Dawidczynski, New York	D
Leo Ramas, New England	D
Ringo Cantillo, New Jersey	M
Juan Cano, New Jersey	M
Mario Garcia, New York	M
Tony Douglas, California	F
Jose Neto, New Jersey	F
Jimmy Hinch, Los Angeles	F

== Playoffs ==
=== Bracket ===
Division semifinals
W2	Los Angeles Skyhawks	3
W3	California Sunshine	2
E2	New York Apollo	3
E3	Connecticut Yankees	0

Division finals
W1	Sacramento Spirits	3
W2	Los Angeles Skyhawks	2
E1	New Jersey Americans	1
E2	New York Apollo	0

ASL Championship
W1	Sacramento Spirits	0
E1	New Jersey Americans	3

=== Division semifinals ===
August 27	Los Angeles Skyhawks	3–2 (2OT)	California Sunshine	Birmingham Stadium • Att. 6,471

August 29	New York Apollo	3–0	Connecticut Yankees	Hofstra Stadium • Att. 348

=== Division finals ===
August 31	New Jersey Americans	1–0	New York Apollo	Wall Stadium • Att. 3,107

August 31	Sacramento Spirits	3–2	Los Angeles Skyhawks	Hornet Stadium • Att. 6.730

=== Championship final ===
September 4, 1977
4:00 PM EST

New Jersey Americans (NJ)	3–0	Sacramento Spirits (CA)
Ringo Cantillo 26' (Walsh); Telmo Pires 71'; Juan Cano 86' (Austin)	Report

Rutgers Stadium, Piscataway, New Jersey
Attendance: 6,493
Referee: (USA)
