= 1974 American Soccer League =

American Soccer League 1974 season
- Season: 1974
- Teams: 10
- Champions: Rhode Island Oceaneers
- Premiers: Rhode Island Oceaneers
- Top goalscorer: Mohammad Attiah (11)
- Longest unbeaten run: Rhode Island Oceaneers (18)

Statistics of the American Soccer League II for the 1974 season.

== League standings ==
East Conference
Team	Pld	W	D	L	GF	GA	Pts
New York Apollo	18	13	3	2	34	16	29
Boston Astros	18	9	3	6	33	20	21
New Jersey Brewers	18	8	5	5	32	32	21
Connecticut Wildcats	18	6	4	8	27	31	16
Delaware Wings	18	2	2	14	22	48	6

Midwest Conference
Team	Pld	W	D	L	GF	GA	Pts
Rhode Island Oceaneers	18	16	2	0	47	9	34
Cincinnati Comets	18	8	5	5	36	31	21
Cleveland Cobras	18	8	3	7	33	31	19
Indiana Tigers	18	5	3	10	21	35	13
Syracuse Suns (Note: Syracuse folded after going winless in their first five matches, and forfeited the remaining games.)	18	0	0	18	2	33	0

Source: rsssf.com

== Playoffs ==
=== Bracket ===
Semifinals (Single match)
M1	Rhode Island Oceaneers	2
E2	Boston Astros*	2
E1	New York Apollo	2
M2	Cincinnati Comets	1

ASL Championship Series (Aggregate + playoff replay)
M1	Rhode Island Oceaneers	1	2#	3
E1	New York Apollo	2	1#	2

#Play suspended after extra time because of weather.

=== Semifinals ===
September 11	Rhode Island Oceaneers	2–2*	Boston Astros	Pierce Memorial Field • Att. ???

September 11	New York Apollo	2–1	Cincinnati Comets	Metropolitan Oval • Att. ???

*Boston Astros forfeit for refusing to play overtime.

=== ASL Championship Series ===
The ASL championship was set as a two-match aggregate, with overtime to be played after the second leg to break a tie. Game 2 finished regulation with the teams tied on aggregate, 3–3. With the first overtime completed, a violent thunderstorm flooded the field and knocked out the stadium lights, effectively ending the match. A week later the match was replayed. After the Oceaneers' Rich Kratzer tied it late in regulation, the teams again went to extra time. In the second half of extra time Rhode Island got goals from Mohammad Attiah and Charlie McCully for the win, before New York added a final tally late.

Higher seed	Aggregate	Lower seed	Game 1	#Game 2	Playoff	Attendance
Rhode Island Oceaneers	7–6	New York Apollo	1–2	2–1(AET)	3–2(AET)	September 17 • Metropolitan Oval • ??? September 21 • Pierce Memorial Field • ??? September 28 • Pierce Memorial Field • 10,506

#Play suspended after first overtime because of weather.
