= Steve Ralbovsky =

Yugoslav-American soccer player

Personal information
- Date of birth: January 9, 1953 (age 73)
- Place of birth: Bačka, FPR Yugoslavia
- Height: 5 ft 8 in (1.73 m)
- Positions: Defender; midfielder

College career
Years	Team	Apps	(Gls)
1972–1975	Brown Bears		

Senior career*
Years	Team	Apps	(Gls)
1976	Los Angeles Skyhawks	22	(2)
1977	Chicago Sting	10	(0)
1978	Colorado Caribou	23	(0)
1979	Tulsa Roughnecks	1	(0)
1979–1981	Fort Lauderdale Strikers	62	(2)
1979–1981	Fort Lauderdale Strikers (indoor)	21	(1)
1982	Tulsa Roughnecks	21	(1)
1983–1984	Jacksonville Tea Men		
1988	Fort Lauderdale Strikers		

International career
1976–1978	United States	15	(0)
- * Club domestic league appearances and goals

Steve Ralbovsky is a Yugoslav-American former soccer player. He was the 1975 Hermann Trophy winner as the outstanding collegiate soccer player of the year. He then had an extensive professional career including time in the North American Soccer League and the American Soccer League II and III.

== High school and college ==
Born in Yugoslavia, Ralbovsky moved to the United States in 1970. He played soccer at DeWitt Clinton High School in New York City. His excellent play led to his receiving the Public School Athletic League Iron Horse Pegasus Award in 1971–1972 for soccer. After graduating from high school, he attended Brown University, where he starred on the school's men's soccer team. He played both defender and defensive midfielder. During his four seasons with the Bears (1972–1975), Brown dominated the Ivy League. Harvard had been the team to beat in years past, but beginning in 1972, Brown reeled off five straight Ivy League championships. In 1973 and 1975, the team made it to the NCAA Final Four, losing both times in the semi-finals. In 1973, they lost to St. Louis University and in 1975 to the University of San Francisco. Ralbovsky garnered numerous individual awards during his time at Brown. He was selected as All Ivy League in 1974 and 1975. In 1975, he was named as a first team All-American, ironically enough as a forward; the NCAA Tournament Defensive MVP and the Hermann Trophy recipient as the year's outstanding collegiate soccer player. He was inducted into the Brown University Athletic Hall of Fame.

== Professional ==
When Ralbovsky finished his four years at Brown, both the North American Soccer League and the de facto second division American Soccer League (ASL) vied for his services. The Los Angeles Skyhawks of the ASL managed to lure him to the lower league with a higher compensation package than the NASL's Los Angeles Aztecs offered him. Both the Skyhawks of the ASL and the Aztecs of the NASL had selected Ralbovsky with the number one pick in the leagues’ respective college drafts. Ralbovsky had an immediate impact on the Skyhawks as they ran away with the 1976 ALS championship, defeating the New York Apollo 2–1 in the title game. It was in that game when, with the score tied at 1, Ralbovsky was tripped from behind in the penalty area while on a breakaway – the resulting penalty kick was converted to give the Skyhawks the title. Ralbovsky was named joint Rookie of the Year with John Roeslein of the New Jersey Americans. While Ralbovsky's play with the Skyhawks brought him to the attention of the national team, he didn't stick around to play a second season in Los Angeles. Instead, he jumped leagues to NASL where he joined the Chicago Sting for the 1977 season. Once again he played only a single season with his team before moving again, this time to the Colorado Caribous, also of the NASL, for the 1978 season. He moved yet again after only a single season, this time his last move, to the Fort Lauderdale Strikers, where he rejoined his former Skyhawk manager, Ron Newman. He played with the Strikers for three years, 1979–1981, as a left back. In 1979, he played only 11 games. However, in 1980 and 1981, he became an integral part of the Strikers back line, playing 28 and 22 games per season. In 1980, the Strikers made it to the NASL championship game before losing to the New York Cosmos by a score of 3–0. In 1981, the Strikers again went deep in the playoffs before losing again to the Cosmos, this time in the semifinal game. After the 1981 season, Ralbovsky returned to the American Soccer League, this time for good. In 1983, he played for the league champion Jacksonville Tea Men which had jumped leagues from the NASL after the 1982 season. However, this was the last year for the American Soccer League as it folded at the end of the season and the Tea Men played in the United Soccer League in 1984. Ralbovsky then spent several years as a construction foreman and played for and coached Sloga of the amateur Gold Coast League. In 1988, Ralbovsky played one season Fort Lauderdale Strikers in the third American Soccer League.

== National team ==
That year, Ralbvosky also made his debut with the U.S. national team. He earned his first cap when he came on as a substitute in an October 3, 1976, scoreless tie with Mexico. He went on to play fifteen times with the national team, taking part in most of the team's games in 1977 and 1978.
