= Bob Scanlon (footballer) =

Scottish footballer

Personal information
- Date of birth: 2 June 1954 (age 72)
- Place of birth: Glasgow, Scotland
- Height: 5 ft 11 in (1.80 m)
- Position: Defender

Senior career*
| Years | Team | Apps | (Gls) |
| 1973–1975 | Boston Astros | | |
| 1976 | Boston Minutemen | 7 | (0) |
| 1976–1977 | Rhode Island/New England Oceaneers | | |
| 1978 | Indianapolis Daredevils | | |
- * Club domestic league appearances and goals

Robert Scanlon (born 2 June 1954) is a Scottish former professional footballer who played as a defender.

== Career ==
Born in Glasgow, Scanlon played in the United States for the Boston Astros, the Boston Minutemen, the Rhode Island/New England Oceaneers, and the Indianapolis Daredevils. He had first moved to the United States in 1972 as part of an exchange programme, organised by the Church of Scotland. He attended a boarding school in Massachusetts and decided to stay in the country to play soccer, returning to Scotland in 1979.
