= 1975 American Soccer League =

American Soccer League 1975 season
- Season: 1975
- Teams: 9
- Champions: New York Apollo (2nd title) and Boston Astros
- Premiers: New York Apollo (3rd title)
- Top goalscorer: José Neto (23)

Statistics of American Soccer League II in season 1975.

== League standings ==
Northern Division
Team	Pld	W	D	L	GF	GA	Pts
Boston Astros	20	9	8	3	51	31	26
Rhode Island Oceaneers	20	8	9	3	38	24	25
Connecticut Yankees	20	9	5	6	42	30	23

Source: rsssf.com

Eastern Division
Team	Pld	W	D	L	GF	GA	Pts
New York Apollo	20	11	6	3	42	33	28
New Jersey Brewers	20	6	3	11	27	41	15
Pittsburgh Miners	20	1	3	16	17	47	5

Source: rsssf.com

Midwestern Division
Team	Pld	W	D	L	GF	GA	Pts
Cleveland Cobras	20	10	3	7	39	45	23
Cincinnati Comets	20	7	4	9	38	33	18
Chicago Cats	20	7	3	10	29	45	17

Source: rsssf.com

== Playoffs ==
=== Bracket ===
Semifinals (2-match aggregate)
N1	Boston Astros	2	2	4
M1	Cleveland Cobras	2	1	3
E1	New York Apollo	0	1	1
N2	Rhode Island Oceaneers	0	0	0

ASL Championship Final (2-match aggregate)
N1	Boston Astros	2	1	3
E1	New York Apollo	2	1	3

=== Semifinals ===
Higher Seed	Aggregate	Lower Seed	First leg	Second leg	Attendance
Boston Astros	4–3	Cleveland Cobras	2–2	2–1	September 10 • George Finnie Stadium • ??? September 13 • Foley Stadium • ???
New York Apollo	1–0	Rhode Island Oceaneers	0–0	1–0 (5OT)	September 10 • Pierce Memorial Field • ??? September 13 • Memorial Stadium • ???

=== Championship ===
Higher Seed	Aggregate	Lower Seed	First leg	Second leg	Attendance
New York Apollo	3–3*	Boston Astros	2–2	1–1 (9OT)	September 17 • Foley Stadium • ??? September 20 • Memorial Stadium • 2,987

*Play suspended after 9 sudden-death overtimes; teams declared co-champions by commissioner Bob Cousy.
