= Joel Senior =

Joel Senior is the name of:

- Joel Senior (footballer, born 1987), Jamaican footballer
- Joel Senior (footballer, born 1999), English footballer
