= Baltimore Bays (disambiguation) =

The Baltimore Bays were a professional soccer team based in Baltimore, Maryland from 1967 to 1969.

Baltimore Bays may also refer to:

- Baltimore Bays (1972–73); member of the American Soccer League from 1972 to 1973
- Baltimore Bays (1993–98); member of United States International Soccer League from 1993 to 1998
- Maryland Bays; member of the American Soccer League/American Professional Soccer League from 1988 to 1991
