= Norm Demers =

American soccer player

Personal information
- Full name: Norman Demers
- Place of birth: United States
- Position: Defender

Senior career*
| Years | Team | Apps | (Gls) |
| 1978 | Fort Lauderdale Strikers | 1 | (0) |
| 1979 | Fort Lauderdale Saints | | |
| 1980 | Cleveland Cobras | | |
- * Club domestic league appearances and goals

Norm Demers is a retired U.S. professional soccer defender who spent one season in the North American Soccer League.

In 1978, Demers played for the Fort Lauderdale Strikers of the North American Soccer League. In 1979, he played for the Fort Lauderdale Saints of the Southern Soccer League. In 1980, he played for the Cleveland Cobras in the American Soccer League.
