= John Granville =

John Granville may refer to:

- John Granville (diplomat), American diplomat assassinated in Khartoum, Sudan
- John Granville, 1st Earl of Bath, English Royalist soldier and statesman
- John Granville, 1st Baron Granville of Potheridge, English soldier, landowner and politician
- John Granville (footballer), football goalkeeper from Trinidad and Tobago
