= Jack Howarth =

Jack Howarth may refer to:

- Jack Howarth (actor) (1896–1984), English actor
- Jack Howarth (footballer) (born 1945), English footballer
- Jack Howarth (rugby league) (born 2002), Australian rugby league footballer
