= Bob Scanlon =

Bob Scanlon refers to:

- Bob Scanlon (boxer) (1886–?), American boxer
- Bob Scanlon (footballer) (born 1954), Scottish footballer

== See also ==
- Robert Scanlan (disambiguation)
