= McGeady =

McGeady is a surname. Notable people with the surname include:

- Aiden McGeady (born 1986), professional footballer who currently plays for Everton and the Republic of Ireland internationally
- John McGeady (born 1958), Scottish footballer
- Mary Rose McGeady (1928–2012), American Roman Catholic nun and President of Covenant House from 1990 to 2003
- Michael McGeady (born 1978), Irish golfer
- Steven McGeady, former Intel executive best known as a witness in the Microsoft Antitrust Trial
