= Tom O'Dea (footballer) =

Irish footballer (1948–2025)

Personal information
- Date of birth: 20 November 1948
- Place of birth: Dublin, Ireland
- Date of death: October 2025 (aged 76)
- Height: 6 ft 0 in (1.83 m)
- Position: Centre-back

Youth career
- Home Farm

Senior career*
Years	Team	Apps	(Gls)
1970–1974	Shamrock Rovers		
1973	New Jersey Schaefer Brewers		
1975	Hartford Bicentennials	12	(0)
1975	Home Farm	2+	
1976	Utah Golden Spikers	11	(0)
1977–1979	New Jersey Americans	40+	(0)
Total		65+	(0)
- * Club domestic league appearances and goals

Tom O'Dea (20 November 1948 – October 2025) was an Irish professional footballer who played as a centre-back for Shamrock Rovers, Home Farm, New Jersey Schaefer Brewers (and for the later named New Jersey Americans), Hartford Bicentennials (later Connecticut Bicentennials) and Utah Golden Spikers (later Utah Pioneers) in the League of Ireland, North American Soccer League (NASL) and American Soccer League (ASL) respectively. He also coached after retiring from playing in 1979 for New Jersey Americans for the remainder of the year before the club relocated.

== Playing career ==
O'Dea began his senior career at Shamrock Rovers where he played for 5 seasons in the League of Ireland Premier Division between 1970 and 1974.

He played for New Jersey Schaefer Brewers in 1973, as well, due to the ASL playing a calendar season whilst the League of Ireland Premier Division played from August to May before the change in 2003. This allowed him to play during the summer whilst Shamrock Rovers did not have games.

After returning to the United States in 1975, O'Dea played for Hartford Bicentennials for one season where he appeared in 12 games in the NASL. At the club his shirt number was #13.

During 1975 he also returned to Home Farm where he played in the clubs short Cup Winners Cup campaign against Lens where they lost 7–1 on aggregate.

He later returned to the ASL in 1976, where he would remain until he retired, and played for Utah Golden Spikers (who were later re-branded to Utah Pioneers) where he appeared in 11 games for the club in the one season he was there. At the club his shirt number was #5.

O'Dea ended his playing career returning to New Jersey Americans. New Jersey Schaefer Brewers were renamed to New Jersey Americans before he rejoined. During his time as a player at the club, he appeared in roughly 40 matches however it is unknown how many games he played in the 1979 season. He was at the club when they won the 1977 ASL Playoff Championship Final 3-0 against Sacramento Gold (previously Sacramento Spirits). O'Dea's shirt numbers at the club were #17 (1977), #4 (1978) and #5 (1979).

== Post-playing career ==
O'Dea coached for New Jersey Americans in 1979. He did not relocate with the team to Miami where they became Miami Americans for the 1980 season.

== Death ==
O'Dea's death at the age of 76 was reported by the Irish Professional Footballers Benevolent Association on 11 October 2025.
