= Long Island PrimeTime =

- League: USBL 2006–2007
- Founded: 2006
- History: Long Island PrimeTime; 2006–2007
- Arena: Louis Armstrong Gymnasium
- Location: Flushing, New York
- Team colors: Green and white
- Head coach: James Ryans
- Ownership: United States Basketball League
- Championships: 0

The Long Island PrimeTime were a United States Basketball League team located in Flushing, New York. Their home court is currently the Louis Armstrong Gymnasium at the Elmcor Youth and Adult Activities Center. The head coach is currently James Ryans.

After postponing the first game of the season in 2007, the PrimeTime canceled their next game and on April 16 the league pulled them from the Schedule and franchise list. On April 17 the league released a statement and apology regarding their demise.

After the mid-season collapse of the Delaware Stars, the USBL reinstated the PrimeTime to play road games against the Albany Patroons and Brooklyn Kings for the rest of the 2007 season.
