= Telmo Pires =

American soccer player and coach

Personal information
- Date of birth: April 4, 1953 (age 73)
- Place of birth: Cacia, Portugal
- Position: Defender

Senior career*
Years	Team	Apps	(Gls)
1974–1975	Rhode Island Oceaneers		
1976	Hartford Bicentennials	11	(0)
1977–1978	New Jersey Americans		
1978–1979	Cincinnati Kids (indoor)	10	(0)
1979–1980	Hartford Hellions (indoor)	17	(2)

International career
1975	United States	1	(0)

Managerial career
- 1981: New England Sharks
- * Club domestic league appearances and goals

Telmo Pires (born April 4, 1953) is a retired soccer player professionally in the North American Soccer League, American Soccer League and Major Indoor Soccer League. Born in Portugal, he earned one cap with the United States men's national soccer team in 1975.

== Player ==
=== Youth ===
Pires grew up in Newark, New Jersey where he attended East Side High School. He was a three sport varsity letterman in soccer, baseball and basketball. When he was still in high school, he also played for the Newark Benfica. When he was seventeen, he scored three goals in Benfica's 5–1 victory over the New York Ukrainians in an indoor tournament held at the Elizabeth Armory. He attended Montclair State College.

=== Professional ===
In 1974, Pires began his professional career with the Rhode Island Oceaneers of the American Soccer League. He played two seasons in Rhode Island. In 1976, Pires played a single season in the North American Soccer League (NASL) with the Hartford Bicentennials. In 1977, he was with the New Jersey Americans in the ASL. That season, he scored nine goals in twenty-two games as the Americans took the ASL title with a win over the Sacramento Spirits in the championship game. Pires scored a goal in the 3–0 victory. Pires then spent two seasons in the Major Indoor Soccer League. In 1978–1979, he played for the Cincinnati Kids and in 1979–1980 for the Hartford Hellions.

=== National team ===
Pires earned one cap with the U.S. national team in a 4–0 loss to Poland on June 24, 1975. He also appeared with the U.S. Olympic soccer team as it attempted, but failed, to qualify for the 1976 Summer Olympics. However, Pires did score in a 4–2 loss to Mexico in the last qualification game on August 28, 1975. He also played on the 1975 U.S. Pan American Games soccer team.

== Coach ==
In March 1981, Pires was hired as the head coach of the New England Sharks of the American Soccer League.
