= Giesler =

Giesler is a surname and may refer to:

- Christian Giesler (born 1970), bass guitar player for Kreator
- Hermann Giesler (1898–1987), German architect
- Jerry Giesler (1886–1962), American lawyer
- Jon William Giesler (born 1956), American football playe
- Paul Giesler (1895–1945), German member of the NSDAP
- Walter John Giesler (1910–1976), American soccer player
