= Sularz =

Sularz is a Polish surname. Notable people with the surname include:

- Guy Sularz (born 1955), American baseball player
- Jerry Sularz (1937–2007), Polish soccer goalkeeper
