= 1971 American Soccer League =

American Soccer League 1971 season
- Season: 1971
- Teams: 5
- Champions: New York Greeks
- Top goalscorer: Charles Duccilli (11)

In the 1971 American Soccer League II, the New York Greeks were the champions. After the season, Virginia Capitol moved to Washington, and Syracuse folded.

== League standings ==
Pos	Team	Pld	W	D	L	GF	GA	Pts
1	New York Greeks	10	7	2	1	27	10	16
2	Boston Astros	10	6	2	2	26	9	14
3	Philadelphia Spartans	10	6	1	3	16	13	13
4	Syracuse Suns	10	3	0	7	17	38	6
5	Virginia Capitol Cavaliers	10	1	1	8	17	33	3

Error in table: 23 total wins != 21 total losses
