= Meehl =

Meehl is a surname. Notable people with the surname include:

- Brian Meehl (born 1952), American puppeteer and writer
- Cindy Meehl, American documentary filmmaker
- Gerald Meehl (born 1951), American climate scientist
- Lew Meehl (born 1946), American soccer player and coach
- Paul E. Meehl (1920–2003), American psychologist
- Sid Meehl (1914–1986), Australian rules footballer
