= 1973 National Amateur Cup =

Tournament details
- Country: United States
- Teams: 31

Final positions
- Champions: Philadelphia Inter (1st title)
- Runners-up: San Jose Grenadiers
- Semifinalists: Chicago Kickers; Peabody Academica

The 1973 National Amateur Cup was the 49th annual edition of the national tournament open to amateur soccer teams affiliated with the United States Soccer Football Association.

Philadelphia Inter defeated the San Jose Grenadiers, 3–0, in the final.

== Eastern Division ==
First round
Philadelphia Inter | 4
German American Kickers | 0
UASC Dnipro | 1
Pan-American Union | 0
Inter Italian | 9
Rochester Colo-Colo | 3
Carpathia Kickers | 1
Canonsburg | 0
Peabody Academica | 4
New Hampshire Hellenic | 1
White Plains | 3
Greek American Reserve | 2
Association Academica | 2
Fall River Sports | 1
Hartford Italians | 1
Connecticut Wildcats | 0

Second round
Philadelphia Inter | 4
UASC Dnipro | 3
Inter Italian | 1
Carpathia Kickers | 0
Peabody Academica | 4
White Plains | 3
Association Academica | 3
Hartford Italians | 2

Semi-finals
Philadelphia Inter | 4
Inter Italian | 2
Peabody Academica | 3
Association Academica | 0

Final
Philadelphia Inter | 6
Peabody Academica | 2

== Western Division ==
First round
San Jose Grenadiers | 1
Davis UC | 0
Heidelberg SC | 6
Boeing Employees | 1
DSV Danubia | 4
Thunder Chickens | 1
Alemania 69 | 2
Sparta SC | 1
Chicago Kickers | 3
Old Milwaukee Brewers | 1
Denver Kickers | 1
Minnesota Kickers | 0
St. Louis Busch | 2
Seven-Up SC | 0
Heart of America

Second round
San Jose Grenadiers | 2
Heidelberg SC | 1
DSV Danubia | 7
Alemania 69 | 6
Chicago Kickers | 6
Denver Kickers | 1
St. Louis Busch | 1
Heart of America | 0

Semi-finals
San Jose Grenadiers | 7
DSV Danubia | 0
Chicago Kickers | 3
St. Louis Busch | 0

Final
San Jose Grenadiers | 2
Chicago Kickers | 1

== Grand final ==
July 1, 1973
5:00PM

| Philadelphia Inter (PA) | 3–0 | San Jose Grenadiers (CA) |
|---|---|---|
| 44' Hector Nietto(Michael DiSandro); 60' Dale Russell; 80' Nietto(Elston Seale) |

Veterans Stadium Philadelphia
Attendance: 300

== See also ==
- 1973 National Challenge Cup
