= Luxbacher =

Luxbacher is a surname. Notable people with the surname include:

- Bernhard Luxbacher (born 1994), Austrian football player
- Daniel Luxbacher (born 1992), Austrian football player
- Irene Luxbacher (born 1970), Canadian artist and author
- Joe Luxbacher (born 1951), American football player
