= Utah Pioneers =

Utah pioneers may refer to:

- The Utah Golden Spikers, a soccer club known as the Utah Pioneers in later times
- Mormon pioneers, a large group of European-American settlers of Utah
