= 1973 National Challenge Cup =

- Dewar Challenge Cup

Tournament details
- Country: United States

Final positions
- Champions: Maccabee AC
- Runners-up: Inter-Italian
- 1974 CONCACAF Champions' Cup: Maccabee AC

The 1973 National Challenge Cup was the 60th annual national open soccer championship held by the United States Soccer Football Association now known as the Lamar Hunt U.S. Open Cup.

== Eastern Division ==
First round
December 24 - New York
Greek American AA	2
Doxa SC	1
November 26 - Long Island
NY Hota SC	1
German Hungarian	0
April 1 - Fall River
Fall River SC	0
Boston Astros	5
December 3 - Hartford
Hartford Hellenic	3
New Haven City	2
February 11 - Cleveland
Inter-Italian	4
Inter Hope	1
March 25
Canonsburg	3
Cincinnati Kolping	0
February 25 - North Bergen
Dalmatinac SC	0
Ukrainian Nationals	2
February 26 - Baltimore
Tower Ford Casa Bianca	0(4)
Washington Internationals	0(0)

Second round
March 4 - New York
Greek American AA	2
NY Hota SC	1
April 8 - Boston
Boston Astros	2
Hartford Hellenic	1
April 8 - Cleveland
Inter-Italian	4
Canonsburg	2
March 11
Ukrainian Nationals	4
Tower Ford Casa Bianca	2

Semi-finals
May 6
Greek American AA	2
Boston Astros	0
April 28 - Berea
Inter-Italian	3
Ukrainian Nationals	0

Final
May 27 - New York
Greek American AA	1
Inter-Italian	3

== Western Division ==
First round
February 18 - San Francisco
San Jose Portuguese	1
SF Greek American	0
February 11 - Seattle
Olympia Olys	4
Rainier Brewers	1
March 4 - Los Angeles
Maccabee AC	1
St. Stephens	0
March 4 - Los Angeles
Yugoslav American	2
Montebello Homenetmen	1
May 6 - Chicago
Croatian SC	2
UASC Lions	1
April 15 - Milwaukee
Bavarian Blue Ribbon	8
Minneapolis Polonia	0
Denver Kickers	6
Tulsa International	0
March 18 - St. Louis
Kutis S.C.	4
Big Four Chevrolet SC	0

Second round
February 25 - San Jose
San Jose Portuguese	4
Olympia Olys	2
March 11 - San Pedro
Maccabee AC	1
Yugoslav American	0
May 13
Croatian SC	3
Bavarian SC	2
April 29 - Denver
Denver Kickers	3
Kutis S.C.	2

Semi-finals
March 25/April 8 - SJ/LA
San Jose Portuguese	0-0
Maccabee AC	1-2
May 20
Croatian SC	2
Denver Kickers	0

Final
May 27 - Los Angeles
Maccabee AC	1
Croatian SC	0

== Grand final ==
June 10, 1973
2:00 PM PST

Maccabee AC (CA)	5–3	Inter-Italian (OH)
Hans Gudegast 13' (pen.) unknown 41'; Yaron Schnitman 103', 113'; Fesseha Emmanuel	report 1 report 2	Roman Rosul 35', (red card) 85'; Vito Iozzo 78' (Rosul); Jim McMillan 98'

Rancho La Cienga Stadium; Los Angeles

== See also ==
- 1973 National Amateur Cup
