= 1973 American Soccer League =

American Soccer League 1973 season
- Season: 1973
- Teams: 12
- Champions: New York Apollo (2nd title)
- Premiers: New York Apollo (2nd title) & Cincinnati Comets
- Top goalscorer: Eddy Roberts (12)

Statistics of the American Soccer League II for the 1973 season.

== League standings ==
Northern Conference
Team	Pld	W	D	L	GF	GA	Pts
New York Apollo	14	10	0	4	46	15	20
Connecticut Wildcats	14	8	3	3	28	21	19
Boston Astros	14	8	1	5	26	20	17
Syracuse Suns	14	1	0	13	18	55	2

Mid-Atlantic Conference
Team	Pld	W	D	L	GF	GA	Pts
Baltimore Bays	14	7	2	5	31	25	16
New Jersey Brewers	14	5	5	4	31	23	15
Delaware Wings	14	5	2	7	22	25	12
Philadelphia Spartans	14	4	3	7	22	29	11

Midwest Conference
Team	Pld	W	D	L	GF	GA	Pts
Cincinnati Comets	12	10	0	2	46	15	20
Cleveland Stars	12	8	2	2	56	22	18
Gary Tigers	12	3	2	7	24	48	8
Detroit Mustangs	12	0	2	10	16	57	2

== Playoffs ==
=== Bracket ===
Semifinals; September 2–3
1a	New York Apollo	2
4	Baltimore Bays	0
1b	Cincinnati Comets	4
3	Cleveland Stars	0

ASL Final; September 8
1a	New York Apollo	1
1b	Cincinnati Comets	0

=== Semifinals ===
September 2	Cincinnati Comets	4–0	Cleveland Stars	St. Xavier Stadium • Att. ???

September 3	New York Apollo	2–0	Baltimore Bays	Metropolitan Oval • Att. ???

=== Final ===
September 8, 1973

New York Apollo (NY)	1–0(OT)	Cincinnati Comets (OH)
Tony Francillo 105'	Report

Metropolitan Oval, Queens, New York
Attendance: 5,000
Referee: (USA)
