= Jim Kabia =

English footballer

Personal information
- Full name: James Paul Kabia
- Date of birth: 11 November 1954 (age 71)
- Place of birth: Mansfield, England
- Position: Forward

Senior career*
Years	Team	Apps	(Gls)
1972–1974	Chesterfield	10	(1)
1974–1981	Boston United	240	(101)
1977	→ Santa Barbara Condors (loan)		
1982	Stafford Rangers		
1982–1984	King's Lynn		
1984–1985	Burton Albion	49	(11)
1985–1986	Kettering Town		
1987–1988	Boston United	20	(3)
1987	→ Nuneaton Town (loan)		
- Gainsborough Trinity
- Holbeach United
- Spalding United
1989–1990	King's Lynn		
Total		270+	(105+)

Managerial career
- 1989–1990: King's Lynn (player-manager)
- 1990: Boston Town
- * Club domestic league appearances and goals

James Paul Kabia (born 11 November 1954) is an English former footballer who played in the Football League for Chesterfield in 1972. He also played in the United States with the Santa Barbara Condors in the American Soccer League, before returning to England to play in the lower leagues. He is the older brother of fellow professional footballer Jason Kabia.

== Career statistics ==
=== Club ===
As of 1988.

Appearances and goals by lub, season and competition
Club	Season	League			FA Cup		League Cup		FA Trophy		Other		Total	
Club	Season	Division	Apps	Goals	Apps	Goals	Apps	Goals	Apps	Goals	Apps	Goals	Apps	Goals
Chesterfield	1971–72	Third Division	10	1	0	0	0	0	0	0	0	0	10	1
Chesterfield	1972–73	Third Division	0	0	0	0	0	0	0	0	0	0	0	0
Chesterfield	1973–74	Third Division	0	0	0	0	0	0	0	0	0	0	0	0
Chesterfield	Total		10	1	0	0	0	0	0	0	0	0	10	1
Boston United	1974–75	Northern Premier League	32	13	2	0	1	0	2	0	2	0	39	13
Boston United	1975–76	Northern Premier League	44	26	2	0	8	7	2	0	2 (Note: One appearance and no goals in the Lincolnshire Senior Cup)	1	58	34
Boston United	1976–77	Northern Premier League	33	12	1	0	1	0	2	0	4	2	41	14
Boston United	1977–78	Northern Premier League	43	20	1	0	5	3	2	2	5	2	56	30
Boston United	1978–79	Northern Premier League	43	14	7	3	3	1	3	3	6	1	62	22
Boston United	1979–80	Alliance Premier League	21	5	5	4	2	0	3	1	1	0	32	10
Boston United	1980–81	Alliance Premier League	24	11	5	2	2	0	2	1	2	0	35	14
Boston United	Total		240	101	23	9	22	11	16	7	22	6	323	134
Boston United	1986–87	Football Conference	9	1	0	0	0	0	0	0	1	0	10	1
Boston United	1987–88	Football Conference	11	2	1	0	0	0	0	0	1	0	13	2
Boston United	Total		20	3	1	0	0	0	0	0	1	0	23	3
Career total			250	105	24	9	22	11	16	7	23	6	356	138
