= Tom O'Dea =

Tom O'Dea may refer to:

- Tom O'Dea (footballer) (1948–2025), Irish footballer
- Tom O'Dea (politician) (born 1967), American politician

== See also ==
- Thomas O'Dea (1858–1923), Irish Catholic bishop
