= Jorge Suárez (footballer) =

Salvadoran footballer (1945–1997)

Personal information
- Full name: Jorge Suárez Landaverde
- Date of birth: 17 April 1945
- Place of birth: Metapán, El Salvador
- Date of death: 12 January 1997 (aged 51)
- Place of death: El Salvador
- Position: Goalkeeper

Youth career
- Atlético Fuentes

Senior career*
Years	Team	Apps	(Gls)
1962–1966	Isidro Menéndez		
1966–1970	Sonsonate		
1970–1971	Atlante		
1971–1973	FAS		
1974	Indiana Tigers		
1974	San Miguel		
1974–1975	FAS		
1975–1978	Once Municipal		
1978–1979	Águila		
1979–1981	Xelajú MC		
1981–1982	Once Lobos		
1984–1986	CESSA		

International career
- El Salvador

Managerial career
- 1987–1989: Isidro Metapán
- * Club domestic league appearances and goals

This is about the football player. For the Puerto Rican politician, see Jorge Suárez Cáceres.

Jorge Suárez Landaverde (17 April 1945 – 12 January 1997) was a Salvadoran footballer who played as a goalkeeper.

== Club career ==
Nicknamed El Calero, he is considered to be one of the best goalkeepers El Salvador has ever produced.

He played for several clubs in El Salvador and made his debut at the highest level with FAS in 1972.

The Estadio Jorge Calero Suárez was named after him on 27 September 1996, just three months prior to his death, to cancer.

== Honours ==
Xelajú MC

- Liga Guate: 1980
