= George Taratsides =

Greek-American soccer player

Personal information
- Place of birth: Greece
- Positions: Forward; goalkeeper

Youth career
- 1970–1973: Maryland Terrapins

Senior career*
Years	Team	Apps	(Gls)
1974–1975	Washington Diplomats	6	(0)
–1981	New York United	24	(0)
1982–1983	Pennsylvania Stoners	18	(0)
1982–1983	Pittsburgh Spirit (indoor)	2	(0)
- * Club domestic league appearances and goals

George Taratsides is a retired Greek-American soccer goalkeeper who played professionally in the North American Soccer League, American Soccer League and Major Indoor Soccer League.

Taratsides attended the University of Maryland where he played on the men's soccer team from 1970 to 1973. In 1971, he spent the season at forward, leading the team with ten goals. He then played the 1972 and 1973 season in goal. He was a 1972 Second Team and a 1973 Honorable Mention (third team) All American. In 1974, he turned professional with the Washington Diplomats of the North American Soccer League. In 1981, he played for New York United in the American Soccer League. He was a first team All Star that season. IN 1982, he moved to the Pennsylvania Stoners. He continued to play for the Stoners through the 1983 season. He also played one season, 1982–1983, with the Pittsburgh Spirit of Major Indoor Soccer League.

He was inducted into the Maryland Soccer Hall of Fame in 1997.

George graduated from Howard University and has been a physical therapist and certified athletic trainer for the past 20 years practicing in Baltimore, Maryland.

== Yearly Awards ==
- ASL All-Star Team: 1981

ASL All- star Team : 1980
