= Steve Reid (soccer) =

Canadian-American soccer player

Personal information
- Date of birth: April 6, 1955 (age 71)
- Place of birth: Montreal, Quebec, Canada
- Height: 5 ft 8 in (1.73 m)
- Positions: Midfielder; forward

Youth career
- 1974: Mercer County Community College

Senior career*
| Years | Team | Apps | (Gls) |
| 1977–1978 | New Jersey Americans | 26 | (8) |
| 1979 | New England Tea Men | 14 | (1) |
| 1979–1980 | New England Tea Men (indoor) | 12 | (6) |
| 1979–1982 | Philadelphia Fever (indoor) | | |
| 1980 | Philadelphia Fury | 14 | (1) |
| 1981 | New England Sharks | | |
- * Club domestic league appearances and goals

Steve Reid (born April 6, 1955) is a retired Canadian-American football (soccer) player who played professionally in the American Soccer League, North American Soccer League and Major Indoor Soccer League.

Reid attended Mercer County Community College where he was a 1974 NJCAA First Team All American soccer player. In 1977 and 1978, Reid played for the New Jersey Americans of the American Soccer League. In 1979, he moved to the New England Tea Men of the North American Soccer League. He began the 1979-1980 indoor season with the Tea Men before being traded to the Philadelphia Fever of the Major Indoor Soccer League. He remained with the Fever until 1981. In 1980, Reid also played for the Philadelphia Fury of the NASL. In 1981, he played for the New England Sharks of the ASL.
