= Lew Meehl =

American soccer player (born 1946)

Personal information
- Full name: Jacob Louis Meehl
- Date of birth: August 4, 1946 (age 80)
- Place of birth: Philadelphia, Pennsylvania, U.S.
- Height: 5 ft 8 in (1.73 m)
- Position: Midfielder

Youth career
- 1965–1967: Temple Owls

Senior career*
Years	Team	Apps	(Gls)
1969–1972	Philadelphia Spartans		
1973–1974	Philadelphia Atoms	16	(0)
1975	Pittsburgh Miners		
1976	New Jersey Americans		
1978–1979	Philadelphia Fever (indoor)	7	(0)

Managerial career
- 1978–1979: Philadelphia Fever (assistant)
- –1981: Philadelphia Bayern
- 1982–1983: Princeton Tigers (assistant)
- 1984–1992: Philadelphia Textile
- 1993–2009: Drexel Dragons
- * Club domestic league appearances and goals

Jacob Meehl (born August 4, 1946) is an American retired soccer midfielder who played in the North American Soccer League, Major Indoor Soccer League and American Soccer League. He coached at the collegiate level for 26 years before retiring in 2009.

== Player ==
=== Youth ===
In 1964, Meehl graduated from Frankford High School where he played both soccer and baseball. He attended Temple University where he played on the soccer team from 1965 to 1967. He was a 1965 and 1966 Honorable Mention (third team) and 1967 First Team All American. He graduated in 1969 and was inducted into the Temple Owls Hall of Fame in 1986.

=== Professional ===
In 1969, Meehl signed with the Philadelphia Spartans of the American Soccer League. In 1973, he moved to the Philadelphia Atoms of the North American Soccer League where he was part of the 1973 NASL championship team. He returned to the ASL in 1975 with the Pittsburgh Miners and the New Jersey Americans in 1976. In 1978, he joined the Philadelphia Fever of the Major Indoor Soccer League for one season.

== Coach ==
Meehl served as an assistant coach with the Philadelphia Fever during the 1978–1979 MISL season. In 1981, Meehl coached Philadelphia Bayern to the finals of the National Amateur Cup. he became an assistant coach with the Princeton Tigers men's soccer team in 1982. In 1984, he was hired as head coach of the men's soccer team by Philadelphia College of Textiles. In 1993, he left Philadelphia Textile after compiling a 103–52–23 record. That year, he became the head coach at Drexel University. He resigned as head coach on December 31, 2009. He compiled a 133–150–31 record over 17 seasons. In 2001, he retired after 32 years as a health and physical education teacher at Bensalem High School.
