= Skip Roderick =

American soccer player

Personal information
- Full name: Arthur D. Roderick
- Place of birth: Springfield, Pennsylvania, U.S.
- Date of death: September 8, 2026 (aged 60)
- Height: 5 ft 10 in (1.78 m)
- Position: Midfielder

College career
Years	Team	Apps	(Gls)
1970–1973	Elizabethtown Blue Jays		

Senior career*
Years	Team	Apps	(Gls)
1974	Philadelphia Atoms	5	(0)
1975	Pittsburgh Miners		
1976	New Jersey Americans	18	(1)
1976–1977	Sligo Rovers		
1977–1978	New Jersey Americans	35	(0)
1978–1980	Philadelphia Fever (indoor)	28	(1)
1979	New Jersey Americans	24	(0)

Managerial career
- 1981: Philadelphia Fever (interim)
- 1982: Philadelphia Fever (interim)
- 1983–2023: Elizabethtown Blue Jays
- 2015–2016: Ocean City Nor'easters (assistant)
- 2021: Ocean City Nor'easters (assistant)
- * Club domestic league appearances and goals

Arthur D. "Skip" Roderick was an American retired soccer player who played professionally in the North American Soccer League, Major Indoor Soccer League and the American Soccer League. He was the head coach of the NCAA Division III Elizabethtown College men's soccer team.

== Playing career ==
As a youth, Roderick had played for the Delco youth club. He attended Elizabethtown College, graduating in 1974. In 1974, he played a single season with the Philadelphia Atoms of the North American Soccer League. The Atoms released him during the off-season and although he received an offer from the Portland Timbers, he signed with the Pittsburgh Miners of the American Soccer League instead. In 1976, he moved to the New Jersey Americans for a single season.

Roderick signed for Sligo Rovers in the League of Ireland in December 1976 .

He returned to the United States to play the 1977 season with the New Jersey Americans. He played two seasons (1978–1980) with the Philadelphia Fever of the Major Indoor Soccer League. Roderick also played for the Philadelphia Ukrainians and Elizabeth S.C. in the German American Soccer League.

== Coaching career ==
Roderick became interim head coach of the Philadelphia Fever for the last three games of the 1980–1981 season. In February 1982, the Philadelphia Fever fired head coach Walter Chyzowych and elevated Roderick to interim head coach.

In 1983, Roderick returned to Elizabethtown College to become head coach of the college's soccer team. In 1989, Skip coached the Blue Jays to the NCAA Division III title. Roderick was often offered positions at larger schools, UVA for example, but always stayed with his alma mater. Coach Roderick also maintains Elizabethtown Soccer Camp, the longest running soccer day camp in the United States. Roderick was awarded the 2015 George W. Kirchner Award for his leadership and contribution to athletics in Lancaster County, Pennsylvania. On October 24, 2015, Roderick recorded his 500th victory for the Blue Jays, becoming only the 7th DIII coach and 12th in all divisions to reach the milestone, with a 3–0 drubbing against Drew University.
