= Vito Colonna =

Italian-American soccer player and coach

Personal information
- Place of birth: Italy

College career
Years	Team	Apps	(Gls)
1968–1971	Cleveland State Vikings		

Senior career*
Years	Team	Apps	(Gls)
1972–1978	Cleveland Cobras		
1981	Cleveland Cobras		

Managerial career
- 1981: Cleveland Cobras
- * Club domestic league appearances and goals

Vito Colonna (born in Italy) is a retired Italian-American soccer player and coach. He played at least ten seasons in the American Soccer League and coached for at least one.

Colonna attended Cleveland State University, playing on the soccer team from 1968 to 1971. By the end of his four seasons with the Vikings, he had marked himself indelibly in the Cleveland State record books. He holds over a dozen records including the school's career scoring record of 65 goals. He holds the seasons scoring record with 22 goals and is third on the all-time assists list with 33. His junior season, Colonna was selected as an Honorable Mention (third team) All American. He was inducted into the Cleveland State Athletic Hall of Fame on February 6, 1983. In 1972, Colonna signed with the Cleveland Stars, an expansion team in the American Soccer League. In 1974, the team came under new ownership which renamed it the Cobras. Colonna remained with the team until 1978. In 1981, he returned for one season as a player coach. At the end of the season, the Cobras folded. During the mid-1970s, Colonna was a consistent goal scoring threat. In 1975, he led the team in scoring with fifteen goals, placing him third on the league's goals list. In 1976, he scored nine and in 1977, added ten more, tying for sixth place in the league.
