= Central Delaware SA Future =

- Full name: Central Delaware SA Future
- Nickname: CDSA
- Founded: 2005
- League: Women's Premier Soccer League
Home colors	Away colors

The Central Delaware SA Future was a North American professional soccer team based in Dover, Delaware. Founded in 2005, the team played in Women's Premier Soccer League (WPSL), a national amateur league at the third tier of the American Soccer Pyramid. The team ceased operation after the 2010 season.

Central Delaware SA Future's home was Wolverine Stadium, located on the campus of Wesley College in the city of Dover. Central Delaware SA Future was a former sister club to the defunct Delaware Dynasty of the USL Premier Development League.

== Year-by-year ==
Year	Division	League	Reg. season	Playoffs
2006	3	WPSL	6th, East South	
2007	3	WPSL	5th, East Mid-Atlantic	Did not qualify
2008	3	WPSL	7th, East Mid-Atlantic	Did not qualify

== Head coaches ==
- (Republic of Ireland) Seamus O'Connor (2007)
- (England) Wayne Grocott (2008–present)

== Home stadiums ==
- Wolverine Stadium (2005–present)

== See also ==
- Delaware Dynasty
- Delaware Wings
- Delaware Wizards
- List of professional sports teams in Delaware
