= Keith Walley =

English footballer

Personal information
- Full name: Keith John Walley
- Date of birth: 19 October 1954 (age 72)
- Place of birth: Weymouth, England
- Position: Midfielder

Senior career*
Years	Team	Apps	(Gls)
1973–1974	Crystal Palace	7	(1)
1974–1975	Weymouth	?	(7)
1975–1976	Chelmsford City	5	(0)
1978	Southern California Lazers	23	(8)
1978	California Surf	2	(0)
1979-80	California Sunshine	?	(?)
1979-80	Hartford Hellions (indoor)	12	(1)
- * Club domestic league appearances and goals

Keith John Walley (born 19 October 1954 in Weymouth, Dorset) is an English former professional footballer who played as a midfielder in the Football League, American Soccer League, North American Soccer League, and Major Indoor Soccer League.
