= Jerry Sularz =

Polish footballer (1942–2007)

Personal information
- Full name: Bronisław K. Sularz
- Date of birth: January 27, 1942
- Place of birth: Wałbrzych, Poland
- Date of death: August 29, 2007 (aged 65)
- Place of death: West Milford, New Jersey, United States
- Height: 6 ft 0 in (1.83 m)
- Position: Goalkeeper

College career
Years	Team	Apps	(Gls)
1964–67	Vanderbilt Commodores		

Senior career*
Years	Team	Apps	(Gls)
1967–1973	Gornik Wałbrzych		(0)
1973–1975	New York Cosmos	32	(0)
1976	Boston Minutemen	7	(0)
1976	Connecticut Yankees		
1977–1978	New Jersey Americans	35	(0)
- * Club domestic league appearances and goals

Bronisław "Jerry" Sularz (January 27, 1942, in Wałbrzych, Poland – August 29, 2007, in West Milford, New Jersey) was a Polish football (soccer) goalkeeper who spent four seasons in the North American Soccer League, at least two in the American Soccer League and six in Poland.

Sularz began his career in Poland, playing with for Górnik Wałbrzych. In 1973, he moved to New York Cosmos of the North American Soccer League. He remained with the team through the 1975 season before spending 1976 with the Boston Minutemen. In 1977, he moved to the New Jersey Americans of the American Soccer League. He later played for Garfield Vistula and the Hoboken Travelers, an over-40 team.
