= Karl Schellscheidt =

Karl Schellscheidt is an American soccer player, educator and entrepreneur. He was born on April 28, 1968, and was raised in Union, New Jersey. He is the son of soccer coach and player Manfred "Manny" Schellschedit. Karl attended Roselle Catholic High School and graduated in 1986.

== Soccer ==
In the fall of 1986, Karl began attending Princeton University and while there he played soccer for the Princeton Tigers. Karl was a letter winner from the 1986 through the 1989 seasons. In 1986 Karl received honorable mention from the All-Ivy League, in 1988 he made the All-Ivy League Second Team and in 1989 he made the All-Ivy League First Team. In 1989 Karl was awarded The David S. Hackett Memorial Soccer Cup (MVP) which is awarded annually to the member of the Princeton soccer team whose enthusiasm, discipline and leadership contributed most to the team and the sport of soccer at Princeton. He was also the co-captain of the men's soccer team in 1988 and 1989. After graduating Princeton University with a BSE in Civil Engineering, Karl decided that he did not want to be an engineer. Instead he went to Germany where he played semi-professional soccer. A serious injury to his left heel forced Schellscheidt to quit playing soccer in Germany. During the summer of 1994 when the United States hosted the World Cup of soccer, Karl enjoyed a brief stint as a liaison for the German team, as Karl speaks German. Of his experience as a team liaison he stated "That was a great month of my life." In 1994 when Schellscheidt went to teach math at the Hun School in Princeton, he was also the assistant soccer coach.

Karl played the part of a soccer referee in the 2007 Davis Guggenheim film Gracie. The film is about a teenage girl in the late 1970s who tries out and plays for the varsity all-boy soccer team at her local high school. The film takes place in Karl's home state of New Jersey, and is loosely based on the childhood experiences of actress Elisabeth Shue.

== Educator and entrepreneur ==
In 1993 Karl graduated from Seton Hall University with a master's degree in Secondary Education. After graduating graduate school Karl served as an Environmental Science Instructor for the Office of Continuing Education at Rutgers University. During his time there, Schellscheidt had the opportunity to work with troubled youth who had already run afoul of the law and had been turned off by public schools. In 1994 Schellscheidt began teaching math at the Hun School of Princeton, which he did for the next three years. Looking for more of an intellectual challenge, Karl enrolled in the University of Pennsylvania Law School and graduated in 2000. Until 2002 Karl worked as a lawyer for the prestigious law firm Dechert LLP, but he found the demands of corporate law to be incompatible with spending time with his family and tutoring so he decided to return to educating and tutoring while also doing some legal work. The flexibility worked well with his family life. In 2005 Karl founded ePrep along with fellow Princeton University graduate Eric Barnes. While surveying the current landscape for test prep services, Karl focused in on a critical discovery - that the traditional test prep market had become stagnant, complacent and mechanical in its approach to teaching over the past twenty years. Aside from being the co-founder of ePrep, Karl is also the president and CEO.
