= Mohammad Attiah =

Ghanaian footballer

Personal information
- Date of birth: February 15, 1950 (age 76)
- Place of birth: Accra, Ghana
- Position: Forward

Senior career*
Years	Team	Apps	(Gls)
1973–1974	Dallas Tornado	3	(1)
1975–1977	Rhode Island Oceaneers		
1978–1981	Cleveland Force (indoor)	37	(14)
1979	Cleveland Cobras		
- * Club domestic league appearances and goals

Mohammad "Baby Jet" Attiah is a retired Ghanaian professional football (soccer) forward. He played two seasons in the North American Soccer League.

In 1966, Attiah began his professional career in Ghana as a sixteen-year-old. He left Ghana in 1970 to play in Nigeria. In 1973, the Dallas Tornado of the North American Soccer League brought him to the United States. He played two seasons in Dallas. In 1975, he played for the Rhode Island Oceaneers of the American Soccer League. He played for the team through the 1977 season when the team was known as the New England Oceaneers. He then played for the Cleveland Force of the Major Indoor Soccer League for three seasons. He retired in 1981.

In 1984, he became the director of public relations for the Canton Invaders of the American Indoor Soccer Association.
