= Delaware Dynasty =

- Full name: Delaware Dynasty
- Nickname: The Dynasty
- Founded: 2006
- Ground: Kirkwood Soccer Complex
- Capacity: 1,000
- Chairman: (United States) Ahmed El-Kadars
- Manager: (United States) Matt Okoh
- League: USL Premier Development League
- 2007: 8th, Mid Atlantic Division
Home colours	Away colours

Delaware Dynasty was an American soccer team, founded in 2006. The team was a member of the United Soccer Leagues Premier Development League (PDL), the fourth tier of the American Soccer Pyramid, until 2007, when the team left the league and the franchise was terminated.

The team played its home games at the Kirkwood Soccer Complex in New Castle, Delaware, around 8 miles south of the state's largest city, Wilmington. The team's colors were white and black.

== Final Squad ==
vs Hampton Roads Piranhas, 20 July 2007 Note: Flags indicate national team as defined under FIFA eligibility rules; some limited exceptions apply. Players may hold more than one non-FIFA nationality.

No.	Pos.	Nation	Player
0	GK	USA	Kevin Nuss
4	DF	USA	Daniel Lundquist
5	MF	USA	Lamar Hyde
6	MF	HAI	Emile Innocent
7	MF	JAM	Joel Senior
8	DF	USA	Michael Lodge
12	MF	NGA	Oluwafemi Badejo
13	FW	USA	William Brown

No.	Pos.	Nation	Player
15	DF	USA	Douglas Schmitt
16	MF	USA	Averil Ringheim
20	MF	USA	Gerald Quedenfeld
22	DF	JAM	Carlington Harvey
24	MF	USA	Michael Zoellner
25	DF	BRB	Daryl Ferguson
31	MF	NGA	Cyril Morka

== Year-by-year ==
Year	Division	League	Regular season	Playoffs	Open Cup
2006	4	USL PDL	4th, Northeast	Did not qualify	Did not qualify
2007	4	USL PDL	8th, Mid Atlantic	Did not qualify	Did not qualify

== Competition history ==
Delaware Dynasty entered the PDL in 2006 as an expansion franchise under head coach Matt Okoh. Things began superbly for the new boys, enjoying a comprehensive 5–1 victory over Vermont Voltage on the opening day of the season that featured a hat trick from Nigerian striker Oluwafemi Badejo; unfortunately for Delaware, things never carried on from this auspicious opening. They lost four of their next five matches (including a 7–2 hammering at the hands of the Rhode Island Stingrays), and struggled to regain their form for much of the rest of the season. They beat Westchester Flames 3–2 at home in early June, and enjoyed a 3–2 revenge win over Rhode Island shortly thereafter, but finished the season with five losses in their final seven games, including a 3–1 defeat on the road at Reading Rage, and a hard-fought 3–2 defeat to Vermont on the final day of the season which gave the New Englanders recompense for their opening-day humiliation. Dynasty finished their freshman year fourth in the Northeast Division, fourteen points behind divisional champions Westchester, and well out of the playoffs. Michael Crowley and Mkokheli Dube were Delaware's top scorers with four goals each – Dube's coming in just five appearances – while South African midfielder Vuyisani Nyandeni contributed 3 assists.

Unfortunately for Delaware, 2007 was even worse than 2006; the team managed just three wins all year – 3–1 over Reading Rage, 2–0 over Richmond Kickers Future, and 4–1 over West Virginia Chaos. This was as good as it got for Dynasty, who had begun the year with a 5-game winless streak. They threw away a 2-goal lead in their 3–3 tie with West Virginia Chaos in early June, and suffered several heavy defeats to stronger opposition towards the season's end, including a 5–2 on the road at Williamsburg Legacy, a 3–1 loss to Ocean City Barons, and a humiliating 7–1 annihilation at the hands of the Hampton Roads Piranhas on the final day of the season in what turned out to be the franchise's last ever game. Dynasty finished 7th in the Mid Atlantic Division, one of the three whipping boys of the division, and only ahead of Northern Virginia Royals and West Virginia by one point and goal difference. Oluwafemi Badejo was the team's top scorer, with 6 goals, while Guilherme Fonseca contributed 5 goals and a team-leading 3 assists. Following the conclusion of the 2007 season the club folded, and left the PDL.

== Coaches ==
- (United States) Matt Okoh 2006–07

== Stadia ==
- Kirkwood Soccer Complex, New Castle, Delaware 2006–12

== Average attendance ==
- 2007: 87
- 2006: 312

== See also ==
- Central Delaware SA Future
- Delaware Wings
- Delaware Wizards
- List of professional sports teams in Delaware
