= Sid Wallace =

English footballer

Personal information
- Date of birth: 30 May 1957
- Place of birth: Wigan, England
- Position: Striker

Youth career
- –1975: Everton

Senior career*
Years	Team	Apps	(Gls)
1975–1980	Waterford United	112	(52)
1976	Utah Golden Spikers		
1977	Windsor Stars	24	(25)
1978	Southern California Lazers	24	(14)
1979	Cleveland Cobras		

International career
1977	League of Ireland XI	2	(0)
- * Club domestic league appearances and goals

Sid Wallace (born 30 May 1957) was an English footballer who played as a striker, most famously for Waterford United.

== Career ==
Wallace's first competitive match was a rugby league one, playing for Greenburg Street in the Wigan Amateur league, where he remained for four years before switching codes to the round ball. He signed for Everton Youths, where his teammates included Cliff Marshall (the Toffees' first ever black player) and Dave Jones. He also recalled Bob Latchford as the star at the club, an England international who was a prolific goalscorer. Wallace was himself not shy in front of goal, but in the 1973–74 season, after making 22 appearances and scoring 21 times, he had the misfortune to break his leg against Blackpool.

Wallace's bad luck was to work in Waterford's favour however, as he began his return from the injury. The Blues manager at the time, John McSeveney, happened to be a good friend of Everton manager Billy Bingham, and in fact was best man at his wedding, and he asked Bingham if he could help out by sending someone over who could get some goals. Wallace decided to come to Waterford and see how it worked out, and what started out to be a twelve-month stint went on for five years.

He made his League of Ireland debut for the Blues against Bohemians on 9 November 1975. The following week, he netted his first goal against Shelbourne at Harold's Cross Stadium. In January 1976, he briefly played with Bobby Charlton, who had signed a short-term contract at Waterford. He was the top scorer in the 1976–77 League of Ireland season. Wallace was Player of the Month in December 1977.

He scored the winning goal in the 1979 FAI Cup semi final against Shamrock Rovers at Dalymount Park. Despite losing the FAI Cup final to Dundalk, this guaranteed entry to the 1979–80 European Cup Winners' Cup as the Lilywhites had won the Double. Unfortunately for Wallace, he missed both ties against IFK Göteborg through injury.

In the summer of 1976, Wallace played for the Utah Golden Spikers of the American Soccer League. In the summer of 1977, he played in Canada in the National Soccer League with the Windsor Stars. In his debut season with Windsor, he recorded 25 goals in 24 matches. In the summer of 1978, he played for the Southern California Lazers. In the summer of 1979, he played for the Cleveland Cobras.

== Honours ==
Waterford United

- FAI Cup: 1980
