= Juan Cano (soccer) =

Colombian-American soccer player (born 1956)

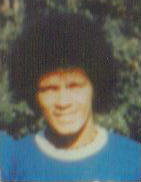

Personal information
- Date of birth: July 12, 1956 (age 70)
- Place of birth: Medellín, Colombia
- Position: Midfielder

Senior career*
Years	Team	Apps	(Gls)
1974–1976	Rhode Island Oceaneers	57	(13)
1977–1978	New Jersey Americans	34	(5)
1979–1980	New England Tea Men	10	(0)
1979–1980	New England Tea Men (indoor)	12	(4)
1981	New England Sharks		
- * Club domestic league appearances and goals

Juan Cano (born July 12, 1956) is a Colombian-American retired professional soccer player who played as a midfielder in the American Soccer League and the North American Soccer League.

In 1974, Cano signed with the Rhode Island Oceaneers of the American Soccer League. In 1977, he moved to the New Jersey Americans. He was First Team All League that season. In 1979, he moved up to the New England Tea Men of the North American Soccer League. In October 1980, the Tea Men released Cano. In 1981, he moved to the New England Sharks of the ASL.
