= Roberto Taylor =

Guatemalan footballer

Personal information
- Date of birth: August 28, 1949 (age 77)
- Place of birth: Guatemala
- Position: Midfielder

Youth career
- Tipografía Nacional
- 1967–1969: Cementos Novella

College career
| Years | Team | Apps | (Gls) |
| 1973–1974 | New Haven Chargers | 26 | (25) |

Senior career*
| Years | Team | Apps | (Gls) |
| 1975 | Connecticut Yankees | | (14) |
| 1976 | Hartford Bicentennials | 9 | (1) |
- * Club domestic league appearances and goals

Roberto Taylor (born 28 August 1949) is a Guatemalan former soccer midfielder who played one season in the American Soccer League and one in the North American Soccer League.

== Club career ==
Taylor grew up in Guatemala where he played for Tipografía Nacional and Cementos Novella.

=== United States ===
In 1971, he entered South Central Community College, but did not play soccer there. In 1973, he transferred to the University of New Haven where he played for Joe Machnik. He played 26 games for New Haven, scoring 25 goals and adding 8 assists. In 1976, he signed with the Connecticut Yankees of the American Soccer League. He finished the season with fourteen goals, putting him fourth in the league in scoring. He also garnered a Rookie of the Year recognition. In 1977, he moved to the Hartford Bicentennials of the first division North American Soccer League. His career was cut short after a 1977 automobile accident left him unable to play.

He was inducted into the New Haven Hall of Fame in 1984 and the Connecticut Soccer Hall of Fame in 2008.

== Retirement ==
He owns the Roberto Taylor Insurance Agency in New Haven. He coached high school soccer at Mark T. Sheehan High School.
