= Stan Startzell =

American soccer player

Personal information
- Full name: Stanley E. Startzell
- Date of birth: September 3, 1950 (age 76)
- Place of birth: McClure, Pennsylvania, United States
- Height: 5 ft 7 in (1.70 m)
- Position: Midfielder

Youth career
- 1969–1971: University of Pennsylvania

Senior career*
Years	Team	Apps	(Gls)
1972	New York Cosmos	3	(0)
1973–1974	Philadelphia Atoms	19	(1)
1975	Boston Minutemen		
1975	Pittsburgh Miners		
- * Club domestic league appearances and goals

Stan Startzell is a retired U.S. soccer midfielder who spent four seasons in the North American Soccer League. He currently works in the financial services sector and is the president of the Duxbury Soccer Association.

== Youth ==
Startzell attended Wilson Senior High School, graduating in 1968. He then attended the University of Pennsylvania where he played on the men’s soccer team from 1969 to 1971. He was a 1969 and 1971 second team All American and a 1970 first team All American. In 1971, he was second team All Ivy League as a placekicker on the Penn football team. In 2005, the University of Pennsylvania selected Startzell to its All Century Team.

== Professional ==
In 1972, the New York Cosmos of the North American Soccer League drafted Startzell. He was the only native U.S. player on the roster that season. He played three games for the Cosmos before moving to the expansion Philadelphia Atoms in 1973. The Atoms won the league championship, but after a disappointing 1974 season, the Atoms made numerous player moves including trading Startzell to the Boston Minutemen in exchange for Alex Papadakis. He played no games for the Minutemen and left the NASL after the 1975 season.

== Post-playing career ==
Startzell has worked with the Special Olympics and in the financial services sector. In the mid-1980s, he worked for Selective Security Trust of America. He currently works for Lincoln Investment Planning in Duxbury, Massachusetts where he also serves as the head of the Duxbury Soccer Association. For many years, he was also the coach of a competitive girls soccer club team called the South Coast Scorpions.
