= Mark Bryant (soccer) =

American soccer player and coach

Personal information
- Place of birth: Antioch, California, U.S.
- Position: Defender

Youth career
- 1976–1978: Chico State

Senior career*
Years	Team	Apps	(Gls)
1979–1980	Sacramento Gold		
1981	New England Sharks		

Managerial career
- 2004–: Los Medanos College
- * Club domestic league appearances and goals

Mark Bryant is an American retired soccer defender who played professionally in the American Soccer League. He currently coaches the Los Medanos College women's team.

Bryant attended Chico State where he played on the men's soccer team from 1976 to 1978. He was inducted into the school's Athletic Hall of Fame in 2001. He then turned professional with the Sacramento Gold of the American Soccer League. In 1981, he moved to the New England Sharks. In 2004, he became the head coach of the Los Medanos College women's team.
