= List of professional sports teams in Delaware =

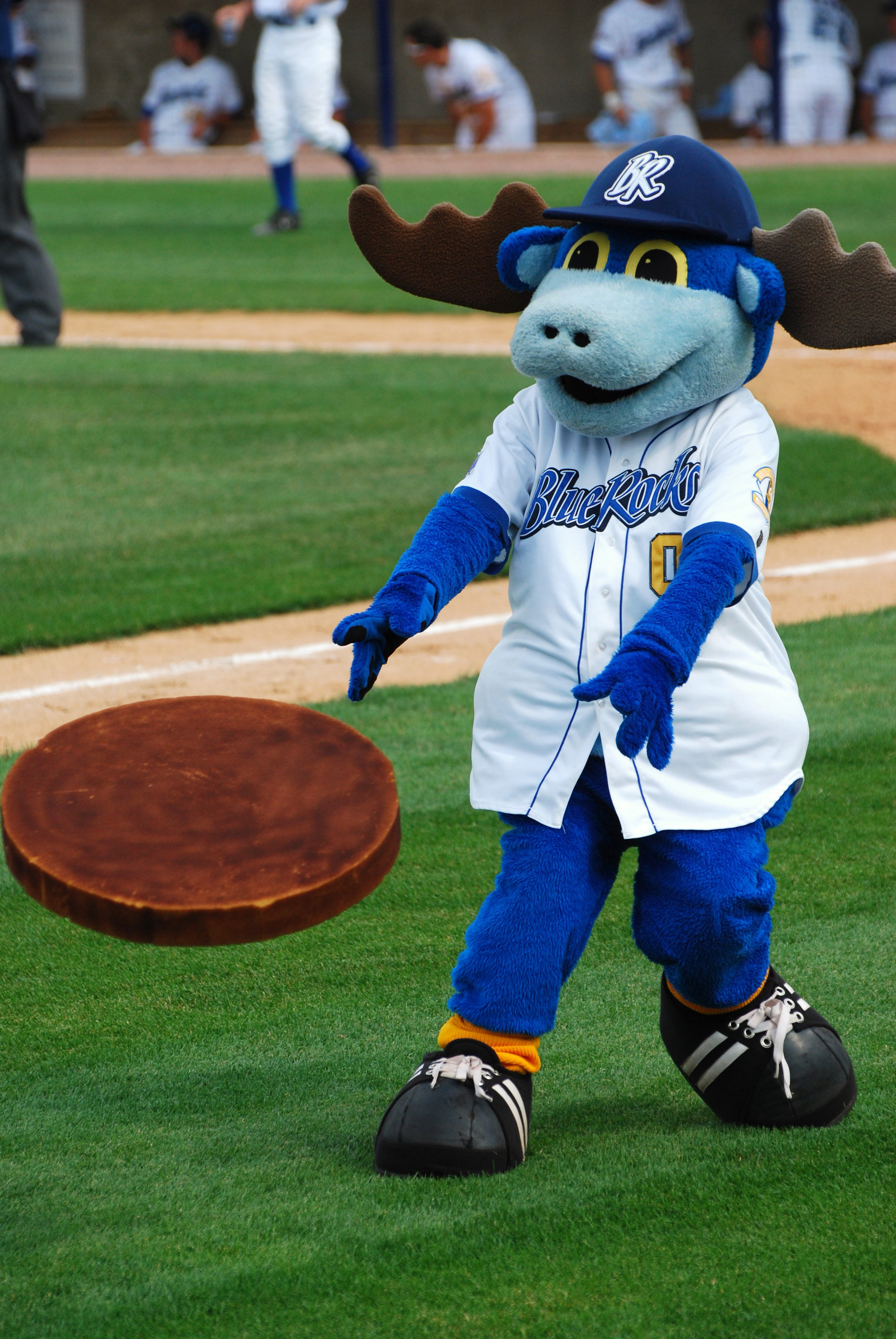
Rocky Bluewinkle, mascot of the Blue Rocks, a minor league baseball team based in Wilmington, Delaware.

This is a list of professional sports teams in Delaware.

| Club | Sport | League | Seasons | Note |
|---|---|---|---|---|
| Central Delaware SA Future | Soccer | WPSL | 2006–2010 | |
| Delaware Blue Coats | Basketball | NBA G League | 2013–present | |
| Delaware Black Foxes | Rugby league | USARL | 2015–present | |
| Delaware Dynasty | Soccer | PDL | 2006–2007 | |
| Delaware Destroyers | Basketball | EBA | 1998–present | Relocated to Philadelphia as The Destroyers (basketball) in 2010 |
| Delaware Griffins | Football | WPFL | Present | |
| Delaware Smash | Tennis | WTT | 1996–2008 | Relocated to Delaware; formerly the New Jersey Stars |
| Delaware Stars | Basketball | USBL | 2007 | |
| Delaware Thunder | Hockey | FPHL | 2019–present | |
| Delaware Wings | Soccer | ASL | 1972–1974 | |
| Delaware Wizards | Soccer | USISL | 1993–2000 | |
| First State Midnight Riders | Soccer | NPSL | 2019–present | |
| First State Fusion | Basketball | ABA | 1997 | Franchise folded before first game. |
| Wilmington Blue Rocks | Baseball | Interstate | 1940–1952 | Original team |
| Wilmington Blue Rocks | Baseball | Carolina | 1993–present | Relocated Peninsula Pilots franchise |
| Wilmington Bombers | Basketball | ABL | 1941–1947 | |
| Wilmington Chicks | Baseball | Tri-State | 1907–1914 | |
| Diamond State Roller Girls | Roller Derby | WFTDA | Present | |
| Southern Delaware Rollergirls | Roller Derby | WFTDA | 2011–present | |
| Wilmington Clippers | Football | AA | 1937–1949 | Original Team |
| Wilmington Clippers/Renegades | Football | ACFL | 1966–1967 | |
| Wilmington Comets | Football | NAFL | 1965 | |
| Wilmington Jets | Basketball | CBA | 1957 | Moved to Allentown. |
| Wilmington Quicksteps | Baseball | Inter-State | 1883–1884 | Moved to Milwaukee. |
| Wilmington Tonies | Football | Independent/WFA | 1925–1929 | Classified as pro from 1925 to 1929, semi-pro afterwards. |
