= Robert Scanlan =

Robert Scanlan may refer to:

- Robert H. Scanlan (1914–2001), civil and aeronautical engineer
- Robert Richard Scanlan (1801–1876), Irish painter and portraitist
- Bob Scanlan (born 1966), baseball player

== See also ==
- Bob Scanlon (disambiguation)
