= Manfred Schellscheidt =

Soccer player (born 1941)

Manny Schellscheidt
Personal information
- Full name: Manfred Schellscheidt
- Date of birth: January 17, 1941 (age 85)
- Place of birth: Solingen, Germany
- Height: 5 ft 10 in (1.78 m)
- Position: Midfielder

Senior career*
Years	Team	Apps	(Gls)
1964	Elizabeth S.C.		
- Union Solingen
- Fortuna Köln
–1972	Elizabeth S.C.		
1973	Philadelphia Atoms	14	(1)
1974	Rhode Island Oceaneers		
1975–1976	Hartford Bicentennials	34	(2)

Managerial career
- –1972: Elizabeth S.C.
- 1974: Rhode Island Oceaneers
- 1975: United States
- 1975–1976: Hartford Bicentennials
- 1977–1979: New Jersey Americans
- 1984: U.S. Olympic
- 1987: Princeton Tigers (assistant)
- 1988–2011: Seton Hall Pirates
- * Club domestic league appearances and goals

Manfred "Manny" Schellscheidt (born January 17, 1941) is a German-American soccer coach and former player. Born in Solingen in the Prussian Rhine Province, he emigrated to the United States in the 1970s. He spent three seasons in the North American Soccer League and one in the American Soccer League. He won two National Challenge Cup and one American Soccer League title as a player as well as two professional championships as a coach. Schellscheidt is a member of the National Soccer Hall of Fame.

== Playing career ==
In 1964, Schellscheidt was visiting his aunt in New York when he was recruited by the coach of Elizabeth S.C. He played a handful of games before returning to Germany. After graduating from the German Sport University Cologne (Deutsche Sporthochschule Köln) in Cologne, Germany, in 1967, he played professionally for Union Solingen and SC Fortuna Köln before moving to the United States. When he arrived in the United States, he immediately rejoined Elizabeth S.C. of the German American Soccer League. He was a member of the team when it won both the 1970 and 1972 National Challenge Cups. In 1973, he signed with the Philadelphia Atoms of the North American Soccer League (NASL). The Atoms won the NASL title that year. In 1974, he became a player-coach with the Rhode Island Oceaneers in the American Soccer League. He took the team to the ASL championship and was named the 1974 ASL Coach of the Year. He returned to the NASL the next season with the Hartford Bicentennials.

== Coaching career ==
After playing two seasons in Hartford, Schellscheidt became the head coach of the New Jersey Americans in 1977 winning another league title that season. He also coached in the North American Soccer League and in 1975 became coach of the United States national team. He also led the U.S. team in the 1984 Olympics qualifying. However, Schellscheidt was replaced four months before the start of the tournament, with a record of nine wins, 14 losses and 11 ties, by Alketas Panagoulias. The departure was contentious, with Schellscheidt saying of Gene Edwards, the USSF president at the time, "[he] told me they couldn't afford two coaches. That's funny, because they hadn't been paying me recently."

In 1988, Schellscheidt was named coach of the Seton Hall University men's team. The Pirates initially experienced success under Schellscheidt, winning two Big East championships, eight NCAA tournament berths, seven conference title game appearances and a trip to the NCAA Sweet 16 in 2001 while having had only one losing season during his first eighteen seasons at the helm. The Pirates, however, have not been successful recently, posting losing records in 2007, 2008, 2009, and 2010 consecutively. Schellscheidt stepped down as the coach of Seton Hall on November 28, 2011.

In 1990, Schellscheidt was inducted into the National Soccer Hall of Fame.

== Personal life ==
Schellscheidt resides in Union Township, Union County, New Jersey with his wife, Annette. Their son Karl Schellscheidt played soccer at Princeton University. They also have two daughters, Jackie and Janet.

In 1992, Schellscheidt published a book, Youth League: Soccer Skills – Mastering the Ball.
