= 1970 American Soccer League =

American Soccer League 1970 season
- Season: 1970
- Teams: 5
- Champions: Philadelphia Ukrainians (6th title)
- Top goalscorer: Juan Paletta (6); Willie Mfum

Statistics of American Soccer League II in season 1970.

== League standings ==
Pos	Team	Pld	W	D	L	GF	GA	Pts
1	Philadelphia Ukrainians	9	6	1	2	17	10	13
2	Philadelphia Spartans	8	5	0	3	20	15	10
3	Boston Astros	8	3	1	4	13	18	7
4	Syracuse Scorpions	6	2	0	4	10	9	4
5	Newark Ukrainian Sitch	5	0	2	3	2	10	2

Source: rsssf.com
