= Tony Francillo =

American soccer player

Tony Francillo was a U.S. soccer forward who earned one cap with the U.S. national team in a 1–0 loss to Poland on August 12, 1973. Francillo, and most of his teammates, were from the second division American Soccer League after the first division North American Soccer League refused to release players for the game. That year, he scored eleven goals in thirteen games for the New York Apollo.
