= Delaware Wings =

The Delaware Wings was an American soccer club that was a member of the American Soccer League.

== Coach ==
- (United States) Al Barrish
- (United States) Charles Duccilli (1974)

== Year-by-year ==
Year	Division	League	Reg. season	Playoffs	U.S. Open Cup
1972	2	ASL	2nd, Southern	Playoffs	Did not enter
1973	2	ASL	3rd, Mid-Atlantic	Did not qualify	Did not enter
1974	2	ASL	5th, East	Did not qualify	Did not enter

== See also ==
- Central Delaware SA Future
- Delaware Dynasty
- Delaware Wizards
- List of professional sports teams in Delaware
