= 1972 American Soccer League =

American Soccer League 1972 season
- Season: 1972
- Teams: 14
- Champions: Cincinnati Comets
- Premiers: New York Greeks
- Top goalscorer: Charles Duccilli (5); Nelson Brizuela; Josip Ognjanac; George Pulita; John Kostakis
- Longest unbeaten run: New York Greeks (10)

Statistics of the American Soccer League II for the 1972 season.

== League standings ==
Northern Conference
Team	Pld	W	D	L	GF	GA	Pts
New York Greeks	10	8	2	0	31	7	18
Boston Astros	10	4	3	3	26	19	11
Connecticut Wildcats	10	5	0	5	11	15	10
New Jersey Brewers	10	4	1	5	21	19	9

Southern Conference
Team	Pld	W	D	L	GF	GA	Pts
Philadelphia Spartans	10	6	3	1	25	12	15
Delaware Wings	10	5	1	4	15	16	11
Baltimore Stars	10	1	3	6	10	33	5
Washington Cavaliers	10	0	1	9	4	22	1

Midwest Conference
Team	Pld	W	D	L	GF	GA	Pts
Cincinnati Comets	8	6	1	1	19	7	13
Cleveland Stars	8	6	0	2	23	10	6 (Note: 6 points deducted?)
Detroit Mustangs	8	2	2	4	13	28	6
Pittsburgh Canons	8	2	1	5	11	18	5
St. Louis Frogs	8	2	0	6	13	16	4
Chicago Americans (Note: Chicago Americans played only a few games)	0	?	?	?	?	?	0

== Playoffs ==
=== Bracket ===
First round
M1	Cincinnati Comets	-
bye	-
N1	New York Greeks	1
S2	Delaware Wings	0
S1	Philadelphia Spartans	1
N2	Boston Astros	0

Eastern playoff
M1	Cincinnati Comets	-
bye	-
N1	New York Greeks	2
S1	Philadelphia Spartans	0

ASL Championship final
M1	Cincinnati Comets	2
N1	New York Greeks	1

=== First round ===
August 19	Philadelphia Spartans	1–0	Boston Astros	Northeast High School • Att. ???

August 20	New York Greeks	1–0	Delaware Wings	Metropolitan Oval • Att. ???

=== Eastern playoff ===
September 4	New York Greeks	2–0 (AET)	Philadelphia Spartans	Metropolitan Oval • Att. ???

=== Championship final ===
September 9, 1973
6:30 PM EST

Cincinnati Comets (OH)	2–1	New York Greeks (NY)
Valdemar 3:45' (Brizuela); Charley Roberts 53:45' (Aguirre)	Report	John Navronatis 5:10' (Nanos)

St. Xavier Stadium, Cincinnati, Ohio
Referee: (USA)
