= Delaware Stars =

- League: USBL 2007–present
- Founded: 2007
- History: Delaware Stars; 2007-2011
- Arena: Pratt Gymnasium
- Location: Wilmington, Delaware
- Team colors: Gray, Silver, Black
- Head coach: Mike Richmond
- Ownership: Richmond Group International, LLC
- Championships: 0

The Delaware Stars were a United States Basketball League franchise in Wilmington, Delaware. They played on the main campus of Wilmington University. They started playing in 2007. After posting an 0–8 record, the Stars folded in mid-season.

== See also ==
- Delaware Destroyers
- First State Fusion
- Wilmington Bombers
- Wilmington Jets
- List of professional sports teams in Delaware
