= Inter-Italian SC =

Inter-Italian Soccer Club
- Full name: Inter-Italian Soccer Club
- Short name: Cleveland Inter
- Founded: 1957

The Inter-Italian Soccer Club, also known as Cleveland Inter, was a soccer team based in Cleveland.

== History ==
Founded in 1957, the club was a National Amateur Cup finalist in 1971, losing the final for St. Louis Kutis S.C. In 1973, the club was the 1973 National Challenge Cup's runner-up.

== Honors ==
- National Challenge Cup
  - Runner-up (1): 1973
- National Amateur Cup
  - Runner-up (1): 1971
