= Santa Barbara Condors =

American soccer club

Santa Barbara Condors was an American soccer club that was a member of the American Soccer League for part of the 1977 season.

The club had brought in top players, but folded halfway through their only season with the league's highest payroll but players who hadn't been paid for two months.

== Year-by-year ==
Year	Division	League	Reg. season	Playoffs	U.S. Open Cup
1977	2	ASL	4th, West	N/A	Did not enter
