= Joel Senior (footballer, born 1987) =

Jamaican footballer (born 1987)

Personal information
- Date of birth: 7 December 1987 (age 38)
- Place of birth: Kingston, Jamaica
- Height: 5 ft 6 in (1.68 m)
- Position: Attacking midfielder

College career
Years	Team	Apps	(Gls)
2006–2007	Howard Bison		
2008–2009	James Madison Dukes		

Senior career*
Years	Team	Apps	(Gls)
2007	Delaware Dynasty	9	(0)
2010	Real Maryland Monarchs	13	(1)
2011–2016	Harbour View F.C.	117	(2)
Total		139	(3)

International career
2006–2007	Jamaica U-20	6	(0)
2012	Jamaica	7	(0)
- * Club domestic league appearances and goals

Joel Senior (born 7 December 1987) is a Jamaican former professional footballer who played as an attacking midfielder.

== Club career ==
=== College and amateur ===
Senior moved from his native Jamaica to the Washington D.C. area as a child. He attended Archbishop Carroll High School, where he was the Washington Catholic Athletic Conference Player of the Year as a junior and senior and the Gatorade Player of the Year for Washington, D.C., as a senior.

Senior played two years of college soccer for Howard Bison at Howard University, moving to James Madison University and James Madison Dukes prior to his junior year. He won JMU's Justin Armitage/Michael J. Frye Memorial Award in 2008, and was named to the All-CAA conference third team as a senior in 2009.

During his college years Senior also played for Delaware Dynasty in the USL Premier Development League.

=== Professional ===
Senior turned professional in 2010 when he signed to play for the Real Maryland Monarchs in the USL Second Division. He made his professional on 22 May 2010 in a game against the Charlotte Eagles. In 2011, Senior signed with Harbour View F.C. in the National Premiere League.

== International career ==
Senior played for the Jamaica U20 national team in the final round of CONCACAF Under-20 Tournament in 2007. He was subsequently called into the senior national team training camp in spring 2008, He made his debut for the side against Cuba in a Friendly on 22 February 2012.
