= Charles Duccilli =

American soccer player and coach

Personal information
- Date of birth: February 14, 1946 (age 80)
- Place of birth: Philadelphia, Pennsylvania, United States
- Height: 5 ft 7 in (1.70 m)
- Position: Forward

Youth career
- 1965–1967: Temple Owls

Senior career*
Years	Team	Apps	(Gls)
1971–1972	Philadelphia Spartans	?	(16)
1973	Philadelphia Atoms	4	(1)
1974	Delaware Wings		
1975	Pittsburgh Miners		
1976	New Jersey Americans		

Managerial career
- 1970–1981: Kennedy High School
- 1974: Delaware Wings
- 1981–1983: Rutgers University (assistant)
- 1984–1999: Rutgers University (women)
- 2001–2002: New York Power (assistant)
- 2002: New York Power
- * Club domestic league appearances and goals

Charles Duccilli (born February 14, 1946) is an American former soccer forward who played in the North American Soccer League and American Soccer League who led the ASL in scoring in 1971 and 1972. He later coached at the professional, collegiate and youth levels.

== Player ==
=== Youth ===
Duccilli graduated from Germantown High School and attended Temple University where he played on the school's soccer team from 1965 to 1967. He holds the school record for career goals with sixty-six. He was inducted into the Temple Owls Hall of Fame in 1983.

=== Professional ===
In 1971, Duccilli signed with the Philadelphia Spartans of the American Soccer League. He led the league in scoring with eleven goals in 1971 and five goals in 1972. In 1973, he joined the Philadelphia Atoms of the North American Soccer League, winning the league title with them that season. In 1974, he was a player-coach with the Delaware Wings of the American Soccer League. In 1976, he played for the New Jersey Americans in the American Soccer League.

== Coach ==
In 1974, he was a player coach with the Delaware Wings of the American Soccer League. Duccilli spent several years as an assistant coach with the Rutgers University men's soccer team as well as twelve years as head coach of the Kennedy High School boys' soccer team. At Kennedy, he compiled a 135–56–19 record, winning nine championships and was a two-time South Jersey Coach of the Year. In 1984, he became the head coach of the newly established Rutgers University women's soccer team. He resigned following the 1999 season having compiled a 167-114-126 record. In 2001, he became an assistant coach with the New York Power of the Women's United Soccer Association. In June 2002, the team fired head coach Pat Farmer and elevated Duccilli to the position of head coach.

In 2003, Duccilli became a sales associate with Coldwell Banker. In October 2007, he was hired as the director of coaching of the Cape Express Soccer Club in Cape May County, New Jersey.
