= John Roeslein =

American soccer player

Personal information
- Place of birth: United States
- Positions: Forward; midfielder

Youth career
- 1971–1972: Florissant Valley Community College
- 1973–1974: St. Louis University

Senior career*
Years	Team	Apps	(Gls)
1976–1977	New Jersey Americans		
1977	→ Tranmere Rovers (loan)		
- * Club domestic league appearances and goals

John Roeslein is an American retired soccer player who was a member of championship teams at the high school, junior college, NCAA Division I and professional levels. He played two seasons in the American Soccer League where he was the 1976 Rookie of the Year.

== Youth ==
Roeslein grew up in St. Louis, Missouri playing for numerous notable youth teams. He attended St. Mary's High School which won the 1970 Missouri High School soccer championship. He attended Florissant Valley Community College, playing for the school's soccer team in 1971 and 1972. He and his teammates won the 1971 National Junior College National Championships. In 1973, he transferred to St. Louis University where he won the 1973 NCAA Men's Soccer Championship.

== Professional ==
In 1976, Roeslein signed with the New Jersey Americans of the American Soccer League. He shared Rookie of the Year honors with Steve Ralbovsky. He also played briefly on loan with English Football League club Tranmere Rovers F.C. in 1976, although he never made any appearances for the first team. In 1977, the New Jersey Americans won the ASL championship.

== Amateur ==
He retired from professional soccer following the 1977 season and returned to St. Louis where he played the rest of his career with local amateur teams. In 1978, he was with Busch Gardens S.C. before moving to St. Louis Kutis S.C. in 1979. He has also coached extensively on the youth level in the St. Louis area. He was inducted into the St. Louis Soccer Hall of Fame in 2008.
