= Utah Golden Spikers =

Utah Golden Spikers / Pioneers
- Full name: Utah Golden Spikers
- Nickname: Golden Spikers
- Founded: 1976
- League: American Soccer League

The Utah Golden Spikers was an American soccer club based in Salt Lake City, Utah that was a member of the American Soccer League. The team became the Utah Pioneers, a new franchise with new owners, during the latter stages of their only season, after the Golden Spikers were ousted from the league for nonpayment of their financial obligations.

They were coached by former Olympiakos of Greece player, Nick Kambolis.

== Year-by-year ==
After challenging the eventual ASL champion Los Angeles Skyhawks for the Western Division title through most of the 1976 season, Utah faded late and finished 3rd. They lost in the playoff quarterfinals to the Tacoma Tides by a score of 2–1.

| Year | Division | League | Reg. season | Playoffs | U.S. Open Cup |
|---|---|---|---|---|---|
| 1976 | 2 | ASL | 3rd, West | 1st Round | Did not enter |

== 1976 Roster ==
Note: Flags indicate national team as defined under FIFA eligibility rules; some limited exceptions apply. Players may hold more than one non-FIFA nationality.

| No. | Pos. | Nation | Player |
|---|---|---|---|
| 1 | GK | IRL | Peter Thomas |
| 2 | DF | | Jan Swierniak |
| 3 | DF | USA | Edmond Kelly |
| 4 | DF | ARG | Daniel Mammana |
| 5 | DF | IRL | Tom O'Dea |
| 6 | FW | SCO | Vinnie McCarthy |
| 7 | FW | | Ramon Ramirez |
| 8 | FW | BRA | Helio Barbosa |
| 9 | FW | ENG | Sid Wallace |
| 10 | MF | GRE | Kyriakos Fitilis |
| 11 | MF | TRI | Tony Douglas (loan in) |
| 11 | FW | | John Hendricks |
| 13 | FW | ZAM | Cresswell McTavish |
| 12 | FW | SCO | Billy McNicol |
| 14 | DF | | George Kondiledas |
| 15 | DF | USA | George Kossman |
| 17 | DF | | Mike Clement |

| No. | Pos. | Nation | Player |
|---|---|---|---|
| — | DF | USA | Dee Benson |
| — | GK | | Toi Brown |
| — | DF | USA | Gus Colessides |
| — | FW | GRE | Dimitrios Dimitrakis |
| — | DF | USA | Marty Elting |
| — | GK | USA | Tony Escobar |
| — | DF | USA | Keith Fisher |
| — | MF | CAN | Tibor Gemeri |
| — | FW | USA | Dee J. Harding |
| — | | NED | Martin Heltin |
| — | DF | GER | Hans Henchen |
| — | | | Danny Martinez |
| — | FW | | Roberto Mesini |
| — | FW | USA | John Micklewright |
| — | DF | BRA | Paulo Peralta |
| — | GK | USA | Terry Weekes |
