= Baltimore Bays (1972–73) =

Soccer team in the United States, 1972–73

The second Baltimore Bays were a soccer team based in Baltimore, Maryland that played in the American Soccer League. They were called the Baltimore Stars in 1972.

The team suffered heavy financial losses, with president Jim Karvellas stating that they lost $150,000 in their two years of operations.

== Year-by-year ==
Year	Division	League	Reg. Season	Playoffs	Open Cup
1972	2	ASL	3rd, Southern	Did not qualify	Did not enter
1973	2	ASL	1st, Mid-Atlantic	Playoffs	Did not enter
