= John McGeady =

Scottish footballer (born 1958)

Personal information
- Date of birth: 17 April 1958 (age 68)
- Place of birth: Glasgow, Scotland
- Position: Winger

Youth career
- Third Lanark

Senior career*
Years	Team	Apps	(Gls)
1975–1977	Sheffield United	16	(0)
1978	Southern California Lazers	20	(3)
1978–1979	Newport County	2	(0)
Total		38	(3)
- * Club domestic league appearances and goals

John McGeady (born 17 April 1958) is a Scottish former professional footballer who played as a winger in Scotland, England and the United States. He is the father of Republic of Ireland international player Aiden McGeady.

== Early life ==
McGeady was born in Glasgow to parents originally from County Donegal, and educated at Holyrood Secondary School. Residing in Govanhill, with his father and younger brother Pat he attended matches of Third Lanark, whose ground was located a few blocks from their home, until the club folded in 1967.

== Playing career ==
Beginning as an amateur in Scotland with Third Lanark (the juvenile team having continued after the demise of the professional arm), McGeady signed professional terms with Sheffield United in 1975, making 16 league appearances. He was briefly a teammate of the famous former Celtic winger Jimmy Johnstone, but suffered a serious injury to his knee aged 19.

McGeady then spent time in the American Soccer League with the Southern California Lazers, before going to play with Newport County, where he made two league appearances between 1978 and 1979 before retiring aged 23.

== Career after football ==
After the end of his footballing career McGeady worked in the construction industry before becoming an English teacher at Holyrood Secondary, where he had been a pupil.
