= Southern California Lazers =

- Full name: Southern California Lazers
- Founded: 1978
- Dissolved: 1978
- Ground: Murdock Stadium
- Capacity: 12,127
- League: American Soccer League

The Southern California Lazers were an American soccer club based in Torrance, California that was a member of the American Soccer League.

== History ==
The Lazers were formed in 1978 as an ASL expansion franchise in suburban Los Angeles and owned by real estate developer Jack Young, who formerly owned local rival Los Angeles Skyhawks.

The club hired veteran English defender Laurie Calloway as head coach - the first opportunity of a coaching career that would include stints in the North American Soccer League and Major League Soccer. Arguably the biggest name on the roster was Rildo, the former Brazilian international defender who teamed with Pele on Brazil's national team, Santos FC, and the New York Cosmos. With 14 goals, forward Sid Wallace led the Lazers in scoring. Goalkeeper John Granville led the league with a 0.99 goals against average and posted seven clean sheets. Four Lazers players (Rildo, Wallace, Granville, and defender Paul Cahill) were voted by the league's coaches to the ASL All Star team at season's end.

The Lazers enjoyed a successful regular season at 15-8-1 to place third in the Western Division and received a postseason berth. However, they fell in the first round of the ASL playoffs to the California Sunshine by a score of 2–1. Despite having the second highest attendance of all ASL clubs in 1978, the club folded after their debut season.

== Coach ==
- (England) Laurie Calloway
- (England) Jimmy Melia Assistant Coach

== 1978 roster ==
- (England) Sid Wallace
- (Brazil) Rildo
- (Trinidad and Tobago) John Granville
- (England) Paul Cahill
- (England) Paul Johnson
- (England) Keith Walley
- (United States) Charlie Kadupski
- (England) Bernie Fagan
- (England) Jack Howarth
- (Scotland) John McGeady
- (Spain) Ignacio Salcedo
- (England) Frank Towers

== Year-by-year ==
Year	Division	League	Reg. season	Playoffs	U.S. Open Cup	Avg. Attend.
1978	2	ASL	3rd, Western	1st Round	Did not enter	3,915
