= Joe Luxbacher =

American soccer player and coach

Personal information
- Full name: Joseph A. Luxbacher
- Date of birth: February 10, 1951 (age 75)
- Place of birth: Beadling, Pennsylvania, U.S.
- Height: 6 ft 0 in (1.83 m)
- Position: Forward

Youth career
- 1970–1973: Pittsburgh Panthers

Senior career*
Years	Team	Apps	(Gls)
1974	Philadelphia Atoms	5	(0)
1975–1976	Pittsburgh Miners	6	(4)
1979–1981	Pittsburgh Spirit (indoor)	18	(2)

Managerial career
- 1975: Pittsburgh Panthers (assistant)
- 1976: Penn Quakters (assistant)
- 1978–1981: Mount Union Purple Raiders
- 1983: Pittsburgh Panthers (assistant)
- 1984–2015: Pittsburgh Panthers
- * Club domestic league appearances and goals

Joe Luxbacher (born February 10, 1951) is an American former soccer player and coach at University of Pittsburgh. He spent one season in the North American Soccer League and at least one in the American Soccer League.

Luxbacher graduated from Upper St. Clair High School before attending the University of Pittsburgh, graduating in 1974 with a bachelor's degree in biology. He also received from Pitt a masters in Physical Education and Recreation in 1978 and a PhD in Administration of Physical Education and Athletics in 1985. Luxbacher spent four seasons on the Pittsburgh Panthers men's soccer (Pitt Panthers) and holds school records for most goals(38), and points(84).

In 1974, he played five games with the Philadelphia Atoms in the North American Soccer League. In 1975, he played for the Pittsburgh Miners in the American Soccer League. In the fall of 1976 Luxbacher served as an assistant coach with the University of Pennsylvania's men's soccer team. In 1978, he became the head coach at Mount Union College, a position he held until 1981. In addition to coaching Mount Union, Luxbacher also played for Pittsburgh Spirit in the Major Indoor Soccer League from 1979 to 1981. In 1983, he returned to Pitt as an assistant and was elevated to head coach the next year. He has coached at Pitt for 24 seasons, and is the school's second men's soccer coach.

In 23 years he has: compiled a 183–173–45 record; was the 1992 and 1995 Big East Coach of the Year; and his teams have posted 11 winning seasons, six 10 win seasons, and seven Big East Conference Tournament appearances. In 1995 Pitt won a school record with 14 games, including its first ever Big East Conference Tournament win. He has also written 15 books on coaching soccer.

== Selected bibliography ==
- Attacking Soccer, Joseph Luxbacher
- Soccer Practice Games 3E, Joseph Luxbacher
- Soccer: Steps to Success 3E, Joseph Luxbacher
