= Walter Giesler =

American soccer player, administrator, and coach

Walter John Giesler (September 6, 1909 – July 5, 1976) was an American soccer administrator, and coach best known for coaching the United States men's national soccer team in the 1950 FIFA World Cup.

== Early life and career ==
Born in St. Louis, Missouri, Giesler would become a towering figure on the Midwestern sports landscape. After playing at McBride High School, he would compete in several amateur and professional leagues, including the Ben Millers in the St. Louis Soccer League.

== U.S. Soccer ==
Following his playing days, he became an administrator and referee, and owned a sporting goods business in St. Louis. Giesler was the second vice-president of the United States Soccer Football Association, serving from 1945 to 1948. He was then elected president and served in that capacity from 1948 until 1949. Giesler coached the United States men's national soccer team during the 1948 Olympic Games in London and the 1950 FIFA World Cup in Brazil.

Giesler was inducted into the National Soccer Hall of Fame in 1952 and the St. Louis Soccer Hall of Fame in 1971. In 1972 he was the general manager of the St. Louis Frogs of the ASL.

He died in Philadelphia on July 5, 1976, during the induction of the United States 1950 World Cup soccer team into the U.S. Soccer Hall of Fame.
