= LeBard Stadium =

American football stadium in Costa Mesa, California

Coordinates: 33°40′21″N 117°54′37″W

LeBard Stadium is a 7,600-seat stadium located on the Orange Coast College campus in Costa Mesa, California. It is the home football stadium for both the Orange Coast College Pirates and the Golden West College Rustlers football teams. The stadium opened on September 16, 1955, and is lined for both football and soccer.

Originally named Pirate Stadium, it was renamed in 1967 for Harry R. LeBard, a community leader and a founding member of the district's board of trustees.
