= Paul Cahill (English footballer) =

English footballer (1955–2021)

Personal information
- Full name: Paul Gerard Cahill
- Date of birth: 29 September 1955
- Place of birth: Liverpool, England
- Date of death: 6 June 2021 (aged 65)
- Position: Defender

Senior career*
Years	Team	Apps	(Gls)
1973–1975	Coventry City	0	(0)
1975–1978	Portsmouth	97	(2)
1977–1978	→ Aldershot (loan)	2	(0)
1978	Southern California Lazers	24	(1)
1978–1979	Tranmere Rovers	5	(0)
1978–1979	Stockport County	3	(0)
1979–1981	California Surf	70	(1)
1979–1981	California Surf (indoor)		
1981–1982	San Jose Earthquakes	11	(0)
1982–1983	Golden Bay Earthquakes (indoor)	0	(0)
- * Club domestic league appearances and goals

Paul Gerard Cahill (29 September 1955 – 6 June 2021) was an English association football defender who played during the 1970s and 1980s.

Cahill played in the Football League for Coventry City, Portsmouth, Aldershot, Tranmere Rovers and Stockport County. In 1978, he signed with the Southern California Lazers of the American Soccer League (where he earned all-league honors), before moving to the California Surf of the North American Soccer League in 1979. In 1981, he transferred to the San Jose Earthquakes, ending his career in 1982.

Cahill died on 6 June 2021, at the age of 65.
