= Jack Howarth (footballer) =

English footballer

Personal information
- Date of birth: 27 February 1945 (age 81)
- Place of birth: Crook, County Durham, England
- Position: Centre forward

Youth career
- Stanley United

Senior career*
Years	Team	Apps	(Gls)
1963–1964	Chelsea	0	(0)
1964–1965	Swindon Town	2	(0)
1965–1972	Aldershot	259	(113)
1972–1973	Rochdale	40	(12)
1973–1977	Aldershot	163	(58)
1977–1978	Bournemouth	42	(6)
1978	Southport	9	(1)
1978	Southern California Lazers	20	(6)
- Basingstoke Town
- Andover
- Romsey Town
Total		535	(196)
- * Club domestic league appearances and goals

Jack Howarth (born 27 February 1945) is an English retired professional footballer who played as a centre forward. Active in England and the United States, Howarth made over 500 appearances in the Football League, scoring nearly 200 goals. His 171 league goals for Aldershot is a club record.

== Career ==
Born in Crook, County Durham, Howarth began his career with local side Stanley United. He signed professional forms with Chelsea in 1963, but never made an appearance for them, and moved to Swindon Town a year later. Howarth also played in the Football League for Aldershot, Rochdale, Bournemouth and Southport, before moving to the United States to play for the Southern California Lazers of the second division American Soccer League.

He has a place in the history of the original Aldershot side (which was founded in 1926 and went bankrupt in 1992, having been Football League members since 1932), having scored a record 196 goals for the club in all competitions.

Howarth later returned to England to play non-league football with Basingstoke Town, Andover and Romsey Town.
