= John Granville (footballer) =

Trinidad and Tobago footballer

Personal information
- Full name: John Hubert Granville
- Date of birth: May 6, 1956 (age 70)
- Place of birth: Scarborough, Trinidad and Tobago
- Position: Goalkeeper

Senior career*
Years	Team	Apps	(Gls)
1978	Oakland Stompers	0	(0)
1978	Southern California Lazers	18	(0)
1979	Cleveland Cobras	?	(?)
1980–1984	ASL Sports	?	(?)
1985	Slough Town	9	(0)
1985–1986	Millwall	6	(0)
1986–1987	Los Angeles Heat	7	(0)
1988–1991	Wycombe Wanderers	120	(0)
1991–1992	Aldershot	30	(0)
1992	Chertsey Town	5	(0)
1994–1995	Chesham United	?	(?)
2001	Doc's Khelwalaas	1	(0)
2002	Hayes	1	(0)

International career
- Trinidad and Tobago

Managerial career
- 2006–2007: Wycombe Wanderers (assistant)
- 2007–2009: Swindon Town (assistant)
- * Club domestic league appearances and goals

John Granville (born 1956) is a retired professional football goalkeeper from Trinidad and Tobago.

== Life ==
Granville was born on the island of Tobago, in Scarborough. In 1978, he played for the Southern California Lazers and was selected to the American Soccer League all-star team. Granville led the league in goalkeeping with a 0.99 goals against average and posted seven clean sheets. In 1979, he played for the Cleveland Cobras, also of the ASL.

He was a goalkeeper and represented Trinidad and Tobago at international level. Granville was on the Trinidad and Tobago team at the 1975 Pan American Games.

He has been goalkeeping coach at Wycombe Wanderers and Swindon Town.

== Honours ==
Wycombe Wanderers

- FA Trophy: 1990–91
