= New Jersey Brewers =

Defunct American soccer club

New Jersey Schaefer Brewers was an American soccer club that was a member of the American Soccer League.

Established as the New Jersey Schaefer Brewers, they became the New Jersey Brewers after their first season. The team folded after the 1975 season and was replaced in the league by the New Jersey Americans.

== Year-by-year ==
Year	Division	League	Reg. season	Playoffs	U.S. Open Cup
1972	2	ASL	4th, Northern	Did not qualify	Did not enter
1973	2	ASL	2nd, Mid-Atlantic	Did not qualify	Did not enter
1974	2	ASL	3rd, East	Did not qualify	Did not enter
1975	2	ASL	2nd, South	Did not qualify	Did not enter
