= Indianapolis Daredevils =

Soccer team

The Indianapolis Daredevils, known officially as the Indy Daredevils, was an American soccer club based in Indianapolis, Indiana that was a member of the American Soccer League. The team's home field was the Butler Bowl at Butler University.

The team was previously known as the New England Oceaneers.

== Year-by-year ==
| Year | Division | League | Reg. season | Playoffs | U.S. Open Cup |
|---|---|---|---|---|---|
| 1978 | 2 | ASL | 3rd, Eastern | 1st Round | Did not enter |
| 1979 | 2 | ASL | 4th, Western | Did not qualify | Did not enter |
