= Pierce Memorial Field =

Stadium in East Providence, Rhode Island

- Interactive map of Pierce Memorial Field
- Coordinates: 41°48′38″N 71°23′0″W

Pierce Memorial Field is an 8,000-capacity stadium located in East Providence, Rhode Island. From 2003–2008, the stadium was home to the Rhode Island Stingrays soccer team. The venue also hosts most of the high school athletics events in East Providence. It was the site of the Harold Gomes-Paul Jorgensen World Super Featherweight Championship held on July 20, 1959.

Opened in 1938, it was a Works Progress Administration project built on an abandoned gravel pit belonging to the McCormick Construction Company. It is named for W. P. Pierce, who had left a trust fund for recreational purposes in the town.
