= Cincinnati Comets =

Soccer club based in Cincinnati, Ohio, US

- Founded: 1972; 54 years ago
- Dissolved: 1975; 51 years ago
- Stadium: Nippert Stadium
- Coach: Nick Capurro
- League: American Soccer League

The Cincinnati Comets was an American soccer club based in Cincinnati, Ohio, that was a member of the American Soccer League. The Comets won the ASL in 1972, led by 16-year-old Costa Rican-American midfielder Ringo Cantillo who won Most Valuable Player that year. At the time Cantillo was a high school student at McNicholas High School and living with head coach Nick Capurro. Cantillo went on to win MVP three more times in the ASL. The following year in 1973 the Comets advanced to the championship again ultimately losing to the New York Apollo.

== Coaches ==
- (United States) Nick Capurro (1972–73)

== Stadiums ==
- 1972: St. Xavier High School
- 1973: Nippert Stadium (playoff game against Cleveland played at St. Xavier High School)
- 1974–75: Trechter Stadium, Cincinnati Technical College, now Cincinnati State Technical and Community College

== Year-by-year ==
Year	Division	League	Reg. season	Playoffs	U.S. Open Cup
1972	2	ASL	1st, Midwestern	Champion	Did not enter
1973	2	ASL	1st, Midwest	Final	Did not enter
1974	2	ASL	2nd, Midwest	Playoffs	Did not enter
1975	2	ASL	2nd, Midwest	Did not qualify	Did not enter

== Honors ==
League Championship

- Winner (1): 1972
- Runner Up (1): 1973

League MVP

- 1972: Ringo Cantillo
- 1974: Ringo Cantillo

Leading Scorer

- 1973: Eddy Roberts

Leading Goalkeeper

- 1973: Antion Cruz

Coach of the Year

- 1972: Nick Capurro
