= Chicago Americans =

The Chicago Americans was an American soccer club based in Chicago, Illinois that was a member of the American Soccer League. They only played a few games in their only season. During their time they were also known as Chicago Inter and Chicago Hercules.

== Year-by-year ==
Year	Division	League	Reg. season	Playoffs	U.S. Open Cup
1972	2	ASL	Only played a few games	N/A	N/A
