= Detroit Mustangs =

The Detroit Mustangs was an American soccer club based in Detroit, Michigan that was a member of the American Soccer League. The Mustangs began their first season known simply as Detroit S.C..

== Year-by-year ==
Year	Division	League	Reg. season	Playoffs	U.S. Open Cup
1972	2	ASL	3rd, Midwestern	Did not qualify	Did not enter
1973	2	ASL	4th, Midwest	Did not qualify	Did not enter
