= Connecticut Yankees (soccer) =

American soccer team

- Full name: Connecticut Yankees
- Nickname: Yankees
- Founded: 1972
- Dissolved: 1978
- Stadium: Dillon Stadium; Hartford, Connecticut
- League: American Soccer League

The Connecticut Yankees were a soccer team based in Hartford, Connecticut, and played their home matches at Dillon Stadium. They played in the American Soccer League for seven seasons, from 1972 to 1978, when they folded. The team had an extended history of financial problems which led to massive player turnover. The club was legendary for developing the sport in Connecticut.

The team was established in 1972 as the Northeast United. They changed their name to the Connecticut Wildcats in 1973, and adopted the name Connecticut Yankees after the 1974 season. During their run they advanced to the playoffs once, in 1977, and were knocked out in the first round.

== Year-by-year ==
Year	Division	League	Reg. season	Playoffs	U.S. Open Cup
Nor'East United
1972	2	ASL	3rd, Northern	Did not qualify	Did not enter
Connecticut Wildcats
1973	2	ASL	2nd, Northeast	Did not qualify	Did not enter
1974	2	ASL	4th, East	Did not qualify	Did not enter
Connecticut Yankees
1975	2	ASL	3rd, North	Did not qualify	Did not enter
1976	2	ASL	5th, East	Did not qualify	Did not enter
1977	2	ASL	4th, East	1st Round	Did not enter
1978	2	ASL	6th, Eastern	Did not qualify	Did not enter

== Honors ==
Rookie of the Year

- 1975: Roberto Taylor

== Coaches ==
- Bobby Kratzor
- Rene Koremans
