= New England Sharks =

The New England Sharks were an American soccer club that played a single season, 1981, in the American Soccer League. The team's home matches were played at Sargent Field (now Paul Walsh Field) in New Bedford, Massachusetts for the first half of the season, before shifting to Dunnell Park in Pawtucket, Rhode Island as a cost-saving measure.

Along with the move to Dunnell Park, the Sharks also hired a new coach (Victor Gaspar) and dropped all but one of their players in favour of local amateurs. Despite the drastic cost-cutting, the franchise ran out of operating capital after playing just seventeen matches of its 28-game schedule, and dropped out of the ASL. New England's record at the time was 4-13; league officials opted to award 1-0 forfeit victories to the Sharks' opponents in the eleven games remaining to be played on their schedule. As a result, their overall record appears as 4-24 in the final league standings for the 1981 season.

== 1981 Roster ==
- (United States) Mark Bryant
- (United States) Len Mercurio

== Year-by-year ==
Year	Division	League	Reg. season	Playoffs	U.S. Open Cup
1981	2	ASL	4th, Liberty	Did not qualify	Did not enter
