= Boston Astros =

The Boston Astros was an American soccer club based in Boston, Massachusetts, that was a member of the American Soccer League. Initially playing under the name Fall River Astros, the team folded before being restarted under the new Boston Astros name.The team also played at Boston College's Alumni Stadium

The team played its home games at Nickerson Field during 1974 and 1975. At the end of the 1975 season, the team moved to Worcester, Massachusetts. John Bertos was the owner, general manager and head coach of the Boston Astros.

== Year-by-year ==
=== As the Fall River Astros ===
Year	Division	League	Reg. season	Playoffs	U.S. Open Cup
1967/68	2	ASL	2nd, Premier	Did not qualify	?
1968	2	ASL	4th	No playoff	N/A

=== As the Boston Astros ===
Year	Division	League	Reg. season	Playoffs	U.S. Open Cup
1969	2	ASL	3rd, Northern	Did not qualify	Did not enter
1970	2	ASL	3rd	No playoff	Did not enter
1971	2	ASL	2nd	No playoff	Did not enter
1972	2	ASL	2nd, Northern	Playoffs	Did not enter
1973	2	ASL	3rd, Northeast	Did not qualify	Quarterfinals
1974	2	ASL	2nd, East	Playoffs	Did not enter
1975	2	ASL	1st, North	Co-champion	Did not enter
