= New Jersey Americans (soccer) =

Soccer team in the United States

The New Jersey Americans were an American soccer club based in New Brunswick, New Jersey that was a member of the American Soccer League. The team won the ASL championship in 1977, in its second year of existence.

After the 1979 season, the club moved to Miami, Florida and became known as the Miami Americans.

== Year-by-year ==
Year	Division	League	Reg. season	Playoffs	U.S. Open Cup
1976	2	ASL	6th, East	Did not qualify	Did not enter
1977	2	ASL	1st, East	Champion	Did not enter
1978	2	ASL	2nd, Eastern	Semifinals	Did not enter
1979	2	ASL	4th, Eastern	Did not qualify	Did not enter

== Coaches ==
- Rich Melvin: 1976
- Manny Schellscheidt: 1977-1978
- Arthur Stewart: 1979
- Tom O'Dea: 1979
- Eddie Firmani: 1979

== Notable players ==
- (United States) Juan Cano (1977–78) 34 Apps 5 Goals
- (United States) (Costa Rica) Ringo Cantillo (1977) 22 Apps 7 Goals
- (Portugal) Eusébio (1978) 9 Apps 2 Goals
- (United States) Woody Hartman (1976)
- (United States) Kevin Kiernan (1976) 21 Apps 6 Goals
- (Brazil) Jose Neto (1977–78) 39 Apps 34 Goals
- (United States) (Portugal) Telmo Pires (1977) 43 Apps 13 Goals
- (Republic of Ireland) Tom O'Dea (1977-79) 40+ Apps 0 Goals
- (United States) Steve Reid (1978) 21 Apps 8 Goals
- (United States) John Roeslein (1976–77) 20 Apps 7 Goals
- (United States) Skip Roderick (1976–78) 53 Apps 1 Goal
- (Portugal) Antonio Simoes (1978) 12 Apps 0 Goals
- (Poland) Jerry Sularz (1977–78) 35 Apps 45 Goals Against
- (El Salvador) Carlos Velasquez (1977–78) 23+ Apps 3+ Goals
- (United States) Denny Vaninger (1979)

== Honors ==
ASL Season MVP

- 1977 Ringo Cantillo

ASL Rookie of the Year

- 1976: John Roeslein

'ASL Leading Goal Scorer

- 1977 Jose Neto (17 Goals)

ASL Leading Point Scorer

- 1977 Jose Neto (36 Points)

ASL All-Star Team

- 1977 Telmo Pires, Ringo Cantillo, Juan Cano, Jose Neto
