= Indiana Tigers =

American soccer club based in Gary, Indiana

The Gary Tigers were an American soccer club based in Gary, Indiana founded in 1973. The Gary Tigers were a member of the American Soccer League. For the 1974 season, the team was renamed the Indiana Tigers. Their head coach was Rosario Cammarata.

== Year-by-year ==
Year	Division	League	Reg. season	Playoffs	U.S. Open Cup
1973	2	ASL	3rd, Midwest	Did not qualify	Did not enter
1974	2	ASL	4th, Midwest	Did not qualify	Did not enter
