= New York Apollo =

American soccer club

The New York Greeks was an American soccer club based in New York City that was a member of the American Soccer League.

The team began as the amateur Greek-Americans. The club played lower Premier Division of the German American Soccer League which was based in the New York metropolitan area. The team won the Premier Division championship in 1950–51 and was promoted to the upper Major "Big 12" Division for the following season. Following their last place finish in the 1953–54 season, the club was relegated. The team was again promoted to the upper division for the 1960–61 season. The Greek-American Reserves team won the Dr. Manning Challenge Cup in 1954.

For the 1964–65 season, the club joined the "super-league" Eastern Professional Soccer Conference. After the EPSC folded at the end of its only season, the team returned to the GASL.

The club joined the ASL when it took over the inactive New York Inter franchise before the 1971 season. After the 1972 season, the club changed their name to the New York Apollo. Before the 1980 season, the team became the New York United.

== Coaches ==
- (United States) Gene Chyzowych (1976)
- (Romania) Ted Dumitru (1976–1980)
- (Romania) Virgil Mărdărescu (1980)
- (England) Rodney Marsh (1980)
- (Northern Ireland) Jimmy McGeough (1980–1981)

== Yearly awards ==
ASL All-Star Team

- 1977 – Paul Dawidczynski, Mario Garcia, Keith Van Eron
- 1978 – Chris Tyson
- 1979 – Chris Tyson
- 1980 – Chris Tyson
- 1981 – George Taratsides, Chris Tyson

== Year-by-year ==
Year	Division	League	Reg. season	Playoffs	U.S. Open Cup
1950–51	N/A	GASL (Premier)	1st	Champion (no playoff)	?
1951–52	N/A	GASL	5th	No playoff	?
1952–53	N/A	GASL	9th	No playoff	?
1953–54	N/A	GASL	12th	No playoff	?
1960–61	N/A	GASL	8th	No playoff	?
1961–62	N/A	GASL	8th	No playoff	?
1962–63	N/A	GASL	3rd	No playoff	?
1963–64	N/A	GASL	1st	Champion (no playoff)	?
1964–65	N/A	EPSC	6th, South	No playoff	?
1965–66	N/A	GASL	6th	No playoff	Quarterfinals
1966–67	N/A	GASL	4th(t)	No playoff	Champion
1967–68	N/A	GASL	1st	Champion (no playoff)	Champion
1968–69	N/A	GASL	1st	Champion (no playoff)	Champion
1969–70	N/A	GASL	1st, North	Champion	?
1971	2	ASL	1st	Champion (no playoff)	did not enter
1972	2	ASL	1st, Northern	Finals	did not enter
New York Apollo
1973	2	ASL	1st, Northeast	Champion	did not enter
1974	2	ASL	1st, East	Finals	did not enter
1975	2	ASL	1st, South	Co-champion	did not enter
1976	2	ASL	1st, East	Finals	did not enter
1977	2	ASL	2nd, East	Semifinals	did not enter
1978	2	ASL	1st, Eastern	Champion	did not enter
1979	2	ASL	6th, Eastern	did not qualify	did not enter
New York United
1980	2	ASL	2nd, National	Playoffs	did not enter
1981	2	ASL	1st, Liberty	Finals	did not enter
