= Rhode Island Oceaneers =

- Full name: Rhode Island Oceaneers
- Nickname: Oceaneers
- Founded: 1974
- Dissolved: 1977
- Capacity: 3,000

Rhode Island Oceaneers was an American soccer team based in East Providence, Rhode Island. They competed in the American Soccer League in the 1970s.

== History ==
The original Rhode Island Oceaneers soccer team was established in 1974. That season, they won the league title after a 16–2 regular season. U.S. Soccer Hall of Fame (1990) coach Manny Schellscheidt was named ASL Coach of the Year as the club outscored opponents 56–16.

For the 1977 season, the team was renamed the New England Oceaneers. Schellscheidt moved on to coach the New Jersey Americans, replaced by Massachusetts Hall of Famer (1999) John Bertos. After an 8–2–14 (8th of 9 teams) season, the team moved to Indianapolis, Indiana and became the Indianapolis Daredevils before folding after the 1979 season.

The original Oceaneers team played at Pierce Memorial Stadium in East Providence, Rhode Island as a member of the second version of the American Soccer League from 1974 to 1977.

== Year-by-year ==
Year	Division	League	Reg. season	Record (W-D-L)	Playoffs	U.S. Open Cup
1974	2	ASL	1st, Midwest	16-0-2	Champion	Did not enter
1975	2	ASL	2nd, North	8-9-3	1st Round	Did not enter
1976	2	ASL	2nd, East	9-3-9	Semifinal	Did not enter
1977	2	ASL	5th, East	8-2-14	Did not qualify	Did not enter

== Coaches ==
- Manny Schellscheidt: 1974
- John Bertos: 1977

== Honors ==
League Championship

- Winner (1): 1974

ASL Rookie of the Year

- 1976: (United States) John Roeslein

ASL Leading Goalkeeper

- 1975: (United States) Brad Steurer

ASL Coach of the Year

- 1974: (Germany) Manny Schellscheidt

== Notable players ==
- (Ghana) Mohammad Attiah
- (United States) Tony DiCicco
- (United States) Arnie Mausser
