= Cleveland Cobras =

American soccer club

The Cleveland Stars were an American soccer club based in Cleveland, Ohio and a member of the American Soccer League in 1972–73. Before the 1974 season, the name was changed to the Cleveland Cobras.

== Overview ==
The Stars' colors were blue and white. The Cobras' colors were green and gold, though in 1979 they also wore alternate uniforms of gold/black and in 1981 often donned green/white uniforms.

The Cobras actively promoted youth soccer. Hundreds of clinics and camps conducted by its players established a solid youth soccer base throughout northeast Ohio — though the club did not play long enough to reap the benefits of the kids growing up to becoming ticket-buying adults. The Cleveland Force (1978–88) and Cleveland Crunch/Force (1989–2005; 2020–present) indoor soccer teams capitalized with good crowds in the Major Indoor Soccer League, National Professional Soccer League and Major League Indoor Soccer.

The Cobras played home games on AstroTurf at George Finnie Stadium on the campus of Baldwin-Wallace College in Berea, Ohio. A few exhibition games were played at Cleveland Stadium. Each season, ownership brought top international clubs to town for "friendly" matches. Among those were the national teams of Poland, Israel and Canada, Cork Hibernians F.C. and Sligo Rovers F.C. (Ireland), GKS Tychy and Arka Gdynia (Poland), Beitar Jerusalem F.C. and Hapoel Jerusalem F.C. (Israel), Eintracht Braunschweig and VfB Oldenburg (Germany) and Partizan Belgrade (Serbia).

Management, consisting of local businessmen of moderate wealth who were soccer aficionados, tried to make up for a lack of finances with an abundance of enthusiasm. The club annually brought in numerous players from the largely ethnic Lake Erie Soccer League, which included among its many teams Belgrade United, Canton Hercules, Cleveland Inter, Cleveland Sannitics, Croatian Rebels, Donauschwaben Concordia, German Central Jets, German Kickers, Greek Olympic, Hrvat Knights, Hungarian Hunters, Karadjordje Stars, Latvian Hawks, Lazio Romans, Pan American Bulls, Polish Red Sox, Ukrainian Lions, Umoja Tigers, Warren Hellenics and Zagreb Rams.

Though highly skilled, the melting pot of LESL imports often proved to be as combative as they were competitive, at times failing to put aside their fierce nationalist loyalties. It made it difficult for the Cobras to mesh into a cohesive unit when players would not pass the ball to a new teammate, instead carrying a grudge borne from previous play in the LESL.

The Cobras' long-time general manager was Dr. John P. Gyekenyesi, a native of Hungary who grew up on Cleveland's east side. Gyekenyesi had earned his doctorate at Michigan State University, and had been an aerospace researcher at NASA for more than 35 years, also serving as president of the LESL before joining the Cobras.

Though the club was generally underfinanced, it had future wealth right in its locker room without realizing it in 1980. The 18-year-old son of Cleveland businessman Al Lerner expressed interest in sports and his father figured it would be good for the youngster to start at the bottom. Randy Lerner served as the Cobras' equipment manager, a glorified term for a locker-room assistant who picked up soiled towels and jerseys and did all sorts of mundane tasks. Randy Lerner succeeded his father as chairman of MBNA, owner of the Cleveland Browns of the National Football League, and later became chairman of the Aston Villa Football Club.

After the 1981 season, Cobras ownership sold its ASL rights to a group that moved the club to Atlanta, Georgia as the Georgia Generals.

== Year-by-year ==
Year	Division	League	Reg. season	W	L	T	GF	GA	Playoffs	Avg. attendance
Cleveland Stars
1972	2	ASL	2nd, Midwestern	6	2	0	21	16	did not qualify	
1973	2	ASL	2nd, Midwest	8	2	2	56	22	1st Round (L, Cincinnati, 4-1)	
Cleveland Cobras
1974	2	ASL	3rd, Midwest	8	7	3	28	28	did not qualify	
1975	2	ASL	1st, Midwest	10	7	3	43	45	1st Round (L, Boston, 2-2, 2-1)	3,056
1976	2	ASL	3rd, East	9	8	4	28	32	1st Round (L, Rhode Island, 2-1)	3,270
1977	2	ASL	3rd, East	9	13	2	29	41	did not qualify	
1978	2	ASL	5th, Eastern	7	13	4	27	55	did not qualify	3,368
1979	2	ASL	5th, Eastern	8	17	3	29	50	did not qualify	2,355
1980	2	ASL	3rd, National	12	14	2	47	47	did not qualify	
1981	2	ASL	4th, Freedom	5	22	1	33	78	did not qualify	

== Coaches ==
- (Italy) Olinto Busetto (1972–74)
- (Austria) (United States) Herbie Haller (1975–77, '81)
- (Scotland) Jackie Mudie (1978)
- (England) Jimmy Melia (1979)
- (England) Bob Ridley (1980)
- (Italy) Vito Colonna (1981)

== Honors ==
Rookie of the Year

- 1973: Doug McMillan
- 1980: Walter Schlothauer

Coach of the Year

- 1975: Herbie Haller
