= 1979 American Soccer League =

American Soccer League 1979 season
- Season: 1979
- Teams: 11
- Champions: Sacramento Gold
- Premiers: California Sunshine
- 1980 CONCACAF Champions' Cup: Sacramento Gold
- Top goalscorer: Joey Fink (15); Poli Garcia
- Highest scoring: Ian Filby (14 goals; 17 assists)
- Longest winning run: California Sunshine (13)
- Longest unbeaten run: California Sunshine (15)

Statistics of American Soccer League II in season 1979.

== League standings ==
Eastern Division
| Team | Pld | W | D | L | GF | GA | BP | Pts |
|---|---|---|---|---|---|---|---|---|
| Columbus Magic | 28 | 17 | 3 | 8 | 55 | 41 | 49 | 140 |
| New York Eagles | 28 | 14 | 7 | 7 | 49 | 35 | 46 | 130 |
| Pennsylvania Stoners | 28 | 13 | 5 | 10 | 50 | 38 | 45 | 120 |
| New Jersey Americans | 28 | 12 | 3 | 13 | 36 | 38 | 35 | 101 |
| Cleveland Cobras | 28 | 8 | 3 | 17 | 29 | 47 | 29 | 75 |
| New York Apollo | 28 | 6 | 4 | 18 | 30 | 45 | 26 | 64 |

Western Division
| Team | Pld | W | D | L | GF | GA | BP | Pts |
|---|---|---|---|---|---|---|---|---|
| California Sunshine | 28 | 22 | 3 | 3 | 63 | 29 | 57 | 173 |
| Sacramento Gold | 28 | 14 | 2 | 12 | 49 | 34 | 42 | 116 |
| Los Angeles Skyhawks | 28 | 13 | 4 | 11 | 42 | 44 | 41 | 114 |
| Indianapolis Daredevils | 28 | 8 | 3 | 17 | 35 | 58 | 32 | 78 |
| Las Vegas Seagulls | 28 | 7 | 3 | 18 | 28 | 54 | 28 | 69 |

== ASL All-Stars ==
| First Team | Position |
|---|---|
| Tom Reynolds, California | G |
| Ramon Moraldo, California | D |
| Daniel Mammana, Columbus | D |
| Anđelko Tešan, New York | D |
| Mickey Brown, Sacramento | D |
| Don Tobin, California | M |
| Clyde Watson, New York | M |
| Norman Piper, Columbus | M |
| Poli Garcia, California | F |
| Branko Samatovic, New York | F |
| Ian Filby, Sacramento | F |

== Playoffs ==
=== Bracket ===
Division semifinals
Sacramento Gold | 3
Los Angeles Skyhawks | 2
New York Eagles | 1
Pennsylvania Stoners | 2

Division finals (2-match aggregate)
California Sunshine | 0 | 0 | 0
Sacramento Gold | 0 | 1 | 1
Columbus Magic | 1 | 1(4) | 2
Pennsylvania Stoners | 1 | 1(3) | 2

ASL Championship Final
Sacramento Gold | 1
Columbus Magic | 0

=== Division semifinals ===
| August 29 | Sacramento Gold | 3–2 (OT) | Los Angeles Skyhawks | Hughes Stadium • 7,223 |

| August 29 | New York Eagles | 1–2 | Pennsylvania Stoners | Bleecker Stadium • Att. ??? |

=== Division finals ===
| Higher seed | Aggregate | Lower seed | First leg | Second leg | Attendance |
|---|---|---|---|---|---|
| Columbus Magic | 2–2 | Pennsylvania Stoners | 1–1 | 1–1 (4–3) | September 4 • ASD Stadium • 7,048; September 9 • Franklin County Stadium • 4,306 |
| California Sunshine | 0–1 | Sacramento Gold | 0–0 | 0–1 | September 2 • Hughes Stadium • 10,762; September 8 • Murdock Stadium • 2,200 |

=== Championship final ===
September 16, 1979

| Columbus Magic (OH) | 0–1 | Sacramento Gold (CA) |
|---|---|---|
| | Report 1 Report 2 | Ian Filby 83:22' |

Franklin County Stadium, Columbus, Ohio
Attendance: 9,378
Referee: (USA)
