= Peta Bala'c =

English footballer

Personal information
- Full name: Peta John Bala'c
- Date of birth: 9 December 1953 (age 72)
- Place of birth: Exeter, England
- Positions: Goalkeeper; midfielder

Youth career
- 1960–1963: Exeter City
- 1963–1972: Plymouth Argyle

Senior career*
Years	Team	Apps	(Gls)
1971–1974	Plymouth Argyle	40	(0)
1973	→ Hereford United (loan)	2	(0)
1973–1974	→ Swansea City (loan)	4	(0)
1974–1976	Durban City	84	(0)
1977–1978	Durban United	28	(0)
1979	Lusitano	34	(0)
1980	Sacramento Gold (loan)	27	(0)
1980	Sporting CP	15	(0)
1981–1986	Kaizer Chiefs	170	(0)
1986–????	Torrington		
- Shell Swan
- Chester Nomad Sixths
Total		404	(0)
- * Club domestic league appearances and goals

Peta Bala'c (born 9 December 1953) is an English former professional footballer who played as a goalkeeper, most notably for Kaizer Chiefs in South Africa.

== Playing career ==
=== Plymouth Argyle ===
Born in Exeter, England, Bala'c played at the Exeter City and Plymouth Argyle youth academies. He graduated to the reserve team after his performances in the 1969 FA Youth Cup especially in a first round win over Torquay United. He made his professional debut on 8 January 1972 in a 4–0 win over York City starting the match for an ill Jim Furnell. He became a regular for over a year before Furnell returned. He played his last match on 4 November 1972 in a 7–1 loss to Oldham Athletic. Bala'c is described as a keeper who was quite acrobatic but was held back by his height. Bala'c played in the second half in a friendly match against Santos FC on 14 March 1973 where he only conceded a penalty from Pelé which was a consolation goal for Santos. Even before it was taken, the Santos players started walking to the centre line awaiting kick off, because they knew he wouldn't miss. Santos lost 3–1. The Santos squad had the likes of Edu, Carlos Alberto and Clodoaldo who all won the 1970 FIFA World Cup with Brazil. He got a call-up to the England youth team. He left after a falling out with new manager Tony Waiters. In June 2012, he was nominated as one of Argyle's Greatest Goalkeepers along Pat Dunne, Jim Furnell, Milija Aleksic, Geoff Crudgington and Rhys Wilmot.

=== Durban United ===
Bala'c played with England players such as Johnny Haynes, Alan Ball and George Best in Durban.

=== Lusitano ===
Bala'c lost his place to Bruce Grobbelaar who he had been friends with during his spell at Liverpool. He described Eusébio's presence as a highlight of his career.

=== America and Portugal ===
Bala'c had brief spells with Sacramento Gold and Sporting CP winning the ASL Championship in 1980 under coach Bill Williams with fellow countrymen Ian Filby, Bobby Arber and Gordon Fearnley.

=== Kaizer Chiefs ===
Bala'c was persuaded by Tony Waiters to go to South Africa. He joined Kaizer Chiefs in the famous 1981 quadruple winning season and won thirteen trophies in five years not losing a single cup final and set an unofficial world record of 21 consecutive clean sheets. The record was unofficial because South Africa had not been admitted to FIFA until 1992. He is infamously remembered for conceding a free-kick from the halfway line from Mlungisi Ngubane in 1984.

=== Later career ===
Bala'c came back to play in the Devon South Western League under Johnny Hore in 1986 and played as a midfielder for Shell Swan and Chester Nomad Sixths in Division Two and the Chester Sunday League until retiring in his fifties. He converted to midfielder after being inspired by Kaizer Chiefs' one touch play.

== After retirement ==
Bala'c lives near Chester with his wife. He currently works for Kitchens by Anthony in Hoole, Chester. He played Plymouth Argyle Legends match against BBC XI and Liverpool at Dean Cross Plymstock in aid of the Chestnut Appeal for prostate cancer in Devon & Cornwall. Balac also played cricket for Chester Boughton Hall Cricket Club and Newbury Cricket Club as a fielder until the age of 60, playing 24 league games between 2010 and 2013 making 12 catches.
