= Mammana =

Mammana is an Italian surname with major distribution in Italy, the United States, Argentina, and Brazil. Its literal meaning in Italian is "midwife." Primary locations for unrelated Mammana families are Castel di Lucio in Messina, Pachino in Syracuse, Centuripe in Enna, Caltanissetta and San Cataldo in Caltanissetta, and Valledolmo in Palermo.

Notable people with the surname include:

- Daniel Mammana, Argentine footballer
- Dennis Mammana (born 1951), American astronomy writer, lecturer, and sky photographer
- Emanuel Mammana (born 1996), Argentine footballer
- Joe Mammana, Italian-American philanthropist
- Richard Mammana (born 1979), American ecumenist and writer

The surname is also spelled Mammano, Mamana, Momano (particularly in Rochester, New York), and has been Americanized as Mann, Manners, and Manning.

== Bibliography ==
- La mammana istruita per validamente amministrare il S. Sagramento del battesimo in caso di necessità alle creature nascenti (Trent, 1760). Treatise for midwives on the valid administration of baptism after birth in cases of necessity.
