= Sacramento Gold =

Sacramento Gold may refer to:

- Sacramento Gold (1976–1980)
- Sacramento Gold FC, since 2009
