= Frank Vizcarra =

Mexican footballer

Personal information
- Full name: Frank Vizcarra
- Date of birth: September 20, 1955 (age 71)
- Place of birth: Tijuana, Mexico
- Position: Midfielder

Youth career
- 1977–1978: Ohio State Buckeyes

Senior career*
Years	Team	Apps	(Gls)
1979	Columbus Magic		
1980–1981	Denver Avalanche (indoor)	15	(6)
1983	San Diego Sockers (indoor)	9	(2)
- * Club domestic league appearances and goals

Frank Vizcarra is a Mexican retired footballer who played as a midfielder in the American Soccer League and Major Indoor Soccer League.

== Soccer ==
Vizcarra attended Ohio State University where he played on the men's soccer team in 1977 and 1978. He graduated with a bachelor's degree in education. In 1979, the Portland Timbers selected Vizcarra in the third round of the North American Soccer League draft. The Timbers released him during the pre-season and he signed with the Columbus Magic of the American Soccer League. On September 29, 1980, the expansion Denver Avalanche of the Major Indoor Soccer League held an open tryout. Vizcarra attended and was one of three players signed. The Avalanche folded at the end of the season in 1982. On January 20, 1983, Vizcarra signed with the San Diego Sockers who were then playing in the MISL.

== Post soccer career ==
After retiring from soccer, Vizcarra became a manager for Pizza Hut. In 1985, McDonald's hired him. Over the years, he moved up from being a restaurant manager to Vice President of Strategy, Innovation and Franchise Relations for the U.S. market where he led the team that created the U.S. Plan to Win that led to the turnaround of the U.S. business. He was later promoted to Vice President of Strategy in the Restaurant Support Group. In this role he designed the restructure of the European market and APMEA for their respective presidents. He also served as a strategic advisor to the president and chief operating officer. Vizcarra retired from McDonald's in 2006. After his retirement, he founded Vizcarra Consulting Group, which focuses on helping chief executive officers develop business strategy. He and his wife, Anita, co-founded the College Success Program with the Barrio Logan College Institute to help underprivileged students attend college and break their cycle of poverty. He also is the president of The Opportunity Foundation which is being built to help establish college scholarship programs for underprivileged students. Vizcarra serves on the boards of Del Taco, the Salvation Army, Lead Like Jesus, and is on the advisory board of several start-ups.
