= The Father of Columbus Baseball =

Sculpture in Columbus, Ohio, U.S.

- The sculpture in 2018
- Artist: Alan Hamwi
- Year: 2009
- Medium: Bronze sculpture
- Subject: Harold Cooper
- Location: Columbus, Ohio, United States
- 39°58′5.9″N 83°0′35.6″W

The Father of Columbus Baseball is a bronze sculpture depicting Harold Cooper by Alan Hamwi, installed outside Huntington Park (whose predecessor stadium was in named in his honor for) in Columbus, Ohio's Arena District, in the United States. The statue was unveiled in 2009.

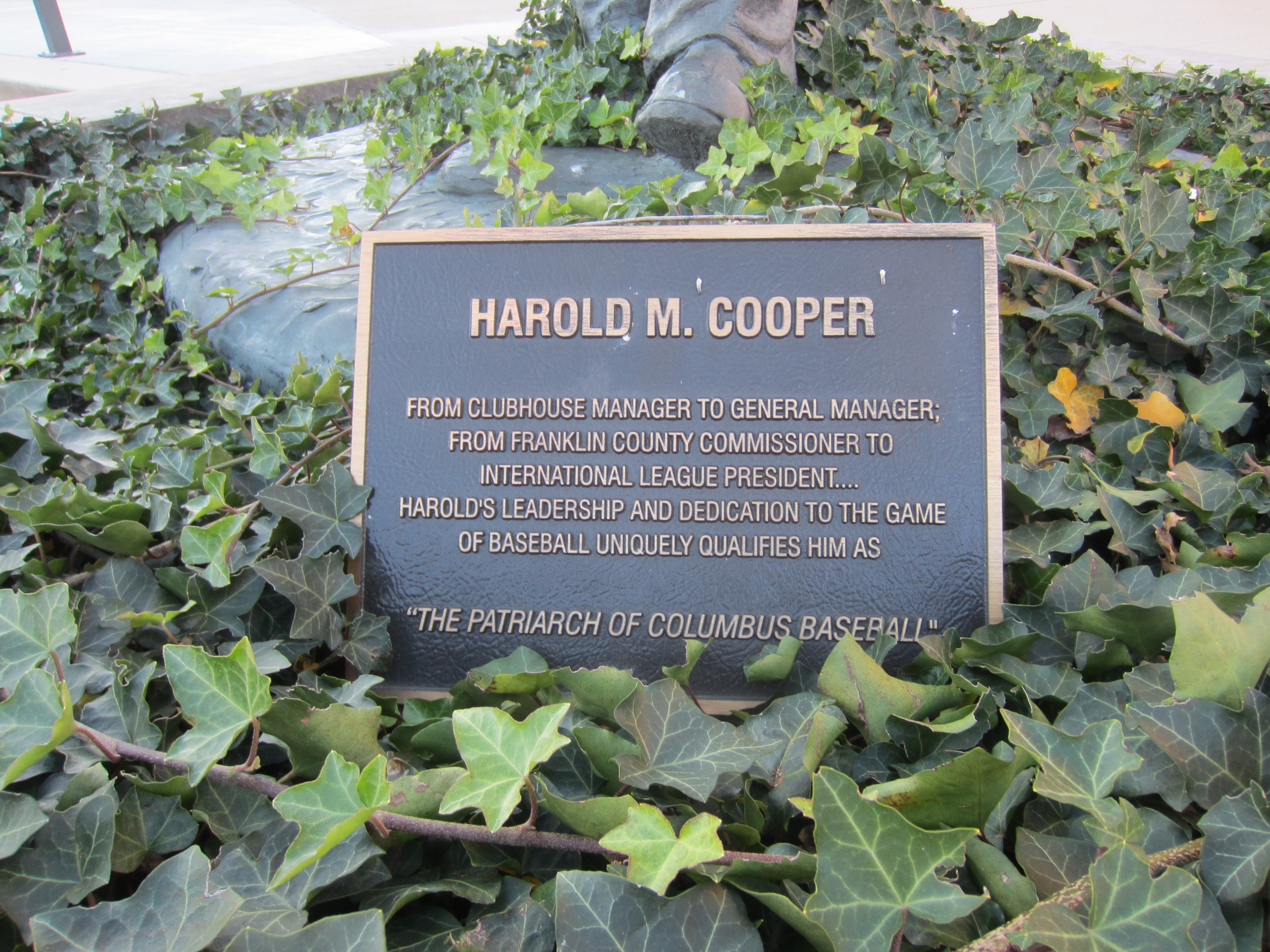
Plaque

== See also ==
- 2009 in art
