= Bob Rohrbach =

American soccer player (born 1955)

Personal information
- Date of birth: April 2, 1955 (age 71)
- Place of birth: Garden City, New York, United States
- Date of death: October 11, 2025 (aged 70)
- Place of death: Houston, Texas, United States
- Position: Forward

Youth career
- 1973–1977: Dayton Flyers

Senior career*
Years	Team	Apps	(Gls)
1977	New York Cosmos	0	(0)
1978	Colorado Caribous	26	(6)
1979	Detroit Express	8	(4)
1979–1980	Pittsburgh Spirit (indoor)	13	(2)
1979–1980	Hartford Hellions (indoor)	3	(1)
1980	Columbus Magic		
- * Club domestic league appearances and goals

Bob Rohrbach (2 April 1955 - 11 October 2025) was an American professional soccer forward who spent three seasons in the North American Soccer League, one in the Major Indoor Soccer League and one in the American Soccer League.

As an excellent basketball player his senior season in high school, Rohrbach attempted to gain an athletic scholarship. When no schools expressed an interest, he decided to attend the University of Dayton and walk on with the basketball team. During pre-season practices, he decided to also try out with the school's soccer team. He played on the men's soccer team from 1973 to 1977 scoring 69 goals career goals. He was inducted into the school's Hall of Fame in 1993. He turned professional in 1977 with the New York Cosmos of the North American Soccer League, but saw no first team time. In 1978, he moved to the Colorado Caribous where he was a regular starter. He went to the Detroit Express in 1979. In 1979, he began the Major Indoor Soccer League season with the Pittsburgh Spirit but finished it with the Hartford Hellions.

In April 1980, he was playing for the Columbus Magic when he collided heads with a player from the Cleveland Cobras. The collision put him into a coma for four days and ended his soccer career.

In the early 1990s, he co-owned an oil field equipment company, R&R Procurement.
