= Ian Filby =

English footballer (1954–2024)

Personal information
- Full name: Ian Frederick Filby
- Date of birth: 9 October 1954 (age 72)
- Place of birth: Woodford, England
- Date of death: September 2024 (aged 69)
- Height: 5 ft 10 in (1.78 m)
- Position: Forward

Youth career
- 1971–1972: Orient

Senior career*
Years	Team	Apps	(Gls)
1972–1975	Orient	0	(0)
1973	→ Montreal Olympique (loan)	19	(3)
1974	→ Brentford (loan)	3	(0)
1974	→ St Mirren (loan)	0	(0)
	→ Romford (loan)	5	(1)
1976–1978	Durban City		
1979	Lusitano		
1979–1980	Sacramento Gold	42	(25)
1980	Pennsylvania Stoners		
1981	California Surf	1	(0)
- * Club domestic league appearances and goals

Ian Frederick Filby (9 October 1954 – September 2024) was an English professional footballer who played as a forward for a number of clubs in England, South Africa and North America.

== Career ==
=== Early years ===
Filby began his career in the youth system at Second Division club Orient and signed his first professional contract on his 18th birthday in October 1972. He later won the London Challenge Cup with the reserve team in 1972 and 1973. Filby moved to Canada to join North American Soccer League club Montreal Olympique on loan for the 1973 season. Manager Graham Adams commented that Filby was faster and had better ball control than the previous season's highly rated Scottish player Graeme Souness. Despite the build-up, Filby managed just three goals in Olympique's 19 regular season games. Filby was loaned to Brentford, St Mirren and Romford during the 1974–75 season and departed Orient at the end of the campaign.

=== South Africa ===
Filby moved to South Africa in 1976 and played for National Football League and National Premier Soccer League clubs Durban City and Lusitano.

=== United States ===
Filby returned to North America to sign for American Soccer League club Sacramento Gold in 1979. He had a good 1979 season, finishing the campaign as the league's top scorer (with 45 points) and winning the championship (after a 1–0 victory over Columbus Magic in the final) and being named on the league's All-Star team. Filby scored 11 goals in the 1980 season, before transferring to American Soccer League club Pennsylvania Stoners midway through the season. He won his second successive championship with the Stoners, beating former club Sacramento Gold 2–1 in the final. Filby returned to the North American Soccer League to sign for California Surf in 1981. After retiring from professional play, Filby remained in Northern California and continued to play in the amateur Central California Soccer League.

== Personal life ==
Filby's brother Malcolm was also a footballer and the pair played together at Sacramento Gold and California Surf.

== Career statistics ==
Appearances and goals by club, season and competition
Club	Season	League			National cup		League cup		Total	
Club	Season	Division	Apps	Goals	Apps	Goals	Apps	Goals	Apps	Goals
Montreal Olympique (loan)	1973	North American Soccer League	19	3	—		—		19	3
Brentford (loan)	1974–75	Fourth Division	3	0	—		—		3	0
Sacramento Gold	1979	American Soccer League	26	14	—		—		26	14
California Surf	1981	North American Soccer League	1	0	—		—		1	0
Career total			49	17	0	0	—		49	17

== Honours ==
Orient Reserves

- London Challenge Cup: 1971–72, 1972–73

Sacramento Gold

- American Soccer League: 1979

Pennsylvania Stoners

- American Soccer League: 1980

Individual

- American Soccer League All-Star: 1979
