= Waad Hirmez =

Iraqi-American football player

Personal information
- Birth name: Waad Ajou
- Date of birth: October 28, 1961 (age 65)
- Place of birth: Baghdad, Iraq
- Height: 5 ft 8 in (1.73 m)
- Positions: Forward; midfielder; defender

Senior career*
Years	Team	Apps	(Gls)
1981	San Diego Sockers	1	(0)
1983	San Diego Sockers	11	(1)
1985–1988	San Diego Sockers (indoor)	149	(69)
1988–1989	Los Angeles Lazers (indoor)	27	(11)
1989–1991	San Diego Sockers (indoor)	113	(87)
1991	Baltimore Blast (indoor)	5	(3)
1991	St. Louis Storm (indoor)	24	(6)
1993	San Diego Sockers (indoor)		
1994	Kansas City Attack (indoor)	8	(5)
1994	Puebla (indoor)		
1994	San Diego Sockers (indoor)	25	(20)
1995	Monterrey La Raza (indoor)	26	(17)
- * Club domestic league appearances and goals

Waad Hirmez (Arabic: وَعْد هُرْمُز), born as Waad Ajou (Arabic: وَعْد عَجُو), is a retired Iraqi-American football player who spent most of his professional career in the North American Soccer League and Major Indoor Soccer League.

== Early life ==
In 1979, Hirmez, an Assyrian Catholic native of Iraq, moved to San Diego to live with an uncle while he attended high school. When he arrived in the United States, he changed his name from Waad Ajou to Waad Hirmez. In 1981, he graduated from Point Loma High School.

== Professional soccer career ==
Two weeks after his graduation, he signed with the San Diego Sockers of the North American Soccer League for $18,000. He played seventeen minutes of one game for the Sockers in 1981 before being released. He then attended National University where he played on the school's club team. In 1982, he played for the amateur San Diego Falcons. In 1983, the Sockers signed Hirmez again and he played eleven games, scoring one goal. He did not play professionally in 1984 after a series of unsuccessful trials with the Tacoma Stars, Phoenix Inferno and Wichita Wings. In February 1985, the Sockers signed Hirmez to a ten-day contract after the team captain, Kaz Deyna, suffered a potentially season-ending knee injury. His contract was extended to the end of the season as the Sockers won the league championship. The Sockers then retained Hirmez for the next three seasons as the Sockers won another two championships. Hirmez became a free agent in 1988 and he moved to the Los Angeles Lazers. On February 21, 1989, the Lazers traded him to the Sockers in exchange for Poli Garcia. He would play two and a half indoor seasons with the Sockers.

Trading cards of Waad Hirmez were produced by Pacific Trading Cards, from 1987 through 1992.

In addition to his time playing indoor soccer with the Sockers, Hirmez also played for the San Diego Nomads of the outdoor Western Soccer League. Although the Nomads went to the league championship, Hirmez had returned to the Sockers before that game. In 1989, Hirmez also became an American citizen. In September 1991, the Sockers waived Hirmez. On September 20, 1991, he signed with the Baltimore Blast. On November 16, 1991, the Blast placed Hirmez on waivers. On November 30, Hirmez joined the St. Louis Storm. The Storm released him at the end of the season. In 1993, Hirmez rejoined the Sockers who were now playing in the Continental Indoor Soccer League. In January 1994, he signed with the Kansas City Attack of the National Professional Soccer League. He then moved to Mexico where he played for Puebla in the Futbol Rapido league, helping the team win the league championship. He then returned to the Sockers for the 1994 CISL season. The Sockers waived him at the end of the season and Hirmez moved to the Monterrey La Raza for the 1995 season.

== Post-playing career ==
=== Semi-professional coaching career ===
In 2005, Hirmez served as Head Coach of the San Diego Fusion, in the PDL.

=== High school coaching career ===
After retiring from playing, Hirmez became the boys' varsity soccer coach at St Augustine Private Catholic School in San Diego in 1997–1998. Beginning in 2003, he was the varsity coach of the Fallbrook Union High School boys soccer team. In 2014, Hirmez was named the head varsity soccer coach at Chaparral High School (Temecula, California)

=== Youth soccer coaching career ===
From 2001 through 2003, Hirmez was the Program Director and Coach of the Southwest Soccer Club, where he coached the BU14, BU15 and BU16 teams. In 2002 his Boys U16 team won the Cal South State Cup Championship defeating PQ Premier Red. His BU16 team won the 2002 League Cup Championship and 2003 Surf Cup Championship and was a semi-finalist at the National Cup.

In 2014 Hirmez rejoined Southwest Soccer Club, taking over a team with a previous losing record, and coaching the Boys U12 team in the Coast League - Bronze East, finishing with a winning record of 6-5-1 and making a Cal South State Cup Championship appearance. Coach Hirmez' 2014/15 BU12 team advanced farther in the State Cup than any other Temecula Valley-based BU12 team, losing to a team from Irvine after double overtime on penalty kicks.
