= Derek Lawther =

American soccer coach

Derek Lawther is a soccer coach and businessman. He began his career in professional soccer as a player in Northern Ireland. After migrating to the United States, he developed his coaching talents and went on to coach the US Olympic team as well as several professional American soccer teams. Lawther is an American Youth Soccer Association (AYSO) Area Coach Administrator and an executive in a soccer education company.

== Early years ==
Lawther was born in Belfast, County Down, Northern Ireland on 20 August 1936. He is the eldest of three children. His brother, Ian played for the Northern Ireland. Like most young Irish lads, Lawther played soccer for his elementary school teams.

== Player experience ==
In 1950, Boyland Boys' Club accepted Lawther to their team and organisation. Shortly thereafter, his Boyland coach advised him to leave school, as it was certain his future was in soccer. Lawther followed his advice, left school and became an apprentice printer to pursue his playing career. At this time in Northern Ireland, it was a common practice for a soccer player to have a day job and then practice at night. The companies hiring these players understood the commitment undertaken and gladly provided time off for games and travel.

Lawther played with several prominent Irish teams as a centre mid-fielder. He began in his teens playing with Ballymena United. In 1954 he signed with Linfield, the most prominent team in Northern Ireland. 1956 saw Derek signing with Glenavon yet another distinguished Irish League team. It was with Glenavon that he earned his Amateur International cap versus Scotland in 1958. He finished his ten-year Irish playing career with Bangor in 1962.

In 1963, the day after the assassination of US President John F. Kennedy, Lawther arrived in California to play for Scandia Soccer Club. He advanced his education in computer science at El Camino College in Torrance, California. He briefly returned to Northern Ireland after the Watts riots of 1965 to play with Cliftonville. When Lawther returned to the United States after the unrest in Northern Ireland, he played and coached for the Santa Monica Soccer and Social Club (SMSSC) which played in the greater Los Angeles League.

== Coaching ==
While Lawther was playing for SMSSC, he worked as a computer programmer and once again started a new life. He possesses a style and demeanor that enables him to be an effective communicator and motivator. To stay with the sport he loves and give back to the game, he started taking courses for his coaching credentials in 1971. He completed all coursework and received the following certifications:

- USSF 70 hour course, UCLA, Los Angeles, 1971 – Certificate 'C'
- USSF 70-hour course, UCLA, Los Angeles, 1972 – Certificate 'B'
- USSF 70-hour course, Stanford University, 1973 – Certificate 'A'
- USSF 70-hour course, Colorado Springs, 1974 – Staff Certificate

== Early coaching experience ==
Lawther bought a new home in Fountain Valley, California in 1973 and started coaching youth teams. His style, skills and affection for youth development have made him a highly successful coach. He coached teams in the California Youth Soccer Association – South and became a District Coach. In 1976, he coached the Fountain Valley Eagles (U19) to a third-place finish in the national tournament. One of the players on that team, Rick Davis, eventually went on to play professional soccer, became a member of the Olympic and World Cup teams, and ultimately entered the AYSO Hall of Fame.

Lawther demonstrated his love and ability to work with young, amateur players when he coached youth, club and college level programs. He was chosen to coach the United States national B team in 1978 when they participated in the President's Cup in South Korea. The following year he coached the United States men's national team when they played against Mexico in Los Angeles and Russia in Seattle.

== College coaching experience ==
In 1978, he began coaching at the college level and successfully took Santa Ana College men's team to the California State championship. In 1983, after coaching professional teams, he began coaching at the University of California, Irvine. The first year there he coached both the men's and women's team with the Los Angeles Times dubbing him as the "soccer guru". From 1984 to 1995, he coached the men's team in Division I competition in the Big West Conference (formerly the Pacific Coast Athletic Association). His success at UCI was recognised with many awards and accolades. He was named Big West Coach of the Year in 1991. The Mountain Pacific Sports Federation represents the Big West, Pacific-10, Mountain West, Western Athletic and West Coast Conferences and other selected universities in the western United States. In 1994, it named Lawther as Coach of the Year.

Lawther maintained his relationships with youth sports organisations. He was South District Coach in the California Youth Soccer Association – South from 1974 to 1981. In 1981, he was the California State boys' coach that won the Nike Cup for the U19 division. He became the American Youth Soccer Association (AYSO) Area Coach Administrator. A position he still holds and enjoys. He also coached the Corona Del Mar High School boys' team for four years in the late nineties. He is still active in coaching club teams.

== Professional coaching ==
His national success as a coach was recognised when the professional American Soccer League was formed and he was named head coach of the California Sunshine team. He garnered the American Soccer League Coach of the Year for 1978. In 1980, he joined the North American Soccer League's California Surf as a coach. The team was 2nd in the American Conference, Western Division.

== Business experience ==
In 2005, several soccer-minded investors convinced Lawther to expand his soccer influence by creating multimedia tools to improve the soccer skills and knowledge of the game. This group started a company to provide soccer expertise, training, and travel to advance the sport of soccer in the United States.

Previously, in addition to his coaching positions, Lawther started his own company that has been dedicated to the education of both soccer players and coaches since its inception in 1973.
