= 1980 CONCACAF Champions' Cup =

16th edition of premier club football tournament organized by CONCACAF

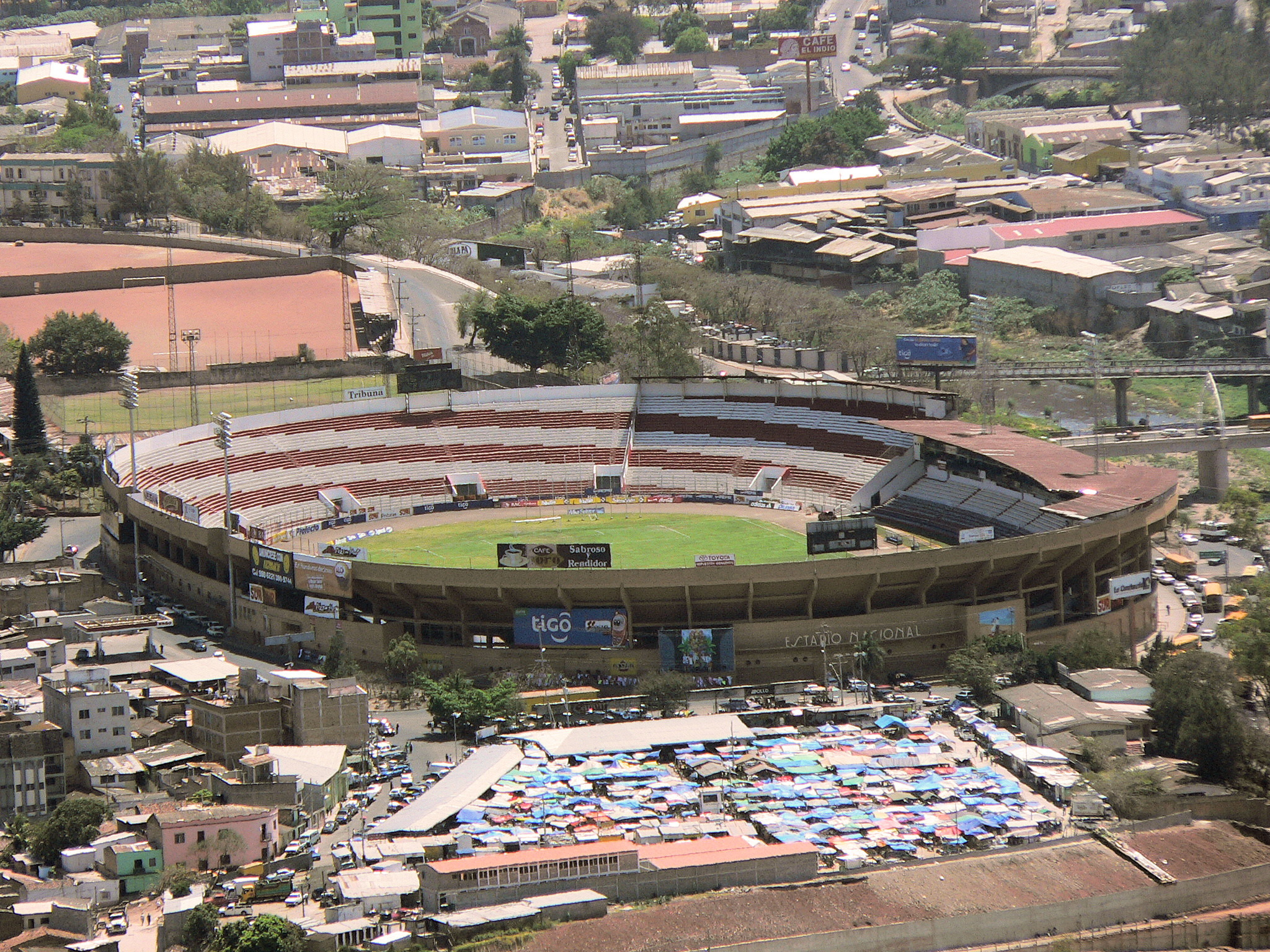
- Estadio Nacional in Tegucigalpa hosted the final round

Tournament details
- Dates: 20 May 1980 – 12 February 1981
- Teams: 18

Final positions
- Champions: (Mexico) UNAM (1st title)
- Runners-up: (Honduras) UNAH

Tournament statistics
- Matches played: 33
- Goals scored: 92 (2.79 per match)

The 1980 CONCACAF Champions' Cup was the 16th edition of the CONCACAF Champions' Cup, the premier football club competition organized by CONCACAF, the regional governing body of North America, Central America, and the Caribbean.

UNAM won the final round, becoming CONCACAF club champions for the first time in their history.

== Teams ==
The following 18 teams (from ten associations) qualified for the tournament.

- North American Zone: 5 teams (from three associations)
- Central American Zone: 8 teams (from four associations)
- Caribbean Zone: 6 teams (from six associations)

Qualified teams for 1980 CONCACAF Champions' Cup
Teams
(Mexico) Cruz Azul (1st)	(Mexico) UNAM (2nd)
(United States) Sacramento Gold (1st)	(United States) Brooklyn Dodgers (1st)
(Costa Rica) Herediano (1st)	(Costa Rica) Cartaginés (2nd)
(El Salvador) Águila (1st)	(El Salvador) Santiagueño (2nd)
(Guatemala) Comunicaciones (1st)	(Guatemala) Cobán Imperial (2nd)
(Honduras) Marathón (1st)	(Honduras) UNAH (2nd)
(Netherlands Antilles) Jong Colombia (1st)	(Netherlands Antilles) SUBT (2nd)
(Suriname) Robinhood (1st)	(Suriname) Transvaal (2nd)
(Trinidad and Tobago) Police (1st)	(Trinidad and Tobago) Defence Force (2nd)
(Bermuda) Hotels International (1st)	

== Format ==
The teams were split into 3 zones (North American, Central American and Caribbean), each one qualifying the winner to the final tournament, that was played in Tegucigalpa, Honduras under a group system. All the qualifying matches in the tournament were played under the home/away match system.

== Schedule ==
Phase	Round	First leg	Second leg
Qualifying	First qualifying round	20 May – 22 June 1980	29 May – 2 June 1980
Qualifying	Second qualifying round	22 June – 2 November 1980	29 June – 16 November 1980
Qualifying	Third qualifying round	6 November 1980	13 November 1980
Final round	Match 1	8 February 1981	
Final round	Match 2	10 February 1981	
Final round	Match 3	12 February 1981	

== First round ==
North America Zone

Team 1	Agg.	Team 2	1st leg	2nd leg
UNAM (Mexico)	w/o (Note: Both matches between UNAM and Sacramento Gold were cancelled due to the withdrawal of Sacramento Gold from the competition. UNAM advanced to the third round on a walkover. The results are those listed by CONCACAF; It is stated in the RSSSF that there is no evidence that these games were played.)	(United States) Sacramento Gold	Cancelled	Cancelled
Brooklyn Dodgers (United States)	3–2	(Bermuda) Hotels International FC	2–2	1–0

=== North America Zone ===
UNAM (Mexico)	Cancelled (w/o)	(United States) Sacramento Gold

Sacramento Gold (United States)	Cancelled (w/o)	(Mexico) UNAM

UNAM advanced to the third round after Sacramento Gold withdrew from the competition

22 June 1980

Brooklyn Dodgers (United States)	2–2	(Bermuda) Hotels International

29 June 1980

Hotels International (Bermuda)	0–1	(United States) Brooklyn Dodgers

Brooklyn Dodgers won 3–2 on aggregate; advanced to the second round.

Central America Zone

Team 1	Agg.	Team 2	1st leg	2nd leg
Cobán Imperial (Guatemala)	2–2 (d.)	(Honduras) UNAH	2–1	0–1
Santiagueño (El Salvador)	w/o	(Costa Rica) Cartaginés	Cancelled	Cancelled
Comunicaciones (Guatemala)	5–2	(El Salvador) Águila	2–0	3–2
Marathón (Honduras)	4–3	(Costa Rica) Herediano	3–0	1–3

=== Central America Zone ===
Torneo Centroamericano de Concacaf 1980

20 May 1980

Cobán Imperial (Guatemala)	2–1	(Honduras) UNAH
own goal Luis Condomi

Estadio José Ángel Rossi, Cobán
11 June 1980

UNAH (Honduras)	1–0	(Guatemala) Cobán Imperial

Estadio Nacional Chelato Uclés, Tegucigalpa

UNAH advanced to the third round after protesting the drawing of lots; which originally saw Cobán Imperial advance.

Cartaginés (Costa Rica)	Cancelled (w/o)	(El Salvador) Santiagueño

Santiagueño (El Salvador)	Cancelled (w/o)	(Costa Rica) Cartaginés

Santiagueño advanced to the third round after Cartaginés withdrew from the competition

22 May 1980

Comunicaciones (Guatemala)	2–0	(El Salvador) Águila

Estadio Doroteo Guamuch Flores, Guatemala City
29 May 1980

Águila (El Salvador)	2–3	(Guatemala) Comunicaciones
		Ramón A. Ramírez; Enrique Sánchez

Estadio Juan Francisco Barraza, San Miguel

Comunicaciones won 5–2 on aggregate.

4 June 1980

Marathón (Honduras)	3–0	(Costa Rica) Herediano
Germán Bernárdez

Estadio Francisco Morazán, San Pedro Sula
15 June 1980

Herediano (Costa Rica)	3–1	(Honduras) Marathón

Estadio Eladio Rosabal Cordero, Heredia

Marathón won 4–3 on aggregate.

Caribbean Zone

Team 1	Agg.	Team 2	1st leg	2nd leg
SUBT (Netherlands Antilles)	2–5	(Suriname) Robinhood	2–1	0–4
Transvaal (Suriname)	4–2	(Trinidad and Tobago) Police	3–1	1–1

=== Caribbean Zone ===
8 June 1980

SUBT (Netherlands Antilles)	2–1	(Suriname) Robinhood

22 June 1980

Robinhood (Suriname)	4–0	(Netherlands Antilles) SUBT

Robinhood won 5–2 on aggregate.

22 June 1980

Transvaal (Suriname)	3–1	(Trinidad and Tobago) Police

29 June 1980

Police (Trinidad and Tobago)	1–1	(Suriname) Transvaal

Transvaal won 4–2 on aggregate.

== Second round ==
North America Zone

Team 1	Agg.	Team 2	1st leg	2nd leg
Cruz Azul (Mexico)	12–3	(United States) Brooklyn Dodgers	9–1	3–2

=== North America Zone ===
10 September 1980

Cruz Azul (Mexico)	9–1	(United States) Brooklyn Dodgers

13 September 1980

Brooklyn Dodgers (United States)	2–3	(Mexico) Cruz Azul

Cruz Azul won 12–3 on aggregate; advanced to the third round.

Central America Zone

Team 1	Agg.	Team 2	1st leg	2nd leg
Comunicaciones (Guatemala)	1–5	(Honduras) Marathón	1–1	0–4
UNAH (Honduras)	5–3	(El Salvador) Santiagueño	2–2	3–1 (a.e.t.)

=== Central America Zone ===
Torneo Centroamericano de Concacaf 1980

21 September 1980

Comunicaciones (Guatemala)	1–1	(Honduras) Marathón

Estadio Francisco Morazán, San Pedro Sula
24 September 1980

Marathón (Honduras)	4–0	(Guatemala) Comunicaciones

Estadio Doroteo Guamuch Flores, Guatemala City

Marathón won 5–1 on aggregate.

24 September 1980

Santiagueño (El Salvador)	2–2	(Honduras) UNAH
Ever Hernandez; Jorge Gonzalez		David Bueso; Daniel Sambula

Estadio Cuscatlán, San Salvador
28 September 1980

UNAH (Honduras)	3–1	(El Salvador) Santiagueño
David Bueso; Mario Lopez		Jorge Gonzalez

Estadio Nacional Chelato Uclés, Tegucigalpa

UNAH won 5–3 on aggregate.

Caribbean Zone

Team 1	Agg.	Team 2	1st leg	2nd leg
Jong Colombia (Netherlands Antilles)	0–5	(Suriname) Transvaal	0–1	0–4
Robinhood (Suriname)	4–3	(Trinidad and Tobago) Defence Force	2–1	2–2

=== Caribbean Zone ===
2 November 1980

Jong Colombia (Netherlands Antilles)	0–1	(Suriname) Transvaal

16 November 1980

Transvaal (Suriname)	4–0	(Netherlands Antilles) Jong Colombia

Transvaal won 5–0 on aggregate.

2 November 1980

Robinhood (Suriname)	2–1	(Trinidad and Tobago) Defence Force

19 November 1980

Defence Force (Trinidad and Tobago)	2–2	(Suriname) Robinhood

Robinhood won 4–3 on aggregate.

== Third round ==
North America Zone

Team 1	Agg.	Team 2	1st leg	2nd leg
UNAM (Mexico)	4–1	(Mexico) Cruz Azul	1–0	3–1

=== North America Zone ===
6 November 1980

UNAM (Mexico)	1–0	(Mexico) Cruz Azul

13 November 1980

Cruz Azul (Mexico)	1–3	(Mexico) UNAM

UNAM won 4–1 on aggregate; advanced to the final round.

Central America Zone

Team 1	Agg.	Team 2	1st leg	2nd leg
UNAH (Honduras)	1–0	(Honduras) Marathón	1–0	0–0

=== Central America Zone ===
Torneo Centroamericano de Concacaf 1980

26 December 1980

UNAH (Honduras)	1–0	(Honduras) Marathón
Goal

Estadio Nacional Chelato Uclés, Tegucigalpa
29 December 1980

Marathón (Honduras)	0–0	(Honduras) UNAH

Estadio Francisco Morazán, San Pedro Sula

UNAH won 1–0 on aggregate.

Caribbean Zone

Team 1	Agg.	Team 2	1st leg	2nd leg
Robinhood (Suriname)	1–0	(Suriname) Transvaal	0–0	1–0

=== Caribbean Zone ===
14 December 1980

Robinhood (Suriname)	0–0	(Suriname) Transvaal

21 December 1980

Transvaal (Suriname)	0–1	(Suriname) Robinhood

Robinhood won 1–0 on aggregate.

== Final round ==
All matches were played in Tegucigalpa.

Pos	Team	Pld	W	D	L	GF	GA	GD	Pts	Final result
1	(Mexico) UNAM (C)	2	2	0	0	5	0	+5	4	Champions
2	(Honduras) UNAH	2	0	1	1	1	3	−2	1	
3	(Suriname) Robinhood	2	0	1	1	1	4	−3	1	

Source: CONCACAF
(C) Champions
8 February 1981

UNAM (Mexico)	3–0	(Suriname) Robinhood
Sánchez 38', 85'; Ferretti 69'

Estadio Nacional, Tegucigalpa

10 February 1981

UNAH (Honduras)	1–1	(Suriname) Robinhood
Murillo 35'		George 90'

Estadio Nacional, Tegucigalpa

12 February 1981

UNAH (Honduras)	0–2	(Mexico) UNAM
		Ferretti 43'; Sánchez 60' (pen.)

Estadio Nacional, Tegucigalpa
