= Harold Cooper (baseball) =

American politician and baseball executive

Harold McKinley Cooper (February 14, 1923 – October 4, 2010) was an American politician and Minor League Baseball executive who served as president of the International League from 1978 to 1990. He is recognized as the father of modern baseball in Columbus, Ohio, for twice helping return the game to the park that would subsequently be named Cooper Stadium in his honor.

== Early life and the Red Birds ==
Cooper grew up in the Columbus neighborhood of Franklinton, just a few blocks from the site where the St. Louis Cardinals built a home for their American Association franchise in 1932. He visited Red Bird Stadium while it was still under construction, bringing lunch to grandfather who was serving as a foreman. Later, he would sneak into games frequently, occasionally getting caught. After one such apprehension, Red Birds president George Trautman gave him an unpaid job cleaning mold off hot dogs. In 1935, he was promoted to the paid job of clubhouse boy, cleaning uniforms, shining shoes and running errands for the players.

== Military service and return to baseball ==
Cooper graduated from Central High School in 1940 and attended Ohio State University in 1941. He then served in the United States Coast Guard from 1942 to 1946. After the war, he took a position in Columbus with the National Association of Professional Baseball Leagues (later known as Minor League Baseball) before heading to Hutchinson, Kansas, where he would be named The Sporting News Minor League Executive of the Year in 1950 while running the Western Association affiliate of the Pittsburgh Pirates.

== Columbus Jets ==
Following the 1954 season, the Cardinals pulled out of Columbus, promoting their Omaha affiliate to replace the Red Birds in the American Association. Cooper led a group that purchased the struggling Ottawa Athletics and Red Bird Stadium. From 1955 to 1968, he would serve as GM of the rechristened Columbus Jets, once again earning Minor League Executive of the Year honors in 1965. Cooper stepped down in 1968 to begin a 17-year run as a Commissioner of Franklin County. Two years later, the Jets were relocated to Charleston when Columbus refused to allocate funds to refurbish the then 39-year-old Jets Stadium.

== Columbus Clippers ==
In 1977, Cooper persuaded his fellow commissioners to purchase and renovate the stadium, which was renamed Franklin County Stadium. The renamed Columbus Clippers returned from Charleston, with the county taking the unique step of buying the affiliate itself from the Pittsburgh Pirates for $25,000. The gamble paid off; as of 2016, Forbes valued the team at $41 million, and the team made a profit for the county of $1.33 million in 2015.

While still serving as a County Commissioner, Cooper became president of the International League in 1978, a post he held for 12 years. From 1988 to 1989, he served as commissioner of the Triple-A Alliance, an interleague partnership between the International League and American Association. In 1984, the old ballpark he watched being built as a child was renamed Cooper Stadium in recognition of his contributions to baseball in Columbus. When the Clippers outgrew Cooper Stadium in 2009, they erected a statue of Cooper, entitled The Father of Columbus Baseball, at the main entrance of their new home, Huntington Park.
