= Bill Williams (footballer, born 1942) =

English footballer and manager (born 1942)

Personal information
- Full name: William Thomas Williams
- Date of birth: 23 August 1942 (age 84)
- Place of birth: Esher, Surrey, England
- Position: Centre half

Team information
- Current team: Maidstone United (Chief Executive & Director of Football)

Youth career
- Portsmouth

Senior career*
Years	Team	Apps	(Gls)
1960–1961	Portsmouth	3	(0)
1961–1963	Queens Park Rangers	45	(0)
1964–1965	West Bromwich Albion	1	(0)
1965–1967	Mansfield Town	49	(0)
1967–1972	Gillingham	171	(8)
1972–?	Maidstone United	?	(?)
1973–?	Durban City	?	(0)

International career
	England Youth	8	(?)

Managerial career
- 1973–?: Durban City
- 1979–1980: Sacramento Gold
- 1980–1981: Atlanta Chiefs
- 1981–1984: Maidstone United
- 1984–?: Durban United
- 1986–1987: Maidstone United
- 1991–1992: Maidstone United
- 1997–2001: Dover Athletic
- 2001: Kingstonian
- * Club domestic league appearances and goals as of 19:18, 25 April 2011 (UTC)

William Thomas Williams (born 23 August 1942) is an English former professional football player and football manager.

== Career ==
Williams played for Portsmouth, Queens Park Rangers, West Bromwich Albion, Mansfield Town and Gillingham, making over 250 Football League appearances in total. He also had a spell playing for Maidstone United before becoming player-manager of South African outfit Durban City.

After spending around five years at Durban City, Williams went to manage in America spending a year each at Sacramento Gold and the Atlanta Chiefs. After returning to England in 1981 Williams took over at the original Maidstone United, spending three years at the club before agreeing to move back to South Africa to manage Durban United. In 1986 Williams again took over the reins at Maidstone before becoming general manager of the club from 1987 to 1991. After the sacking of Graham Carr in 1991, Williams became Maidstone first team manager for the third time but lasted only a matter of months before being replaced by Clive Walker. In 1997 Williams took the manager's job at Dover Athletic and led the club to their highest ever league finish when the club came 6th in the Football Conference in the 1999–2000 season. After leaving Dover in 2001 Williams spent a short time managing Kingstonian.

Williams has since returned to the re-formed Maidstone United and has been a key member of the club for a number of years. He is currently Chief Executive and Director of Football and played a major role in moving the club to the Gallagher Stadium after 24 years of homelessness.

== Honours ==
Maidstone United

- Alliance Premier League 1983–84

Sacramento Gold

- American Soccer League: 1979
