= Bobby Arber =

English footballer (born 1951)

Personal information
- Full name: Robert Leonard Arber
- Date of birth: 13 January 1951 (age 75)
- Place of birth: Poplar, London, England
- Position: Left back

Youth career
- 1968–1969: Arsenal

Senior career*
Years	Team	Apps	(Gls)
1969–1970	Arsenal	0	(0)
1970–1973	Leyton Orient	31	(0)
1973–1974	Southend United	0	(0)
1974–1977	Rangers	?	(?)
1977	Tooting & Mitcham United	7	(0)
1978–1979	Barking	?	(?)
1979–1980	Sacramento Gold	?	(?)
1980–1981	Atlanta Chiefs (indoor)	18	(0)
1980–1981	Atlanta Chiefs	15	(0)

Managerial career
- 1985–1986: Barking
- * Club domestic league appearances and goals

Robert Leonard Arber (born 13 January 1951) is an English former professional footballer who played in the Football League as a defender.

Arber was born on 13 January 1951 in Poplar, London. He started his footballing career as a youth player with Arsenal before joining Leyton Orient in March 1968. He made 28 league appearances for Orient in the 1972-73 season but could not tie down a place in the first team and went to Southend United on loan, and then to play in South Africa.

After retiring from playing, he worked as a coach at Barking and Woodford Town, and managed Barking between January 1985 and December 1986. He later worked as a youth coach at Tottenham Hotspur and a full-time scout at Arsenal.

== Personal life ==
Arber is the father of former footballer Mark Arber.
