= Joey Fink =

American soccer player

Personal information
- Full name: Joseph Fink
- Date of birth: July 31, 1951 (age 75)
- Place of birth: New York, New York, U.S.
- Height: 5 ft 11 in (1.80 m)
- Position: Forward

College career
Years	Team	Apps	(Gls)
- NYU Violets

Senior career*
Years	Team	Apps	(Gls)
1973–1975	New York Cosmos	42	(20)
1976–1978	Tampa Bay Rowdies	30	(5)
1978–1981	Philadelphia Fever (indoor)	93	(111)
1979	California Sunshine	23	(15)
1980	New York United	14	(9)
1980	Cleveland Cobras	22	(12)
1981	Carolina Lightnin'	14	(6)
1981–1985	Baltimore Blast (indoor)	177	(122)
Total		415	(300)

International career
1973–1975	United States	6	(0)
- * Club domestic league appearances and goals

Joey Fink (born July 31, 1951) is an American retired soccer forward who spent six seasons in the North American Soccer League, two in the American Soccer League and seven in Major Indoor Soccer League. He also earned six caps with the U.S. national team between 1973 and 1975.

== Youth and college ==
Fink played youth soccer with Blau-Weiss Gottschee. He went to college at New York University where he was a 1971 honorable mention (third team) All-American soccer player. That season he scored a school record eighteen goals. He was inducted into the Athletic Hall of Fame on May 10, 2008.

== Professional ==
In 1973, the New York Cosmos of the North American Soccer League (NASL) drafted Fink in the first round of the NASL College Draft. That year he began the first four games on the bench. In the fifth game of the season, Fink came off the bench and scored three goals. He ended the season with eleven goals in twelve starts and three late game appearances.

This led to Fink's selection as a second team 1973 All Star. Despite his productivity, the Cosmos coach, Gordon Bradley, acquired Harold Jarman to replace Fink for the 1974 season. When Jarman failed to produce (scoring only four goals in eighteen games), Bradley gradually began to go with Fink who finished the 1974 season with three goals in eight starts and four late-game appearances. In 1975, Fink scored six goals in sixteen games and was traded to the Tampa Bay Rowdies at the end of the season.

Fink spent the next three seasons with the Rowdies before leaving the NASL at the end of the 1978 season. In 1979, Fink joined the California Sunshine of the American Soccer League (ASL). He tied with teammate Poli Garcia for the league lead in goal scoring with fifteen. In 1980, he was with the New York United and Cleveland Cobras.

By that time Fink was a successful indoor soccer player and he dedicated himself to the indoor game. In 1978, Fink signed with the Philadelphia Fever of the newly established Major Indoor Soccer League (MISL). Fink scored thirty goals in twenty-two games as the Fever went to the MISL championship series before falling to the New York Arrows. In the 1980–1981 season, Fink scored fifty-one goals in thirty-nine games.

On July 1, 1981, the Baltimore Blast acquired Fink from Fever. He went on to play at four seasons with the Blast. In 1984, he became the first American player to score 200 goals in MISL. He followed that achievement up by scoring five goals in the final game of the 1983-1984 championship series to give the Blast the title over the St. Louis Steamers. He was inducted into the Baltimore Blast Hall of Fame in 2006.

== National team ==
Fink earned his first cap with the U.S. national team in a 1–0 win over Bermuda on September 9, 1973. He went on to play a total of six games with the national team, his last coming in a 2–0 loss to Mexico on August 24, 1975.
