= Poli Garcia =

American soccer player

Personal information
- Full name: Jose Garcia
- Date of birth: January 8, 1958 (age 68)
- Place of birth: San Diego, California, United States
- Positions: Midfielder; forward

Senior career*
Years	Team	Apps	(Gls)
1977–1979	California Sunshine	56	(50)
1979–1980	Cleveland Force (indoor)	38	(24)
1980–1981	Los Angeles Aztecs	48	(10)
1980–1981	Los Angeles Aztecs (indoor)	18	(22)
1981–1982	Jacksonville Tea Men (indoor)	13	(3)
1982–1983	Jacksonville Tea Men	39	(11)
1982–1987	Los Angeles Lazers (indoor)	211	(135)
1987–1988	St. Louis Steamers (indoor)	78	(69)
1988–1989	San Diego Sockers (indoor)	21	(1)
1989	Los Angeles Lazers (indoor)	17	(1)
Total		539	(326)

International career
1975	United States	2	(0)
- * Club domestic league appearances and goals

Jose “Poli” Garcia (born in San Diego, California) is an American former soccer player. He spent at least four seasons in the American Soccer League, three in the North American Soccer League and four in the Major Indoor Soccer League. He was the 1979 American Soccer League MVP and earned two caps with the United States in 1975.

== Professional ==
Born in San Diego, Garcia spent most of his youth in Mexico City, Mexico. His family returned to California when he was fifteen. Garcia signed with the expansion California Sunshine of the American Soccer League in 1977. In 1979, he and teammate Joey Fink tied for the league lead in goal scoring with fifteen apiece. Garcia also garnered league MVP and first team All Star recognition. In 1980, he moved from the Sunshine to the Los Angeles Aztecs of the North American Soccer League (NASL). After the Aztecs folded following the 1981 season, and Garcia moved to the Jacksonville Tea Men for the 1982 season. The Tea Men left the NASL and joined the ASL following and Garcia remained with the team through at least the 1983 ASL season.

=== Indoor years ===
Garcia began his indoor career with the Cleveland Force of Major Indoor Soccer League in 1979–80. After one season in MISL, he played NASL indoor with the Aztecs in 1980–81 and the Tea Men for 1981–82. He then moved back to the MISL with the Los Angeles Lazers for the 1982–83 season. On February 27, 1987, the Lazers traded Garcia and Jim Kavanaugh to the St. Louis Steamers for Don Ebert and Steve Pecher. The following year, his only full season with the Steamers, he led the team in scoring with 50 goals. When the Steamers folded, Garcia became a free agent and signed with the San Diego Sockers on September 14, 1988. He began the season with the Sockers, but was traded to the Lazers in exchange for Waad Hirmez on February 3, 1989. When the Lazers folded at the end of the season, the St. Louis Storm selected Garcia in the MISL dispersal draft, but did not sign him.

== National team ==
Garcia earned two caps with the United States in August 1975 at the Mexico City Cup. His first game was a 6–0 loss to Argentina on August 21. His second was a 2–0 loss to Mexico on August 24, 1975. In the second game, he replaced Hank Liotart in the 71st minute.
