= Daniel Mammana =

Argentine footballer

Personal information
- Full name: Daniel Eduardo Mammana
- Place of birth: Argentina
- Height: 6 ft 5 in (1.96 m)
- Position: Defender

Senior career*
Years	Team	Apps	(Gls)
1972	River Plate	2	(0)
1976	San Antonio Thunder	0	(0)
1976	Utah Golden Spikers	15	(4)
1977–1978	Sacramento Spirits		
1979–1980	Columbus Magic		
1980	Cleveland Cobras		
1981	Detroit Express		
- * Club domestic league appearances and goals

Daniel Eduardo Mammana is a retired Argentinian football (soccer) defender who played professionally in Argentina and the United States.

In 1972, Mammana played for River Plate. In 1976, he signed with the San Antonio Thunder of the North American Soccer League. However, he saw no games with the first team. In 1977, he was a first team All Star with the Sacramento Spirits. That year the Spirits went to the championship game where they fell to the New Jersey Americans. In 1979, he played for the Columbus Magic. He was again a first team All Star. In 1980, he played for the Cleveland Cobras.

== Yearly Awards ==
- All-Star Team - 1977, 1979
