= Joe Mammana =

Italian American philanthropist

Joe Mammana is an Italian American philanthropist who has offered more than $1 million in reward money for leads to criminals primarily in Pennsylvania and Ohio high-profile murders and kidnappings. He is a redeemed ex-convict and millionaire head of Yardley Farms, an egg-processing plant in North Philadelphia. He has been described as a hard-boiled Sicilian businessman.

Mammana told The Columbus Dispatch that his own criminal past — convictions including aggravated assault, identity fraud, possession of illegal steroids and auto theft — inspired him to fight crime with the wealth he has gained through his businesses. Mammana's harsh talk about criminals and the vast amount of bounty money he has offered across the country have attracted national attention. Mammana would not disclose where he lives, discuss his business ventures, or be interviewed at length in April 2004 by request of The Philadelphia Inquirer. He has since appeared to be somewhat more open with The Columbus Dispatch.

In 2007, Mammana pled guilty to a firearms charge and agreed to plead guilty to failing to pay taxes on roughly $400,000 in 2005 income and underreported income from 2000 to 2004.
