= California Sunshine =

American soccer club

The California Sunshine was an American soccer club based in Fountain Valley, California that was a member of the American Soccer League. The team was owned by Dr. Robert Everakes and his wife Alexandra, who was the general manager. Their home games were held at Orange Coast College and at El Camino College but had exhibition games at the University of California, Riverside and Palm Springs Stadium. Their first season was 1977, but the team folded in 1981 after four seasons. The head coach was Derek Lawther.

The California Sunshine Soccer Team was founded in 1977 by Warren Hoffnung (a nuclear physicist, aerospace executive and entrepreneur – currently CEO of MyWrapper, a software company that sells software for creating personalized candy wrappers) and Lee Andrews (a financial advisor). They acquired the Orange County, California territorial rights in the American Soccer League, the oldest U.S. professional soccer league. The commissioner of the ASL at the time was basketball great Bob Cousy and there were teams spread across the U.S. A little known fact is that the California Sunshine approved the move of the NASL's St. Louis Stars to Anaheim Stadium where it was renamed the California Surf. The California Sunshine was founded with two major philosophies: To field as many American players as possible and to keep profanity off the playing field. The goal was to encourage American youth to be able to attend the matches and see how soccer could be an important part of their sports participation. In fact, all but one of the players were American.

== Year-by-year ==
Year	Division	League	Reg. season	Playoffs	National Cup
1977	2	ASL	3rd, West	1st Round	Did not enter
1978	2	ASL	2nd, Western	Semifinals	Did not enter
1979	2	ASL	1st, Western	Semifinals	Did not enter
1980	2	ASL	2nd, American	Playoffs	Did not enter

== Honors ==
MVP

- 1979 Poli Garcia

Coach of the Year

- 1978 Derek Lawther

First Team All Star

- 1977 Tony Douglas
- 1979 Tom Reynolds, Ramon Moraldo, Don Tobin, Poli Garcia
