= Cooper Stadium =

Baseball stadium in Columbus, Ohio, US

Coordinates: 39°56′47.06″N 83°1′41.58″W

- "The Coop", "County Stadium"
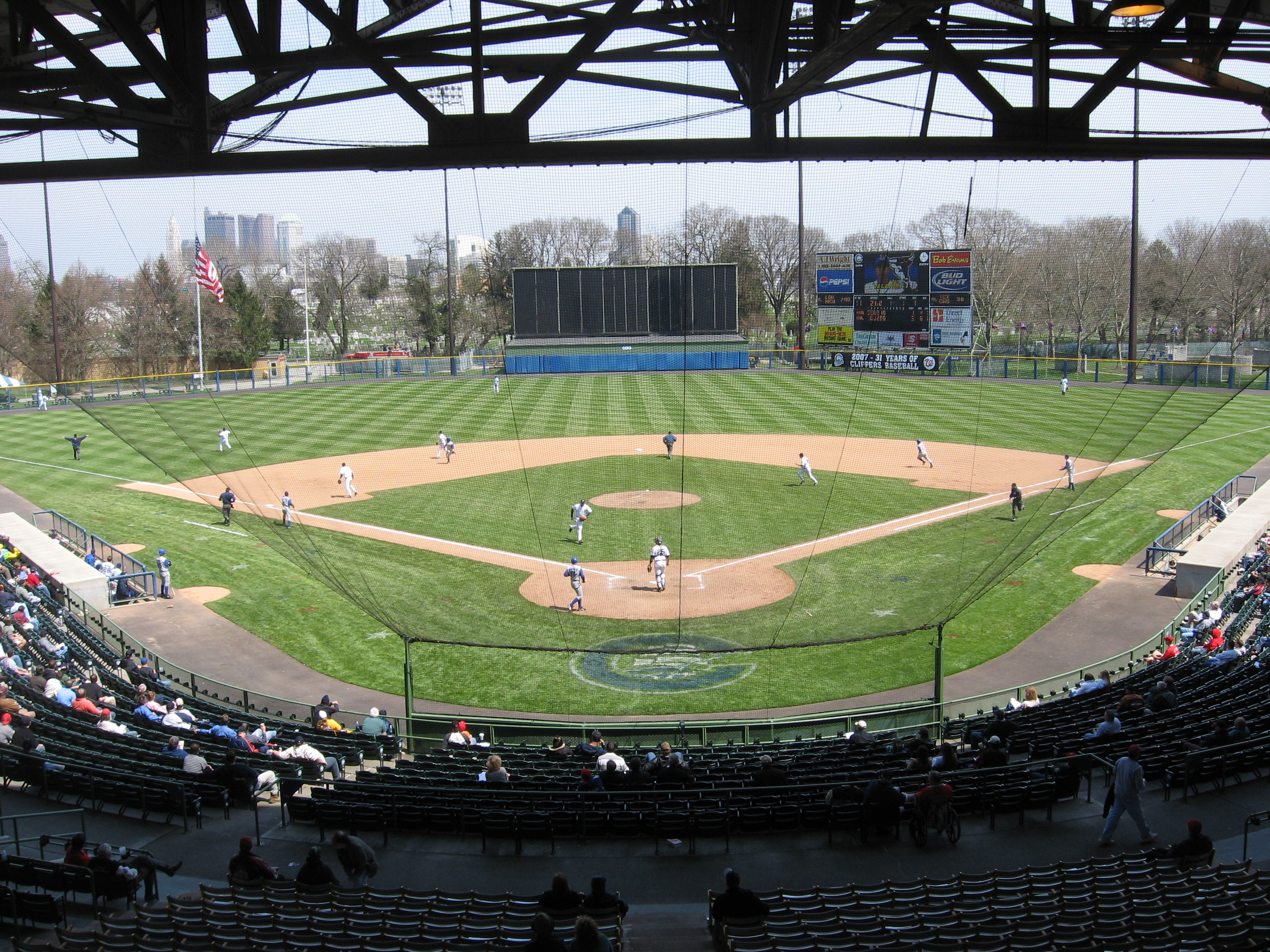
- The stadium in 2007
- Interactive map of Cooper Stadium
- Former names: Red Bird Stadium (1932–1954); Jets Stadium (1955–1970); Franklin County Stadium (1977–1984)
- Location: 1155 West Mound Street; Columbus, OH 43223
- Owner: Franklin County
- Operator: Franklin County
- Capacity: 17,500 (1932–1959); 12,000 (1960–1976); 15,000 (1977–2008)
- Surface: Natural Grass (1931–1983, 1998–2008); AstroTurf (1984–1997)
- Field size: Left Field – 355 ft Center Field – 400 ft Right Field – 330 ft

Construction
- Groundbreaking: 1931
- Opened: June 3, 1932
- Renovated: 1977
- Closed: September 1, 2008
- Cost: $450,000 ($10.6 million in 2025 dollars)
- Architect: Howard Dwight Smith

Tenants
- Columbus Red Birds (AA) (1931–1954); Columbus Blue Birds (NNL2) (1933); Columbus Elite Giants (NNL2) (1935); Columbus Bullies (APFA/AFL) (1938–1941); Columbus Jets (IL) (1955–1970); Columbus Metros (MWFL) (1978); Columbus Magic (ASL) (1979–1980); Columbus Clippers (IL) (1977–2008)

Cooper Stadium was a baseball stadium in Columbus, Ohio, that was built in 1931 and closed in 2008. It was the home of several minor league teams, including the Columbus Clippers from 1977 to 2008.

== History ==
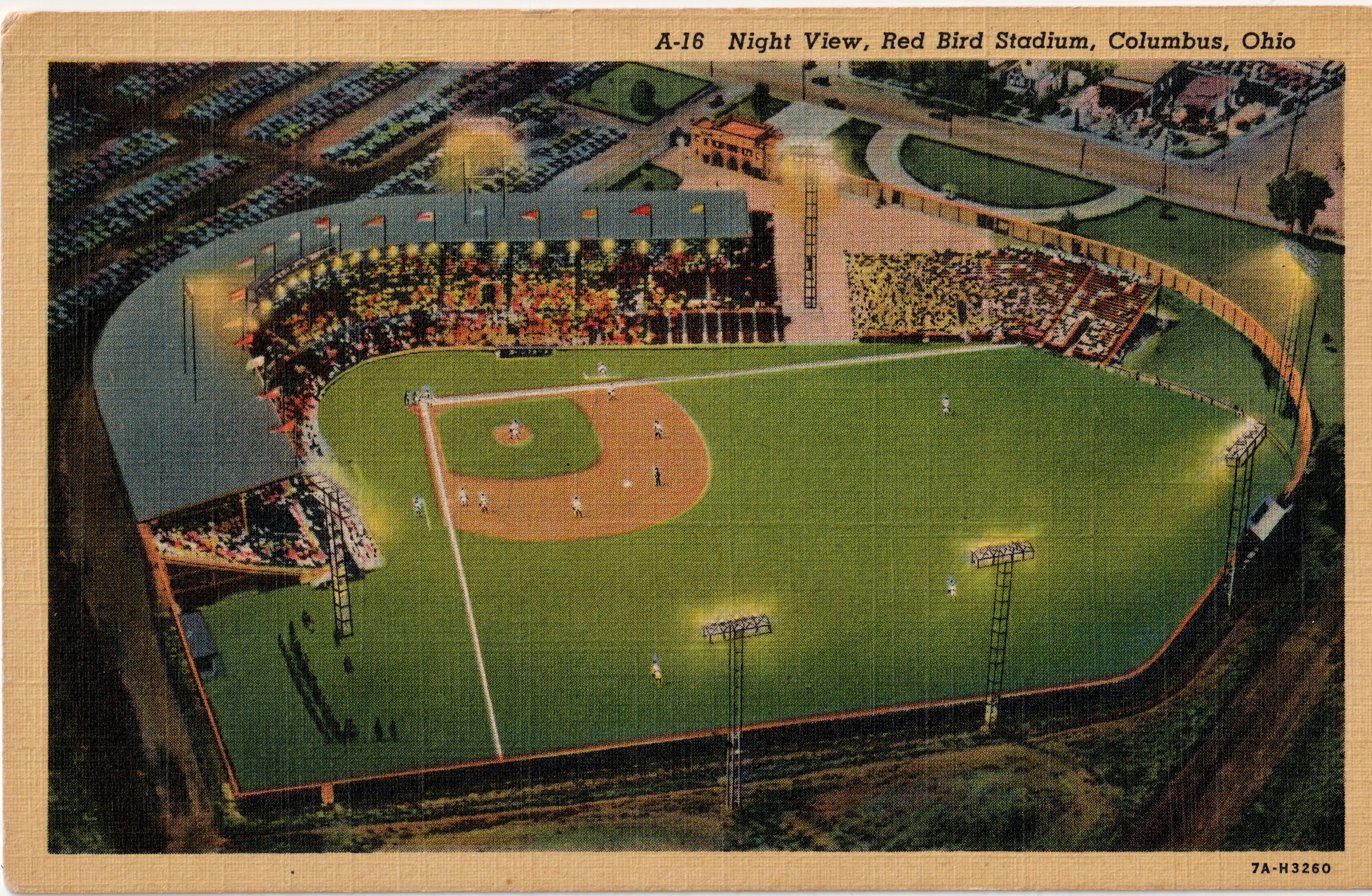
Night View, Red Bird Stadium, Columbus, Ohio in the 1940s

Cooper Stadium was built in 1931 as Red Bird Stadium as the home for the then-Columbus Red Birds of the American Association, one of the minor league teams of the St. Louis Cardinals. It was constructed using the same blueprints which were used for building Red Wing Stadium in Rochester, New York in 1929. The Cardinals owned both teams when the respective stadiums were built.

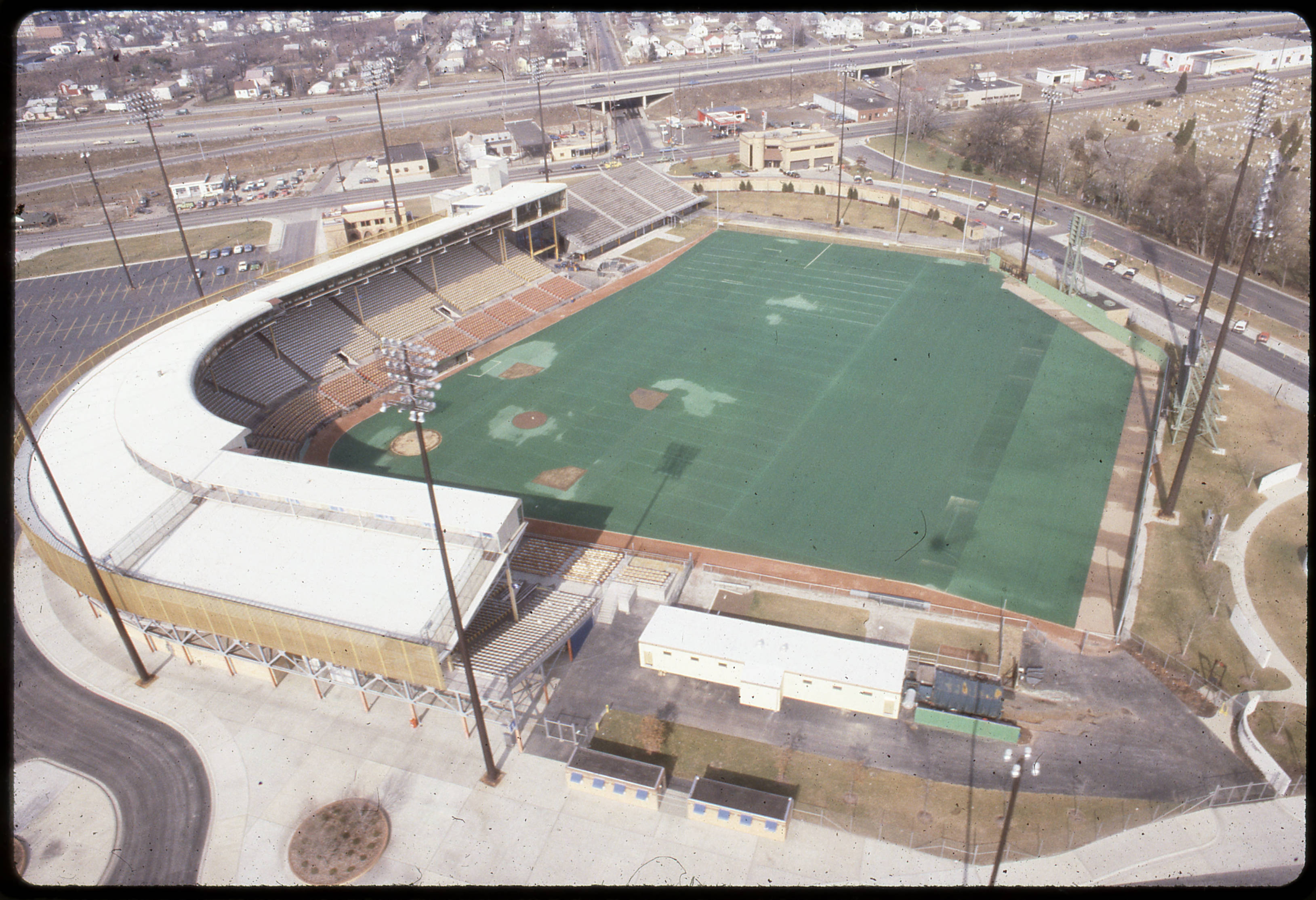
Cooper Stadium in 1983

When the Red Birds moved to Omaha after the 1954 season, the International League's Ottawa Athletics moved to Columbus as the Jets and took up residence at the stadium. Accordingly, it was renamed Jets Stadium. The Jets moved out in 1970, and the stadium sat dormant for six years.

When the International League granted a new franchise to Columbus, the county government bought and renovated Jet Stadium, which was renamed Franklin County Stadium, for the newly minted Clippers. In 1984 the stadium was renamed in honor of Harold Cooper, who was responsible for bringing the Jets to Columbus in the 1950s, and had AstroTurf installed, which was removed by 1997. The stadium was owned and operated by the Franklin County government, located in the section of the city known as Franklinton.

== Tenants and events ==
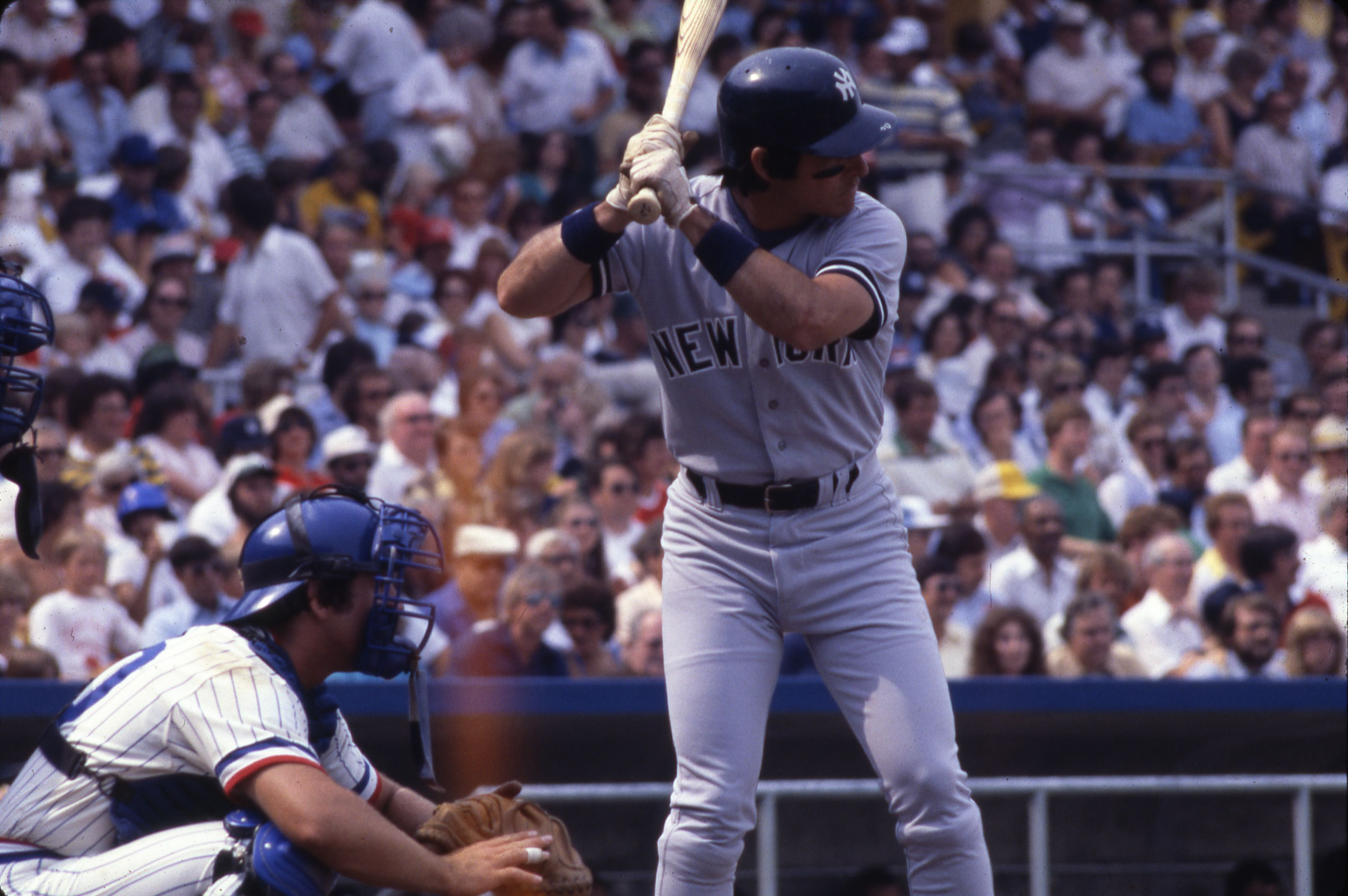
Bucky Dent at bat at Cooper Stadium

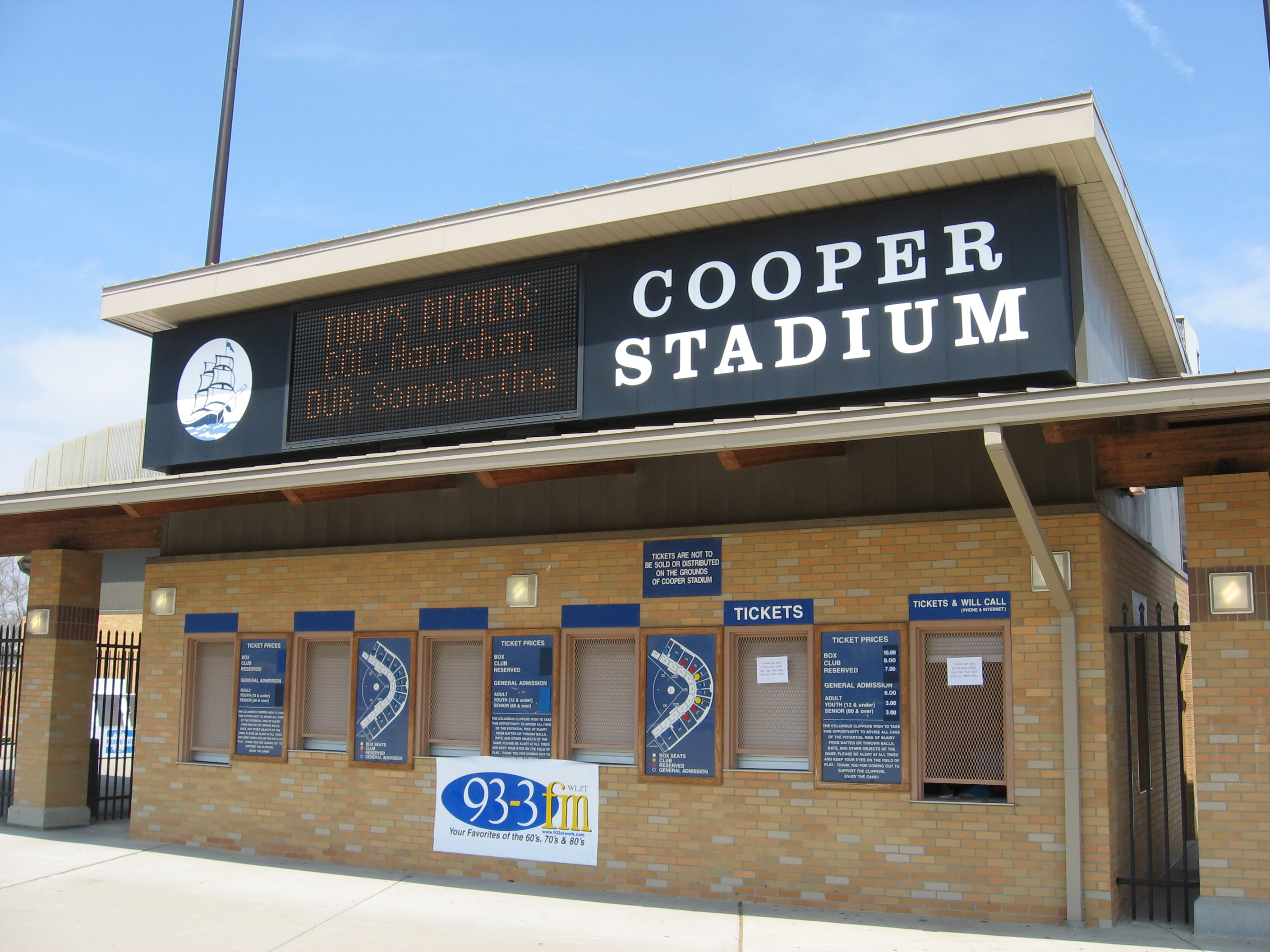
Box office, 2007

Over the years, Cooper Stadium was home to the Columbus Red Birds, a farm team for the St. Louis Cardinals; the Negro league Columbus Blue Birds; the Columbus Jets; and, after the renovation was completed, the Columbus Clippers. From 1939 through 1941, Cooper Stadium (then named Red Bird Stadium) was also home to the Columbus Bullies, two-time champions of the third American Football League.

Cooper Stadium hosted the 1989 Triple-A All-Star Game. The team of National League-affiliated All-Stars defeated the team of American League-affiliated All-Stars, 8–3.

The stadium has also hosted a number of other events, such as roller derbies, music concerts (including Aerosmith, Rush, Bob Dylan & Garth Brooks), professional wrestling (including Bobo Brazil, the Sheik, & Ali Baba) and hosted evangelist Billy Graham.

Cooper Stadium also hosted the OHSAA Ohio high-school boys baseball State Tournament.

=== Final baseball game ===
The Clippers moved from Cooper Stadium after the 2008 season to a new ballpark, Huntington Park, which is located in the Arena District in downtown Columbus. On September 1, 2008, the final game was played as the Toledo Mud Hens defeated the Columbus Clippers in front of 16,770 fans, the third largest crowd in stadium history.

== Racetrack conversion ==
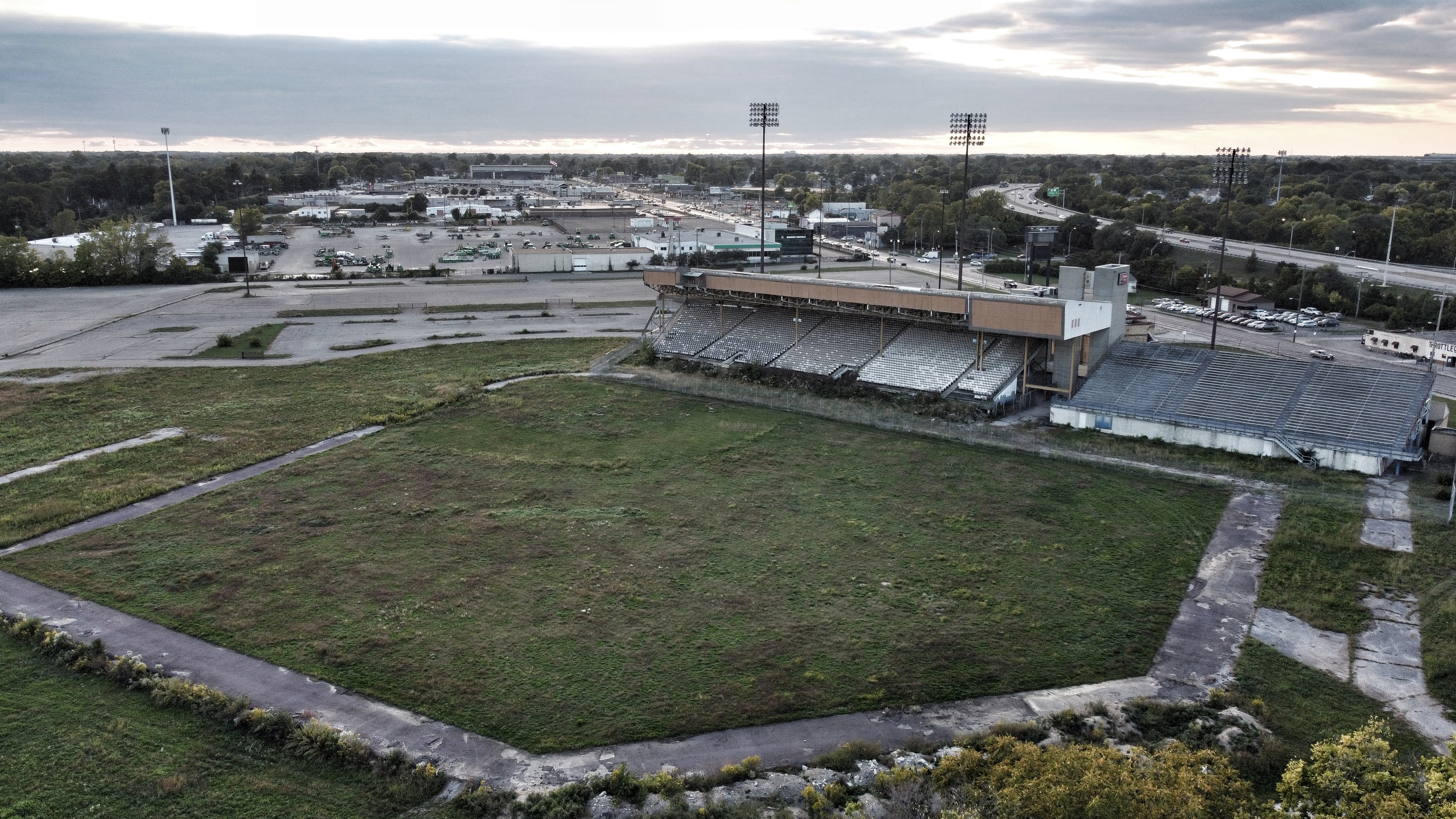
Remnants of the stadium in 2020

As of May 1, 2008, a proposal to turn the site of Cooper Stadium into an auto racing facility was being considered. This is not a completely new use for the facility, as the parking lot south of the stadium has been used for Sports Car Club of America and autocross racing as well as motorcycle training. On June 27, 2011, the Columbus City Council voted to rezone the site to allow for a racetrack to be built.

On December 20, 2011, the Columbus Board of Zoning Adjustment approved a special permit by a vote of 4-0 that would clear the way for developer Arshot Investment to build a half-mile racetrack, automotive research and technology center. Arshot planned to spend up to $40 million to develop the 47-acre site.

Rumored plans also included a $22 million overhaul to eventually become the OHSAA stadium for most outdoor events (baseball, football, soccer, lacrosse, etc.). This would then make Cooper Stadium a multi-purpose stadium.

By April 2017 the first base side of the stadium had been demolished, leaving the third base side and bleachers still standing as what was to become the straightaway grandstands of the proposed race track. No other construction had been completed and according to an article appearing in The Columbus Dispatch, the project appeared to be dead.

As of September 2021, the former stadium site sits half demolished and abandoned.
