= Sacramento Gold (1976–1980) =

American Soccer Club Sacramento, California

The Sacramento Gold was an American soccer club based in Sacramento, California that was a member of the American Soccer League. They were original called the Sacramento Spirits when founded in 1976. During their final months of existence in the 1980 season they were known as the Sacramento Spirit.

== History ==
In the team's inaugural season they failed to qualify for the ASL playoffs. In the 1977 season the Spirits won the West Division and made it to the ASL championship game. During the 1978 season the Spirits' ASL membership was canceled for failing to fulfill the obligations of the ASL constitution. They were replaced by a new team owned by local cabinet manufacturer, John Andreotti. Less than two weeks later the "new" franchise was named the Sacramento Gold and inherited the Spirits' 2–4–0 record, players, and remaining schedule. In 1979 Sacramento won the ASL title. For their part, the Gold ceased operations on July 16, 1980. In a situation similar to 1978, the Gold was replaced by the Spirit, however this time it was the club's boosters that assumed the responsibility of running the club. In the 1980 season the Sacramento club won the American Conference and reached the ASL title game for the third time in four years.

== Coaches ==
- (United States) Dick Ott (1976)
- (South Africa) Bernard Hartze (1976)
- (England) Bob Ridley (1976–77)
- (England) Bill Williams (1979–80)

== Yearly Awards ==
ASL Coach of the Year

- 1977 - Bob Ridley

ASL Rookie of the Year

- 1977 - Mal Roche
- 1978 - Emilio John

ASL All-Star Team

- 1977 - Daniel Mammana
- 1979 - Mickey Brown, Ian Filby
- 1980 - Raul Carrizo

ASL Leading Points Scorer

- 1979 - Ian Filby (45 Points)

== Year-by-year ==
Year	Division	League	Reg. season	Playoffs	U.S. Open Cup
1976	2	ASL	5th, West	Did not qualify	Did not enter
1977	2	ASL	1st, West	Final	Did not enter
1978	2	ASL	4th, Western	Did not qualify	Did not enter
1979	2	ASL	2nd, Western	Champion	Did not enter
1980	2	ASL	1st, American	Final	Did not enter

== Honors ==
- American Soccer League Champions (1): 1979
- Runners-up (2): 1977, 1980
- Participations in CONCACAF Champions' Cup: 1980
