= Columbus Magic =

American soccer club

- Nickname: Magic
- Founded: 1979
- Dissolved: 1980
- Ground: Franklin County Stadium
- League: American Soccer League

The Columbus Magic was an American soccer club based in Columbus, Ohio, that was a member of the American Soccer League. They played their home games in Franklin County Stadium that they shared with Minor League Baseball's Columbus Clippers. The Magic held soccer camps located at Fancyburg Park in Upper Arlington, Ohio.

In August 1980, the team played against the New York United in Shea Stadium without its forward, Bob Rohrbach, who had sustained a serious head injury in a match against the Cleveland Cobras and was in a coma for four days. Other notable players included British expat Neil Hague.

== Year-by-year ==
Year	Division	League	Reg. season	Playoffs	U.S. Open Cup
1979	2	ASL	1st, Eastern	Final	Did not enter
1980	2	ASL	4th, National	Did not qualify	Did not enter
