= 1991 North American Nations Cup squads =

These are the squads for the countries that played in the 1991 North American Nations Cup.

The age listed for each player is on 12 March 1990, the first day of the tournament. The numbers of caps and goals listed for each player do not include any matches played after the start of the tournament. The club listed is the club for which the player last played a competitive match before the tournament. The nationality for each club reflects the national association (not the league) to which the club is affiliated. A flag is included for coaches who are of a different nationality than their own national team.

== Canada ==
Head coach: (England) Tony Waiters

No.	Pos.	Player	Date of birth (age)	Caps	Club
1	GK	Paul Dolan	16 April 1966 (aged 24)		(Canada) Vancouver 86ers
4	MF	Lyndon Hooper	30 May 1966 (aged 24)		(Canada) Toronto Blizzard
5	DF	Ian Bridge	18 September 1959 (aged 31)		(Canada) Victoria Vistas
6	MF	Drew Ferguson	9 November 1957 (aged 33)		(Canada) Kitchener Spirit
7	MF	Norm Odinga	11 February 1963 (aged 28)		(Canada) Vancouver 86ers
8	MF	Gerry Gray	20 January 1961 (aged 30)		(Canada) Toronto Blizzard
9	FW	John Catliff	8 January 1965 (aged 26)		(Canada) Vancouver 86ers
10	FW	Nick Gilbert	20 July 1965 (aged 25)		(Canada) Hamilton Steelers
11	FW	Doug Muirhead	20 March 1962 (aged 28)		(Canada) Vancouver 86ers
12	MF	Jamie Lowery	15 January 1961 (aged 30)		(Canada) Vancouver 86ers
13	GK	Pat Onstad	13 January 1968 (aged 23)		(Canada) Toronto Blizzard
14	MF	Geoff Aunger	4 February 1968 (aged 23)		(Canada) Vancouver 86ers
15	DF	Mark Watson	8 September 1970 (aged 20)		(Canada) Vancouver 86ers
16	FW	Grant Needham	14 July 1970 (aged 20)		(Canada) Montreal Supra
	DF	Peter Sarantopoulos	2 May 1968 (aged 22)		(Canada) North York Rockets
	DF	Peter Gilfillan	29 December 1965 (aged 25)		(Canada) Kitchener Spirit
	MF	Rick Celebrini	16 October 1967 (aged 23)		(Canada) Kitchener Spirit
	MF	Sammy Saundh	5 May 1959 (aged 31)		(Canada) Vancouver 86ers

== Mexico ==
Head coach: Ignacio Trelles

No.	Pos.	Player	Date of birth (age)	Caps	Club
1	GK	Hugo Pineda	10 May 1962 (aged 28)		(Mexico) Leones Negros UdeG
2	DF	Antonio González Hernández	17 January 1966 (aged 25)		(Mexico) Monterrey
3	DF	Abraham Nava	23 January 1964 (aged 27)		(Mexico) UNAM Pumas
4	DF	Pedro Pablo Osorio	29 December 1965 (aged 25)		(Mexico) Veracruz
5	DF	Rafael Gutiérrez Aldaco	8 May 1967 (aged 23)		(Mexico) Guadalajara
6	MF	Guillermo Vázquez	25 May 1967 (aged 23)		(Mexico) Tecos
7	DF	Juan Hernández	8 March 1965 (aged 26)		(Mexico) América
8	FW	Luis Antonio Valdéz	July 1, 1965 (aged 25)	11	(Mexico) Guadalajara
9	FW	Luis García Postigo	1 June 1969 (aged 21)		(Mexico) UNAM Pumas
10	MF	Alberto Garcia Aspe	11 May 1967 (aged 23)		(Mexico) UNAM Pumas
11	MF	Alfonso Sosa	5 October 1967 (aged 23)		(Mexico) Leones Negros UdeG
12	GK	Ricardo Martínez Quiroz	7 April 1966 (aged 24)		(Mexico) UAT
13	MF	José Luis González China	3 June 1966 (aged 24)		(Mexico) León
14	DF	Juan de Dios Ramírez Perales	8 March 1969 (aged 22)		(Mexico) UNAM Pumas
15	MF	Missael Espinoza	April 12, 1965 (aged 25)		(Mexico) Monterrey
17	FW	Luís Roberto Alves	23 May 1967 (aged 23)		(Mexico) América
22	GK	Carlos Barra	23 May 1967 (aged 23)		(Mexico) Veracruz
	DF	Guadalupe Castañeda	24 February 1965 (aged 26)		(Mexico) León
	DF	Sergio Almaguer	16 May 1969 (aged 21)		(Mexico) Querétaro
	MF	Pedro Duana	23 October 1966 (aged 24)		(Mexico) Cruz Azul
	MF	Alberto García Martínez	7 January 1965 (aged 26)		(Mexico) Monterrey
	MF	Gonzalo Farfán	25 February 1961 (aged 30)		(Mexico) América
	MF	Francisco Uribe	11 January 1966 (aged 25)		(Mexico) León

== United States ==
Head coach: John Kowalski

No.	Pos.	Player	Date of birth (age)	Caps	Club
1	GK	Tony Meola	21 February 1969 (aged 22)		(United States) Fort Lauderdale Strikers
2	DF	Steve Trittschuh	24 April 1965 (aged 25)		(Czechoslovakia) Sparta Prague
3	DF	Alexi Lalas	1 June 1970 (aged 20)		(United States) Rutgers Scarlet Knights
4	DF	Jimmy Banks	2 September 1964 (aged 26)		(United States) Milwaukee Wave
5	DF	Jeff Agoos	2 May 1968 (aged 22)		(United States) Free agent
7	MF	Mark Santel	5 July 1968 (aged 22)		(United States) Free agent
8	MF	Dominic Kinnear	26 July 1967 (aged 23)		(United States) San Francisco Bay Blackhawks
9	MF	Steve Rammel	20 April 1968 (aged 22)		(United States) Penn-Jersey Spirit
10	FW	Peter Vermes	21 November 1966 (aged 24)		(United States) Tampa Bay Rowdies
11	FW	Eric Wynalda	9 June 1969 (aged 21)		(United States) San Francisco Bay Blackhawks
12	DF	Paul Krumpe	4 March 1963 (aged 28)		(United States) Free agent
13	GK	Mark Dodd	14 September 1965 (aged 25)		(United States) Colorado Foxes
14	DF	Troy Dayak	29 January 1971 (aged 20)		(United States) San Francisco Bay Blackhawks
15	FW	Dante Washington	21 November 1970 (aged 20)		(United States) Radford Highlanders
16	FW	Bruce Murray	25 January 1966 (aged 25)		(United States) Maryland Bays
17	DF	Marcelo Balboa	8 August 1967 (aged 23)		(United States) San Francisco Bay Blackhawks
19	MF	Chris Henderson	11 December 1970 (aged 20)		(United States) UCLA Bruins
21	MF	Fernando Clavijo	23 January 1956 (aged 35)		(United States) St. Louis Storm
