= 1990 North American Nations Cup squads =

Football tournament squads

These are the squads for the countries that played in the 1990 North American Nations Cup.

The age listed for each player is on 6 May 1990, the first day of the tournament. The numbers of caps and goals listed for each player do not include any matches played after the start of the tournament. The club listed is the club for which the player last played a competitive match before the tournament. The nationality for each club reflects the national association (not the league) to which the club is affiliated. A flag is included for coaches who are of a different nationality than their own national team.

== Canada ==
Head coach: (England) Tony Waiters

No.	Pos.	Player	Date of birth (age)	Caps	Club
1	GK	Craig Forrest	3 September 1967 (aged 22)		(England) Ipswich Town
2	DF	Frank Yallop	4 April 1964 (aged 26)		(England) Ipswich Town
3	DF	Colin Miller	4 October 1964 (aged 25)		(Scotland) Hamilton Academical
4	DF	Peter Sarantopoulos	2 May 1968 (aged 22)		(Canada) North York Rockets
5	DF	Ian Bridge	18 September 1959 (aged 30)		(Switzerland) La Chaux-de-Fonds
6	MF	Jim Easton Jr.	3 June 1965 (aged 24)		(Canada) Vancouver 86ers
7	MF	John Limniatis	24 June 1967 (aged 22)		(Greece) Aris
8	FW	Nick Gilbert	20 July 1965 (aged 24)		(Canada) Edmonton Brick Men
9	FW	John Catliff	8 January 1965 (aged 25)		(Canada) Vancouver 86ers
10	MF	Mike Sweeney	25 December 1959 (aged 30)		(Canada) Toronto Blizzard
11	MF	Jamie Lowery	15 January 1961 (aged 29)		(Canada) Vancouver 86ers
12	MF	John Fitzgerald	4 December 1968 (aged 21)		(Canada) Toronto Blizzard
13	FW	Doug Muirhead	20 March 1962 (aged 28)		(Canada) Vancouver 86ers
14	GK	Paul Dolan	16 April 1966 (aged 24)		(Canada) Vancouver 86ers
15	GK	Sven Habermann	3 November 1961 (aged 28)		(Canada) Hamilton Steelers
16	DF	Randy Samuel	23 December 1963 (aged 26)		(Netherlands) Volendam
17	DF	Patrick Diotte	13 November 1967 (aged 22)		(Canada) Montreal Supra
18	MF	Peter Gilfillan	29 December 1965 (aged 24)		(Canada) Kitchener Spirit
19	MF	Gerry Gray	20 January 1961 (aged 29)		(Canada) Toronto Blizzard
20	MF	Lindsay Henderson			(Canada) Queens Park Vancouver
21	FW	Rob Baarts	19 February 1969 (aged 21)		(United States) Portland Pilots

== Mexico ==
Head coach: Ignacio Trelles

No.	Pos.	Player	Date of birth (age)	Caps	Club
1	GK	Hugo Pineda	10 May 1962 (aged 27)		(Mexico) América
2	DF	Rafael Gutiérrez Aldaco	8 May 1967 (aged 22)		(Mexico) Guadalajara
3	DF	Aurelio Rivera	25 October 1961 (aged 28)		(Mexico) Tampico Madero
4	MF	Eduardo Rergis	20 April 1958 (aged 32)		(Mexico) Veracruz
5	MF	Víctor Medina	9 October 1965 (aged 24)		(Mexico) Atlante
6	MF	Juan Morales	22 February 1964 (aged 26)		(Mexico) Irapuato
7	FW	Luis Flores	18 July 1961 (aged 28)		(Mexico) Cruz Azul
8	FW	Sergio Lira	24 August 1957 (aged 32)		(Mexico) Tampico Madero
9	GK	Javier Ledesma	19 September 1958 (aged 31)		(Mexico) Guadalajara
10	MF	Javier Aguirre	1 December 1958 (aged 31)		(Mexico) Guadalajara
11	MF	Missael Espinoza	12 April 1965 (aged 25)		(Mexico) Monterrey
12	DF	Raúl Servín	29 April 1963 (aged 27)		(Mexico) UNAM Pumas
13	MF	Porfirio Jiménez	15 September 1965 (aged 24)		(Mexico) Cruz Azul
14	MF	José Luis González China	3 June 1966 (aged 23)		(Mexico) Atlante
15	DF	Pedro Pablo Osorio	29 December 1965 (aged 24)		(Mexico) Atlético Morelia
16	FW	Fernando Sánchez Limón	11 October 1965 (aged 24)		(Mexico) Tecos
17	FW	Sergio Pacheco Sapién	30 July 1965 (aged 24)		(Mexico) Atlas

== United States ==
Head coach: John Kowalski

No.	Pos.	Player	Date of birth (age)	Caps	Club
1	GK	Tony Meola	21 February 1969 (aged 21)		(United States) Free agent
2	GK	Kasey Keller	29 November 1969 (aged 20)		(United States) Portland Pilots
3	DF	Billy Thompson	5 May 1968 (aged 22)		(United States) UCLA Bruins
4	MF	Robin Fraser	17 December 1966 (aged 23)		(United States) Colorado Foxes
5	DF	Troy Dayak	29 January 1971 (aged 19)		(United States) San Francisco Dons
6	DF	Kevin Grimes	9 October 1967 (aged 22)		(United States) Colorado Foxes
7	MF	Mark Santel	5 July 1968 (aged 21)		(United States) Saint Louis Billikens
8	FW	Jeff Betts	8 March 1970 (aged 20)		(United States) No Club
9	FW	Eric Eichmann	7 May 1965 (aged 25)		(United States) Fort Lauderdale Strikers
10	FW	John Garvey	26 March 1969 (aged 21)		(United States) Maryland Terrapins
11	DF	Paul Krumpe	4 March 1963 (aged 27)		(United States) Free agent
12	FW	Jeff Baicher	16 November 1968 (aged 21)		(United States) Santa Clara Broncos
13	MF	Michael DiNunzio	10 May 1966 (aged 23)		(United States) Canton Invaders
14	DF	Billy Crook	3 April 1964 (aged 26)		(United States) Tacoma Stars
15	GK	Juergen Sommer	27 February 1969 (aged 21)		(United States) Indiana Hoosiers
16	MF	Henry Gutierrez	28 August 1968 (aged 21)		(United States) NC State Wolfpack
17	DF	Alexi Lalas	1 June 1970 (aged 19)		(United States) Rutgers Scarlet Knights
18	DF	Cle Kooiman	3 July 1963 (aged 26)		(United States) Free agent
19	MF	Neil Covone	31 August 1969 (aged 20)		(United States) Wake Forest Demon Deacons
20	MF	Dave Kasper	13 August 1966 (aged 23)		(United States) Milwaukee Wave United
21	FW	Scott Benedetti	13 November 1966 (aged 23)		(United States) Seattle Storm
22	MF	Ted Eck	14 July 1966 (aged 23)		(Canada) Toronto Blizzard
