= 1989 Canadian Soccer League season =

Canadian Soccer League
- Season: 1989
- Champions: Vancouver 86ers
- Division Leaders: Toronto Blizzard (East); Vancouver 86ers (West)
- Matches: 130
- Goals: 418 (3.22 per match)
- Top goalscorer: (United States) Ted Eck (21)
- Best goalkeeper: (Canada) Paolo Ceccarelli (0.58 GAA)

The 1989 Canadian Soccer League season was the third season of play for the Canadian Soccer League, a Division 1 men's soccer league in the Canadian soccer pyramid.

== Format and changes from previous season ==
The Victoria Vistas joined the Canadian Soccer League as an expansion team for the 1990 season, joining the West Division. The divisions were now even with five teams each.

The Calgary Kickers folded following the 1988 season, but the club was replaced by a community-owned team called the Calgary Strikers.

Similar to the previous season, the teams played an unbalanced schedule with two-thirds of a team's matches coming against teams in their own division(4 matches each) and one-third against the opposite division (2 matches each) for a total of 26 matches. Following the season, the top three teams in each division would advance to the playoffs, with the division leaders earning a first round bye, to designate a national champion club. This season would see the first two rounds of the playoffs being played in two-legged times determined by aggregate score, while the final would remain a single match championship final.

== Summary ==
Vancouver repeated as West Division champions, while Toronto won their first East Division title. Hamilton reached the final despite for the third consecutive year, where they faced Vancouver for the second year in a row, with the 86ers repeating as champions.

Vancouver was dominant again, losing but two regular-season matches en route to a second straight victory over Hamilton in the championship game. The 86ers went 46 consecutive games from the previous season into this one without losing, which is a record for a professional sports team in Canada.

== Regular season ==
=== East Division ===
Pos	Team	Pld	W	D	L	GF	GA	GD	Pts	Qualification
1	Toronto Blizzard	26	16	6	4	48	27	+21	38	Playoff semifinals
2	Hamilton Steelers	26	15	7	4	56	28	+28	37	Playoff quarterfinals
3	North York Rockets	26	12	9	5	35	23	+12	33	Playoff quarterfinals
4	Ottawa Intrepid	26	7	8	11	41	46	−5	22	
5	Montreal Supra	26	3	9	14	26	46	−20	15	

Source: Canadian Soccer History Archives 1989 CSL Stats

=== West Division ===
Pos	Team	Pld	W	D	L	GF	GA	GD	Pts	Qualification
1	Vancouver 86ers	26	18	6	2	65	33	+32	42	Playoff semifinals
2	Edmonton Brick Men	26	9	3	14	44	55	−11	21	Playoff quarterfinals
3	Calgary Strikers	26	8	3	15	36	56	−20	19	Playoff quarterfinals
4	Winnipeg Fury	26	6	7	13	35	51	−16	19	
5	Victoria Vistas	26	4	6	16	32	53	−21	14	

Source: Canadian Soccer History Archives 1989 CSL Stats

=== Overall ===
Pos	Team	Pld	W	D	L	GF	GA	GD	Pts	Qualification
1	Vancouver 86ers (C)	26	18	6	2	65	33	+32	42	Playoff semifinals
2	Toronto Blizzard	26	16	6	4	48	27	+21	38	Playoff semifinals
3	Hamilton Steelers	26	15	7	4	56	28	+28	37	Playoff quarterfinals
4	North York Rockets	26	12	9	5	35	23	+12	33	Playoff quarterfinals
5	Ottawa Intrepid	26	7	8	11	41	46	−5	22	
6	Edmonton Brick Men	26	9	3	14	44	55	−11	21	Playoff quarterfinals
7	Calgary Strikers	26	8	3	15	36	56	−20	19	Playoff quarterfinals
8	Winnipeg Fury	26	6	7	13	35	51	−16	19	
9	Montreal Supra	26	3	9	14	26	46	−20	15	
10	Victoria Vistas	26	4	6	16	32	53	−21	14	

Source: Canadian Soccer History Archives 1989 CSL Stats
(C) Champion (qualified to 1990 North American Club Championship)

== Playoffs ==
Quarter-finals
2W	Edmonton Brick Men	3	0	3
3W	Calgary Strikers	1	0	1
2E	Hamilton Steelers	1	1	2
3E	North York Rockets	1	0	1

Semi-finals
1W	Vancouver 86ers	5	4	9
2W	Edmonton Brick Men	3	0	3
1E	Toronto Blizzard	1	1	2
2E	Hamilton Steelers	1	2	3

Final
1W	Vancouver 86ers	3
2E	Hamilton Steelers	2

=== Quarterfinal ===
September 13, 1989	Calgary Strikers	1–3	Edmonton Brick Men	Calgary, Alberta
	Smith 45'	[ Report]	Fashanu 21'; Rob Reed 38'; Jorge Rodriguez 91'	Stadium: Mewata Stadium; Attendance: 600

September 17, 1989	Edmonton Brick Men	0–0	Calgary Strikers	Edmonton, Alberta
16:00		[ Report]		Stadium: Clarke Stadium; Attendance: 878

Edmonton Brick Men won 3–1 on aggregate.

September 13, 1989	North York Rockets	1–1	Hamilton Steelers	North York, Ontario
	Berdusco 56'	[ Report]	Marinaro 82'	Stadium: Esther Shiner Stadium

September 17, 1989	Hamilton Steelers	1–0	North York Rockets	Hamilton, Ontario
19:30	Hector Chazaretta 13'	[ Report]		Stadium: Brian Timmis Stadium

Hamilton Steelers won 2–1 on aggregate.

=== Semifinal ===
September 20, 1989	Edmonton Brick Men	3–5	Vancouver 86ers	Edmonton, Alberta
18:00	Fashanu 7', 23'; Jorge Rodriguez 36'	[ Report]	Catliff 45'; Mitchell 60'; Mobilio 62'; Easton Jr. 73', 89'	Stadium: Clarke Stadium; Attendance: 1,000

September 24, 1989	Vancouver 86ers	4–0	Edmonton Brick Men	Vancouver, British Columbia
19:30	Mitchell, Easton Jr. Evans	[ Report]		Stadium: Swangard Stadium; Attendance: 5,772

Vancouver 86ers won 9–3 on aggregate.

September 20, 1989	Hamilton Steelers	1–1	Toronto Blizzard	Hamilton, Ontario
21:00	Gary Morrow	[ Report]	Fletcher	Stadium: Brian Timmis Stadium; Attendance: 2,200; Referee: Brian Smith

September 24, 1989	Toronto Blizzard	1–2	Hamilton Steelers	Etobicoke, Ontario
	Fletcher	[ Report]	Bunbury; Gasparini	Stadium: Centennial Park Stadium; Attendance: 4,500

Hamilton Steelers won 3–2 on aggregate.

=== Final ===
October 1, 1989	Vancouver 86ers	3–2	Hamilton Steelers	Vancouver, British Columbia
19:30	Muirhead 51'; Valentine 57'; Mobilio 67'	[ Report]	Gray 42'; Hector Chazaretta 76'	Stadium: Swangard Stadium; Attendance: 7,942; Referee: Derek Douglas

== Statistics ==
=== Top scorers ===
Rank	Player	Club	Goals
1	(United States) Ted Eck	Ottawa Intrepid	21
2	(England) Justin Fashanu	Edmonton Brick Men	17
3	(Argentina) Amadeo Gasparini	Hamilton Steelers	15
4	(Socialist Federal Republic of Yugoslavia) (Cyprus) Vladan Tomić	North York Rockets	14
5	(Canada) Billy Domazetis	Hamilton Steelers	13
6	(Scotland) Andy Smith	Calgary Strikers	11

=== Top goaltenders ===
Rank	Player	Club	GAA
1	(Canada) Paolo Ceccarelli	North York Rockets	0.58
2	(Canada) Paul Dolan	Hamilton Steelers	1.00
3	(Canada) Pat Harrington	Toronto Blizzard	1.04
4	(Canada) Pat Onstad	Winnipeg Fury	1.20
5	(Canada) Don Ferguson	North York Rockets	1.23

== Honours ==
The following awards and nominations were awarded for the 1989 season.

Award	Player	Team
Most Valuable Player	(England) Justin Fashanu	Edmonton Brick Men
Rookie of the Year	(Canada) Paul Peschisolido	Toronto Blizzard

=== League All-Stars ===
Player	Position
(Canada) Pat Harrington (Toronto Blizzard)	Goalkeeper
(Canada) Steve MacDonald (Vancouver 86ers)	Defender
(Canada) Peter Sarantopoulos (North York Rockets)	Defender
(Canada) Drew Ferguson (Hamilton Steelers)	Defender
(Canada) Trevor McCallum (Toronto Blizzard)	Defender
(Canada) Paul James (Ottawa Intrepid)	Midfielder
(Canada) Carl Valentine (Vancouver 86ers)	Midfielder
(Socialist Federal Republic of Yugoslavia) (Cyprus) Vladan Tomić (North York Rockets)	Midfielder
(United States) Ted Eck (Ottawa Intrepid)	Forward
(England) Justin Fashanu (Edmonton Brick Men)	Forward
(Argentina) Amadeo Gasparini (Hamilton Steelers)	Forward

Reserves

Player	Position
(Canada) Paul Dolan (Hamilton Steelers)	Goalkeeper
(Canada) Shaun Lowther (Winnipeg Fury)	Defender
(Canada) Joseph Majcher (Toronto Blizzard)	Midfielder
(Canada) John Catliff (Vancouver 86ers)	Forward

Front office

Person	Role
(Canada) Bob Lenarduzzi (Vancouver 86ers)	Head Coach
(Canada) Alan Errington (Vancouver 86ers)	Assistant Coach
(Canada) Mary Morris (Hamilton Steelers)	General Manager

== Average home attendances ==
Pos.	Team	GP	Average Attendance
1	Vancouver 86ers	26	4,951
2	Winnipeg Fury	26	4,404
3	Edmonton Brick Men	26	2,273
4	Toronto Blizzard	26	2,173
5	Victoria Vistas	26	2,039
6	North York Rockets	26	1,937
7	Montreal Supra	26	1,841
8	Hamilton Steelers	26	1,819
9	Ottawa Intrepid	26	1,357
10	Calgary Strikers	26	1,233
Total Attendance		260	2,403
