= Geoff Aunger =

Canadian soccer player

Personal information
- Full name: Geoffrey Edward Ramer Aunger
- Date of birth: 4 February 1968 (age 58)
- Place of birth: Red Deer, Alberta, Canada
- Height: 5 ft 11 in (1.80 m)
- Positions: Midfielder; defender; striker

Senior career*
Years	Team	Apps	(Gls)
1987	Vancouver 86ers	5	(0)
1988–1989	Winnipeg Fury	52	(19)
1990	Victoria Vistas	23	(8)
1991	Hamilton Steelers	27	(10)
1992	London Lasers	17	(8)
1993	Vancouver 86ers	11	(3)
1993–1994	Luton Town	6	(1)
1994	Chester City	5	(0)
1995–1996	Milwaukee Wave (indoor)	22	(10)
1995	Vancouver 86ers	18	(7)
1996	New England Revolution	29	(3)
1996–1997	Stockport County	1	(0)
1997	Seattle Sounders	24	(8)
1998–2000	D.C. United	74	(4)
2001	Colorado Rapids	1	(0)

International career
1992–1997	Canada	44	(4)
Medal record
Representing Canada
Men's Association football
North American Nations Cup
Third place	1991 United States
- * Club domestic league appearances and goals

Geoffrey "Geoff" Edward Ramer Aunger (born 4 February 1968) is a Canadian former soccer player. He played in various Canadian leagues and the lower tiers of the English leagues system before playing in the United States in the A-League and Major League Soccer. Aunger was also a member of the Canadian national soccer team member who play for striker and defensive midfielder.

== Club career ==
Aunger was born in Red Deer, Alberta. A striker and defensive midfielder later converted into a defender, playing both full-back and centre half, Aunger played youth soccer with the Coquitlam Metro-Ford Soccer Club. He began his professional career in 1987 in the Canadian Soccer League and played all six years of the league's existence and with five different teams. He started with the Vancouver 86ers and went on to play with the Winnipeg Fury, Victoria Vistas, Hamilton Steelers, London Lasers, and once more with the 86ers. He was the league's 7th leading scorer in 1988 with the Fury, 4th in 1991 with the Steelers and named a league All-Star in 1992, the final year of the league. He continued with the 86ers as they joined the APSL for the 1993 season, scoring 3 goals in 11 appearances. He was also a 1990 and 1991 All Canada soccer player with the British Columbia Institute of Technology.

=== Europe ===
Aunger tried out for Brentford but signed with Luton Town for the 1993–94 season for two years contract. Aunger scored two minutes into his debut match. He played 6 times for the Hatters first-team, having been dropped to the reserves after playing only 3 games, Aunger did not feature in Luton Town brave FA Cup run. He was not re-signed at the end of the season and later had a brief stint with Third Division Chester City.

In November 1994 he was given a trial at SK Brann in Norway.

=== United States ===
He rejoined the 86ers of the A-League and also played for the Milwaukee Wave of the indoor National Professional Soccer League. Aunger had 7 goals in 18 games with the 86ers in 1995.

Aunger played in the MLS for the New England Revolution in 1996, when he led the team in games and minutes played, while scoring 3 goals, all on penalties. He converted the first penalty kick in Revolution history on April 27, 1996, in the Revolution's home opener against D.C. United. The goal was the first ever scored by the Revolution at Foxboro Stadium. He tried his luck once more in England, this time with Stockport County but made but one appearance, as a substitute the day after signing. He then joined the A-League's Seattle Sounders.

A second chance in MLS in 1998 with D.C. United, as Aunger won in training camp the right-back position. After 6 matches he lost his starting position and spent rest the season in and out of the line-up. 1999 saw him however start 24 games for the team however as a midfielder, and won the 1999 MLS Championship with United. He was also the first Canadian to play in the MLS Cup final. In 2000, Geoff made 26 appearances for United. He was traded to the Colorado Rapids in 2001, and appeared in one game. In total, Aunger played 104 regular season MLS games and 9 Cup play-off contests.

== International career ==
He made his debut for Canada in a March 1991 North American Championship match against Mexico, but since this game was not regarded official he won his first senior cap coming on as a sub in an April 1992 friendly match against China. He earned a total of 44 caps, scoring 4 goals. He has represented Canada in 13 FIFA World Cup qualification matches. His final international was a November 1997 World Cup qualification match against Costa Rica, a game after which Alex Bunbury, Frank Yallop and Colin Miller also said farewell to the national team.

== Career statistics ==
Scores and results list Canada's goal tally first.

#	Date	Venue	Opponent	Score	Result	Competition
1	15 November 1992	Swangard Stadium, Burnaby, Canada	Bermuda	4–2	4–2	1994 FIFA World Cup qualification
2	15 July 1993	Estadio Azteca, Mexico City, Mexico	Martinique	1–0	2–2	1993 CONCACAF Gold Cup
3	1 August 1995	Varsity Stadium, Toronto, Canada	Jamaica	3–1	3–1	Caribana Cup
4	30 August 1996	Commonwealth Stadium, Edmonton, Canada	Panama	1–0	3–1	1998 FIFA World Cup qualification

== Honours ==
D.C. United

- Major League Soccer MLS Cup (1): 1999

Canada

- North American Nations Cup: 3rd place, 1991

Individual

- MLS All-Star, 1998
