= Tom Panhuyzen =

Canadian soccer player

Personal information
- Date of birth: 19 April 1965 (age 61)
- Place of birth: Toronto, Ontario, Canada
- Position: Defender

Senior career*
Years	Team	Apps	(Gls)
1987-1988	Ottawa Pioneers/Intrepid	30	(0)
1989	Hamilton Steelers	3	(0)
1989–1990	Toronto Blizzard	36	(1)
Total		69	(1)

International career
1987–1988	Canada	5	(0)
- * Club domestic league appearances and goals

Tom Panhuyzen (born 19 April 1965) is a Canadian former international soccer player who played as a defender.

== Career ==
Born in Toronto, Panhuyzen played club soccer for the Ottawa Pioneers, Ottawa Intrepid, Hamilton Steelers and Toronto Blizzard. He earned 5 caps for the Canada national team between 1987 and 1988.
