= Luis Valdez (disambiguation) =

Luis Valdez (born 1940) is an American playwright, screenwriter, film director and actor.

Luis Valdez may also refer to:

- Luis Valdéz (footballer) (born 1965), Mexican footballer
- Luis Valdez Farías (born 1979), Peruvian politician
- Luis Valdez (baseball) (born 1983), Dominican baseball player better known as Jairo Asencio

== See also ==
- Luis Valdés (1923–2021), Cuban-American surgeon
- Luis Valdés Larraín (1913–2004), Chilean lawyer, farmer and politician
