= Patrick Diotte =

Canadian soccer player

Personal information
- Full name: Patrick Diotte
- Date of birth: 13 November 1967 (age 58)
- Place of birth: Longueuil, Quebec
- Height: 5 ft 9 in (1.75 m)
- Position: Defender

Senior career*
Years	Team	Apps	(Gls)
1987	National Capital Pioneers	8	(1)
1988–1992	Montreal Supra	119	(2)
1993–2001	Montreal Impact	186	(0)
Total		313	(3)

International career^{‡}
1991–1995	Canada	5	(0)
Medal record
Representing Canada
Men's Association football
North American Nations Cup
Winner	1990 Canada
Third place	1991 United States
- * Club domestic league appearances and goals as of 30 June 2009 ‡ National team caps and goals as of 30 June 2009

Patrick Diotte (born November 13, 1967) is a former soccer player from Canada.

== Club career ==
Born in Longueuil, Quebec, Diotte started his professional career with the Ottawa Pioneers before moving to Montreal Supra in 1988. He spent the rest of his career at Supra and Montreal Impact.

== International career ==
A defender, Diotte made his debut for Canada in a friendly match against the United States in March 1991. He earned a total of 5 caps, scoring no goals.

His final international game was a friendly match against Chile in October 1995.

== Honours ==
Canada

- North American Nations Cup: 1990; 3rd place, 1991
