= Lyndon Hooper =

Canadian soccer player (born 1966)

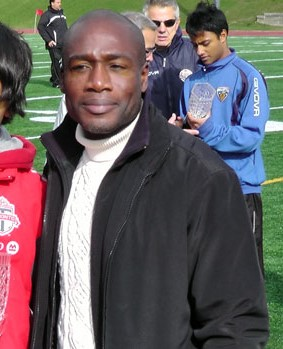
- Hooper in 2010

Personal information
- Full name: Lyndon Fitzgerald Hooper
- Date of birth: May 30, 1966 (age 60)
- Place of birth: Georgetown, Guyana
- Height: 5 ft 8 in (1.73 m)
- Position: Midfielder

Senior career*
Years	Team	Apps	(Gls)
1986	Toronto Blizzard		
1987	National Capital Pioneers	18	(0)
1988	Montreal Supra	28	(2)
1990–1992	Toronto Blizzard	83	(11)
1993–1994	Birmingham City	5	(0)
1995–1996	Cincinnati Silverbacks (indoor)	20	(12)
1996	Chicago Power (indoor)	1	(0)
1996–1997	Toronto Shooting Stars (indoor)	8	(1)
1996–1998	Montreal Impact	53	(3)
1997–1998	Montreal Impact (indoor)	33	(2)
1999	Hampton Roads Mariners	19	(2)
2000–2001	Toronto Lynx	42	(1)
2005	Toronto Lynx	2	(0)

International career
1986–1997	Canada	68	(2)

Managerial career
- 2005: Toronto Lynx (assistant coach)
Medal record
Representing Canada
Men's Association football
North American Nations Cup
Third place	1991 United States
- * Club domestic league appearances and goals

Lyndon Hooper (born May 30, 1966) is a Canadian former professional soccer player and former assistant coach of the Toronto Lynx soccer team of the United Soccer Leagues First Division. A former midfielder, he was a prominent Canadian international.

== Club career ==
Guyana-born but moving to Ottawa at age 11, Hooper turned professional in 1987 with the Ottawa Intrepid of the Canadian Soccer League. He continued to play for Wilfrid Laurier University in the autumns from 1986 to 1990 and was named second-team CIAU all-Canadian in 1986 and 1987. In 1986, he played in the National Soccer League with Toronto Blizzard. He went on to play for CSL teams the Montreal Supra, and returned to Toronto Blizzard in 1990.

The 5'8, 160 lbs. Hooper played in the Football League with Birmingham City in the 1993–94 season. His first game for Birmingham City was on 6 October 1993; a second city derby away at Aston Villa where Birmingham lost 1–0. Hooper returned to North America to play for A-League teams the Montreal Impact from 1994 to 1998, Hampton Roads Mariners in 1999, and Toronto Lynx, retiring as a player with the Lynx in 2001. Hooper played amateur soccer for Scarborough GS United in the 2005–06 season. The team won the Senior (open age) Men's Canadian Club Championship.

== International career ==
Hooper is the sixth most capped player in the history of the Canadian national team, having made 68 'A' team appearances (scoring 2 goals) between 1986 and 1997. He made his debut for Canada in an August 1986 Merlion Cup match against Singapore. He represented Canada in 18 FIFA World Cup qualification matches. His final international was a June 1997 World Cup qualification match against Costa Rica. He also represented Canada at the inaugural 1989 FIFA Futsal World Championship.

== Post-retirement ==
When he retired from soccer he served as a sports consultant with the Toronto Sports Council and earned his Level "B" coaching license while coaching the U17 Ontario Provincial Team. On March 3, 2005 he was appointed the new assistant coach for the Toronto Lynx, under Hubert Busby Jr. But when the Lynx finished with a league worst 3 wins, 17 losses, and 8 ties, the worst performance in league history, he and Busby both left their coaching roles after one season with the club.

Hooper has established a soccer camp in the Durham Region of Ontario, where he resides. The camp focuses on developing Canadian homegrown talent.

Hooper currently works for Ontario Soccer as the Coordinator, Coach Development.

== Personal life ==
Hooper's sister is star soccer player Charmaine Hooper and Ian Hooper, a former professional and collegiate soccer player at NC State and current Director of Business Operations for the Ottawa Champions Baseball Club. Hooper is married to Jennifer Beckford and has two kids, Trey and Taylor Hooper. He was born and raised in Georgetown, Guyana then moved to Canada in 1978.

== Career statistics ==
Scores and results list Canada's goal tally first.

#	Date	Venue	Opponent	Score	Result	Competition
1	26 March 1988	Lima, Peru	Peru	1–1	3–1	Friendly match
2	15 August 1993	Sydney Football Stadium, Sydney, Australia	Australia	1–1	1–2	1994 FIFA World Cup qualification

== Honours ==
Canada

- North American Nations Cup: 3rd place, 1991
