= Mark Watson (soccer, born 1970) =

Canadian soccer player

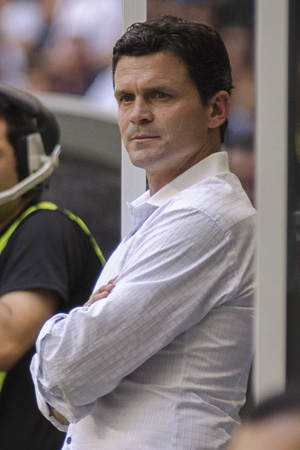
- Watson in 2013

Personal information
- Full name: Mark Stewart Watson
- Date of birth: 8 September 1970 (age 56)
- Place of birth: Vancouver, British Columbia, Canada
- Height: 6 ft 1 in (1.85 m)
- Position: Defender

Team information
- Current team: HFX Wanderers

Youth career
- UBC Thunderbirds

Senior career*
Years	Team	Apps	(Gls)
1990	Ottawa Intrepid	22	(0)
1991	Hamilton Steelers	23	(1)
1992	Montreal Supra	18	(1)
1993–1994	Vancouver 86ers	10	(0)
1993–1995	Watford	18	(0)
1996	Columbus Crew	14	(0)
1996	New England Revolution	4	(1)
1997	Seattle Sounders	21	(1)
1997–1999	Östers IF	24	(0)
1998–2000	Oxford United	58	(0)
2000–2001	Oldham Athletic	2	(0)
2001	D.C. United	11	(0)
2002–2004	Charleston Battery	70	(3)
2005	Vancouver Whitecaps	17	(0)
2006–2007	Charleston Battery	20	(0)
Total		332	(7)

International career
1991–2004	Canada	78	(3)

Managerial career
- 2004–2008: Canada (assistant)
- 2006–2009: Charleston Battery (assistant)
- 2007–2010: Canada U20 (assistant)
- 2010–2013: San Jose Earthquakes (assistant)
- 2013: San Jose Earthquakes (interim)
- 2013–2014: San Jose Earthquakes
- 2014–2016: Orlando City (assistant)
- 2017–2019: Minnesota United (assistant)
- 2019–2023: Minnesota United (technical director)
- 2024–: HFX Wanderers (football advisor)
Medal record
Representing Canada
Men's Association football
CONCACAF Gold Cup
Winner	2000 United States
North American Nations Cup
Third place	1991 United States
- * Club domestic league appearances and goals

Mark Stewart Watson (born 8 September 1970) is a Canadian former professional soccer player who currently works as a Senior Football Strategy Advisor (GM) at Halifax Wanderers FC . A former defender, Watson is the eighth most-capped player in the history of the Canada national team.

== Club career ==
Watson spent 18 years as a professional soccer player. He spent three seasons with Watford FC of the English Championship from 1993 to 1995 and then joined Major League Soccer for its inaugural season in 1996. He split that first MLS season between the New England Revolution and Columbus Crew. Watson returned to MLS in 2001 with D.C. United after stops with the Seattle Sounders, Oxford United and Oldham Athletic.

== International career ==
For Canada, Watson has appeared 78 times for the 'A' national team during a 14-year span. He has played in four World Cup qualifying campaigns. and on the 2000 CONCACAF Gold Cup side that won the tournament. Watson scored the winning goal for Canada in the semi-final of the 2000 Gold Cup, a match Canada won 1–0 over Trinidad and Tobago.

== Coaching career ==
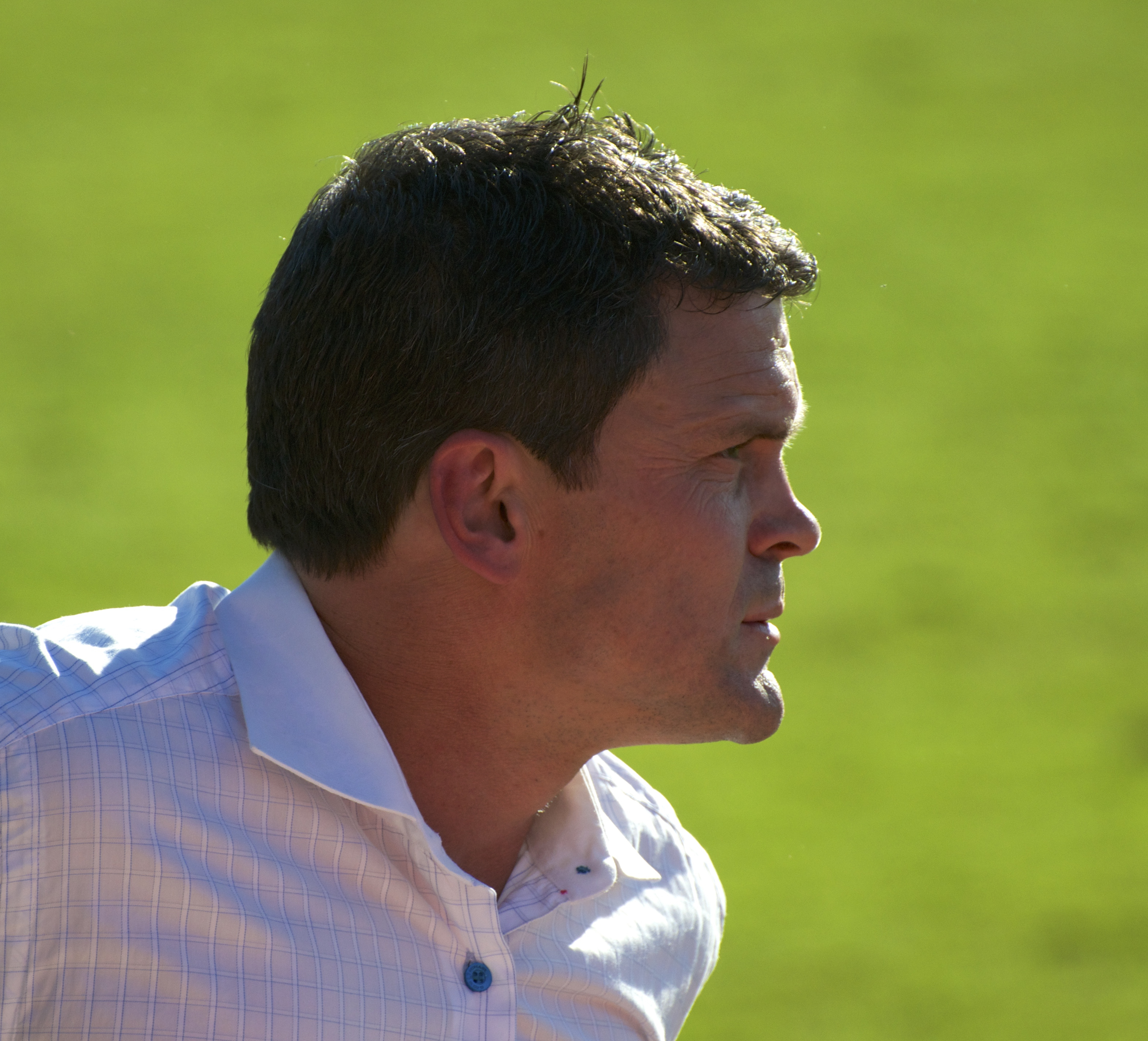
Coaching the Earthquakes in 2013

Watson began his coaching career in 2004 with the Canadian national team system where he held assistant positions with the U-20 and senior squads. Watson served as assistant coach for Canada at the 2004 CONCACAF Men's Olympic Qualification Tournament and was an assistant when the team finished third in the same tournament in 2008. He also spent four seasons on the staff of his former playing club Charleston Battery as an assistant to Mike Anhaeuser from 2006 to 2009, helping lead Charleston to the final of the 2008 Lamar Hunt U.S. Open Cup.

After spending several seasons with San Jose Earthquakes as an assistant to his Canadian colleague Frank Yallop, Watson became the club's interim head coach on 7 June 2013 following Yallop's dismissal. Watson's first win as an MLS head coach came on 15 June 2013 against the Colorado Rapids at Dick's Sporting Goods Park. Watson was 11–5–3 during his 19 league games as interim coach, nearly rallying the Earthquakes to an MLS Cup Playoff berth. His mark 1.89 points per game was tops among all coaches after he took over. In addition to his success in MLS, Watson's squad advanced to the 2013–14 CONCACAF Champions League quarter-finals by winning Group 5. Following these successes, on 30 October 2013 the Earthquakes announced that they had signed Watson to a permanent contract, thereby removing his interim status. After a disappointing season in which the Earthquakes failed to qualify for the playoffs, Watson was dismissed in late 2014.

He was hired as an assistant coach at Orlando City Soccer Club for their inaugural Major League Soccer season on 10 November 2014.

He was fired by Orlando City in July 2016.

On 18 January 2017, he was named assistant coach for Major League Soccer side Minnesota United FC.

On 28 October 2024, Watson joined Canadian Premier League side HFX Wanderers as the club's Senior Football Strategy Advisor. In this role, Watson would advise club president Derek Martin regarding player recruitment and football operations.

== Career statistics ==
Scores and results list Canada's goal tally first, score column indicates score after each Watson goal.

List of international goals scored by Mark Watson
No.	Date	Venue	Opponent	Score	Result	Competition
1	31 July 1993	Commonwealth Stadium, Edmonton, Canada	Australia	1–1	2–1	1994 FIFA World Cup qualification
2	15 December 1996	Estadio Cuscatlán, San Salvador, El Salvador	El Salvador	1–0	2–0	1998 FIFA World Cup qualification
3	24 February 2000	Los Angeles Memorial Coliseum, Los Angeles, United States	Trinidad and Tobago	1–0	1–0	CONCACAF Gold Cup

== Coaching record ==
As of 23 August 2014

Team	From	To	Record				
Team	From	To	G	W	D	L	Win %
San Jose Earthquakes	7 June 2013	15 October 2014	51	17	20	14	33.33

== Honours ==
Charleston Battery

- USL A-League: 2003

Canada

- CONCACAF Gold Cup: 2000
- North American Nations Cup: 3rd place, 1991

Individual

- Canadian Player of the Year: 1997
- Canadian Soccer Hall of Fame: 2008
