= John Limniatis =

Former soccer player (born 1967)

Ioannis Limniatis
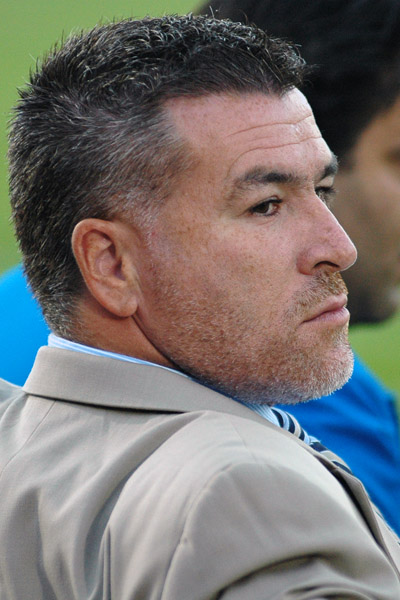
- Limniatis in 2008

Personal information
- Date of birth: 24 June 1967 (age 59)
- Place of birth: Athens, Greece
- Height: 6 ft 0 in (1.83 m)
- Position: Midfielder

Senior career*
Years	Team	Apps	(Gls)
1987–1988	Ottawa Pioneers/Intrepid	28	(0)
1988–1992	Aris	94	(1)
1992–1993	Panetolikos	20	(0)
1993–1998	Montreal Impact	126	(2)
1999	Charleston Battery	25	(0)
2000–2001	Montreal Impact	24	(0)
Total		317	(3)

International career
1987–1997	Canada	44	(1)

Managerial career
- 2008–2009: Montreal Impact
Medal record
Representing Canada
Men's Association football
North American Nations Cup
Winner	1990 Canada
- * Club domestic league appearances and goals

Ioannis "John" Limniatis (Greek: Ιωάννης "Τζον" Λημνιάτης; born 24 June 1967) is a retired professional soccer player who played as a midfielder. He captained and later became the head coach of the Montreal Impact. Born in Greece, he made 44 appearances scoring one goal for the Canada national team.

== Club career ==
Before migrating to Canada with his family, Limniatis in 1977, used to train with the players of Greek Third Division side Ilisiakos in the 1970s, taking shots at legendary Greek goalkeeper Nikos Sarganis.

After beginning his pro career in 1987 with the Ottawa Pioneers of the Canadian Soccer League, he became the first ever Canadian to be sold to a European first division team. He was transferred for a fee of $50.000. Limniatis played professionally in Greece with First Division side Aris from 1988 to 1992 and Panetolikos from 1992 to 1993. He then joined the Montreal Impact in the summer of 1993 and remained with the club until 1998. After a brief spell in the United States on loan with Charleston Battery, Limniatis returned to the Impact playing 24 more games in the 2000–01 season. Liminatis played both outdoors in the A-League and indoors in the National Professional Soccer League both with the Impact and the Kansas City Attack in 1995–96.

Limniatis was named 1994 A-League Rookie of the Year and 1996 and '97 Defender of the Year.

He's a member of both the Canadian & the Quebec Soccer Hall of Fame, inducted in 2009.

He is also the 1st ever soccer person to be inducted in the Quebec Sports Hall of Fame (Pantheon des sports du Quebec), inducted in 2012.

== International career ==
Limniatis made his debut for Canada in a September 1987 friendly match against El Salvador, He earned a total of 44 caps, scoring 1 goal. He has represented Canada in 8 FIFA World Cup qualification matches in three unsuccessful World Cup qualifying campaigns.

His final international game was a March 1997 World Cup qualification match against the United States.

== Coaching career ==
Limniatis spent his last years with the Impact as their assistant coach, indoor head coach, and later director of operations. He was coach for the Montreal Impact until Marc Dos Santos was named as interim head coach following Limniatis' termination by the Impact board.

== Personal life ==
Limniatis's hometown is Laval, Quebec, Limniatis has two daughters, Alexia and Nikki. His cousin, Giorgos Limniatis, is a former professional basketball player who played in Greece.

== Career statistics ==
Scores and results list Canada's goal tally first.

#	Date	Venue	Opponent	Score	Result	Competition
1	3 July 1991	Memorial Coliseum, Los Angeles, United States	Jamaica	3-1	3-2	1991 CONCACAF Gold Cup

== Honours ==
Canada

- North American Nations Cup: 1990
