= North American Football Union =

Regional body of CONCACAF for association football in the North American Zone

North American Football Union Unión Norteamericana de Fútbol Union Nord-Américaine de Football
- Members of NAFU (orange).
- Abbreviation: NAFU
- Formation: 1990
- Type: Regional body of CONCACAF
- Region served: Northern America (Note: Includes Mexico.)
- Members: 3 members: Canada; Mexico; United States
- Official language: English; Spanish; French

The North American Football Union (Spanish: Unión Norteamericana de Fútbol; French: Union Nord-Américaine de Football), also known by its acronym NAFU, is a regional body of CONCACAF for association football in the North American Zone. Officially established in 1990; it has 3 member associations: Canada, Mexico and the United States. The NAFU has no organizational structure, but it provides one of CONCACAF's representatives to the FIFA Executive Committee.

The NAFU organized its premier regional competition for national teams, which was the North American Nations Cup; however; its member associations have organized club competitions: North American SuperLiga, Campeones Cup and Leagues Cup. Currently, the premier club competition for the North American Zone is the Leagues Cup, organized by the Major League Soccer and the Liga MX.

== Members ==
Code	Country	Association	Acronym
CAN	Canada	Canadian Soccer Association	CSA
MEX	Mexico	Mexican Football Federation	FMF
USA	United States	United States Soccer Federation	USSF

== Competitions ==
=== North American Nations Cup ===
The North American Football Union organized 2 North American Nations Cups in 1990 and 1991 to contest on the North American zone before the CONCACAF Gold Cup was introduced.

- 1990 North American Nations Cup
- 1991 North American Nations Cup
- 1992 North American Nations Cup (cancelled)

The 1992 edition was cancelled because Mexico and United States decided to enter the Amistad Cup instead.

=== Clubs ===
The Leagues Cup is a club tournament between teams from Major League Soccer and Liga MX that was established in 2019. It is the North American Zone's regional qualification tournament for the CONCACAF Champions League.

The North American SuperLiga was a club tournament between two North American zone leagues that ran from 2007 to 2010. It was an official tournament sanctioned by CONCACAF, but not organized by the federation. When zone qualifiers were used for the CONCACAF Champions Cup, Bermudian clubs played against Mexican and/or American clubs.

The Campeones Cup is an annual super cup match established in 2018. It is held between the winners of the previous Major League Soccer season and the winners of the Campeón de Campeones of Liga MX.

== Major tournament records ==
Legend

- 1st – Champion
- 2nd – Runner-up
- 3rd – Third place
- 4th – Fourth place
- QF – Quarter-finals
- R16 – Round of 16 (since 1986)
- 2R – Second group stage (1982)
- GS – Group stage (1930 and since 1950)
- 1R – First round (1934 and 1938)
- q – Qualified for upcoming tournament
- • — Did not qualify
- — Did not enter/withdrew
- × — Banned
- — Hosts

=== FIFA World Cup ===
Team	(Uruguay) 1930	(Italy) 1934	(France) 1938	(Brazil) 1950	(Switzerland) 1954	(Sweden) 1958	(Chile) 1962	(England) 1966	(Mexico) 1970	(West Germany) 1974	(Argentina) 1978	(Spain) 1982	(Mexico) 1986	(Italy) 1990	(United States) 1994	(France) 1998	(South Korea) (Japan) 2002	(Germany) 2006	(South Africa) 2010	(Brazil) 2014	(Russia) 2018	(Qatar) 2022	(Canada) (Mexico) (United States) 2026	Years	Inclusive WC qual.
Canada						•			•	•	•	•	GS	•	•	•	•	•	•	•	•	GS	R16	3	16
Mexico	GS	•		GS	GS	GS	GS	GS	QF	•	GS	•	QF	×	R16	R16	R16	R16	R16	R16	R16	GS	R16	18	21
United States	3rd	1R		GS	•	•	•	•	•	•	•	•	•	GS	R16	GS	QF	GS	R16	R16	•	R16	R16	12	22
Total	2	1	0	2	1	1	1	1	1	0	1	0	2	1	2	2	2	2	2	2	1	3	3	33	–

=== FIFA Women's World Cup ===
Team	(China) 1991	(Sweden) 1995	(United States) 1999	(United States) 2003	(China) 2007	(Germany) 2011	(Canada) 2015	(France) 2019	(Australia) (New Zealand) 2023	Years	Inclusive WC Qual.
Canada	•	GS	GS	4th	GS	GS	QF	R16	GS	8	9
Mexico	•	•	GS	•	•	GS	GS	•	•	3	9
United States	1st	3rd	1st	3rd	3rd	2nd	1st	1st	R16	9	9
Total	1	2	3	2	3	3	3	2	2	16	

=== FIFA Confederations Cup ===
Team	1992 (Saudi Arabia)	1995 (Saudi Arabia)	1997 (Saudi Arabia)	1999 (Mexico)	2001 (South Korea) (Japan)	2003 (France)	2005 (Germany)	2009 (South Africa)	2013 (Brazil)	2017 (Russia)	Years
Canada	•	•	•	×	GS	•	•	•	•	•	1
Mexico	•	3rd	GS	1st	GS	•	4th	•	GS	4th	7
United States	3rd	•	•	3rd	•	GS	•	2nd	•	•	4
Total	1	1	1	2	2	1	1	1	1	1	12

== See also ==
- Central American Football Union
- Caribbean Football Union
- North American Football Confederation
- Central American and Caribbean Football Confederation
