= Gerry Gray (soccer) =

Soccer player (born 1961)

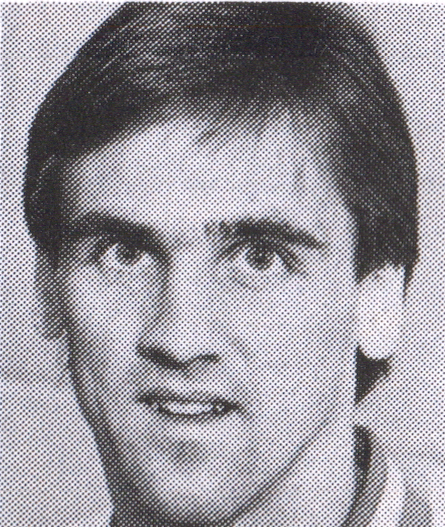
- Gray circa 1984

Personal information
- Full name: Gerard Gray
- Date of birth: 20 January 1961 (age 65)
- Place of birth: Glasgow, Scotland, United Kingdom
- Height: 1.75 m (5 ft 9 in)
- Position: Midfielder

Senior career*
Years	Team	Apps	(Gls)
1980–1982	Vancouver Whitecaps	82	(13)
1979–1982	Vancouver Whitecaps (indoor)	32	(29)
1982–1983	Golden Bay Earthquakes (indoor)	36	(11)
1983	Montreal Manic	25	(3)
1983–1984	New York Cosmos (indoor)	28	(14)
1984	New York Cosmos	13	(1)
1984	Chicago Sting	6	(0)
1984–1986	Chicago Sting (indoor)	49	(37)
1986–1987	Tacoma Stars (indoor)	50	(15)
1987–1988	St. Louis Steamers (indoor)	49	(20)
1988	Ottawa Intrepid	23	(3)
1988–1990	Tacoma Stars (indoor)	73	(19)
1989	Hamilton Steelers	23	(3)
1989–1990	Kansas City Comets (indoor)	12	(3)
1990	Toronto Blizzard	19	(0)
1991	Hamilton Steelers	13	(0)
1991	Toronto Blizzard	13	(2)

International career
1980–1991	Canada	35	(2)

Managerial career
- 2010–2012: Tacoma F.C.
Medal record
Representing Canada
Men's Association football
North American Nations Cup
Winner	1990 Canada
Third place	1991 United States
- * Club domestic league appearances and goals

Gerard "Gerry" Gray (born 20 January 1961) is a former soccer player. Born in Scotland, he represented and coached the Canadian national soccer team.

== Club career ==
Born and raised in Scotland, Gray moved to Toronto, Ontario with his family at the age of 12 and played for several teams in Canada and the United States in the NASL. In 1982 Gray was named to the NASL's first North American All-Star team.

Gray also played indoor soccer in the original MISL for the Chicago Sting as well as the Tacoma Stars.

Gray played outdoors again in the Canadian Soccer League with the Ottawa Intrepid in 1988, Hamilton Steelers in 1989, Toronto Blizzard in 1990, the Steelers again in 1991, and then the Blizzard again in the same year.

In April 2001, Gray was inducted into the Canadian Soccer Hall of Fame.

== International career ==
Gray was a member of the national youth team that played in the 1979 FIFA World Youth Championship in Japan. He made his senior debut on 15 September 1980 for Canada in a 4–0 victory against New Zealand in a friendly match in Vancouver. Gray earned a total of 35 caps, scoring 2 goals, one of which came via a stunning free kick versus Mexico in a 1982 World Cup qualifier in Mexico City.

He represented Canada in 11 FIFA World Cup qualification matches and played in two of Canada's games at the 1986 FIFA World Cup finals, the country's first appearance at a World Cup finals. He also played for Canada at the 1984 Olympics.

His final appearance came in a 0–2 defeat in a March 1991 North American Nations Cup match against the United States in Torrance, California.

He was named Mississauga's Professional Athlete of the Year in 1980, and he was inducted into the Mississauga Sports Hall of Fame in 1995.

=== International goals ===
Scores and results list Canada's goal tally first.

#	Date	Venue	Opponent	Score	Result	Competition
1	16 November 1980	Estadio Azteca, Mexico City, Mexico	Mexico	1–1	1–1	1982 FIFA World Cup qualification
2	10 May 1986	Varsity Stadium, Toronto, Canada	Wales	2–0	2–0	Friendly match

== Managerial career ==
On 8 April 2010, Gray was appointed the head coach for the Tacoma F.C. of the USL Premier Development League.

== Honours ==
Canada

- North American Nations Cup: 1990; 3rd place, 1991
