= Pat Onstad =

Canadian soccer player (born 1968)

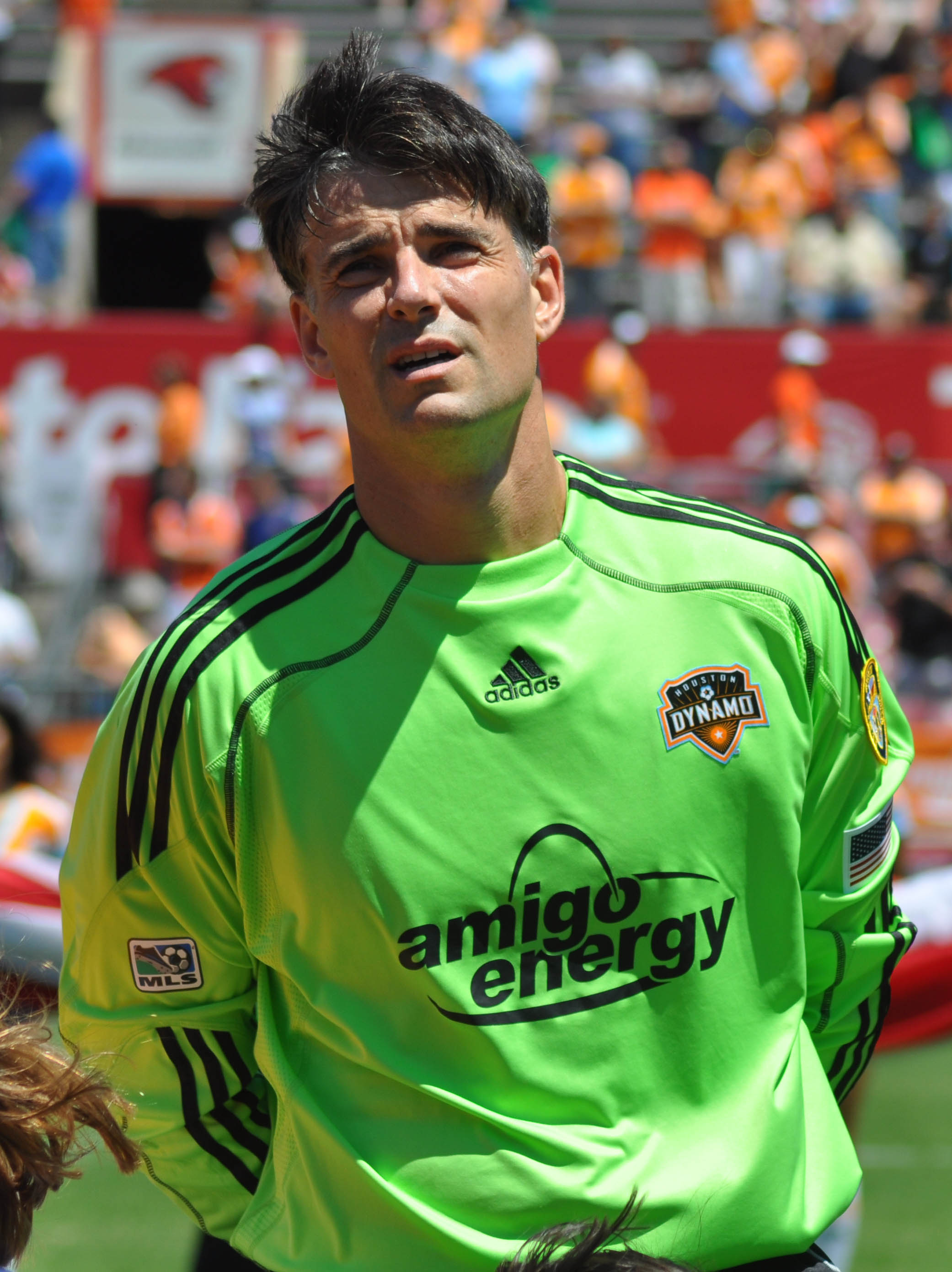
- Onstad in 2009

Personal information
- Full name: Patrick Stewart Onstad
- Date of birth: January 13, 1968 (age 58)
- Place of birth: Vancouver, British Columbia, Canada
- Height: 6 ft 4 in (1.93 m)
- Position: Goalkeeper

Team information
- Current team: Houston Dynamo FC (general manager)

Youth career
- 1985–1987: UBC Thunderbirds

Senior career*
Years	Team	Apps	(Gls)
1987	Vancouver 86ers	13	(0)
1989	Winnipeg Fury	19	(0)
1990–1991	Toronto Blizzard	53	(0)
1992–1993	Winnipeg Fury	20	(0)
1994	Toronto Rockets	20	(0)
1995	Montreal Impact	7	(0)
1996	Edmonton Drillers (indoor)	19	(0)
1997	Toronto Lynx	19	(0)
1998–1999	Rochester Raging Rhinos	49	(0)
1999–2001	Dundee United	0	(0)
2001–2002	Rochester Raging Rhinos	21	(0)
2003–2005	San Jose Earthquakes	84	(0)
2006–2010	Houston Dynamo	136	(0)
2011	D.C. United	3	(0)
Total		432	(0)

International career
1988–2010	Canada	60	(0)

Managerial career
- 2011–2013: D.C. United (assistant)
- 2013: Toronto FC (chief scout)
- 2014–2018: Columbus Crew SC (assistant)
- 2019–2021: Columbus Crew SC (technical director)
- 2021–: Houston Dynamo FC (general manager)
Medal record
Representing Canada
Men's soccer
CONCACAF Gold Cup
Winner	2000 United States
North American Nations Cup
Third place	1991 United States
- * Club domestic league appearances and goals

Patrick Stewart Onstad (born January 13, 1968) is a Canadian former professional soccer goalkeeper who serves as the General Manager of the Houston Dynamo. During his career, Onstad played with a variety of clubs in Canada and the United States and was a three-time winner of MLS Cup. He was inducted into the Canadian Soccer Hall of Fame in November 2015.

== Youth and college ==
Onstad began playing organized soccer with the West Point Grey, Marpole United, and Coquitlam Metro-Ford youth soccer clubs. He then went on to tend goal at the University of British Columbia, who he led to three CIAU National Championships. He was also a two-time Academic All-Canadian, and holds degrees in Human Kinetics and Education.

== Club career ==
After graduating, Onstad joined the Vancouver 86ers of the Canadian Soccer League in 1987. From 1988 to 1989, he played for the Winnipeg Fury, also of the CSL. He moved to a third CSL team, the Toronto Blizzard, for 1990 and 1991. Onstad returned to the Fury in 1992, winning both the CSL Championship and the CSL Goalkeeper of the Year Award.

Onstad moved to the APSL in 1994, playing for the Toronto Rockets. After a season with the Rockets, he moved to the Montreal Impact for 1995. In 1996, he played indoor soccer for the Edmonton Drillers of the NPSL. He returned to outdoor soccer in 1997, playing for the Toronto Lynx, again of the A-League.

=== United States and Scotland ===
In 1998, Onstad moved to his first American team, the Rochester Raging Rhinos, with whom he won the A-League title, and was also named the league's Goalkeeper of the Year, after allowing only 13 goals in 26 regular season games. Onstad remained with Rochester for 1999, was named All-League second team, and helped the Rhinos become the only lower league team to win the U.S. Open Cup since the foundation of Major League Soccer.

In 1999, Onstad was signed by Dundee United of Scotland for the 1999–2000 and 2000–2001 seasons, but as third-string goal keeper behind Alan Combe and Paul Gallacher, he did not see any playing time with the first team.

He returned to Rochester in 2001, and although a wrist injury kept him out of action for most of the year, he finished second in the league in goals against the following year.

=== Major League Soccer ===
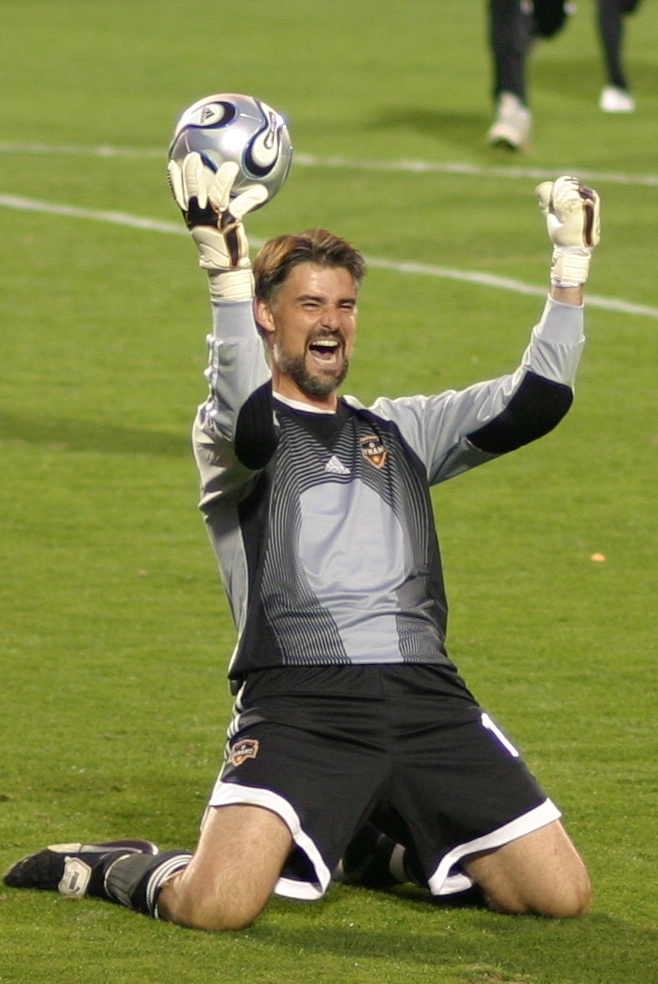
Onstad celebrating winning the 2006 MLS Cup with Houston Dynamo

On March 13, 2003, Onstad was signed as a discovery player by the San Jose Earthquakes as a replacement for Joe Cannon. Onstad filled in quite well, helping lead the Earthquakes to their second MLS Cup in three years, and winning the MLS Goalkeeper of the Year Award.

He had another excellent year in 2005, supporting the Earthquakes as they went undefeated at home (the first time any team did that in MLS history) and winning the MLS Supporters' Shield, and winning the MLS Goalkeeper of the Year Award for a second time. He was named to the MLS Best XI in both 2003 and 2005. Along with the rest of his Earthquakes teammates, he moved to Houston for the 2006 season. Onstad played every minute of the regular season for the Dynamo.

After the 2010 MLS season Houston declined Onstad's contract option. He elected to participate in the 2010 MLS Re-Entry Draft, but was not selected in the Re-Entry draft. Shortly thereafter, Onstad announced his retirement on December 21, 2010.

== International career ==
Onstad played for Canada at the 1987 FIFA World Youth Championship and the 1987 Pan American Games.

Onstad made his senior debut for the Canadian national team on February 18, 1988, against Bermuda, and played a total of 60 games over a 22-year period for the squad. He represented Canada in 15 FIFA World Cup qualification matches in three unsuccessful World Cup qualifying campaigns. His final official international game was an August 2008 World Cup qualification match against Jamaica. He played his last match for Canada in a friendly against Argentina on 24 May 2010, thus becoming the oldest player in Canada's history at the age of 42 years and 131 days, breaking the previous record set by David Norman in 1994.

== Coaching career ==
Onstad joined D.C. United as an assistant coach alongside Chad Ashton. It was announced on February 17, 2011, that Onstad would come out of retirement to play for D.C. due to the injuries to Steve Cronin and Bill Hamid. His contract with D.C. United expired on May 31, 2011, and Onstad returned solely to his duties as an assistant coach. Onstad left D.C. in January 2013.

He joined Toronto FC as Chief Scout and Manager of Football Partnerships. Shortly after the firings of general manager Kevin Payne, and director of team and player operations Earl Cochrane, Onstad left the organization.

On January 10, 2014, he joined Columbus Crew SC as an assistant coach, with head coach Gregg Berhalter stating that "Pat is very professional in how he approaches the game, and he brings versatility to his new role. He has great league experience and a winning pedigree, and those are attributes that attracted us to bringing him onboard." When Gregg Berhalter left Columbus to coach the United States men's national soccer team, Onstad was promoted to technical director by Crew president and general manager Tim Bezbachenko.

On November 1, 2021, Onstad was hired as general manager of the Houston Dynamo.

== Honours ==
Rochester Rhinos

- A-League Championship: 1998, 2001
- A-League Commissioner's Cup: 1998, 1999
- Lamar Hunt U.S. Open Cup: 1999
- Eastern Conference Championship: 1998, 1999
- Northeast Division Champs: 1998, 1999, 2002

San Jose Earthquakes

- Major League Soccer MLS Cup: 2003
- Major League Soccer Supporters Shield: 2005
- Major League Soccer Western Conference Championship: 2003
- Major League Soccer Western Conference Championship: (Regular Season) 2003, 2005

Houston Dynamo

- Major League Soccer MLS Cup: 2006, 2007
- Major League Soccer Western Conference Championship: 2006, 2007

Canada

- CONCACAF Gold Cup: 2000
- North American Nations Cup: 3rd place, 1991

Canada U20

- CONCACAF U-20 Championship: 1986

Individual

- MLS Goalkeeper of the Year: 2003, 2005
- MLS Best XI: 2003, 2005
- Canadian Player of the Year: 2003
- A-League Goalkeeper of the Year: 1998
- A-League: First Team: 1998, Second Team 1999
- MLS Save of the Year: 2009
- Rochester Rhinos Hall of Fame: 2012
- Canadian Soccer Hall of Fame: 2015
