= Ottawa Intrepid =

Former soccer team in Ottawa, Ontario

National Capital Pioneers (1987) Ottawa Intrepid (1988–90)
- Founded: 1987
- Dissolved: 1990
- Stadium: Aydelu Park (Aylmer, QC); Terry Fox Stadium (Ottawa, ON)
- Capacity: approx. 2,000
- Owner: Ottawa Professional Soccer Society
- League: Canadian Soccer League

Ottawa Intrepid was a professional soccer team based in Ottawa, Ontario that competed in the original Canadian Soccer League. They were founded as the National Capital Pioneers (also spelled National Capitals Pioneers) and played in Aylmer, Quebec in 1987, before being re-structured for 1988 as the Ottawa Intrepid and moving to Ottawa.

== History ==
The club was an original member of the original Canadian Soccer League founded in 1987, under the ownership of local businessman Earl Himes. In their inaugural season they were known as the National Capital Pioneers.

The Pioneers played their home games in 1987 across the Ottawa river at Aydelu Park in Aylmer, Quebec. With the CSL adopting the playing rules of FIFA in which games must be played on natural grass, the Pioneers were forced to play in Alymer since Lansdowne Park, a much larger CFL football stadium in the city of Ottawa, had artificial surface which forced the club to seek a playing surface in Aylmer, QC for the 1987 season. Aylmer offered the club 51% of the park plus concession rights for the ability to have a club in the national league play in the city.

The Pioneers hosted the league's inaugural match on June 7, 1987, in Aylmer, Quebec against the Hamilton Steelers in a 1–1 draw, in a steady drizzle, in front 2,500 spectators. That season they finished with a 7–9–4 record, placing second in the CSL's Eastern Division with 23 points. The Pioneers hosted the 3rd place Toronto Blizzard in the 1987 CSL Eastern Semi-Final and lost a 2–1 decision to the visitors at Aydelu Park.

The Pioneers were managed into bankruptcy in their inaugural season, but the club was re-structured and renamed as the Ottawa Intrepid. They moved into Terry Fox Stadium in Ottawa for the 1988 season, which seated approximately 2000 spectators. In 1988, the Intrepid finished the season with an 8–11–9 record, finishing 4th in the CSL Eastern Division, failing to qualify for the playoffs.

For the 1989 season, the club brought in national team player Paul James as the club's player-coach signed US national team forward Ted Eck who led the league in scoring with 21 goals. The club finished with a 7–11–8 record, once again finishing fourth in the Eastern Division and missing the playoffs.

In 1990, Drew Ferguson and Ted Morawski became the team's coaches. The club finished with a 2–15–9 record, finishing in sixth. The club ceased operations following the season, marking the end of professional soccer in the city until 2014 when Ottawa Fury FC was founded.

== Notable players ==
- (Scotland) John Bain
- (Canada) Iain Baird
- (Jamaica) Lloyd Barker
- (Canada) Patrick Diotte
- (United States) Ted Eck
- (Canada) Don Ferguson
- (Canada) Drew Ferguson
- (Canada) Peter Gilfillan
- (Canada) Gerry Gray
- (Canada) Lyndon Hooper
- (Canada) Paul James
- (United States) Joey Kirk
- (Canada) John Limniatis
- (Scotland) Peter Mackie
- (Scotland) Mike McAnenay
- (Canada) David McGill
- (Canada) Ed McNally
- (Canada) Tom Panhuyzen
- (Poland) Mirosław Piękoś
- (United States) Tom Soehn
- (Canada) Mark Watson

== Seasons ==
as National Capital Pioneers

Season	League	Record	Rank	Playoffs	Ref
1987	Canadian Soccer League	7–9–4	2nd, East	Quarter-Finals	

as Ottawa Intrepid

Season	League	Record	Rank	Playoffs	Ref
1988	Canadian Soccer League	8–9–11	4th, East	Did not qualify	
1989	Canadian Soccer League	7–8–11	4th, East	Did not qualify	
1990	Canadian Soccer League	2–9–15	6th, East	Did not qualify	
