= Amadeo Gasparini =

Argentine footballer

Personal information
- Full name: Amadeo Raul Gasparini
- Date of birth: January 24, 1962 (age 64)
- Place of birth: Argentina
- Position: Midfielder

Senior career*
Years	Team	Apps	(Gls)
1977–1980	Talleres de Córdoba		
1980–1984	Málaga CF		
1984–1985	Platense	18	(4)
1985–1986	Chacarita Juniors		
1986–1987	Independiente de La Rioja		
1988	North York Rockets	8	(3)
1988–1989	Hamilton Steelers	41	(30)
1989	Talleres de Córdoba		
1991–1993	Club Deportivo Municipal		
1993	Toronto Blizzard	10	(6)
1994–1995	Club Destroyers		
- * Club domestic league appearances and goals

Amadeo Gasparini is a retired Argentine association football midfielder.

In 1988, Gasparini joined the North York Rockets of the Canadian Soccer League. In early July 1988, the Hamilton Steelers acquired Gasparini from the Rockets. His eighteen goals that season placed him third in the league and earned him a berth on the All Star team. Gasparini remained with the Steelers in 1989. In the spring of 1993, Gasparini returned to Canada where he played several months with the Toronto Blizzard in the American Professional Soccer League.
