= Colin Miller (soccer, born 1964) =

Canadian soccer player and coach

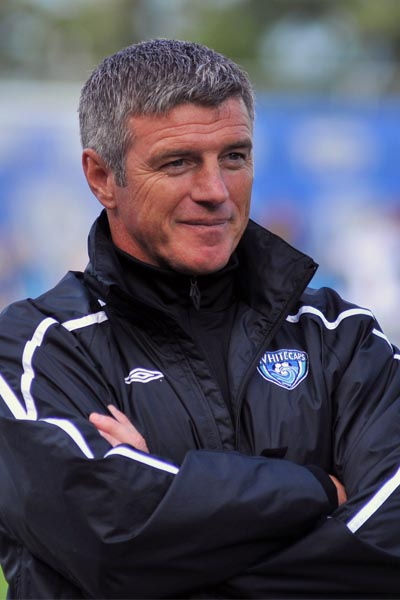
- Miller in 2010

Personal information
- Full name: Colin Fyfe Miller
- Date of birth: 4 October 1964 (age 62)
- Place of birth: Hamilton, Scotland
- Height: 1.70 m (5 ft 7 in)
- Position: Defender

Senior career*
Years	Team	Apps	(Gls)
1982–1984	Toronto Blizzard	23	(2)
1984–1986	Rangers	7	(0)
1986–1988	Doncaster Rovers	61	(3)
1988	Hamilton Steelers	27	(2)
1988–1993	Hamilton Academical	198	(5)
1990	→ Hamilton Steelers (loan)	11	(0)
1994	St Johnstone	24	(0)
1995	Heart of Midlothian	19	(1)
1995–1998	Dunfermline	61	(0)
1998	Ayr United	14	(0)
1999–2000	Hamilton Academical	9	(0)
2004–2005	Abbotsford Mariners	9	(0)

International career
1982	Canada U20	5	(0)
1983–1997	Canada	61	(5)

Managerial career
- 1999–2000: Hamilton Academical (player-coach)
- 2000–2002: Canada (assistant coach)
- 2003–2004: Canada (interim coach)
- 2005–2007: Abbotsford Rangers
- 2007: Derby County (assistant first-team coach)
- 2008–2009: Victoria Highlanders
- 2009: Fraser Valley Cascades Women's
- 2009: Vancouver Whitecaps Residency (assistant coach)
- 2010: Vancouver Whitecaps Residency
- 2010–2011: Vancouver Whitecaps FC (assistant coach)
- 2012: Fraser Valley Cascades Men's (assistant coach)
- 2012–2017: FC Edmonton
- 2013: Canada (interim coach)
Medal record
Representing Canada
Men's Association football
North American Nations Cup
Winner	1990 Canada
- * Club domestic league appearances and goals

Colin Fyfe Miller (born 4 October 1964) is a Canadian professional soccer coach who captained the Canadian national team several times while earning 61 caps (scoring 5 goals) in total.

== Club career ==
Moving to Vancouver at the age of 10, Miller began his professional playing career as a 17-year-old, joining the Toronto Blizzard of the NASL in 1982. After playing 23 games over three seasons with the Blizzard, Miller joined Scottish giants Rangers, where he spent the 1984–85 and 1985–86 seasons, appearing in four first-team games.

Miller played in 61 games and scored three goals for Football League side Doncaster Rovers in 1986–87 and 1987–88, for Scottish Football League club Hamilton Academical 199 times over six seasons (1989–94), St Johnstone in 12 games in 1994, Heart of Midlothian 16 games in 1994–95, Dunfermline 62 times over three seasons (1995–98), Ayr United six times in 1998, and eight times as a player-coach of Academical in 1998–99. Miller also played two summer seasons for the Hamilton Steelers in the Canadian Soccer League, playing 27 times in 1988 and 11 times in 1990.

== International career ==
Miller made his national team debut against Scotland on 19 June 1983 and was a squad member for Canada's first World Cup finals appearance in 1986 although he did not play. He has represented Canada in 26 FIFA World Cup qualification matches. His final international was a November 1997 World Cup qualification match against Costa Rica, a game in which seven other national team veterans finished their international career.

== Coaching career ==
In the early 2000s, he was named Canada's assistant coach. In 2003–2004, he served as temporary coach. Miller was a youth soccer coach with the Abbotsford Soccer Association in the Fraser Valley in British Columbia, specifically the Abbotsford Rangers USL Premier Development League side, until 2007.

On 3 July 2007, it was announced that Colin Miller was hired as assistant first-team coach of Derby County, an English club playing the 2007–08 season in the Premier League.

On 2 April 2008, Miller was introduced as the coach and Director of Soccer Operations for the Victoria Highlanders FC of the USL Premier Development League.

On 25 March 2010, with the resignation of German coach Thomas Niendorf, Miller was named as the new coach of the Vancouver Whitecaps Residency. Miller served as assistant coach of Vancouver Whitecaps FC during the club's 2011 inaugural season in Major League Soccer. Vancouver released Miller from his coaching contract on 26 October 2011, due to the newly appointed head coach Martin Rennie's desire to bring in his own staff.

On 27 November 2012, FC Edmonton announced Colin Miller as its new head coach.

In January 2013, Miller was confirmed interim head coach of Canada for a second time following the departure of Stephen Hart. On 14 March 2013, it was announced that Tony Fonseca, technical director for the Canadian Soccer Association, as coach of the Canadian national team for the friendly matches in March 2013, although Miller returned as interim head coach for a match in Edmonton on 28 May. The CSA announced in mid-June that Miller would continue as interim head coach for Canada during the 2013 CONCACAF Gold Cup.

On 4 December 2017, FC Edmonton parted ways with Miller after five seasons following the dissolution of the North American Soccer League.

== Personal life ==
Colin Miller is married to his high school sweet heart Maria Miller.

== Playing statistics ==
Appearances and goals by national team and year
National team	Year	Apps	Goals
Canada	1983	2	0
Canada	1984	3	1
Canada	1985	0	0
Canada	1986	2	0
Canada	1987	0	0
Canada	1988	1	0
Canada	1989	2	0
Canada	1990	1	0
Canada	1991	3	1
Canada	1992	10	2
Canada	1993	11	1
Canada	1994	5	0
Canada	1995	5	0
Canada	1996	8	0
Canada	1997	8	0
Total		61	5

Scores and results list Canada's goal tally first, score column indicates score after each Miller goal.

List of international goals scored by Colin Miller
No.	Date	Venue	Opponent	Score	Result	Competition
1	24 October 1984	Prince Moulay Abdellah Stadium, Rabat, Morocco	Morocco	2–1	2–3	Friendly
2	3 July 1991	Los Angeles Memorial Coliseum, Los Angeles, United States	Jamaica	2–1	3–2	1991 Gold Cup
3	25 October 1992	Estadio Cuscatlán, San Salvador, El Salvador	El Salvador	1–1	1–1	1994 World Cup qualifier
4	8 November 1992	Swangard Stadium, Burnaby, Canada	El Salvador	1–0	2–3	1994 World Cup qualifier
5	24 March 1993	Estadio Nacional de Costa Rica, San José, Costa Rica	Costa Rica	1–0	1–0	Friendly

== Managerial statistics ==
As of 18 June 2015

Team	From	To	Record							
Team	From	To	G	W	L	T	GF	GA	GD	Win %
Hamilton Academical	1 July 1998	20 August 1999	46	8	26	12	39	83	−44	17.39
Canada	2 September 2003	31 December 2003	3	0	0	3	3	11	−8	0.00
Abbotsford Rangers	2005	2007	49	17	24	8	92	88	+4	34.69
Victoria Highlanders	3 April 2008	26 July 2009	16	6	6	4	37	25	+12	37.50
FC Edmonton	27 November 2012	24 November 2017	74	22	28	24	93	93	+0	29.73
Canada	7 January 2013	14 March 2013	2	0	1	1	0	4	−4	0.00
Canada	16 May 2013	14 July 2013	4	0	3	1	0	4	−4	0.00
Total			194	53	88	53	264	308	−44	27.32

== Honours ==
Canada

- North American Nations Cup: 1990
