= Tony Waiters =

English footballer (1937–2020)

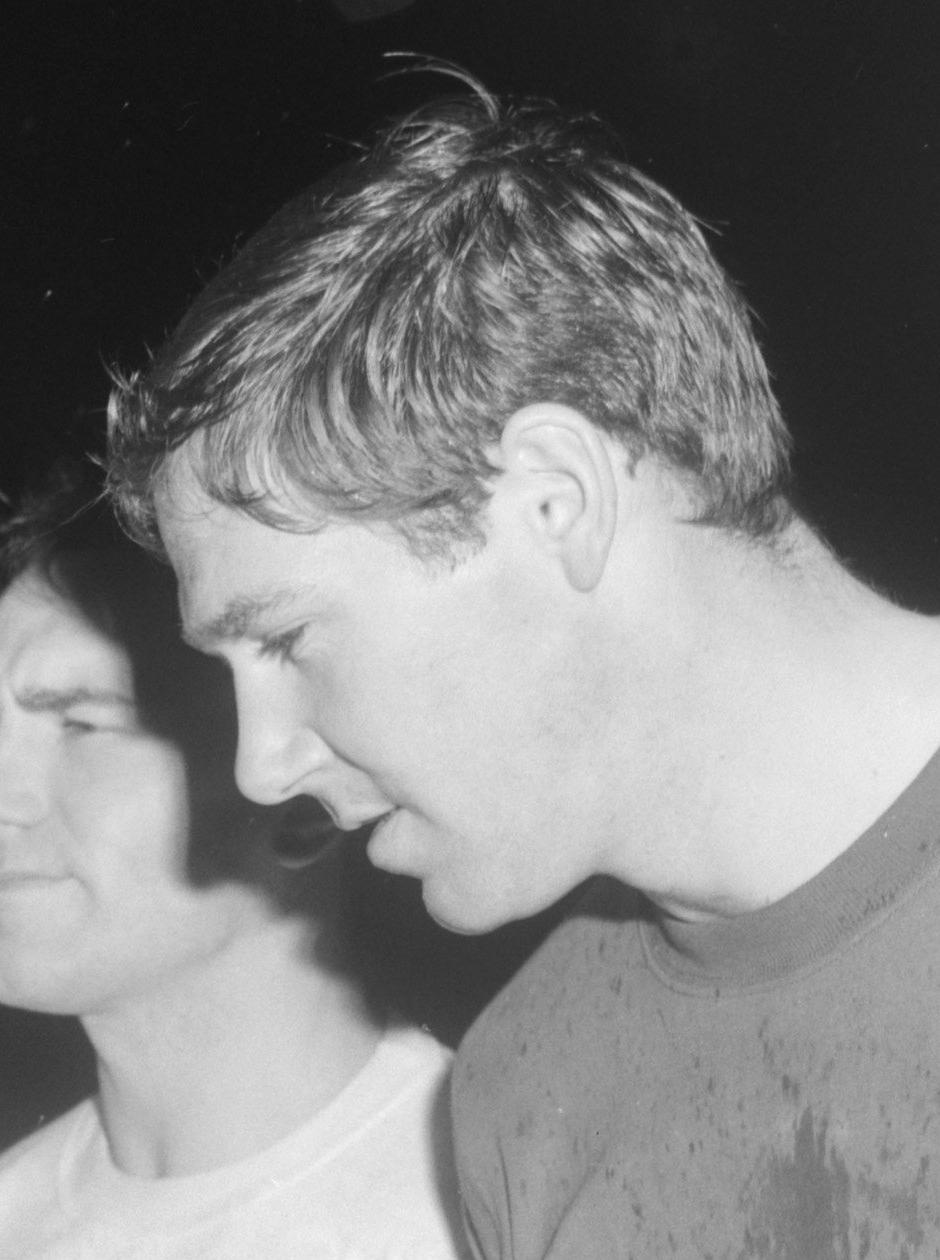
- Waiters in December 1964

Personal information
- Full name: Anthony Keith Waiters
- Date of birth: 1 February 1937
- Place of birth: Southport, England
- Date of death: 5 November 2020 (aged 83)
- Position: Goalkeeper

Senior career*
Years	Team	Apps	(Gls)
1957–1958	Bishop Auckland		
1958–1959	Macclesfield Town	11	(0)
1959–1967	Blackpool	257	(0)
1970–1972	Burnley	38	(0)
Total		306	(0)

International career
1964	England	5	(0)

Managerial career
- 1972–1977: Plymouth Argyle
- 1977–1979: Vancouver Whitecaps
- 1981–1986: Canada
- 1990–1991: Canada
Medal record
Representing Canada(as manager)
Men's Association football
CONCACAF Championship
Winner	1985 North America
North American Nations Cup
Winner	1990 Canada
Third place	1991 United States
- * Club domestic league appearances and goals

Anthony Keith Waiters (1 February 1937 – 5 November 2020) was an English footballer who played as a goalkeeper. He is better known for his coaching career in Canada. He managed the Vancouver Whitecaps to an NASL championship, and was in charge of the Canada national team, when they qualified for the 1986 World Cup, which is their first appearance in the tournament.

== Playing career ==
Waiters began his career as an amateur with Northern League club Bishop Auckland, moving to Macclesfield Town in 1958. He was capped as an England Amateur in May 1959 while at Loughborough College. He played centre-half in schoolboy football and took up goalkeeping when serving in the RAF.

The same year, he was spotted by Blackpool manager Ron Suart and signed to replace the aging George Farm. Turning professional, he appeared over 250 times for Blackpool. He won five England caps in 1964, as Alf Ramsey sought a backup for Gordon Banks with the 1966 World Cup imminent. Although selected in Ramsey's initial squad of 40, ultimately, however, Waiters was not chosen for the final 22. Waiters retired in 1967, as Blackpool were relegated from the First Division. Taking up coaching, he worked for the Football Association as a Regional Coach, and for Liverpool's youth development program before moving to Burnley. In 1970, an injury to Burnley's goalkeeper Peter Mellor led to Waiters' coming out of retirement. After making another 40 appearances, he finally retired in 1972.

== Managerial career ==
Waiters began coaching with the England national youth side and led them to a European Championship held in Italy (1973). He took over at Plymouth Argyle and led them to 2nd in the third division and promotion in 1975. He took over the Whitecaps midway through the 1977 season and in 1979 led them to an upset of the New York Cosmos en route to victory in Soccer Bowl '79, the NASL championship. He was promoted to general manager in 1980 and remained in this role until 1982.

At the helm of Canada, Waiters saw the side reach the quarterfinals of the 1984 Olympics. In 1985, his team won the CONCACAF Championship, qualifying them to the next year's World Cup. At the 1986 World Cup, Canada held France scoreless until late in a 1–0 loss. The team went on to lose their two remaining games and go scoreless for the finals. Waiters managed the team again briefly in 1990.

== Coaching and advisory roles ==
Waiters wrote books on soccer skills and coaching. He was inducted into the Canadian Soccer Hall of Fame as a builder in 2001, and into the British Columbia Sports Hall of Fame in 2019.

Waiters created his company - World of Soccer - in the 1980s, producing a complete series of coaching books, soccer equipment, such as WOS markers, as well as his infamous Ace Coaching cards. Since 2000 he took World of Soccer to a new level, developing Total Player Development, which in turn was the base for Byte Size Coaching, a simple yet comprehensive website for soccer parents, coaches and volunteers. Byte Size Coaching is now used by over 350 clubs ranging from Canada, America, UK, Australia and Singapore. Byte Size Coaching was created to help community clubs and soccer associations reach all their coaches.

Waiters continued to coach children and young adults, helping them pursue their soccer goals and moulding players for the future. He was appointed the first Director of the National Soccer Coaches Association of America's (NSCAA) Goalkeeping Institute, stepping down in 2006. He remained a National Staff Coach of the NSCAA and U.S. Soccer.

== Death ==
Waiters died at age 83 on November 5, 2020, in North Vancouver, BC, of complications from pneumonia. It was several days before the word of his death became public so in some outlets the date of his death was erroneously reported as being November 10.

== Honours ==
=== As Manager ===
Canada

- CONCACAF Championship: 1985
- North American Nations Cup: 1990; 3rd place, 1991

=== Individual ===
- Aubrey Sanford Meritorious Service Award: 1996
