= Don Ferguson (soccer) =

Canadian retired soccer player

Personal information
- Date of birth: January 2, 1963 (age 63)
- Place of birth: Toronto, Ontario, Canada
- Position: Goalkeeper

Senior career*
Years	Team	Apps	(Gls)
- Toronto Italia
	Luton Town	0	(0)
1986	Wrexham	20	(0)
1987–1988	Ottawa Pioneers/Intrepid	45	(0)
1989	Hamilton Steelers	0	(0)
1989–1990	North York Rockets	13	(0)

International career
1983	Canada Olympic	4	(0)
1984	Canada Olympic B	1	(0)
1986–1989	Canada	3	(0)
- * Club domestic league appearances and goals

Don Ferguson (born January 2, 1963) is a Canadian soccer coach and former professional player.

== Club career ==
At age 17, he began playing professionally in Portugal in their national soccer league.

He then moved to England, where he joined first division club Luton Town. After leaving Luton he joined Welsh club Wrexham in the English fourth division, playing under non-contract terms in the 1985–86 season, making 20 appearances.

He also played professionally in Canada in the Canadian Professional Soccer League with Toronto Italia, Ottawa Pioneers/Intrepid, the North York Rockets, and Hamilton Steelers.

== International career ==
Ferguson played for the Canadian Olympic team in 1983 helping them to qualify for the 1984 Olympics, although he did not play in the Olympics.

He also played for the Canadian national team, making three appearances.

== Coaching career ==
After his playing career, Ferguson served as a youth soccer coach for a variety of youth soccer clubs in Ontario - Brampton SC, Guelph SC, Bolton SC, Georgetown SC, Mississauga Falcons SC, Markham SC, Dixie SC, Toronto FC Academy, and Bryst Soccer Academy, as well as an Ontario Soccer Association Provincial Coach from 2007 to 2009 and a Durham Soccer Association Coach from 2010 to 2011. In 2005, he joined Aurora YSC as a youth soccer coach and joined their League1 Ontario competitive team, when launched in 2016.

Since 2011, he has served as the Goalkeeping coach for the University of Guelph men's and women's Gryphons soccer teams. With the Gryphons, he won an OUA championship and the 2016 bronze medal at the U SPORTS Championships with the Gryphon's men's program, and the 2017 OUA gold medal with the women's team.

For 2020, he became an assistant coach for North Mississauga in League1 Ontario.

In 2021, he joined expansion League1 Ontario club Guelph United serving as an assistant and goaltending coach. In 2024, he was named the League2 Ontario Southwest Division Coach of the Year as the head coach of Guelph United B.

He also serves as a coach for the Canadian para soccer team.
