= Frank Yallop =

Soccer player and coach (born 1964)

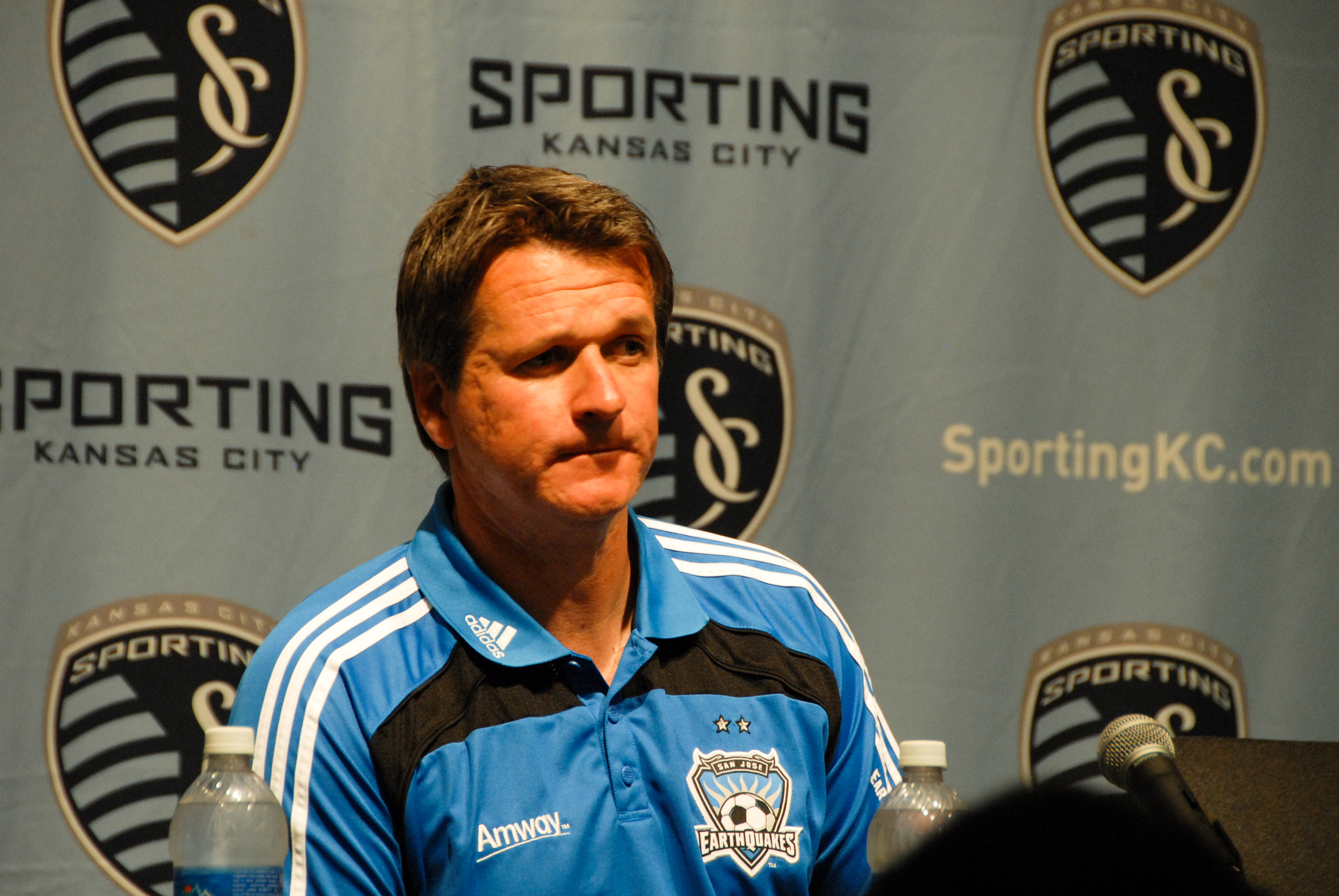
- Yallop with San Jose Earthquakes in 2011

Personal information
- Full name: Frank Walter Yallop
- Date of birth: 4 April 1964 (age 62)
- Place of birth: Watford, Hertfordshire, England
- Height: 5 ft 11 in (1.80 m)
- Position: Defender

Youth career
- 1982–1983: Ipswich Town

Senior career*
Years	Team	Apps	(Gls)
1983–1996	Ipswich Town	389	(9)
1995	→ Blackpool (loan)	3	(0)
1996–1998	Tampa Bay Mutiny	88	(1)
Total		480	(10)

International career
1981–1982	England Youth	5	(0)
1990–1997	Canada	52	(0)

Managerial career
- 2001–2003: San Jose Earthquakes
- 2004–2006: Canada
- 2006–2007: Los Angeles Galaxy
- 2008–2013: San Jose Earthquakes
- 2013–2015: Chicago Fire
- 2016–2017: Phoenix Rising
- 2020: Las Vegas Lights (interim)
- 2021–2024: Monterey Bay
- 2026–: McKinney Chupacabras
Medal record
Representing Canada
Men's Association football
North American Nations Cup
Winner	1990 Canada
- * Club domestic league appearances and goals

Frank Walter Yallop (born 4 April 1964) is a professional soccer coach and former player. He is currently head coach of McKinney Chupacabras FC in USL League Two. Born in England, he played for the Canada national team.

He played 13 years in England for Ipswich Town, including the club's first three seasons in the Premier League. He also played in Major League Soccer (MLS) for the Tampa Bay Mutiny, and earned 52 caps for the Canada national team.

He spent a further 13 years as coach in MLS for San Jose Earthquakes, LA Galaxy, and Chicago Fire, as well as three years coaching the Canada national team. After his time in MLS he served in coaching and management positions in various clubs in the USL Championship, working with Phoenix Rising, Fresno FC, Las Vegas Lights, and Monterey Bay FC.

== Early life ==
Yallop was born in Watford and spent his early childhood there before his father, a meat cutter by trade, joined a brother in Canada in 1974 bringing his wife and three children to Vancouver. Yallop continued playing in British Columbia, where he caught the eye of an Ipswich Town scout who invited Yallop to try out for Ipswich aged 14.

== Club career ==
=== Ipswich Town (1983–1996) ===
In 1983, aged 19, Yallop signed a professional contract with Ipswich Town. He would make his debut the following year, in a 1-0 defeat away to Everton. He was part of the Ipswich squad that was relegated from the First Division in 1986 and of the squad that won the 1991–92 Second Division title promotion six years later to the inaugural season of the newly formed FA Premier League, where Ipswich stayed for three years before being relegated once again to the second tier. Yallop was named the club's Player of the Year in 1987–88. In August 1992, Ipswich held a testimonial match against West Ham United in honour of Yallop. In the later years of his Ipswich career, he played alongside fellow Canadian Craig Forrest. In the season following the relegation, Yallop was loaned out to third-tier side Blackpool F.C. in November 1995, where he featured for the team in a few Second Division matches. He departed the club following the conclusion of the 1995–96 season.

Two of his eight goals for the Town came in the span of three days in February 1993. The first came against Tottenham Hotspur with Yallop breaking a four-year scoring drought in a 2–0 victory. The second goal helped to push Ipswich to beat Premier League title favourites Manchester United 2–1 at Portman Road, a result which saw Ipswich occupy fourth place in the league and spark hopes of a late run to the title, but instead a slump in form followed and Ipswich finished 16th.

At the end of his time at Ipswich, Yallop amassed 385 appearances in all competitions, which puts him just outside the top ten in appearances for the club all time. Yallop was inducted into the club's Hall of Fame in 2023, a recognition of his nearly 15 years spent with the club between academy and professional play. Yallop had collected his award in December 2022, as the March match of honor fell within the USL Championship season.

=== Tampa Bay Mutiny (1996–1998) ===
After a lengthy career in England, Yallop returned to North America in 1996, when he signed with Major League Soccer and was drafted 57th overall by the Tampa Bay Mutiny in the MLS Inaugural Player Draft. Week 23 of the season saw Frank Yallop win his first and only MLS Player of the Week award. This award was also the first for any Tampa Bay player. Tampa Bay would finish the inaugural MLS season with the best record, for which they'd retroactively be awarded the Supporter's Shield. However, in the playoffs Tampa would fall just short of reaching the first ever MLS Cup, losing in the Eastern Conference finals to eventual champions D.C. United.

Yallop was given his only MLS All-Star honor with an appearance in the 1997 game, representing Tampa Bay on the Eastern Conference team. The 1997 MLS season saw Tampa slightly regress, finishing with the third best record overall, and second best in the East behind D.C. United. Tampa would make the playoffs for the second season in a row but would fall in the first round to the Columbus Crew. The 1998 season saw yet another regression, with Tampa Bay failing to quality for the playoffs. In the final match of his MLS career, Frank Yallop scored the game winner, which was his first goal of his MLS career.

After three seasons with the Mutiny, in which he served as captain and started nearly every game, Yallop retired from professional soccer. He was released from the Mutiny roster due to MLS shrinking their foreign player limit from 5 to 4 players per team. At the time of his retirement, Yallop was second on the team all-time in games played (88), games started (84), and minutes played (7,646).

During the 1999 season the team lost Jan Eriksson and R.T. Moore to injury and retirement respectively. The Mutiny petitioned the league to sign Yallop, who was still participating in player drills and could resume his career, but the league denied the request and Yallop remained retired.

== International career ==
Yallop made five appearances for England's youth team in 1981–82 before switching allegiance to Canada.

He had initially been ineligible to feature for Canada and thus missed out on their first World Cup participation in 1986. After FIFA's rules changed regarding national team player eligibility, Yallop was finally able to make his official debut and start for Canada at 26 years of age on 13 May 1990, against Mexico in the 1990 North American Championship, helping Canada win the tournament. Yallop had featured in Canada's first match of the tournament against the United States, however since the US sent a B-squad to the match, it did not count as a full international.

Over his Canada career he earned 52 caps, serving as captain multiple times, and scoring no goals at the international level. He represented Canada in 27 FIFA World Cup qualification matches across the 1994 and 1998 World Cup qualifying campaigns. His final international was on 16 November 1997 away to Costa Rica in Canada's final 1998 World Cup qualification match.

On 29 April 2005, Yallop was selected for induction into the Canadian Soccer Hall of Fame for his playing career. On 24 May 2012, Yallop was selected by the Canadian Soccer Hall of Fame as the right back of Canada's Best XI for the 1963–2012 era.

== Coaching career ==
=== Early coaching career ===
After retiring following his 1998 season with the Tampa Bay Mutiny, Yallop was offered the opportunity to become an assistant coach for the club starting with the 1999 MLS season. In the interim period before the pre-season would begin, Yallop began his coaching career in 1998 as an assistant-coach under Lothar Osiander with the U.S. Project-40 team, joining the team on a 5-game tour of England. Osiander joked that he brought Yallop on board because "I needed someone who knew how to drive on the other side of the road." Following the tour, he began his duties as an assistant coach for the Tampa Bay Mutiny. In 2000, he became chief assistant coach for D.C. United under Thomas Rongen. In December 2000, it had been reported that Yallop was considered as an early candidate to coach for his former team Tampa Bay Mutiny, but he did not make the final group of candidates.

=== San Jose Earthquakes (2001–2003) ===
In 2001, Yallop was named head coach for the San Jose Earthquakes, just three days before the MLS SuperDraft. He replaced Lothar Osiander, who he had briefly coached under just few years prior with Project-40. Yallop was the first former MLS player to become an MLS head coach after retiring. During the pre-season, Yallop acquired Jeff Agoos, Landon Donovan, Dwayne DeRosario, Manny Lagos, Ramiro Corrales and Ronnie Ekelund, as well as assistant coach Dominic Kinnear. Kinnear, a former teammate of Yallop's at Tampa Bay Mutiny, initially thought he was being recruited as a player, but Yallop asked him to join the club as an assistant coach. Kinnear would end his playing career to join Yallop's coaching staff. In his first year as head coach, Yallop proceeded to lead the San Jose Earthquakes to the playoffs for their second time in franchise history, the first time since the club's and league's inaugural season in 1996. The 2001 playoff run culminated with the club's first MLS Cup appearance, which ended with a win over California Clásico rivals LA Galaxy. At the season's conclusion, Yallop was named 2001 MLS Coach of the Year.

The following year the Quakes would improve their regular season performance and finish in second place overall. They set or tied records for an MLS all-time best home record (12–1–1), a then MLS record 12-game winning streak at home, and went on a 15-game home unbeaten streak that tied their previous club best from 1999 to 2000. However, San Jose would succumb to an upset in the first round of the 2002 MLS Playoffs against the Columbus Crew, ending their defense of the MLS Cup. The season was also notable for Yallop as he coached in the 2002 MLS All-Star Game in only his second season as head coach, leading the MLS All-Stars to a 3–2 victory over the US men's national team.

In 2003, the Earthquakes yet again improved upon their regular season form and finished as the best team in the West, and just two points shy of winning the Supporters Shield as the best regular season team. Yallop would lead the team to their second MLS title through these playoffs, their second title in the span of three seasons. Beside the MLS Cup final, this Earthquakes playoff run is most known for the club completing the greatest comeback in MLS playoff history, a 5–4 aggregate win after being down 4–0 on aggregate heading into the second half of the return leg of the home and away series. MLS Cup 2003 is the Earthquakes' most recent appearance in the playoff final as well as the last time they won the MLS Cup.

=== Canada (2004–2006) ===
On 16 December 2003 it was announced that Yallop would become head coach of the Canada National Team starting on 1 January of the following year. Yallop oversaw Canada's appearances at the 2003 and 2005 editions of the CONCACAF Gold Cup, both of which featured group stage exits, as well as their qualification campaign for the 2006 FIFA World Cup which ended in the third round of CONCACAF qualifying out of four total rounds. On 7 June 2006, Yallop resigned as coach of the Canada national team, as he was announced as the new head coach of Los Angeles Galaxy. He finished with an 8-9-3 record as Canada's head coach. Yallop stated in a 2021 interview that his "one regret" was leaving the Earthquakes to coach Canada, "I think I maybe jumped into Canada a little bit too soon and I wasn’t ready for it anyway."

=== Los Angeles Galaxy (2006–2007) ===
Yallop took the helm for the Galaxy midway through the 2006 MLS season, eventually guiding the team to finish just outside the playoffs, missing qualifications by three points. The Galaxy recruited English star David Beckham ahead of the 2007 MLS season, though he would not transfer to the club until July and did not make his first appearance until August due to lingering injuries. The Galaxy ultimately failed to qualify for the playoffs once again in 2007. Yallop has been defended for his part in that, with forward Alan Gordon, who played on the 2007 Galaxy team, stating "it had nothing to do with Frank. We had 11 guys come in and out of there in a couple months. We had no team chemistry. We had a bunch of individuals who were trying to hang on and make the best of it." Despite not making the MLS playoffs in either season, Yallop led the Galaxy to two tournament finals, the 2006 U.S. Open Cup and the 2007 North American SuperLiga, which the Galaxy lost to the Chicago Fire and Pachuca respectively.

=== Return to San Jose Earthquakes (2008–2013) ===
On 4 November 2007 it was revealed that Yallop was being bought out of his contract with the Galaxy to become the head coach of the San Jose Earthquakes once again for the 2008 season, with Dutchman Ruud Gullit taking his place. The Galaxy received the Earthquakes' third-round pick in the 2008 MLS SuperDraft as compensation for Yallop's departure.

Ahead of the 2006 MLS season, the Earthquakes were relocated to Texas to become the Houston Dynamo. Soon after the move, plans were established to revive the San Jose Earthquakes franchise, this time as an expansion team who would need to build their roster from scratch. Two weeks after it was announced Yallop would be taking over as Earthquakes head coach, the team participated in the 2007 MLS expansion draft to build out the team's roster, most notably selecting Jason Hernandez who would appear in 165 regular season matches with the club from 2008–2014. Throughout the off-season Yallop would bring some players from his first Earthquakes stint back to San Jose including Joe Cannon, Ramiro Corrales, Arturo Álvarez, and Kelly Gray. Starting off the season in poor form, the Quakes would pick up momentum in the second half with a 9 match unbeaten run. This run of form would not be enough, as they would ultimately finish last in the overall MLS standings at the conclusion of their first season, though they were tied on points with Yallop's former team and San Jose's rivals, the LA Galaxy.

The following season would see the club barely best their 2008 finish, as the Earthquakes ended second from last in the 2009 MLS season. The newly reborn club would see an upswing in their third season since their return. The Earthquakes would finish the regular season 8th place overall, earning their first playoff appearance in their current incarnation. The league performance was spearheaded by Chris Wondolowski who scored 18 goals en route to becoming MLS Golden Boot winner after only becoming an MLS starter late into the 2009 campaign. Yallop would lead the club to a shocking upset of the top team in the Eastern Conference, the New York Red Bulls, keeping New York's newly acquired Thierry Henry off the scoresheet in a 3–2 aggregate victory after a 1–0 home loss in San Jose. The Earthquakes would fall in the Eastern Conference final, a 1–0 loss to eventual MLS Cup champion Colorado Rapids. The following season would see the Earthquakes return to a near bottom of the table form, 14th out of 18 MLS clubs overall. Despite the poor form, the season and various transfers within would help to bring the team to new heights the following year. The Quakes would begin the 2012 MLS season with their best start in franchise history, securing 12 points in their first 5 matches. The good form would last throughout the regular season, propelling the team to finish with club records 66 points won and 72 goals scored. San Jose won the Supporters Shield the first trophy since their return in 2008 and second Shield overall. This shield was the first of Yallop's coaching career. The club would make their second playoff appearance in two years, but could not get past the rival LA Galaxy in the Western Conference semi-finals. Yallop would win his second ever MLS Coach of the Year award, 11 years after he won the award in his first season as a professional head coach. The Earthquakes 2013 season under Yallop would quickly turn from a good start to poor form, with two wins in their first three matches but only one more for the remaining nine, for a record of 3-6-6. Yallop and the club would mutually agree to part ways with the club on 7 June 2013, with assistant coach Mark Watson taking over the interim head coach role.

Yallop led the new-era Earthquakes for five and a half seasons before mutually parting ways in June 2013. He compiled a 62–6–51 record and led the club to two postseason appearances (2010, 2012) and the 2012 Supporters' Shield. The 2012 Shield victory is the most recent trophy the Earthquakes have won. His combined 126 wins in two stints at the club is the most in team history. He would be inducted into the club's Hall of Fame in 2022, in recognition for his impact on the club, being the coach that brought them their only two MLS Cups, and three of their four trophies overall.

=== Chicago Fire (2013–2015) ===
In October 2013, Yallop was named Chicago Fire's new head coach and director of soccer, replacing departing coach Frank Klopas and general manager Javier Leon in their respective roles. This was the first time that Yallop would not have to report to a general manager or a sporting director, having done so for his entire coaching career to this point. Yallop notably kept his connections to Tottenham Hotspur from his stint with the San Jose Earthquakes, bringing in Grant Ward on loan for the 2014 season and later facing the English club in a mid-season friendly.

Chicago would finish second to last in the Eastern Conference in his first season in charge, setting an MLS record for most draws in a season with 18. The club made a run to the semifinals of the 2014 U.S. Open Cup, where they were knocked out in a club record 6–0 defeat to eventual champions Seattle Sounders. The 2015 season saw the team perform even worse in the league, and the poor form would see Yallop fired on 20 September 2015, with five matches left in the season. Chicago would finish the season worst in the East and the worst record in MLS overall. He compiled a 13–26–24 record with the Fire in his stint with the club, in what would be his last MLS coaching job to date.

=== Arizona United SC and Phoenix Rising FC (2016–2017) ===
Yallop was signed to a three-year contract as head coach and president of soccer operations of Arizona United SC on 23 December 2015. This was his first time managing a club in the USL, a professional league then at the third division in the United States soccer league system. The team was renamed Phoenix Rising FC on 28 November 2016. After only four league matches played in the 2017 season, Yallop would resign from his positions on 24 April to rejoin his family in Northern California. Yallop would stay on to consult in the club's search for a replacement head coach. Frank's assistant Rick Schantz took over as interim coach before the eventual hiring of Patrice Carteron. Phoenix would finish the season in 5th place, good for their first ever playoff appearance.

=== Fresno FC (2018–2019) ===
Yallop was announced on 26 July 2017 as General Manager of the newly established Fresno FC, an expansion team for the 2018 USL season. The team finished their inaugural season in 12th place out of 17 in the Western Conference, four places outside of a playoff spot. The next season would see Fresno vastly improve in quality on the field, finishing in 3rd place out of 18 teams in the West, good for their first ever playoff appearance. Fresno's playoff run ended as soon as it began, losing in an upset at home against expansion side El Paso Locomotive who had finished in 6th place. Fresno FC would fold following the end of the 2019 USL Championship season, citing an inability to find a suitable location for the club to play at long term.

=== Las Vegas Lights FC (2020) ===
On 29 June 2020, Yallop returned to coaching for the first time since 2017 when he was hired in a caretaker role to replace Eric Wynalda as head coach of Las Vegas Lights FC, a month before the 2020 USL Championship season was set to resume. Yallop had made it official at the time of his hire that he would not pursue the head coaching role after the end of the season. Wynalda had coached Las Vegas for a single match of the 2020 USL season before a pause was brought on due to the COVID-19 pandemic. Las Vegas would finish the season fifth place out of five teams in their regional group, and fifteenth of eighteen teams in the Western Conference.

=== Monterey Bay FC (2021–2024) ===
On 1 February 2021 it was announced that Monterey Bay FC would be joining the USL Championship as an expansion side. This club was primarily owned by Ray Beshoff, and its creation was the result of Fresno FC folding two years prior. Yallop was initially announced as sporting director, a similar role to what he had held previously with Fresno. Yallop would be announced in April as taking on the additional role of head coach for Monterey Bay FC while acting as sporting director. Former Earthquakes captain Ramiro Corrales would serve as Yallop's sole assistant coach. Corrales played under Yallop during both of the coach's stints with the San Jose Earthquakes. Monterey Bay FC began their first USL Championship season in March 2022. The club started off the first seven league matches of the season on the road while Cardinale Stadium finished construction. The club achieved their first professional win on 29 March, in their third match of the 2022 USL Championship season. They would not get their second win until the eighth match of the season, which was their home opener. It took until the summer for there to be a true change of form, with strong showings in July and September, but the club would ultimately miss the playoffs in their first season.

In preparation for their second season, Monterey Bay brought back 17 players from their inaugural squad. Yallop coached the club to their first ever win in the U.S. Open Cup on 5 April 2023, away to Central Valley Fuego FC. This was the first time Yallop and Monterey Bay played against a club based in Fresno after Fresno FC folded to eventually become Monterey Bay FC itself. Moving onto the Third Round Monterey Bay would play host to another club from Yallop's past, the San Jose Earthquakes. Monterey Bay would go on to achieve their most important win in club history, upsetting the Quakes 1–0. It was their first competitive match against a first division club in their history. Yallop would remark after the match "I’ve got a lot of connections obviously with the Earthquakes and love them dearly, but it was fun to have this game. The Quakes brought a bunch of fans down, which is fantastic, and obviously our home fans really enjoyed the match…I think it was a great game of football." In May the club would once again host MLS competition in the US Open Cup, but this time they fell in a penalty-shootout against Los Angeles FC. Despite a hot start to the season, Monterey Bay would ultimately finish the season in 11th place, once again 2nd to last in the Western Conference and six points away from qualifying for the playoffs.

Much like the previous season, Monterey Bay retained a large amount of their squad heading into the 2024 season. Yallop had higher expectations for this season, saying “It’s usually year three when you start to see the fruits of your labor, we want to get over that line and be in the playoffs. That’s our goal. So that’s the aim for this club right now.” The club would get off to a best ever start before their form quickly fell off. The team would only win three of their next fourteen matches. Despite an uptick in form in July, Yallop and assistant coach Ramiro Corrales were both released from their positions on 31 July 2024. Simon Dawkins, who had retired as a player with Monterey Bay the day after Yallop departed the club, acted as interim manager for a single match. Yallop would ultimately be replaced in his head coaching role by Jordan Stewart, who he had recruited to play for Phoenix Rising in 2017.

=== McKinney Chupacabras (2026–) ===
Having not coached since he departed Monterey Bay at the end of July 2024, Yallop was announced as head coach of McKinney Chupacabras FC of USL League Two on 17 March 2026, ahead of the club's second ever season. This was his first head coaching role at the amateur level, having previously led clubs in the three professional tiers of the United States soccer league system. McKinney would finish in 3rd place in the Ranger division with 23 points, an improvement on their 5th place finish the previous year, gaining only 10 points in the Mid South division.

== Career Statistics ==
=== International ===
Appearances and goals by national team and year
National team	Year	Apps	Goals
Canada	1990	1	0
Canada	1991	3	0
Canada	1992	9	0
Canada	1993	11	0
Canada	1994	5	0
Canada	1995	6	0
Canada	1996	8	0
Canada	1997	9	0
Total		52	0

=== Managerial ===
As of 31 July 2024

Team	From	To	Record							
Team	From	To	G	W	L	T	GF	GA	GD	Win %
San Jose Earthquakes	3 February 2001	1 January 2004	141	64	45	32	227	166	+61	45.39
Canada	1 January 2004	7 June 2006	20	8	9	3	22	21	+1	40.00
Los Angeles Galaxy	7 June 2006	5 November 2007	62	24	25	13	89	83	+6	38.71
San Jose Earthquakes	5 November 2007	8 June 2013	175	62	62	51	233	232	+1	35.43
Chicago Fire	31 October 2013	20 September 2015	63	13	26	24	77	97	−20	20.63
Arizona United SC / Phoenix Rising FC	23 December 2015	24 April 2017	36	12	17	7	46	53	−7	33.33
Las Vegas Lights FC	29 June 2020	31 December 2020	16	2	9	5	24	34	−10	12.50
Monterey Bay FC	22 April 2021	31 July 2024	95	33	45	17	116	152	−36	34.74
Career totals			608	218	238	152	834	838	−4	35.86

== Honours ==
=== Player ===
Ipswich Town

- Football League Second Division: 1991–92

Tampa Bay Mutiny

- MLS Supporters' Shield: 1996

Canada

- North American Nations Cup: 1990

Individual

- Ipswich Town Player of the Year: 1987–88
- MLS All-Star: 1997
- 2004 MLS Celebration Game: World Legends roster
- Canadian Soccer Hall of Fame: Inducted 2005
- Canadian Soccer Hall of Fame Best XI in 50 Years: 1963-2012
- Ipswich Town Hall of Fame: Inducted 2023

=== Coach ===
San Jose Earthquakes

- MLS Cup: 2001, 2003
- MLS Supporters' Shield: 2012

Individual

- MLS Coach of the Year: 2001, 2012
- San Jose Earthquakes Hall of Fame: Inducted 2022
