= Ian Bridge =

Canadian soccer player (born 1959)

Personal information
- Full name: Ian Christopher Bridge
- Date of birth: 18 September 1959 (age 67)
- Place of birth: Victoria, British Columbia, Canada
- Height: 6 ft 1 in (1.85 m)
- Position: Defender

Senior career*
Years	Team	Apps	(Gls)
1979–1983	Seattle Sounders	100	(11)
1980–81	Seattle Sounders (indoor)	16	(2)
1984	Vancouver Whitecaps	24	(2)
1984–1985	Tacoma Stars	40	(7)
1985–1990	FC La Chaux-de-Fonds		
1990	Victoria Vistas	22	(3)
1991	Kitchener Kickers	11	(0)
1991	North York Rockets	7	(0)

International career
1979	Canada Youth		
1981–1991	Canada	34	(5)

Managerial career
- 1989–1990: FC La Chaux-de-Fonds
- 1990–2000: University of Victoria
- 1997–present: Canada (women) (assistant coach)
- 2001–2008: Canada U20 women (assistant)
- 2008: Canada U20 women
- 2009–2010: Canada U17 women
- 2010: Victoria Highlanders
Medal record
Representing Canada
Men's Association football
CONCACAF Championship
Winner	1985 North America
North American Nations Cup
Winner	1990 Canada
Third place	1991 United States
- * Club domestic league appearances and goals

Ian Christopher Bridge (born 18 September 1959) is a soccer coach and former professional who played as a defender. A former player for the Canada national team, he has coached the Canada women's national team among other teams.

== Club career ==
Bridge was born in Victoria, British Columbia. He began his pro career in 1977 and played in the NASL with the Seattle Sounders from 1979 to 1983 and with the Vancouver Whitecaps in 1984, and MISL indoor soccer with the Tacoma Stars. Over six NASL seasons, he played 124 games and scored 13 goals. Following the demise of the NASL Bridge played for Swiss club FC La Chaux-de-Fonds for two seasons when the club was in the Swiss league first division. Later in the Canadian Soccer League, he played for the Victoria Vistas (1990), Kitchener Kickers (1991), and North York Rockets (1991). Ian played his youth soccer with the Lakehill Soccer Association in Victoria BC, and has an annually awarded Youth Player "Inspirational" trophy named in his honour.

== International career ==
A defender, Bridge made his debut for Canada in an October 1981 friendly match against Trinidad & Tobago and earned 34 caps, scoring 5 goals. He has represented Canada in 12 FIFA World Cup qualification matches and played all three of Canada's games at the 1986 FIFA World Cup finals, the country's first appearance at a World Cup finals. Bridge also played for Canada at the 1984 Olympics and at the 1979 FIFA World Youth Championship. He scored a goal in the first two 1982 FIFA World Cup qualifying games that he played in. His final international was a June 1991 CONCACAF Gold Cup Finals match against Mexico.

Bridge was inducted into the Canadian Soccer Hall of Fame in 2003.

== Managerial career ==
Bridge was head coach of the University of Victoria women's soccer team from 1990 to 2000. He became assistant coach of Canada women's national soccer team in 1997, a position he still has. He became U-19 national women's coach and chief national team assistant coach in March 2001. (The national youth women's team has since become U-20.) Bridge is also team chef of the Canada men's national youth soccer teams. On 10 January 2010, Bridge resigned as head coach of the U-17 Canadian women national team and is now coaching the Victoria Highlanders of the USL (United Soccer league) Premier Development League.

== Career statistics ==
Scores and results list Canada's goal tally first, score column indicates score after each Bridge goal.

List of international goals scored by Ian Bridge
No.	Date	Venue	Opponent	Score	Result	Competition
1	12 November 1981	Estadio Tiburcio Carías Andino, Tegucigalpa, Honduras	Honduras	1–1	1–2	1982 FIFA World Cup qualification
2	15 November 1981	Estadio Tiburcio Carías Andino, Tegucigalpa, Honduras	Mexico	1–1	1–1	1982 FIFA World Cup qualification
3	28 March 1984	Stade Sylvio Cator, Port-au-Prince, Haiti	Haiti	1–0	1–0	Friendly
4	25 May 1988	Varsity Stadium, Toronto, Canada	Chile	1–0	1–0	Matthews Cup
5	15 October 1988	Swangard Stadium, Burnaby, Canada	Guatemala	3–2	3–2	1990 FIFA World Cup qualification

== Honours ==
Canada

- CONCACAF Championship: 1985
- North American Nations Cup: 1990; 3rd place, 1991
