= John Catliff =

Canadian soccer player (born 1965)

Personal information
- Full name: John Terence Catliff
- Date of birth: 8 January 1965 (age 61)
- Place of birth: Vancouver, British Columbia, Canada
- Height: 1.90 m (6 ft 3 in)
- Position: Striker

Youth career
- Kerrisdale

College career
Years	Team	Apps	(Gls)
1983–1986	Harvard Crimson		(34)

Senior career*
Years	Team	Apps	(Gls)
1987	Calgary Kickers	19	(6)
1988–1994	Vancouver 86ers	147	(79)
Total		166	(85)

International career^{‡}
1984–1987	Canada U23	5	(0)
1984–1994	Canada	45	(18)
Medal record
Representing Canada
Men's Association football
North American Nations Cup
Winner	1990 Canada
Third place	1991 United States
- * Club domestic league appearances and goals as of 25 June 2009 ‡ National team caps and goals as of 25 June 2009

John Terence Catliff (born 8 January 1965) is a Canadian former professional soccer player, who played as a striker. He retired ranked second all-time on the Canadian national team with 18 international "A" goals between 1984 and 1994.

In 2012 as part of the Canadian Soccer Association's centennial celebration, he was named to the all-time Canada XI men's team.

== Club career ==
Catliff was selected to the All-Ivy League First team as a forward in 1983, 1984, and 1986 while playing for the Harvard Crimson. He was also named to the All-American First Team in 1986. Catliff ended his college career with the Crimson with a total of 34 goals and 15 assists.

Catliff was a Canadian Soccer League star, scoring the second most goals of anyone in the League's six-year history with 69 goals in total. He was a league season scoring champion in 1988 with 22 goals and in 1990 with 19 goals. He began his CSL career in 1987 playing for the League's inaugural champions, the Calgary Kickers. He then spent the next six seasons with the Vancouver 86ers, who became the CSL champions in four consecutive seasons from 1988 through 1991. Ligament injuries to both knees forced him to retire from professional play in 1994 after two years on the 86ers in the American Professional Soccer League.

== International career ==
Catliff was a member of the quarter-finalist Canadian national team at the 1984 Summer Olympics while still playing at Harvard. He was just 19 years old when he made his international "A" debut for Canada in a July 1984 friendly match against Chile in Edmonton. He made 60 international appearances across 11 years from 1984 to 1994 with Canada Soccer's Men's National Team, including 45 international "A" appearances and 18 international "A" goals.

He represented Canada in 12 FIFA World Cup qualification matches. He suffered a serious knee injury in a 1986 World Cup qualifying match away to Honduras. His replacement, George Pakos, scored the only goal in a crucial 1–0 victory. Recovering from injury, he was not named to Canada's roster for the 1986 World Cup, Canada's only appearance until the 2022 World Cup.

His final international game came in June 1994 in a friendly match against the Netherlands.

=== International "A" goals ===
Scores and results list Canada's goal tally first.

No.	Date	Venue	Opponent	Score	Result	Competition
1	9 June 1985	Gwangju Mudeung Stadium, Gwangju, South Korea	Iraq	1–0	1–6	President's Cup
2	2 October 1987	Estadio Nacional, Tegucigalpa, Honduras	Honduras	1–0	1–1	Friendly match
3	5 April 1988	National Stadium, Kingston, Jamaica	Jamaica	1–0	4–0	Friendly match
4	5 April 1988	National Stadium, Kingston, Jamaica	Jamaica	2–0	4–0	Friendly match
5	5 April 1988	National Stadium, Kingston, Jamaica	Jamaica	3–0	4–0	Friendly match
6	14 April 1988	Swangard Stadium, Burnaby, Canada	Mexico	1–0	1–1	Friendly match
7	2 October 1988	Queen's Park Oval, Port of Spain, Trinidad and Tobago	Trinidad and Tobago	1–1	2–1	Friendly match
8	13 May 1990	Swangard Stadium, Burnaby, Canada	Mexico	1–1	2–1	North American Soccer Championship
9	13 May 1990	Swangard Stadium, Burnaby, Canada	Mexico	2–1	2–1	North American Soccer Championship
10	2 April 1992	Royal Athletic Park, Victoria, Canada	China	1–0	5–2	Friendly match
11	2 April 1992	Royal Athletic Park, Victoria, Canada	China	2–0	5–2	Friendly match
12	20 May 1992	Varsity Stadium, Toronto, Canada	Scotland	1–1	1–3	Friendly match
13	4 March 1993	LeBard Stadium, Costa Mesa, United States	United States	2–1	2–2	Friendly match
14	11 March 1993	Royal Athletic Park, Victoria, Canada	South Korea	1–0	2–0	Friendly match
15	4 April 1993	Estadio Nacional, Tegucigalpa, Honduras	Honduras	1–0	2–2	1994 FIFA World Cup qualification
16	11 April 1993	Swangard Stadium, Burnaby, Canada	El Salvador	2–0	2–0	1994 FIFA World Cup qualification
17	18 April 1993	Swangard Stadium, Burnaby, Canada	Honduras	3–1	3–1	1994 FIFA World Cup qualification
18	2 May 1993	Estadio Cuscatlán, San Salvador, El Salvador	El Salvador	1–0	2–1	1994 FIFA World Cup qualification

=== Additional international goals ===
Scores and results list Canada's goal tally first.

No.	Date	Venue	Opponent	Score	Result	Competition
*	23 June 1984	Provincial Stadium, Guangzhou, Canton, China	Nigeria	1–1	3–1	Great Wall Championship
*	23 June 1984	Provincial Stadium, Guangzhou, Canton, China	Nigeria	3–1	3–1	Great Wall Championship
*	25 June 1984	Workers Stadium, Beijing, China	Congo	2–0	2–0	Great Wall Championship
*	30 June 1984	Tianjin Garden Stadium, Tianjin, China	Poland U-21	1–0	2–5	Great Wall Championship
*	30 June 1984	Tianjin Garden Stadium, Tianjin, China	Poland U-21	2–1	2–5	Great Wall Championship
*	26 March 1988	Lima, Peru	Peru U-19 & Seniors	3–1	3–1	Friendly match
*	8 July 1988	Windsor Stadium, Windsor, ON, CAN	Italy Amateurs	1–0	1–0	Friendly match
*	6 May 1990	Swangard Stadium, Burnaby, Canada	United States "B"	1–0	1–0	North American Soccer Championship

== Personal life ==
Catliff recently worked as global Vice President of Sales with Helly Hansen outdoor apparel company but now works with Firstar Sports. He lives with his wife Sarah and his three soccer loving sons, Brendan (born 1994), and Jamie (born 1998), and Andrew Catliff (born 1996). John was the team Coach of the Vancouver Football Club Under 14 boys, where his son Jamie played. Catliff is an Honoured member of The Canadian Soccer Hall of Fame.

== Honours ==
Vancouver 86ers

- Canadian Soccer League: 5

1987, 1988, 1989, 1990, 1991

- Canadian Soccer League Top Goalscorer: 2

1988, 1990

Canada

- North American Nations Cup: 1990; 3rd place, 1991
