= 1991 North American Nations Cup =

Tournament details
- Host country: United States
- Dates: 12 – 16 March
- Teams: 3 (from 1 confederation)

Final positions
- Champions: Mexico (3rd title)
- Runners-up: United States
- Third place: Canada

Tournament statistics
- Matches played: 3
- Goals scored: 9 (3 per match)
- Attendance: 11,532 (3,844 per match)
- Top scorer(s): (United States) Bruce Murray (United States) Dante Washington (Mexico) Luís Roberto Alves (2 goals each)

The North American Nations Cup was the association football (soccer) championship for the CONCACAF's North American Zone.

== Overview ==
The tournament was seen as a disappointment, with promoters complaining that the Mexico Football Federation's decision to send their first choice team to play against Argentina in Buenos Aires had a severe effect on attendances. Promoter ProLink's Vice-President Fred Guzman commented that "We're disappointed because we expected Mexico's fans to carry the tournament. But where were the U.S. fans? The U.S. federation has to create a situation where people rally around the national team."

The Los Angeles Times reported that "not even Latinos bought the North American Nations Cup, which, in its second year, is having trouble holding the interest even of the three teams involved."

To prepare for the competition the US team played against Bermuda in Hamilton and Paraguayan club side Olimpia. Following the competition's completion, Bruce Murray was the U.S. all-time highest goalscorer with 13 goals.

== Venues ==
1991 North American Nations Cup is located in the United States	Los Angeles	Torrance
1991 North American Nations Cup is located in the United States	Los Angeles Memorial Coliseum	Murdock Stadium
1991 North American Nations Cup is located in the United States	Capacity: 93,607	Capacity: 12,127

== Results ==
Pos	Team	Pld	W	D	L	GF	GA	GD	Pts
1	Mexico (C)	2	1	1	0	5	2	+3	3
2	United States	2	1	1	0	4	2	+2	3
3	Canada	2	0	0	2	0	5	−5	0

Source: rsssf
(C) Champions
12 March 1991

United States	2–2	Mexico
Washington 44'; Murray 89'	(Report)	Valdéz 53'; Espinoza 75'

Los Angeles Memorial Coliseum, Los Angeles
Attendance: 5,261
Referee: López (GUA)
Team details

United States	Mexico

GK	1	Tony Meola
RB	2	Fernando Clavijo
CB	3	Paul Krumpe
CB	4	Alexi Lalas	(c)
LB	5	Marcelo Balboa
RM	7	Troy Dayak		(substituted off) 75'
CM	6	Chris Henderson
CM	10	Peter Vermes	(c)
LM	8	Dante Washington	44'	(substituted off) 46'
RF	9	Bruce Murray	89'
LF	21	Eric Wynalda
Substitutes:
LM	11	Dominic Kinnear		(substituted on) 46'
CM	19	Steve Trittschuh		(substituted on) 75'
Manager:
John Kowalski

GK	12	Hugo Pineda	(c)
RB	2	Antonio González Hernandez
CB	3	Pedro Osorio
CB	5	Rafael Gutiérrez Aldaco
LB	4	Abraham Nava
RM	7	Missael Espinoza	75'
CM	21	Carlos Barra
CM	6	Guillermo Vázquez		(substituted off) 64'
LM	8	Alberto García Aspe
RF	10	Luis Garcia
LF	9	Luis Antonio Valdéz	53'	(substituted on) 87'
Substitutes:
CM	15	Alfonso Sosa		(substituted off) 64'
CB	13	Juan de Dios Ramirez Perales		(substituted on) 87'
Manager:
Ignacio Trelles

14 March 1991

Mexico	3–0	Canada
Alves 5', 48'; Duana 53'	(Report)

Los Angeles Memorial Coliseum, Los Angeles
Attendance: 3,566
Referee: Martínez (ESA)
Team details

Canada	Mexico

GK	1	Pat Onstad
DF	2	Peter Sarantopoulos		(substituted off) 79'
DF	3	Drew Ferguson
DF	5	Patrick Diotte
DF	6	Ian Bridge
MF	7	Gerry Gray		(substituted off) 46'
MF	8	Lyndon Hooper
MF	13	Jamie Lowery
FW	9	Doug Muirhead
FW	10	John Catliff	Booked
FW	12	Nick Gilbert
Substitutes:
MF	4	Norm Odinga		(substituted on) 46'
MF	11	Geoff Aunger		(substituted on) 79'
Manager:
(England) Tony Waiters

GK	1	Hugo Pineda	Booked
RB	2	Juan Hernandez
CB	3	Pedro Osorio
CB	4	Guadalupe Castañeda
LB	5	Abraham Nava
RM	7	Jose Luis Gonzalez China		(substituted off) 46'
CM	6	Alfonso Sosa
CM	8	Carlos Barra
LM	11	Gonzalo Farfan
RF	10	Sergio Almaguer
LF	9	Luis Roberto Alves	(c) 5', 49'	(substituted off) 72'
Substitutes:
RM	13	Pedro Duana	53'	(substituted on) 46'
LF	19	Luis Garcia		(substituted on) 72'
Manager:
Ignacio Trelles

16 March 1991
13:00

United States	2–0	Canada
Washington 13'; Murray 60'	Report

Murdock Stadium, Torrance
Attendance: 2,705
Referee: Ortíz (ESA)

1991 North American Nations Cup

Mexico
Third title

== Goalscorers ==
2 goals

- (United States) Bruce Murray
- (United States) Dante Washington
- (Mexico) Luís Roberto Alves

1 goal

- (Mexico) Missael Espinoza
- (Mexico) Luis Antonio Valdéz
- (Mexico) Pedro Duana
