= Luis Valdéz (footballer) =

Mexican footballer (born 1965)

Luis Antonio Valdéz
Personal information
- Full name: Luis Antonio Valdéz Salas
- Date of birth: 1 July 1965 (age 61)
- Place of birth: Aguascalientes, Mexico
- Height: 1.79 m (5 ft 10 1/2 in)
- Position: Striker

Senior career*
Years	Team	Apps	(Gls)
1986–1991	Chivas	140	(25)
1991–1993	Monterrey	54	(11)
1993–1995	León	46	(14)
Total		240	(50)

International career
1989–1994	Mexico	11	(2)
- * Club domestic league appearances and goals

Luis Antonio Valdéz Salas (born 1 July 1965) is a Mexican former footballer who played at both professional and international levels as a striker. He is nicknamed El cadáver (The corpse).

Valdéz, who played club football for Chivas, Monterrey and León, represented the Mexico national team at the 1994 FIFA World Cup.
