= 1990 North American Nations Cup =

Three Nations Cup

Tournament details
- Host country: Canada
- Dates: 6 – 13 May
- Teams: 3 (from 1 confederation)

Final positions
- Champions: Canada (1st title)
- Runners-up: Mexico
- Third place: United States

Tournament statistics
- Matches played: 3
- Goals scored: 5 (1.67 per match)
- Attendance: 11,436 (3,812 per match)
- Top scorer: (Canada) John Catliff (3 goals)

The Corona Three Nations Cup (also referred to as the North American Nations Cup or North American Championship) was an association football championship for CONCACAF's North American Zone. The tournament featured host Canada along with Mexico and USA.

== Overview ==
The North American Football Confederation (NAFC) held a similar competition in 1947 and 1949. While Canada was a founding member of the NAFC, it did not participate in the first two championships. In 1990, the North American Zone re-introduced its championship, hosted by Canada. Although Mexico and Canada sent their full national teams, the U.S. sent its B-team and does not count these games as part of its official internationals.

== Participants ==
- Canada (Hosts)
- Mexico
- United States B (Note: The United States Soccer Federation sent the B-team because the official team was scheduled to play two friendly matches, against Malta and Poland, on May 5 and 9, in the preparation of the 1990 FIFA World Cup)

== Venues ==
Burnaby
Swangard Stadium
Capacity: 5,288
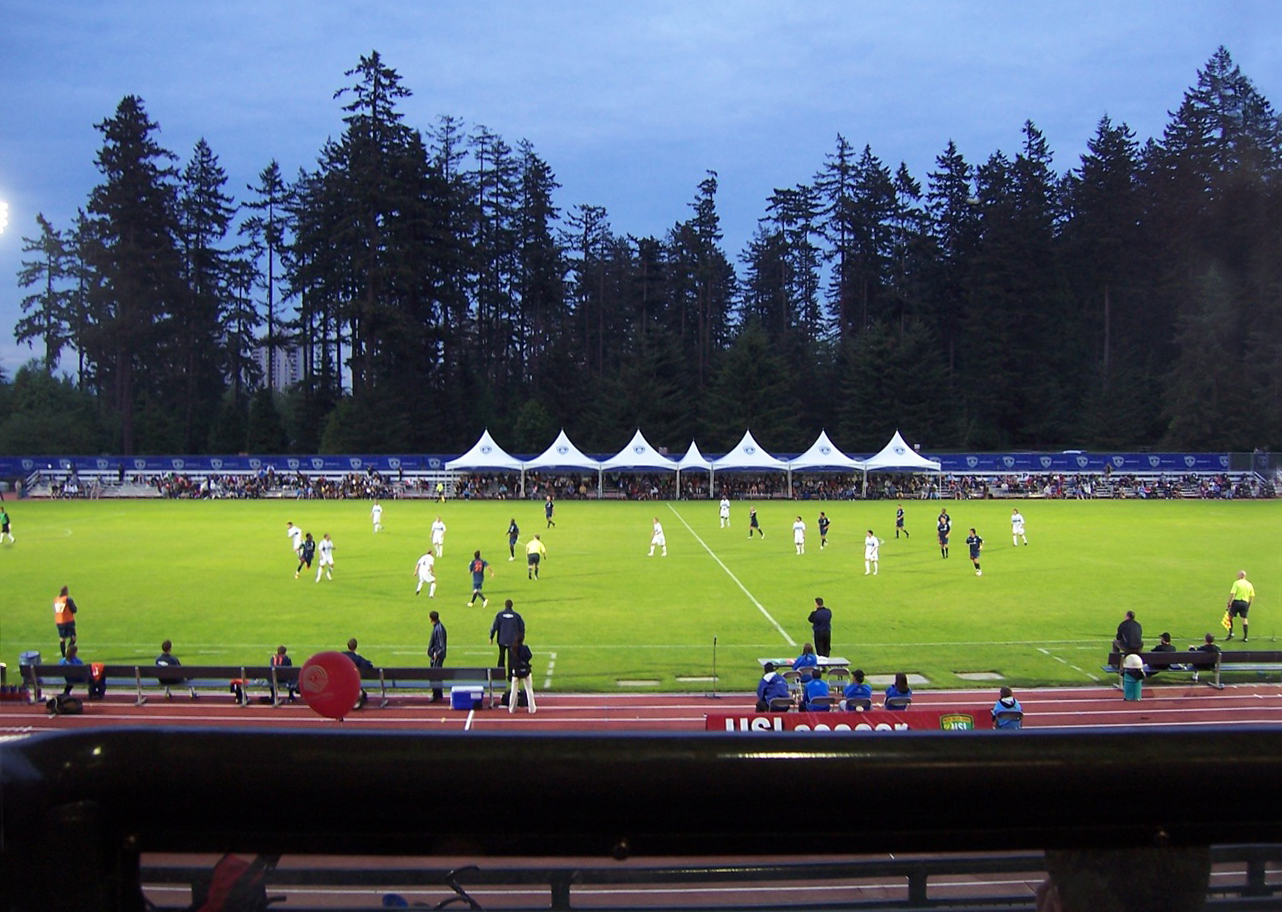

== Results ==
Pos	Team	Pld	W	D	L	GF	GA	GD	Pts
1	Canada (C)	2	2	0	0	3	1	+2	4
2	Mexico	2	1	0	1	2	2	0	2
3	United States B	2	0	0	2	0	2	−2	0

Source: rsssf
(C) Champions
6 May 1990
13:30

Canada	1–0	United States B
Catliff 34'	Report

Swangard Stadium, Burnaby
Attendance: 4,112

10 May 1990
20:30

Mexico	1–0	United States B
Flores 10'	(Report)	Eichmann (red card) 44'

Swangard Stadium, Burnaby
Attendance: 2,542

13 May 1990
13:30

Canada	2–1	Mexico
Catliff 16', 87'	Report	Aguirre (red card) 65'; Flores 68' (pen.)

Swangard Stadium, Burnaby
Attendance: 4,782
Team details

Canada	Mexico

GK	1	Craig Forrest
DF	2	Frank Yallop
DF	3	Colin Miller
DF	5	Randy Samuel
DF	6	Ian Bridge		Substituted off
MF	7	John Fitzgerald		Substituted off
MF	8	Mike Sweeney
MF	13	John Limniatis
FW	9	Jim Easton
FW	10	John Catliff	16'	88'
FW	12	Nick Gilbert
Substitutes:
MF	4	Peter Sarantopoulos		Substituted on
MF	11	Doug Muirhead		Substituted on
Manager:
(England) Tony Waiters

GK	1	Hugo Pineda
RB	2	Pedro Osorio
CB	3	Raul Servin
CB	4	Eduardo Rergis		(substituted off) 40'
LB	5	Hector Esparza
RM	8	Victor Medina
CM	10	Javier Aguirre	(red card) 64'
CM	6	Juan Morales
LM	7	Missael Espinoza
RF	11	Luis Flores	68' (pen.)
LF	9	Hugo Sanchez	(c)	(substituted off) 46'
Substitutes:
CB	13	Aurelio Rivera		(substituted on) 40'
LF	3	Sergio Pacheco		(substituted on) 46'
Manager:
Ignacio Trelles

1990 Nations Cup winners

Canada
First title

== Goalscorers ==
3 goals

- (Canada) John Catliff

2 goals

- (Mexico) Luis Flores
