= Toronto Blizzard (1986–1993) =

Former soccer team in Toronto, Ontario

- Founded: 1987
- Dissolved: 1993
- Stadium: Varsity Stadium; Centennial Park Stadium; Lamport Stadium
- League: National Soccer League (1986); Canadian Soccer League (1987–1992); American Professional Soccer League (1993)
| Home colours | Away colours | Third colours |

The second iteration of the Toronto Blizzard was a Canadian professional soccer team in Toronto, Ontario that competed in the Canadian Soccer League, National Soccer League, and the American Professional Soccer League. The club was formed shortly after the folding of the original team that coincided with the folding of the North American Soccer League. This edition of the club folded in 1993 after poor financial prospects and lack of attendance.

== History ==
=== Previous Blizzard team ===
The original Toronto Blizzard were formed in 1971 as the Toronto Metros playing in the North American Soccer League. In 1975, the club became known as Toronto Metro-Croatia after being purchased by Toronto Croatia. In 1979, the club was purchased by the Global Television Network and renamed the Toronto Blizzard with Toronto Croatia becoming their own separate team again. In September 1981, York-Hanover Sports Enterprises bought the franchise. After the 1984 season, the NASL folded on March 28, 1985, putting an end to the original edition of the Blizzard, who ceased operations on April 24.

=== Re-formation and National Soccer League ===
In June 1985, the owners of the Blizzard bought the rights to Dinamo Latino of the semi-professional National Soccer League and announced the re-creating the Blizzard for the 1986 season, as NSL regulations did not permit the name change in the middle of the season. The club played in the NSL for the 1986 season. In their first match, they defeated St. Catharines Roma by a score of 5–0. They went on to win the regular season title, losing only one match, but lost in the playoffs championship final to Toronto Italia. They also won the NSL Cup, qualifying them for the National Soccer League Cup Championship with the winners from Quebec and British Columbia, where they defeated Vancouver Columbus Italia in the final to claim the title.

=== Canadian Soccer League ===
In 1987, the Blizzard joined the new professional Canadian Soccer League for its inaugural season. In their debut CSL match, the Blizzard tied the North York Rockets, by a score of 1-1.

They finished their first season in the CSL in third place in the East Division, qualifying for the playoffs, where they defeated the National Capital Pioneers in the first round before being defeated by the Hamilton Steelers in the semi-finals. In 1988, after finishing second in the East Division, they were once again defeated by Hamilton in the semi-finals.

In the 1989 season, they won their first Division title, but for the third consecutive year were defeated by Hamilton in the semi-finals. During the 1989 season, they played a match against Brazilian club Flamengo, billed as the Canada Cup, which was the last international match for Flamengo footballer Zico, losing 2–0.

In 1990, they finished top of the East Division for the second consecutive year, but were defeated in the first round by expansion club Kitchener Spirit. In 1991, the Blizzard advanced to their first playoff championship final, but were defeated by the Vancouver 86ers, who won their fourth consecutive league championship. They struggled in their final season in the CSL, finishing last in the league, failing to qualify for the playoffs for the first time. The Blizzard had some financial issues, with the Vancouver 86ers owner paying playoff travel and accommodation expenses for the Blizzard.

=== American Professional Soccer League ===
Following the 1992 season, the CSL folded. The Blizzard decided to join the US-based American Professional Soccer League in 1993. Due to financial difficulties and abysmal attendance, the team was forced to move out of Varsity Stadium to the city of Toronto owned Lamport Stadium roughly three quarters of the way through the season. The club finished fifth in the regular season, failing to make the playoffs.

Blizzard owner Karsten Von Wersebe had taken the club from the CSL to the APSL in hopes that the league would be awarded US Division I status as FIFA had demanded that a national top-division soccer league exist in the United States as a condition of being awarded the 1994 FIFA World Cup. When the U.S. Soccer Federation instead decided to create a new league, Major League Soccer, it was a heavy blow to Von Wersebe and the struggling Blizzard and the club folded immediately at the conclusion of the 1993 season. After the team folded, they were replaced by the North York Rockets, who inherited some of the Blizzard players and played under the name Toronto Rockets.

=== Rumoured futures ===
In 2001, there were plans for a new league called the Canadian United Soccer League, with the Toronto Blizzard, under a new ownership group, reported to be interested in a franchise, however, this league never came to fruition. Later in 2005, the city of Toronto was awarded a Major League Soccer franchise and there was speculation that the club would be named the Blizzard, however, the team was instead called Toronto FC.

Today the Blizzard exists as a youth soccer club. In 2017, they formed a women's semi-professional team to play in League1 Ontario called the Toronto Azzurri Blizzard, however, the team only lasted two seasons.

== Seasons ==
| Season | Tier | League | Record | Rank | Playoffs | Ref |
|---|---|---|---|---|---|---|
| 1986 | 2 | National Soccer League | 10–1–3 | 1st | Finalists | |
| 1987 | 1 | Canadian Soccer League | 6–8–6 | 3rd, East | Semi-Finals | |
| 1988 | 1 | Canadian Soccer League | 8–13–7 | 2nd, East | Semi-Finals | |
| 1989 | 1 | Canadian Soccer League | 16–6–4 | 1st, East | Semi-Finals | |
| 1990 | 1 | Canadian Soccer League | 18–3–5 | 1st, East | Quarter-Finals | |
| 1991 | 1 | Canadian Soccer League | 14–6–8 | 2nd | Finalists | |
| 1992 | 1 | Canadian Soccer League | 6–6–8 | 6th | Did not qualify | |
| 1993 | 1 (US) | American Professional Soccer League | 10–14 | 5th | Did not qualify | |
