= North American Nations Cup =

- Organizer(s): NAFU
- Founded: 1990
- Abolished: 1991
- Region: North America
- Teams: 3
- Related competitions: Copa Centroamericana/Copa de Naciones UNCAF; Caribbean Cup/CFU Championship
- Last champion(s): Mexico (1st title)
- Most championships: Mexico; Canada (1 title each)

The North American Nations Cup was an association football competition organized by NAFU as its top regional tournament for men's senior national teams from North America. The tournament was held in 1990 and 1991.

Canada, United States and Mexico were the three participating teams in both editions. Another edition was planned to be held in 1992 but was canceled because Mexico and United States decided to participate in the 1992 Amistad Cup.

== Participating teams ==
The 3 NAFU members participated on the tournament:

- Canada
- Mexico
- United States

== Results ==
Year	Hosts	Champions	Runners-up	Third place
1990	Canada	Canada	Mexico	United States
1991	United States	Mexico	United States	Canada

== Performances ==
Team	Champions	Runners-up	Third place	Total
Mexico	1 (1991)	1 (1990)	–	2
Canada	1 (1990)	–	1 (1991)	2
United States	–	1 (1991)	1 (1990)	2

Notes

Italic — Hosts

== See also ==
- NAFU
- UNCAF
- CFU
- Copa Centroamericana/Copa de Naciones UNCAF
- Caribbean Cup/CFU Championship
