= 1993 Vancouver 86ers season =

Vancouver 86ers 1993 soccer season

Vancouver 86ers
1993 season
- Chairman: Milan Ilich
- Head coach: Bob Lenarduzzi
- Stadium: Swangard Stadium
- 1993 APSL: Regular season: 1st Playoffs: Semifinals
- Average home league attendance: 4,866
Home colours	Away colours

The 1993 Vancouver 86ers season was the club's eighth year of existence (or 19th if counting the NASL Whitecaps), as well as their first as a Division 2 club in the franchise model of U.S.-based soccer leagues. After their 1992 CSL season, the CSL folded and the Whitecaps joined the American Professional Soccer League for the 1993 season. They continued the tradition of excellence from the CSL capturing the Commissioner’s Cup (regular season) but losing the playoff semifinal in a shootout to the Los Angeles Salsa.

The 86ers also changed their colours from yellow/red/blue to white/black/red and created a new logo of a soccer ball striking a goal net. They were familiar with the league's teams as two others were Canadian teams (Toronto Blizzard and the Montreal Supra resurrected as Montreal Impact), Vancouver lost a 1992 North American Club Championship series to the 1992 APSL Champion Colorado Foxes, and Vancouver had played preseason matches against Seattle Sounders, Los Angeles, and San Francisco based teams through the CSL years.

== Schedule and results ==
The competition was a single table on the league principle with a balanced schedule home and away where each of the seven teams plays the other six four times. The league`s regular season was played over twenty weeks, beginning April 30 and concluding September 12. The top four in the table qualified for a single-elimination tournament held in September. The league was a generally close competition, given the unique points system adopted all teams were still in the playoff race into early August or about 70% of the season. The unique rules includes 6pts for a win, 4pts for a shootout win, 2pts for a shootout loss, and bonus points for goals to a maximum of three. If the game was tied instead of following FIFA rules of two sudden death thirty-minute extra halves followed by penalty kicks, the APSL did two 7.5 minute extra halves followed by the NASL shootout. The shootout consisted of the player starting at midfield, goalkeeper in net, and five seconds for the player to score (essentially a timed five second break-away skills competition). In 1993 before the USSF chose MLS as Division 1, a couple teams had significant capital backing, had local TV and radio deals, and many of the players were U.S. national team hopefuls or Canadian internationals. Game day rosters had to have eleven of the eighteen as domestic players.

The 86ers were at the top of the table most of the year with a significant lead in the league table until the last six games. At the start of the season, until the sixth match versus Ft. Lauderdale, the team was without its coach, Bob Lenarduzzi, and six members of the Canada men's national soccer team as they were in the national team camp and playing 1994 FIFA World Cup qualifying games. Due to Canada's loss to Mexico 1–2 in World Cup qualifying and subsequent second place final round finish, the 86ers were also missing players for the CONCACAF–OFC play-off versus Australia at the end of the season during the start of their swoon in league results. To save on travel costs, the teams played back-to-back on consecutive days, for example the games versus the Tampa Bay Rowdies were the day after Ft. Lauderdale Strikers games all season. At the end of the season the 86ers allowed a number of late goals extending games as draws were not officially recognized including in the playoff game where they were eliminated in an NASL style shootout.

=== Tables ===
Points:

- Win: 6
- Shoot out win: 4
- Shoot out loss: 2
- 1 bonus point per goal scored in regulation, maximum of 3 per game

Place	Team	GP	W	L	WN	WE	WS	LN	LE	LS	GF	GA	GD	Points
1	Vancouver 86ers	24	15	9	11	2	2	8	0	1	43	35	+8	126
2	Colorado Foxes	24	15	9	12	0	3	6	3	0	40	34	+6	121
3	Tampa Bay Rowdies	24	12	12	10	2	0	10	1	1	53	47	+6	118
4	Los Angeles Salsa	24	12	12	8	1	3	9	0	3	41	37	+4	109
5	Toronto Blizzard	24	10	14	8	2	0	11	1	2	35	41	−6	97
6	Fort Lauderdale Strikers	24	9	15	8	0	1	11	1	3	39	52	−13	94
7	Montreal Impact	24	11	13	9	0	2	11	1	1	28	33	−5	90

Expanded table

Overall								Home						Away					
Pld	Pts	W	L	T	GF	GA	GD	W	L	T	GF	GA	GD	W	L	T	GF	GA	GD
22	36	11	8	3	39	32	+7	6	3	1	20	11	+9	5	5	2	19	21	−2

Last updated: April 26, 2010
Pld = Matches played; Pts = Points; W = Matches won; T = Matches tied; L = Matches lost; GF = Goals for; GA = Goals against; GD = Goal difference

=== Pre-season ===
Win Draw Loss

April 17, 1993	Colorado Foxes	2–0	Vancouver Whitecaps FC

April 17, 1993	Los Angeles Salsa	0–1	Vancouver Whitecaps FC

These games were sixty-minute exhibitions, not full ninety-minute contests.

=== APSL ===
==== Results by round ====
Round	1	2	3	4	5	6	7	8	9	10	11	12	13	14	15	16	17	18	19	20	21	22	23	24
Ground	H	H	H	A	A	A	A	A	H	H	H	A	H	H	A	A	H	H	H	A	A	A	A	H
Result	W	L	W	W	W	W	L	W	W	W	L	W	W	W	L	L	W	W	L	L	D	D	L	D

Source: a-leaguearchive.tripod.com
A = Away; H = Home; W = Win; D = Draw; L = Loss

April 30, 1993 1	Vancouver 86ers	2–1	Toronto Blizzard	Burnaby, BC
22:05 ET	Geoff Aunger 3', 48'	Report	Fernando Aguiar 90'	Stadium: Swangard Stadium; Attendance: 4,220

May 9, 1993 2	Vancouver 86ers	1–2	Los Angeles Salsa	Burnaby, BC
21:35 ET	Carlo Corazzin 12'	Report	Paulinho Criciúma; Paul Wright 83'	Stadium: Swangard Stadium; Attendance: 3,753

May 21, 1993 3	Vancouver 86ers	2–0	Colorado Foxes	Burnaby, BC
22:05 ET	John Catliff 42'; Carlo Corazzin 90'	Report		Stadium: Swangard Stadium

May 29, 1993 4	Toronto Blizzard	1–2	Vancouver 86ers	Toronto, Ontario
14:05 ET	Hector Marinaro 58'	Report	Domenic Mobilio 66', 76'	Stadium: Varsity Stadium; Attendance: 800

May 30, 1993 5	Montreal Impact	0–2	Vancouver 86ers	Montreal
		Report	Jim Easton Jr. 28'; Domenic Mobilio 45'	Stadium: Complexe sportif Claude-Robillard; Attendance: 4,027

June 5, 1993 6	Ft Lauderdale Strikers	1–2	Vancouver 86ers	Fort Lauderdale, Florida
19:35 ET	Zenon Luzniak 58'	Report	Geoff Aunger 46'; Ivor Evans 66'	Stadium: Lockhart Stadium

June 6, 1993 7	Tampa Bay Rowdies	6–2	Vancouver 86ers	Tampa, Florida
	Kevin Sloan 21'; Jon Parry 45'; Paul Dougherty 55'; Gerard Gregoire 69'; Brad Smith 77', 83'	Report	Jim Easton Jr. 40'; Dale Mitchell 69'	Stadium: Tampa Stadium

June 13, 1993 8	Los Angeles Salsa	2–3	Vancouver 86ers	Fullerton, California
19:05 ET	Paul Wright 4'; Waldir Guerra 27'	Report	Carlo Corazzin 3'; Domenic Mobilio 77', 85'	Stadium: Titan Stadium; Attendance: 2,082

June 16, 1993 9	Vancouver 86ers	1–0	Toronto Blizzard	Burnaby, BC
22:05 ET	Dale Mitchell 5'	Report		Stadium: Swangard Stadium

June 25, 1993 10	Vancouver 86ers	3–2	Colorado Foxes	Burnaby, BC
22:05 ET	Ivor Evans 42'; Domenic Mobilio 82'; Carl Valentine 95'	Report	Taifour Diane 5'; Scott Benedetti 17'	Stadium: Swangard Stadium

July 1, 1993 11	Vancouver Whitecaps FC	0–2	Montreal Impact	Burnaby, BC
18:05 ET		Report	Grant Needham 31'; Nick Dasovic 72'	Stadium: Swangard Stadium; Attendance: 5,196

July 3, 1993 12	Colorado Foxes	1–2	Vancouver 86ers	Englewood, Colorado
20:30 ET	Mark Santel 19'	Report	Dale Mitchell 77'; Doug Muirhead 98'	Stadium: Englewood High School Stadium

July 9, 1993 13	Vancouver 86ers	2–1	Ft Lauderdale Strikers	Burnaby, BC
22:05 ET	Carlo Corazzin 33', 78'	Report	John Claire 64'	Stadium: Swangard Stadium

July 16, 1993 14	Vancouver Whitecaps FC	3–1	Tampa Bay Rowdies	Burnaby, BC
22:05 ET	John Catliff 15'; Rick Celebrini 67'; Ivor Evans 90'	Report	David Vaudreuil 85'	Stadium: Swangard Stadium

July 24, 1993 15	Ft Lauderdale Strikers	4–3	Vancouver 86ers	Fort Lauderdale, Florida
19:35 ET	Juan Castillo 25'; Zico Doe 68'; Eric Eichmann 77'; Alvin James 90'	Report	Ivor Evans 11'; Domenic Mobilio 21', 89'	Stadium: Lockhart Stadium

July 25, 1993 16	Tampa Bay Rowdies	2–0	Vancouver 86ers	Tampa, Florida
	Jean Harbor 69'; Steve Trittschuh 75'	Report	Scott Munson 60'	Stadium: Tampa Stadium

July 30, 1993 17	Vancouver Whitecaps FC	2–1	Montreal Impact	Burnaby, BC
22:05 ET	Nick Gilbert 49'; Scott Munson 84'	Report	Lloyd Barker 56'	Stadium: Swangard Stadium; Attendance: 4,629

August 6, 1993 18	Vancouver Whitecaps FC	6–1	Ft Lauderdale Strikers	Burnaby, BC
22:05 ET	Carlo Corazzin 49'; Dale Mitchell 51'; Domenic Mobilio 53', 56'; Scott Munson 83', 85'	Report	Zico Doe 68'	Stadium: Swangard Stadium

August 12, 1993 19	Vancouver Whitecaps FC	0- 1	Tampa Bay Rowdies	Burnaby, BC
22:05 ET		Report	Steve Trittschuh 73'	Stadium: Swangard Stadium

August 14, 1993 20	Toronto Blizzard	1–0	Vancouver 86ers	Toronto, Ontario
14:05 ET	Nigel Sparks 90'	Report		Stadium: Lamport Stadium; Attendance: 300; Referee: Russ Hepworth

August 15, 1993 21	Montreal Impact	0–0 (3–0 p)	Vancouver 86ers	Montreal
		Report		Stadium: Complexe sportif Claude-Robillard; Attendance: 3,874

September 4, 1993 22	Los Angeles Salsa	1–1 (W p)	Vancouver 86ers	Fullerton, California
23:05 ET	Paul Wright 77'	Report	Carlo Corazzin 49'	Stadium: Titan Stadium; Attendance: 3,584

September 5, 1993 23	Colorado Foxes	2–1	Vancouver 86ers	Englewood, Colorado
	Scott Benedetti 25', 41'	Report	Doug Muirhead 43'	Stadium: Englewood High School Stadium

September 8, 1993 24	Vancouver Whitecaps FC	2–2 (4–2 p)	Los Angeles Salsa	Burnaby, BC
22:05 ET	Doug Muirhead 7'; Rick Celebrini 77'	Report	Danny Pena 26'; Paul Wright 85'	Stadium: Swangard Stadium; Attendance: 5,744

==== Post-season ====
September 18, 1993	Vancouver 86ers (BC)	2–2 (1–3 p)	Los Angeles Salsa (CA)	Burnaby, BC
17:05 PM ET]	Domenic Mobilio 41' (pen.); Dale Mitchell 80'	Report	Danny Pena 67'; Paulinho 90'	Stadium: Swangard Stadium; Attendance: 5,027
	Penalties
	Carl Valentine (penalty scored); Dale Mitchell (penalty missed); Rick Celebrini (penalty missed); Domenic Mobilio (penalty missed)		(penalty scored) Paul Wright; (penalty scored) Rich Ryerson; (penalty scored) Paulinho; (penalty missed) Thor Lee

== Roster ==
=== Goalkeeper stats ===
No.	Nat.	Player	Total					APSL					Playoffs				
No.	Nat.	Player	MIN	SV	GA	GAA	SO	MIN	SV	GA	GAA	SO	MIN	SV	GA	GAA	SO
29	(Canada)	Paul Dolan	2231	12	35	1.42	4	2070	11	23	1.435	4	105	1	2	2.00	0
	(Canada)	Cory Breure	34			0.00	0	34		0	0.00	0					

Last updated: January 27, 2007.

- Note: Minutes played and saves statistics are incomplete (see notes below).

=== Player statistics ===
No.	Pos.	Name	Apps	Minutes	Goals	Assists	Shots	Fouls	Yellow card	Red card		
No.	Pos.	Name		GK	(Canada) Cory Breure	(1)	34	0			0	0
2	DF	(Canada) Rick Celebrini	13	1073	2				1	0		
	FW	(Canada) Nick Gilbert	4	267	1				0	0		
3	DF	Tom Kim	6(3)	723	0				0	0		
4	MF	(Canada) Mark Watson	8(1)	787	0				0	0		
5	DF	(Canada) Steve MacDonald	21	1913	0				0	0		
6	FW	(Canada) Geoff Aunger	11(2)	856	3				0	0		
8	MF	(Canada) Jim Easton Jr.	15(1)	1330	2				0	0		
9	FW	(Canada) John Catliff	9	744	2				0	0		
10	FW	(Canada) Domenic Mobilio	16	1317	11				0	0		
11	DF	(Fiji) Ivor Evans	23	2128	4				1	0		
12	DF	(Canada) Jean-Paul Knezevic	(2)	49	0				0	0		
	DF	(United States) Doug Morrill	2	130	0				0	0		
13	DF	(Canada) David Norman	13	1130	0				1	0		
14	MF	(Canada) Dale Mitchell	13(5)	1274	5	2			0	0		
15	MF	(Canada) Doug Muirhead	17(5)	1712	3				0	0		
16	DF	(Canada) Doug McKinty	15(5)	1572	0				0	0		
	DF	(Canada) Norm Odinga	8(1)	633	0				0	0		
17	FW	(Canada) Carlo Corazzin	23(1)	1985	7				0	0		
20	FW	(Canada) Scott Munson	5(1)	487	4				0	0		
21	FW	(Canada) Carl Valentine	11(4)	1129	1	2			0	0		
23	MF	(Canada) Mike Dodd	1(2)	205	0				0	0		
24	DF	(Canada) Steve Millar	5	395	0				0	0		
29	GK	(Canada) Paul Dolan	25	2216	0	0	0		0	0		
	MF	(Canada) Guido Titotto	2	180	0				0	0		
	MF	(Canada) Scott Macey	1	90	0				0	0		
	FW	(Canada) Carlos Batista										
	GK	(Canada) Rob Merkl	(1)	1								
—	–	Opponent Own goals	–	–	1	–	–	–	–	–		

Updated January 27, 2007
- Note: this list includes only players that actually played.
- Note: brackets indicate substitute appearances.
- Note statistics are for league and playoffs (not preseason).
- Note: 2011 and 2012 MLS Whitecap media guides and Miami's Sun Sentinel and the Los Angeles Times newspaper archives were used to augment game times, player statistics, and attendance.
- Note statistics are incomplete for player numbers, assists, shots, fouls, and cards. Minutes played also appear not to have included the five 15-minute overtime periods during the season or the playoff game.
