= 1998 Dallas Burn season =

Dallas Burn
1998 season
- Owner: Major League Soccer
- Head coach: Dave Dir
- Stadium: Cotton Bowl
- MLS: Western Conference: 3rd Overall: 7th
- MLS Cup: Lost Western Conference Semifinals vs. Los Angeles Galaxy (0–2)
- U.S. Open Cup: Lost Semifinal vs. Chicago Fire (2–3)
- Average home league attendance: 10,947
Home colors	Away colors

The 1998 Dallas Burn season was the third season of the Major League Soccer team. The team made the playoffs for the third consecutive year.

== Final standings ==
=== Western Conference ===
Pos	Team	Pld	W	SOW	L	GF	GA	GD	Pts	Qualification
1	Los Angeles Galaxy	32	22	2	8	85	44	+41	68	MLS Cup Playoffs
2	Chicago Fire	32	18	2	12	62	45	+17	56	MLS Cup Playoffs
3	Colorado Rapids	32	14	2	16	62	69	−7	44	MLS Cup Playoffs
4	Dallas Burn	32	11	4	17	43	59	−16	37	MLS Cup Playoffs
5	San Jose Clash	32	10	3	19	48	60	−12	33	
6	Kansas City Wizards	32	10	2	20	45	50	−5	32	

Source: MLS

=== Overall table ===
Pos	Team	Pld	W	SOW	L	GF	GA	GD	Pts
5	Colorado Rapids	32	14	2	16	62	69	−7	44
6	MetroStars	32	12	3	17	54	63	−9	39
7	Dallas Burn	32	11	4	17	43	59	−16	37
8	Miami Fusion	32	10	5	17	46	68	−22	35
9	Tampa Bay Mutiny	32	11	1	20	46	57	−11	34

Source: MLS
Rules for classification: 1) points; 2) head-to-head record; 3) goal difference; 4) number of goals scored

== Regular season ==
March 21, 1998 1	Colorado Rapids	1–1 (1–2 SO)	Dallas Burn	Dallas, Texas
7:30 PM CST	Santel 27' (o.g.); C. Henderson (yellow card) 33'; Paz (yellow card) 60'	Report	Soehn (yellow card) 29'; Washington 37'; Sutter (yellow card) 39'; Pollard (yellow card) 59'; Eck (red card) 68'	Stadium: Cotton Bowl; Attendance: 11,103; Referee: Kevin Stott; Assistant referees: Tom Bobadilla; Paul Scott
	Shootout
	Paz (penalty missed); Bravo (penalty scored); Saenz (penalty missed); Marquinho (penalty missed); C. Henderson (penalty missed)		Sutter (penalty missed); Elliott (penalty scored); Sawatzky (penalty missed); Soehn (penalty missed); Santel (penalty scored)

March 29, 1998 2	Columbus Crew	1–2	Dallas Burn	Dallas, Texas
2:00 PM CST	McBride 13'; Lapper (yellow card) 56'	Report	Rodríguez (yellow card) 21'; Elliott 39'; Washington 66'; Kreis (yellow card) 80'	Stadium: Cotton Bowl; Attendance: 10,216; Referee: Esse Baharmast; Assistant referees: Chip Reed; Misail Tsapos

April 5, 1998 3	Dallas Burn	2–2 (3–2 SO)	San Jose Clash	Palo Alto, California
12:00 PM PDT	Eck 5'; Suarez (yellow card) 35'; Kreis 48'	Report	Wynalda 13'; Mella 83'; Vásquez (yellow card) 86'	Stadium: Stanford Stadium; Attendance: 10,069; Referee: Noel Kenny; Assistant referees: Ricardo Valenzuela; Sandra Hunt
	Shootout
	Haynes (penalty missed); Soehn (penalty missed); Farrer (penalty scored); Kreis (penalty missed); Eck (penalty scored); Sutter (penalty scored)		Mella (penalty missed); Wynalda (penalty missed); Lewis (penalty scored); Cerritos (penalty scored); Baicher (penalty missed); Barrett (penalty missed)

April 11, 1998 4	Dallas Burn	1–3	Tampa Bay Mutiny	Tampa, Florida
7:30 PM EDT	Flores 57'	Report	Gilmar 11' (pen.); Hejduk 14', 48'	Stadium: Houlihan's Stadium; Attendance: 11,822; Referee: Arturo Angeles; Assistant referees: Kermit Quisenberry; Roger O'Brien

April 18, 1998 5	San Jose Clash	2–1	Dallas Burn	Dallas, Texas
7:30 PM CDT	Doyle (yellow card) 28'; Cerritos (yellow card) 42'; Weaver (yellow card) 45'; Mella 71'; Lozzano 76'	Report	Kreis (red card) 14'; Elliott 52'	Stadium: Cotton Bowl; Attendance: 12,939; Referee: Ali Saheli; Assistant referees: Laszlo Nagy; Misail Tsapos

April 25, 1998 6	Kansas City Wizards	1–3	Dallas Burn	Dallas, Texas
7:30 PM CDT	Rideout (yellow card) 10'; Tinsley 30'	Report	Dade (yellow card) 10'; Elliott 50'; Damián 68' (yellow card) 72'; Santel (yellow card) 78'; Washington 83'	Stadium: Cotton Bowl; Attendance: 13,134; Referee: Juan Paniaqua; Assistant referees: Tom Bobadilla; Sergio Vega

May 6, 1998 7	Dallas Burn	1–0	MetroStars	East Rutherford, New Jersey
7:30 PM EDT	Kreis 19'; Eck (yellow card) 90'	Report	da Silva (yellow card) 15'; Ramos (yellow card) 48'; Savarese (yellow card) 70'	Stadium: Giants Stadium; Attendance: 10,300; Referee: Brian Hall; Assistant referees: Alex Prus; Alex Shuster

May 16, 1998 8	Colorado Rapids	1–2	Dallas Burn	Dallas, Texas
7:30 PM CDT	Bravo (yellow card) 49'; DiGiamarino (yellow card) 57'; Jakins (red card) 74'; Harris 86'	Report	Washington 12'; Damián (yellow card) 13'; Flores (yellow card) 17'; Álvarez (yellow card) 57' (yellow-red card) 70'; Kreis 62' (yellow card) 81'	Stadium: Cotton Bowl; Attendance: 15,280; Referee: Ricardo Valenzuela; Assistant referees: Chip Reed; Andrew Barnes

May 20, 1998 9	Kansas City Wizards	1–1 (4–3 SO)	Dallas Burn	Dallas, Texas
7:30 PM CDT	Rodríguez 84' (o.g.)	Report	Trotman 86'	Stadium: Cotton Bowl; Attendance: 9,179; Referee: Refugio Ramirez; Assistant referees: Tom Bobadilla; Sergio Vega
	Shootout
	Wright (penalty scored); Takawira (penalty missed); Rideout (penalty scored); Šabanadžović (penalty scored); Tinsley (penalty missed); Johnston (penalty scored)		Elliott (penalty missed); Haynes (penalty scored); Farrer (penalty missed); Suarez (penalty scored); Eck (penalty scored); Flores (penalty missed)

May 23, 1998 10	Dallas Burn	1–4	Los Angeles Galaxy	Pasadena, California
7:30 PM PDT	Eck (yellow card) 18'; Damián (yellow card) 48'; Haynes 63'	Report	Sánchez 4' (yellow card) 42'; Mathis 25', 66'; Peña (yellow card) 37'; Wélton 48'	Stadium: Rose Bowl; Attendance: 21,173; Referee: Tim Weyland; Assistant referees: Chris Strickland; Chris Nuezil

May 31, 1998 11	Miami Fusion	0–2	Dallas Burn	Dallas, Texas
2:00 PM CDT	Kmosko (yellow card) 16' (yellow-red card) 24'; Tamashiro (yellow card) 37'	Report	Pollard (yellow card) 16'; Kreis 37'; Álvarez (yellow card) 41'; Washington 82'	Stadium: Cotton Bowl; Attendance: 10,101; Referee: Reggie Rutty; Assistant referees: Glenn Prechac; Sergio Vega

June 4, 1998 12	Los Angeles Galaxy	8–1	Dallas Burn	Dallas, Texas
7:00 PM CDT	Wélton 13'; Vanney 18'; Franchino (yellow card) 39'; Mathis 45'; Hendrickson 47', 81' (yellow card) 60'; Karapetyan 82', 85', 87'	Report	Kreis (yellow card) 1'; Álvarez (yellow card) 17' (yellow-red card) 18'; Damián 44'	Stadium: Cotton Bowl; Attendance: 10,047; Referee: Alex Prus; Assistant referees: Scott Weyland; Ralph Boggs

June 7, 1998 13	Dallas Burn	4–4 (3–1 SO)	D.C. United	Washington, D.C.
3:00 PM EDT	Suarez 24'; Farrer 38'; Damián 56' (pen.); Trotman 88'	Report	Lassiter 19', 70'; Etcheverry 31'; Soehn 88' (o.g.)	Stadium: Robert F. Kennedy Memorial Stadium; Attendance: 13,454; Referee: Refugio Ramirez; Assistant referees: Greg Barkey; Todd Perry
	Shootout
	Haynes (penalty missed); Farrer (penalty scored); Suarez (penalty scored); Soehn (penalty missed); Eck (penalty scored)		Moreno (penalty missed); Etcheverry (penalty missed); Kamler (penalty scored); Sanneh (penalty missed)

June 17, 1998 14	Dallas Burn	0–1	Chicago Fire	Chicago, Illinois
7:30 PM CDT	Álvarez (yellow card) 33'; Soehn (yellow card) 55'; Eck (yellow card) 88'; Santel (yellow card) 90'	Report	Kubík 64' (pen.); Armas (yellow card) 85'	Stadium: Soldier Field; Attendance: 9,638; Referee: Michael Kennedy; Assistant referees: Tarek Khan; Francisco Sanchez

June 21, 1998 15	Tampa Bay Mutiny	1–0	Dallas Burn	Dallas, Texas
6:00 PM CDT	Prampin 50'	Report		Stadium: Cotton Bowl; Attendance: 10,238; Referee: Robert Sheker; Assistant referees: Roger Sill; Glenn Prechac

June 27, 1998 16	Dallas Burn	3–3 (4–2 SO)	New England Revolution	Foxborough, Massachusetts
7:00 PM EDT	Kreis 19'; Damián 44'; Eck 65' (yellow card) 82'	Report	Díaz Arce 6'; Eck 9' (o.g.); Gorter 28'	Stadium: Foxboro Stadium; Attendance: 18,206; Referee: Ruben Rodhas; Assistant referees: Edwin Resenedes; Del Rainho
	Shootout
	Farrer (penalty scored); Haynes (penalty scored); Suarez (penalty missed); Santel (penalty scored); Eck (penalty scored)		Baba (penalty scored); McKinley (penalty missed); Burns (penalty scored); Moore (penalty missed)

July 1, 1998 17	Dallas Burn	1–4	Chicago Fire	Chicago, Illinois
7:30 PM CDT	Haynes 14'; Trotman (yellow card) 35'; Pollard (yellow card) 66'	Report	Kubík 7' (yellow card) 49'; Razov 16'; Kosecki 20'; Podbrożny 36'	Stadium: Soldier Field; Attendance: 13,615; Referee: Kevin Terry; Assistant referees: Andrew Barnes; Thomas Smith

July 4, 1998 18	Chicago Fire	1–0	Dallas Burn	Dallas, Texas
7:30 PM CDT	Kubík 37'; Kosecki (yellow card) 44'; Brown (yellow card) 75'	Report	Flores (yellow card) 41'; Rodríguez (yellow card) 68'; Elliott (yellow card) 83'	Stadium: Cotton Bowl; Attendance: 12,372; Referee: Tim Weyland; Assistant referees: Sandra Hunt; Misail Tsapos

July 11, 1998 19	Dallas Burn	0–2	Kansas City Wizards	Kansas City, Missouri
7:30 PM CDT	Farrer (yellow card) 5'; Dade (yellow card) 50'; Álvarez (yellow card) 63'; Dir (red card) 63'	Report	Wright 47'; Uderitz (yellow card) 78'; Johnston 90'	Stadium: Arrowhead Stadium; Attendance: 10,053; Referee: Arturo Angeles; Assistant referees: Francisco Sanchez; Alan Shepherd

July 18, 1998 20	New England Revolution	3–1	Dallas Burn	Dallas, Texas
7:30 CDT	McKinley 49' (yellow card) 64'; Pareja (yellow card) 52'; Moore 67', 88'; Causey (yellow card) 87'	Report	Trotman 32'; Álvarez (yellow card) 38'; Deering (yellow card) 78'	Stadium: Cotton Bowl; Attendance: 10,073; Referee: Rich Grady; Assistant referees: Chris Strickland; Sergio Vega

July 25, 1998 21	Dallas Burn	2–1	Columbus Crew	Columbus, Ohio
7:30 PM EDT	Trotman 10'; Farrer (yellow card) 79'; Santel (yellow card) 82'; Rodríguez 85'	Report	Yeagley (yellow card) 9' (goal) 41'	Stadium: Ohio Stadium; Attendance: 15,628; Referee: Noel Kenny; Assistant referees: Jorge Reyes; Patrick Ruetschle

July 29, 1998 22	Los Angeles Galaxy	0–3	Dallas Burn	Dallas, Texas
7:30 PM CDT	Fraser (red card) 33'	Report	Kreis 6' (yellow card) 50'; Trotman 52'; Álvarez (yellow card) 57'; Washington 71'; Rodríguez (yellow card) 82'	Stadium: Cotton Bowl; Attendance: 9,720; Referee: Kevin Terry; Assistant referees: Kari Seitz; Ralph Boggs

August 7, 1998 23	D.C. United	1–0	Dallas Burn	Dallas, Texas
7:30 CDT	Lassiter 57' (pen.); Pope (yellow card) 84'	Report	Dade (yellow card) 15'; Trotman (yellow card) 35'; Rodríguez (yellow card) 48'; Dodd (yellow card) 56'	Stadium: Cotton Bowl; Attendance: 9,437; Referee: Ali Saheli; Assistant referees: Andrew Barnes; Kari Seitz

August 15, 1998 24	Dallas Burn	1–0	Colorado Rapids	Denver, Colorado
7:00 MDT	Deering 57'; Pollard (yellow card) 67'	Report	Trittschuh (yellow card) 22'	Stadium: Mile High Stadium; Attendance: 8,321; Referee: Noel Kenny; Assistant referees: Greg Barkey; Levon Baladjanian

August 19, 1998 25	Dallas Burn	1–2	Miami Fusion	Fort Lauderdale, Florida
7:30 PM EDT	Álvarez (yellow card) 18'; Washington (yellow card) 39'; Deering 85'	Report	Valderrama 50' (pen.); Gutierrez 87'	Stadium: Lockhart Stadium; Attendance: 7,051; Referee: Refugio Ramirez; Assistant referees: Laszlo Nagy; Richard Huber

August 22, 1998 26	Dallas Burn	1–1 (0–2 SO)	San Jose Clash	San Jose, California
7:00 PM PDT	Álvarez (yellow card) 49'; Trotman (yellow card) 66'; Haynes 76'	Report	Medved (yellow card) 29'; Cerritos 32'; Barrett (yellow card) 34'	Stadium: Spartan Stadium; Attendance: 11,706; Referee: Noel Kenny; Assistant referees: Jorge Reyes; Terry Mashino
	Shootout
	Farrer (penalty missed); Haynes (penalty missed); Elliott (penalty missed); Trotman (penalty missed)		Wynalda (penalty missed); Lewis (penalty missed); Mella (penalty scored); Medved (penalty scored)

August 29, 1998 27	MetroStars	0–2	Dallas Burn	Dallas, Texas
7:30 PM CDT	Palacios (yellow card) 21'; Sorber (yellow card) 79'; Vega (yellow card) 84'	Report	Kreis (yellow card) 28' (goal) 72'; Deering (red card) 30'; Eck (yellow card) 38'; Rodríguez 87'	Stadium: Cotton Bowl; Attendance: 11,235; Referee: Nancy Lay; Assistant referees: Laszlo Nagy; Greg Barkey

September 2, 1998 28	Dallas Burn	0–3	Los Angeles Galaxy	Pasadena, California
7:30 PDT	Dade (yellow card) 74'	Report	Cienfuegos 29'; Fraser (yellow card) 33'; Hermosillo 54'; Jones 70'	Stadium: Rose Bowl; Attendance: 9,113; Referee: Kevin Stott; Assistant referees: Tom Bobadilla; Jorge Reyes

September 10, 1998 29	Chicago Fire	2–3	Dallas Burn	Dallas, Texas
7:00 PM CDT	Klopas (yellow card) 43'; Razov 49'; Wolff 60'; Okaroh (yellow card) 70'; Keller (yellow card) 74'	Report	Kreis 7'; Washington 83'; Rodríguez 90'	Stadium: Cotton Bowl; Attendance: 9,745; Referee: Ali Saheli; Assistant referees: Levon Baladjanian; Misail Tsapos

September 13, 1998 30	San Jose Clash	3–1	Dallas Burn	Dallas, Texas
2:00 CDT	Barrett 25'; Vasquez (yellow card) 31'; Lewis (yellow card) 64'; Draguicevich 67', 73'; Uribe (yellow card) 80'	Report	Deering 19'; Álvarez (yellow card) 54'; Pareja (yellow card) 63'; Dade (yellow card) 85'	Stadium: Cotton Bowl; Attendance: 10,325; Referee: Paul Tamberino; Assistant referees: Arthur Reed; Sergio Vega

September 19, 1998 31	Dallas Burn	1–0	Kansas City Wizards	Kansas City, Missouri
7:30 PM CDT	Kreis 25' (yellow card) 64'; Flores (yellow card) 61'	Report	Vermillion (yellow card) 68'	Stadium: Arrowhead Stadium; Attendance: 13,146; Referee: Brian Hall; Assistant referees: Roger Sill; Roger Itaya

September 26, 1998 32	Dallas Burn	1–3	Colorado Rapids	Denver, Colorado
7:00 PM MDT	Flores (yellow card) 50'; Rodríguez 57'; Álvarez (yellow card) 64'	Report	Balboa 2', 16'; Waldir 32'; Vaudreuil (yellow card) 81'	Stadium: Mile High Stadium; Attendance: 15,022; Referee: Sandra Hunt; Assistant referees: Paul Tamberino; Kari Seitz

== Playoffs ==
=== Western Conference semifinals ===
October 1, 1998 Game 1	Dallas Burn	1–6	Los Angeles Galaxy	Pasadena, California
7:00 PM PDT	Washington 47'; Pollard (yellow card) 85'	Report	Peña 10', 69'; Hermosillo 16', 32'; Cienfuegos 20'; Franchino (yellow card) 24'; Wélton 41'	Stadium: Rose Bowl; Attendance: 10,047; Referee: Ted Covaciu-Woods; Assistant referees: Andrew Barnes; Sandra Hunt

October 4, 1998 Game 2	Los Angeles Galaxy	3–2	Dallas Burn	Dallas, Texas
2:00 PM CDT	Jones (yellow card) 7'; Fraser (yellow card) 13'; Machón (yellow card) 34'; Caligiuri (yellow card) 51' (goal) 85'; Peña (yellow card) 56'; Hendrickson 80'; Mathis 88'	Report	Eck (yellow card) 43'; Haynes 44'; Kreis 48'; Pareja (yellow card) 56'	Stadium: Cotton Bowl; Attendance: 8,130; Referee: Brian Hall; Assistant referees: Greg Barkey; Chip Reed

== U.S. Open Cup ==
July 8, 1998 Third Round	Orange County Zodiac (California)	0–4	(Texas) Dallas Burn	Duncanville, Texas
	Hesse (yellow card) 24'; Patterson (yellow card) 82'	Report	Farrer (yellow card) 33'; Lak 43' (o.g.); Suarez 50'; Kreis 57'; Sastoque 78'	Stadium: Old Panther Field; Attendance: 600; Referee: Ali Saheli; Assistant referees: Misail Tsapos; Troy Travis

July 22, 1998 Quarterfinal	Nashville Metros (Tennessee)	1–5	(Texas) Dallas Burn	Dallas, Texas
8:30 PM CDT	Jones 87'	Report	Washington 9', 53'; Trotman 48'; Suarez 78'; Farrer 81'	Stadium: Cotton Bowl; Attendance: 3,812; Referee: Gerry Corrie; Assistant referees: Roger Sill; Richard Triche

August 4, 1998 Semifinal	Dallas Burn (Texas)	2–3	(Illinois) Chicago Fire	Metarie, Louisiana
8:30 PM CDT	Trotman 23'; Kreis (red card) 52'; Alvarez 83' (pen.)	Report	Razov 11'; Gutiérrez (yellow card) 40' (red card) 66'; Okaroh (yellow card) 45'; Kosecki 56' (yellow card) 71' (red card); Kubík 74'	Stadium: Zephyr Field; Attendance: 6,514; Referee: Rich Grady; Assistant referees: Andrew Barnes; Misail Tsapos
