= 1992 American Professional Soccer League =

American Professional Soccer League
- Season: 1992
- Champions: Colorado Foxes (1st Title)
- Premiers: Colorado Foxes (1st Title)
- Matches: 40
- Goals: 129 (3.23 per match)
- Best Player: (Guinea) Taifour Diané, Colorado Foxes
- Top goalscorer: (United States) Jean Harbor, Tampa Bay Rowdies (13 goals)
- Best goalkeeper: (United States) Mark Dodd, Colorado Foxes

The 1992 American Professional Soccer League season was the 3rd season of the American Professional Soccer League. Only five out of nine teams that competed in 1991 returned for this season.

== Regular season ==
Teams played four games against each opponent for a total of 16 games. The following point system was used:

- Win: 6 points
- Shoot out win: 4 points
- Shoot out loss: 2 points
- 1 bonus point per goal scored in regulation, maximum of 3 per game

Rank	Team	GP	W	L	WN	WE	WS	LN	LE	LS	GF	GA	GD	Pts
1	Colorado Foxes	16	11	5	10	0	1	5	0	0	26	18	+8	89
2	Tampa Bay Rowdies	16	10	6	8	1	1	4	1	1	34	25	+9	87
3	San Francisco Bay Blackhawks	16	8	8	6	0	2	6	0	2	27	25	+2	73
4	Fort Lauderdale Strikers	16	7	9	4	2	1	8	0	1	25	23	+2	61
5	Miami Freedom	16	4	12	4	0	0	9	2	1	17	38	-21	43

== Playoffs ==
=== Bracket ===
Semifinals
1	Colorado Foxes	2(2)
4	Fort Lauderdale Strikers	2(1)
2	Tampa Bay Rowdies	2
3	San Francisco Bay Blackhawks	1

1992 APSL Final
1	Colorado Foxes	1
2	Tampa Bay Rowdies	0

=== Semifinal 1 ===
September 11, 1992
8:00 PM EST

Tampa Bay Rowdies (FL)	2–1	San Francisco Bay Blackhawks (CA)
Chris Charles (yellow card) 34:51'; Jean Harbor 53:34' (pen.); Kevin Sloan (yellow card) 75:48'; Jean Harbor 75:48' (McGeough)	Report	32:35' (pen.) Dominic Kinnear; (yellow card) 78:58' Lawrence Lozzano

Tampa Stadium, Tampa, Florida
Attendance: 1,877
Referee: Paul Tamberino (USA)

=== Semifinal 2 ===
September 12, 1992

Colorado Foxes (CO)	2–2 (a.e.t.)	Fort Lauderdale Strikers (FL)
Shawn Medved 5:11' (Hooker); Jeff Hooker 52:30' (pen.)	Report	44:30' Eric Eichmann; 72:15' Miguel Muchotrigo (Gregoire)
Penalties
? (penalty missed) ? (penalty missed) ? (penalty missed) ? (penalty missed); Kim Roentved (penalty scored); Tom Soehn (penalty scored)	2–1	(penalty missed) ? (penalty missed) ? (penalty missed) ? (penalty scored) Eric Eichmann; (penalty missed) Gerard Gregorie; (penalty missed) Jean Derivois

Englewood High School, Englewood, Colorado
Attendance: 3,801
Referee: (USA)

=== Final ===
September 26, 1992
6:05 PM MST

Colorado Foxes (CO)	1–0	Tampa Bay Rowdies (FL)
Chad Ashton 33:42'	Report 1 Report 2	Terry Rowe (yellow card) 17:55'; Tommy Reasoner (yellow card) 44:05'

Englewood High School
Englewood, Colorado
Attendance: 4,659
Referee: Raul Dominguez (USA)

Colorado	Tampa Bay

==== Match statistics ====
Statistic	Colorado	Tampa Bay
Goals scored	1	0
Total shots	20	7
Shots on target	6	4
Saves	4	5
Corner kicks	7	2
Fouls	10	11
Yellow cards	0	2
Red cards	0	0

== Professional Cup ==
All five APSL teams took part in the Professional Cup, along with two teams from the Canadian Soccer League and one from the National Professional Soccer League. Just as they would in the APSL Final a week later, Colorado defeated Tampa Bay. This combination, along with winning the 1992 APSL regular season, gave the Foxes a treble.

=== Professional Cup Final ===
September 19, 1992
8:00 pm MDT

Colorado Foxes (United States)	4–1	(United States) Tampa Bay Rowdies
Hooker 12:01'; Haynes 15:48'; Diané 39:30' (Santel); Eck 89:25' (Roentved)	Report 1 Report 2 Report 3	Harbor 77:48' (Rowe)

Englewood Stadium, Englewood, Colorado
Attendance: 3,507

== Points leaders ==
Rank	Scorer	Club	Goals	Assists	Points
1	(United States) Jean Harbor	Tampa Bay Rowdies	13	4	30
2	(Guinea) Taifour Diané	Colorado Foxes	10	3	23
3	(United States) Kevin Sloan	Tampa Bay Rowdies	7	6	20
4	(United States) Eric Eichmann	Fort Lauderdale Strikers	7	3	17
5	(United States) Philip Gyau	Tampa Bay Rowdies	7	2	16
6	(England) Steve Kinsey	Fort Lauderdale Strikers	7	1	15
7	(United States) Chad Ashton	Colorado Foxes	4	5	13
8	(Jamaica) Peter Isaacs	San Francisco Bay Blackhawks	5	2	12
9	(Liberia) Zico Doe	Miami Freedom	4	3	11
10	(United States) Mike Masters	San Francisco Bay Blackhawks	4	2	10
11	(Trinidad and Tobago) Brian Haynes	Colorado Foxes	2	6	10

== Honors ==
- MVP: (Guinea) Taifour Diané
- Leading goal scorer: (United States) Jean Harbor
- Leading goalkeeper: (United States) Mark Dodd
- Rookie of the Year: (Guinea) Taifour Diané
- Coach of the Year: (England) Ricky Hill

=== All-League Best XI ===
First Team	Position	Second Team
(United States) Bill Andracki, Tampa Bay	G	(United States) Mark Dodd, Colorado
(United States) Steve Pittman, Fort Lauderdale	D	(United States) John Doyle, San Francisco
(United States) Robin Fraser, Colorado	D	(United States) Troy Edwards, Fort Lauderdale
(United States) Steve Trittschuh, Tampa Bay	D	(Nigeria) Derek Van Rheenen, San Francisco
(United States) Danny Pena, San Francisco	D	(United States) Arturo Velazco, Miami
(England) Ricky Hill, Tampa Bay	M	(United States) Chad Ashton, Colorado
(El Salvador) Jorge Salazar, San Francisco	M	(Uruguay) Diego Mandagaran, Miami
(United States) Dominic Kinnear, San Francisco	M	(Denmark) Kim Roentved, Colorado
(United States) Kevin Sloan, Tampa Bay	M	(United States) Ted Eck, Colorado
(Guinea) Taifour Diané, Colorado	F	(Liberia) Zico Doe, Miami
(United States) Jean Harbor, Tampa Bay	F	(Jamaica) Peter Isaacs, San Francisco
