= 1993 American Professional Soccer League =

American Professional Soccer League
- Season: 1993
- Champions: Colorado Foxes (2nd Title)
- Premiers: Vancouver 86ers (1st Title)
- 1994 CONCACAF Champions' Cup: Los Angeles Salsa
- Matches: 84
- Goals: 279 (3.32 per match)
- Best Player: (Brazil) Paulinho, Los Angeles Salsa
- Top goalscorer: (Brazil) Paulinho, Los Angeles Salsa (15 goals)
- Best goalkeeper: (United States) Jim St. Andre, Colorado Foxes

The 1993 American Professional Soccer League season was the 4th season of the American Professional Soccer League. Seven teams competed this season including four expansion teams and three teams returning from 1992.

== History ==
In 1993, the league added three teams from Canada. The Canadian Soccer League had collapsed at the end of the 1992 season and the Vancouver 86ers and Toronto Blizzard along with a new club the Montreal Impact moved to the APSL. Vancouver topped the regular season standings, but fell in the playoff semifinals to the Los Angeles Salsa. In the other semifinal, the Colorado Foxes defeated the Tampa Bay Rowdies.

Although the Foxes had a better record than the Salsa, the championship game took place in Los Angeles because the Foxes did not have an available home stadium. Their home venue at Englewood High School was planned to host a homecoming football game on the same day and an alternative venue, the Brooks Field in Golden, Colorado, was secured too late. The Foxes attempted unsuccessfully to move the championship to a neutral-site venue in Vancouver.

In 1993 before the USSF chose MLS as Division 1, a couple teams had significant capital backing, had local TV and radio deals, and many of the players were US national team hopefuls or Canadian internationals.

== Regular season ==
The competition was a single table on the league principle with a balanced schedule home and away where each of the seven teams plays the other six four times. The league's regular season was played over twenty weeks, beginning April 30 and concluding September 12. The top four in the table qualified for a single-elimination tournament held in September. The league was a generally close competition, given the points system adopted all teams were still in the playoff race into early August or about 70% of the season. The points system included 6 points for a win, 4 points for a shootout win, 2 points for a shootout loss, and bonus points for goals to a maximum of three. If the game was tied, then instead of following FIFA rules of two 15-minute extra halves followed by penalty kicks, the APSL did two 7.5 minute extra halves followed by the NASL shootout. The shootout consisted of the player starting 35 yards from the net, goalkeeper in net, and five seconds for the player to score (essentially a timed five second break-away skills competition). Game day rosters had to have eleven of the eighteen as domestic players.

| Rank | Team | GP | W | L | WN | WE | WS | LN | LE | LS | GF | GA | GD | Pts |
|---|---|---|---|---|---|---|---|---|---|---|---|---|---|---|
| 1 | Vancouver 86ers | 24 | 15 | 9 | 11 | 2 | 2 | 8 | 0 | 1 | 43 | 35 | +8 | 126 |
| 2 | Colorado Foxes (C) | 24 | 15 | 9 | 12 | 0 | 3 | 6 | 3 | 0 | 40 | 34 | +6 | 121 |
| 3 | Tampa Bay Rowdies | 24 | 12 | 12 | 10 | 2 | 0 | 10 | 1 | 1 | 53 | 47 | +6 | 118 |
| 4 | Los Angeles Salsa | 24 | 12 | 12 | 8 | 1 | 3 | 9 | 0 | 3 | 41 | 37 | +4 | 109 |
| 5 | Toronto Blizzard | 24 | 10 | 14 | 8 | 2 | 0 | 11 | 1 | 2 | 35 | 41 | -6 | 97 |
| 6 | Fort Lauderdale Strikers | 24 | 9 | 15 | 8 | 0 | 1 | 11 | 1 | 3 | 39 | 52 | -13 | 94 |
| 7 | Montreal Impact | 24 | 11 | 13 | 9 | 0 | 2 | 11 | 1 | 1 | 28 | 33 | -5 | 90 |

== Playoffs ==
=== Bracket ===
Semifinals
1 | Vancouver 86ers | 2(1)
4 | Los Angeles Salsa | 2(3)
2 | Colorado Foxes | 1
3 | Tampa Bay Rowdies | 0

1993 APSL Final
4 | Los Angeles Salsa | 1
2 | Colorado Foxes | 3

=== Semifinal 1 ===
September 18, 1993
5:05 PM PST

| Vancouver 86ers (BC) | 2–2 | Los Angeles Salsa (CA) |
|---|---|---|
| Domenic Mobilio 41' (pen.); Dale Mitchell 80' | Report | 67' Danny Pena; 90+3' Paulinho |
Penalties
| Carl Valentine (penalty scored); Dale Mitchell (penalty missed); Rick Celebrini (penalty missed); Domenic Mobilio (penalty missed) | 1–3 | (penalty scored) Paul Wright; (penalty scored) Rich Ryerson; (penalty scored) Paulinho; (penalty missed) Thor Lee |

Swangard Stadium, Vancouver, British Columbia
Attendance: 5,027

=== Semifinal 2 ===
September 19, 1993
8:00 PM MST

| Colorado Foxes (CO) | 1–0 | Tampa Bay Rowdies (FL) |
|---|---|---|
| Brian Haynes 74:25' | Report |

Englewood Stadium, Englewood, Colorado
Attendance: 5,005

=== Final ===
October 2, 1993
5:05 PM PST

| Los Angeles Salsa (CA) | 1–3 (a.e.t.) | Colorado Foxes (CO) |
|---|---|---|
| Philip Gyau 67' | Report | Ted Eck 87:38'; Taifour Diané 104:50' (Lipp); Robert Lipp 110' (Diané) |

Titan Stadium, Fullerton, California
Attendance: 10,743

== Points leaders ==
| Rank | Scorer | Club | Goals | Assists | Points |
|---|---|---|---|---|---|
| 1 | (Brazil) Paulinho | Los Angeles Salsa | 15 | 7 | 37 |
| 2 | (United States) Paul Wright | Los Angeles Salsa | 13 | 7 | 30 |
| 3 | (England) Paul Dougherty | Tampa Bay Rowdies | 8 | 11 | 27 |
| 4 | (Liberia) Zico Doe | Fort Lauderdale Strikers | 12 | 2 | 26 |
| 4 | (Canada) Hector Marinaro | Toronto Blizzard | 7 | 12 | 26 |
| 6 | (Guinea) Taifour Diané | Colorado Foxes | 10 | 5 | 25 |
| 6 | (France) Pierre Morice | Tampa Bay Rowdies | 9 | 7 | 25 |
| 8 | (Canada) Domenic Mobilio | Vancouver 86ers | 10 | 3 | 23 |
| 9 | (United States) Scott Benedetti | Colorado Foxes | 10 | 1 | 21 |
| 10 | (Canada) Fernando Aguiar | Toronto Blizzard | 9 | 1 | 19 |
| 10 | (United States) Ted Eck | Colorado Foxes | 8 | 2 | 19 |
| 10 | (Canada) Carlo Corazzin | Vancouver 86ers | 7 | 5 | 19 |
| 13 | (Jamaica) Alvin James | Fort Lauderdale Strikers | 7 | 4 | 18 |
| 13 | (United States) Steve Trittschuh | Tampa Bay Rowdies | 7 | 4 | 18 |
| 15 | (United States) Jean Harbor | Tampa Bay Rowdies | 5 | 7 | 17 |
| 16 | (United States) Brad Smith | Tampa Bay Rowdies | 6 | 4 | 16 |
| 16 | (Fiji) Ivor Evans | Vancouver 86ers | 4 | 8 | 16 |
| 16 | (Canada) Dale Mitchell | Vancouver 86ers | 4 | 8 | 16 |
| 16 | (Argentina) Amadeo Gasparini | Toronto Blizzard | 4 | 8 | 16 |
| 20 | (Canada) Grant Needham | Montreal Impact | 6 | 3 | 15 |
| 21 | (Canada) Eddy Berdusco | Toronto Blizzard | 5 | 3 | 13 |

== Honors ==
- MVP: (Brazil) Paulinho
- Leading goal scorer: (Brazil) Paulinho
- Leading goalkeeper: (United States) Jim St. Andre
- Rookie of the Year: (Canada) Jason De Vos
- Coach of the Year: (Republic of Ireland) Ken Fogarty
- First Team All League
  - Goalkeeper: (Canada) Paul Dolan
  - Defenders: (United States) Robin Fraser, (United States) Danny Pena, (Canada) Mark Watson, (France) Patrice Ferri
  - Midfielders: (Brazil) Paulinho, (Fiji) Ivor Evans, (England) Paul Dougherty, (United States) Ted Eck
  - Forwards: (Guinea) Taifour Diané, (United States) Paul Wright
- Second Team All League
  - Goalkeeper: (United States) Ian Feuer
  - Defenders: (Canada) Jason De Vos, (Canada) Steve MacDonald, (Denmark) Kim Roentved, (United States) Mark Santel
  - Midfielders: (United States) Chad Ashton, (Trinidad and Tobago) Bryan Haynes, (France) Pierre Morice, (United States) Steve Trittschuh
  - Forwards: (Canada) Domenic Mobilio, (Canada) Hector Marinaro
