= 1992 Fort Lauderdale Strikers season =

Fort Lauderdale Strikers
1992 season
- Owner(s): (United States) Joe Robbie; Noel Lemon
- Manager: Thomas Rongen
- Stadium: Lockhart Stadium
- APSL: Fourth place
- APSL playoffs: Semi-finalist
Home colors	Away colors

The 1992 Fort Lauderdale Strikers season was the third season of the team in the American Professional Soccer League. It was the club's twenty-sixth season in professional soccer. This year, the team finished in fourth place in the regular season. They went to the playoffs as a semifinalist.

== Competitions ==
=== APSL regular season ===
Place	Team	GP	W	L	WN	WE	WS	LN	LE	LS	GF	GA	GD	Points
1	Colorado Foxes	16	11	5	10	0	1	5	0	0	26	18	+8	89
2	Tampa Bay Rowdies	16	10	6	8	1	1	4	1	1	34	25	+9	87
3	San Francisco Bay Blackhawks	16	8	8	6	0	2	6	0	2	27	25	+2	73
4	Fort Lauderdale Strikers	16	7	9	4	2	1	8	0	1	25	23	+2	61
5	Miami Freedom	16	4	12	4	0	0	9	2	1	17	38	-21	43

=== APSL Playoffs ===
==== Semifinals ====
September 11, 1992
8:00 PM EST

Tampa Bay Rowdies (FL)	2–1	San Francisco Bay Blackhawks (CA)
Chris Charles (yellow card) 34:51'; Jean Harbor 53:34' (pen.); Kevin Sloan (yellow card) 75:48'; Jean Harbor 75:48' (McGeough)		32:35' (pen.) Dominic Kinnear; (yellow card) 78:58' Lawrence Lozzano

Tampa Stadium, Tampa, Florida
Attendance: 1,877
Referee: Paul Tamberino (USA)
September 12, 1992

Colorado Foxes (CO)	2–2 (a.e.t.)	Fort Lauderdale Strikers (FL)
Shawn Medved 5:11' (Hooker); Jeff Hooker 52:30' (pen.)	Report	44:30' Eric Eichmann; 72:15' Miguel Muchotrigo (Gregoire)
Penalties
? (penalty missed) ? (penalty missed) ? (penalty missed) ? (penalty missed); Kim Roentved (penalty scored); Tom Soehn (penalty scored)	2–1	(penalty missed) ? (penalty missed) ? (penalty missed) ? (penalty scored) Eric Eichmann; (penalty missed) Gerard Gregorie; (penalty missed) Jean Derivois

Englewood High School, Englewood, Colorado
Attendance: 3,801
Referee: (USA)

=== Professional Cup ===
Date	Opponent	Venue	Result	Scorers
August 8, 1992	(United States) Miami Freedom	H	2–1	Eichmann (2)
August 12, 1992	(United States) Miami Freedom	A	3–2	McKinley, Kinsey, Muchotrigo
September 4, 1992	(United States) Tampa Bay Rowdies	A	0–1	
