= Professional Cup =

International Association Football Competition

1992 Professional Cup

Tournament details
- Host country: United States; Canada
- Dates: July 22, 1992 – September 19, 1992
- Teams: 8

Final positions
- Champions: Colorado Foxes (1st title)
- Runners-up: Tampa Bay Rowdies

Tournament statistics
- Matches played: 11
- Goals scored: 37 (3.36 per match)
- Top scorer: (United States) Jean Harbor (5 goals)

The Professional Cup was an international soccer tournament that took place in 1992 and involved eight, professional clubs from three different leagues in North America; the American Professional Soccer League, the Canadian Soccer League, and the National Professional Soccer League. Although it was billed as "inaugural" this would be the only year that the tournament was played.

== Overview ==
The tournament was originally scheduled to be played as a standard two-legged, aggregate format in every round, but after all three of the non-APSL teams were eliminated in the first round it was decided that the remaining rounds would be single match ties. The winning team was to receive approximately $26,800 and the runners-up, about $13,200.

Nine matches, including the Final, were played in the United States, and two matches were played in Canada. The participating teams were APSL sides: Colorado Foxes, Fort Lauderdale Strikers, Miami Freedom, San Francisco Bay Blackhawks, and Tampa Bay Rowdies; CSL sides: Montreal Supra and Vancouver 86ers, as well as the NPSL's Chicago Power. Although up to that point Chicago had been known only as an indoor team, in the summer of 1992 they formed an outdoor squad as well.

Colorado won the Professional Cup Final, 4–1, over Tampa Bay. The Foxes, who had already won the 1992 APSL regular season, would also go on to win the APSL title seven days later, thus completing a minor treble.

== Match results ==
=== Bracket ===
First round
APSL	Colorado Foxes	3	2
CSL	Vancouver 86ers	2	1
APSL	San Francisco Bay Blackhawks	2	3
NPSL	Chicago Power	0	2
APSL	Tampa Bay Rowdies	5	2
CSL	Montreal Supra	1	0
APSL	Fort Lauderdale Strikers	2	3
APSL	Miami Freedom	1	1

Semifinals
APSL	Colorado Foxes	1
APSL	San Francisco Bay Blackhawks	0
APSL	Tampa Bay Rowdies	1
APSL	Fort Lauderdale Strikers	0

Final
APSL	Colorado Foxes	4
APSL	Tampa Bay Rowdies	1

=== First round ===
Team 1	Agg.	Team 2	Game 1	Game 2	Dates • Location • Attendance
Tampa Bay Rowdies (United States)	7–1	(Canada) Montreal Supra	5–1	2–0	August 1 • Tampa Stadium • 600; August 12 • Stade Claude-Robillard • 924
Fort Lauderdale Strikers (United States)	5–2	(United States) Miami Freedom	2–1	3–1	August 8 • Colts Stadium • 1,152; August 12 • Orange Bowl • 85
San Francisco Bay Blackhawks (United States)	5–2	(United States) Chicago Power	2–0	3–2	July 22 • Buck Shaw Stadium • 2,050; August 19 • Norris Stadium • (???)
Colorado Foxes (United States)	5–3	(Canada) Vancouver 86ers	3–2	2–1	August 3 • Englewood Stadium • 368; August 11 • Swangard Stadium • 3,083

=== Semifinals ===
September 4	Tampa Bay Rowdies (United States)	1–0	(United States) Fort Lauderdale Strikers	Tampa, Florida
	Charles (yellow card) 5'; Sloan 82' (Gyau)	Report	Pittman (yellow card) 67'	Stadium: Tampa Stadium; Attendance: 356; Referee: Zim Boules

September 5	Colorado Foxes (United States)	1–0	(United States) San Francisco Bay Blackhawks	Englewood, Colorado
	Diané 56'	Report		Stadium: Englewood Stadium

=== Professional Cup Final ===
September 19, 1992
8:00 pm MDT

Colorado Foxes (United States)	4–1	(United States) Tampa Bay Rowdies
Hooker 13'; Haynes 16'; Diané 40' (Santel); Eck 90' (Roentved)	report 1 report 2 report 3	Harbor 78' (Rowe)

Englewood Stadium, Englewood, Colorado
Attendance: 3,507

1992 Professional Cup Champions: Colorado Foxes

Match Stats	Colorado	Tampa Bay
Goals scored	4	1
Total shots	17	6
Shots on target	8	2
Saves	1	4
