= Englewood High School =

Englewood High School may refer to:

(all in the United States)

- Englewood High School (Colorado),
- Englewood High School (Florida)
- Englewood Technical Prep Academy, Illinois

== See also ==
- Dwight Morrow High School, the comprehensive public high school of Englewood, New Jersey
