= Peter Lak =

American soccer player

Personal information
- Date of birth: April 20, 1973 (age 53)
- Place of birth: Huntington Beach, California, U.S.
- Date of death: 08/08/2024
- Height: 6 ft 2 in (1.88 m)
- Position: Defender

College career
Years	Team	Apps	(Gls)
1991–1992	Cal Poly Pomona Broncos		
1993–1994	Cal State Fullerton Titans		

Senior career*
Years	Team	Apps	(Gls)
1995	Los Angeles Salsa U-23		
1996	Colorado Foxes	11	(0)
1997	Orange County Zodiac	9	(2)
1997	Los Angeles Galaxy	2	(0)
1998–2000	Orange County Zodiac	69	(2)
- * Club domestic league appearances and goals

Peter Lak (born April 20, 1973) is an American retired soccer defender who played professionally in the USISL A-League and Major League Soccer.

== Youth ==
Lak grew up in Huntington Beach, California, graduating from Ocean View High School in 1991. He attended Cal Poly Pomona where he played on the men's soccer team in 1991 and 1992. He transferred to Cal State Fullerton after his sophomore year and played on the Titan's soccer team in 1993 and 1994.

== Professional ==
In 1995, Lak played for the Los Angeles Salsa U-23 in the USISL Pro League. On July 25, 1996, midway through the 1996 A-League season, he joined the Colorado Foxes of the A-League. In 1997, he signed with the Orange County Zodiac which served as the farm team for the Los Angeles Galaxy. On July 3, 1997, the Galaxy called Lak up from the Zodiac. He remained with the Galaxy, playing two games, before being waived on November 14, 1997. In 1998, Lak returned to Orange County and played for them through the 2000 season.
