= Steve Engel (American football) =

American football player (born 1947)

No. 36
- Position: Running back

Personal information
- Born: October 13, 1947 (age 79); Englewood, Colorado, U.S.
- Listed height: 6 ft 1 in (1.85 m)
- Listed weight: 218 lb (99 kg)

Career information
- High school: Englewood (Colorado)
- College: Colorado
- NFL draft: 1970: 5th round, 125th overall pick

Career history
- Cleveland Browns (1970–1971)
- Stats at Pro Football Reference

William Stephen Engel (born October 13, 1947) is an American former professional football running back who played one season with the Cleveland Browns of the National Football League (NFL). He played college football at Colorado.

== Early life and college ==
William Stephen Engel was born on October 13, 1947, in Englewood, Colorado. He attended Englewood High School in Englewood.

Engel played college football for the Colorado Buffaloes of the University of Colorado Boulder. He rushed 21 times for 76 yards in 1967 while also catching four passes for 49 yards. In 1968, he recorded 110 carries for 491 yards and three touchdowns, and seven receptions for 147 yards and one touchdown. Engel rushed ten times for 43 yards in 1969.

== Professional career ==
Engel was selected by the Cleveland Browns in the fifth round, with the 125th overall pick, of the 1970 NFL draft. He played in three games for the Browns during the 1970 season. He had knee surgery in 1970. Engel was on the Browns' taxi squad in 1971.
