= Joey DiGiamarino =

American soccer player

Personal information
- Full name: Joseph Anthony DiGiamarino
- Date of birth: April 6, 1977 (age 49)
- Place of birth: Corona, California, U.S.
- Position: Defender

College career
Years	Team	Apps	(Gls)
1995–1996	Cal State Fullerton Titans		

Senior career*
Years	Team	Apps	(Gls)
1997–2000	Colorado Rapids	67	(7)
1997	→ Colorado Foxes (loan)	10	(2)
2001–2002	Bayer Leverkusen	0	(0)
2003–2004	MetroStars	18	(0)
2004	Colorado Rapids	8	(0)

International career^{‡}
1997	United States U20	15	(2)
2000	United States U23	1	(0)
- * Club domestic league appearances and goals as of July 22, 2008 ‡ National team caps and goals as of July 22, 2008

Joseph Anthony DiGiamarino (born April 6, 1977, in Corona, California) is an American soccer player who last played left defense for the Colorado Rapids of Major League Soccer.

DiGiamarino, nicknamed DiGi, attended Corona High School where he was the 1995 California High School Player of the Year. He played college soccer at Fullerton State, but left it after his sophomore season, becoming one of the early Project-40 signings in MLS history. He was allocated to the Rapids in 1997, but did not see any time with the team that year, instead playing on loan with the Colorado Foxes of the A-League. That year, he also played for the U.S. U-20 national team at the 1997 FIFA World Youth Championship. He played four games as the U.S. went to the Round of 16.

DiGiamarino became a regular with the Rapids in 1998 and played there for three seasons, mostly at left midfield. In 2000, he played for the United States in the Summer Olympics. He left MLS after the year, signing with the Bundesliga club Bayer Leverkusen.

But various injuries and the quality of the Leverkusen squad led to Joey not seeing any playing time in Germany. After two years in career wasteland, he came back to MLS, signing with the MetroStars in 2003. DiGiamarino was waived by them early in 2004, and was picked up by his original team, Colorado. But the Rapids let him go after the year. In five years in the league, DiGiamarino scored seven goals and added eight assists.
