= Mark Dodd =

American soccer player

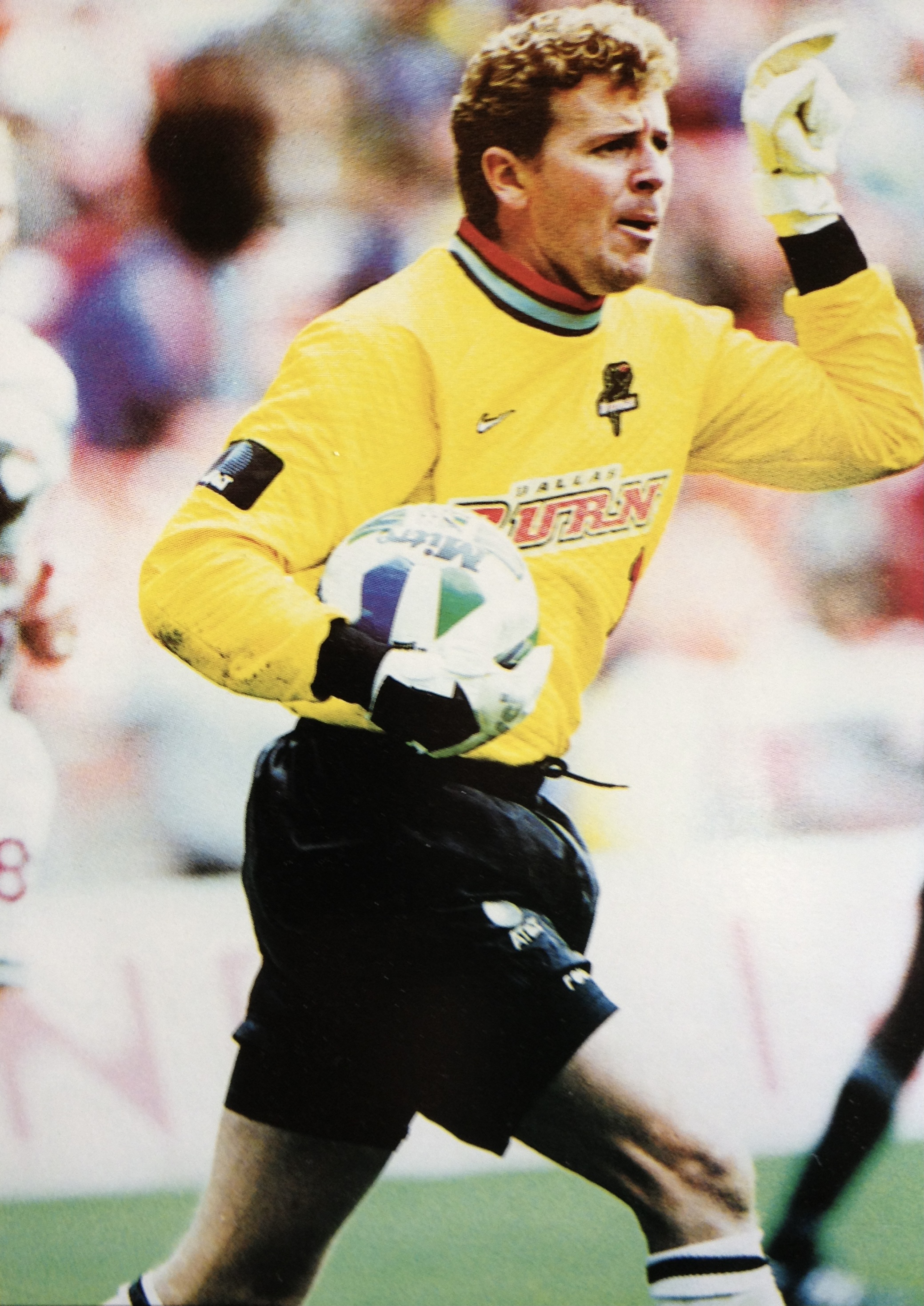
- Dodd with Dallas Burn in 1996

Personal information
- Full name: Mark Dodd
- Date of birth: September 14, 1965 (age 61)
- Place of birth: Dallas, Texas, United States
- Height: 6 ft 2 in (1.88 m)
- Position: Goalkeeper

College career
Years	Team	Apps	(Gls)
1986–1987	Duke Blue Devils		

Senior career*
Years	Team	Apps	(Gls)
1989–1990	Dallas Sidekicks (indoor)	0	(0)
1990–1995	Colorado Foxes		
1996–1999	Dallas Burn	92	(0)

International career
1988–1997	United States	15	(0)
Medal record
Representing United States
Winner	CONCACAF Gold Cup	1991
Men's Soccer
- * Club domestic league appearances and goals

Mark Dodd (born September 14, 1965) is an American former professional soccer player who played as a goalkeeper. Dodd spent one season in the Major Indoor Soccer League, six in the American Professional Soccer League, and four in Major League Soccer with the Dallas Burn. He also earned fifteen caps with the US Men's National Team.

== High school and college ==
Dodd attended Richardson High School, graduating in 1984. He then attended TCU in 1985 then Duke University in 1986 for one year, then transferred to Duke University in 1985, where he played college soccer. He became first-team goalkeeper in 1986 and backstopped them to the NCAA Championship. It was Duke's first national championship in any sport.

== Playing career ==
=== MISL and APSL ===
Following the completion of his collegiate career, Dodd signed with the Dallas Sidekicks of the MISL. In 1990, Dodd signed with the Colorado Foxes of the American Professional Soccer League. This was the first year of the APSL, which was formed by the merger of the Western Soccer League and the American Soccer League. Dodd was named APSL West Player of the Year and a first team All-Star. In 1992 and 1993, the Foxes won back-to-back APSL championships with Dodd in goal.

=== Major League Soccer ===
The Dallas Burn of Major League Soccer selected Dodd in the 6th round (53rd overall) of the 1996 MLS Inaugural Player Draft. Dodd was the team's starting keeper. He played in 31 games in the Burn's inaugural season and was named MLS's first Goalkeeper of the Year. Dodd helped lead the Burn to the 1997 US Open Cup Championship where he was chosen as the game's MVP. He played four seasons for Dallas, setting numerous team and league records. Dodd also made consecutive trips to the MLS All-Star game, as well as being named to the MLS Best XI.

Six games into the 1999 season, Dodd tore ligaments in his hand. He had surgery on his right hand in February 2000 and retired soon after.

=== International ===
Dodd collected fifteen caps with the U.S. national team, his first coming in 1988 against Guatemala and his last against China in 1997. Throughout his US National Team goalkeeping career, he earned seven shutouts and also held a US National Team record for most consecutive shutout minutes. Dodd was named an alternate on the 1998 World Cup team.

== Honors ==
=== Duke University ===
- NCAA National Champions: 1986

=== Colorado Foxes ===
- APSL Champions: 1992, 1993

=== Dallas Burn ===
- U.S. Open Cup: 1997

=== United States ===
- CONCACAF Gold Cup: 1991

=== Individual ===
- MLS Goalkeeper of the Year: 1996
- MLS Best XI: 1996
- MLS All-Star: 1996, 1997

Preceded by Inaugural	MLS Goalkeeper of the Year; 1996	Succeeded by Brad Friedel
