= Ivor Evans (footballer, born 1966) =

Fijian retired midfielder

Personal information
- Date of birth: 23 January 1966 (age 60)
- Place of birth: Labasa, Fiji
- Position: Midfielder

Senior career*
Years	Team	Apps	(Gls)
–1986	Labasa		
1986–1987	Ba		
1987	St. Louis Steamers		
1987–1995, 1997	Vancouver 86ers	221	(47)
1991	→Nadi F.C.		
1995–	Richmond FC Olympics		
–2007	Tanoa		
2008	Bilolevu		

International career
1985	Fiji Under-20	4	(2)
1985–1988	Fiji	5	(0)
- * Club domestic league appearances and goals

Ivor Evans (born 23 January 1966) is a Fijian former professional footballer who played as a midfielder.

== Club career ==
Ivor Evans started his career in his hometown team Labasa F.C., and then he played for Fiji giants Ba F.C. In 1987, he arrived in North America. Primarily he got a brief spell with MISL team St. Louis Steamers, but he didn't play any match. Next he was selected by Vancouver 86ers in an open trial. He has been playing during his career for Vancouver 86ers, in Canadian Soccer League, in American Professional Soccer League and in the A-League from 1987 to 1997. He played 221 matches and scored 47 goal for Vancouver 86ers.

In 1991, he had a brief spell with Fijian side Nadi F.C. From 1995/1996 season, while playing for Vancouver 86ers in A-League, Ivor Evans started to play also for Richmond Rangers FC, an Indo-Canadian team of the Vancouver Metro Soccer League, an amateur league operating in British Columbia, primarily in the Lower Mainland area.

Afterwards Ivor Evans has played in FSLGV, a soccer league of the Fijian Community in Vancouver, for Tanoa and Bilolevu. In April 2008, 17, while playing for Bilolevu, he has been disqualified for 3 years until 2011.

=== Honors ===
Ivor was named twice in the CSL All-Star team in 1990 and in 1991, and once in APSL All-Star Team in 1993.

== International career ==
He has represented the under-20 Fiji national football team in 1985 in the Oceania U-20 Youth Cup. He played 4 matches and scored twice, and he was sent-off in the fourth match against Taiwan.

In June 1985 he has played with the senior national team in three friendly matches against New Zealand. Ivor played twice in the 1990 FIFA World Cup qualifiers in the knockout matches against Australia. Surprisingly Fiji won the home match 1–0, but lost the return match 5–1 (5–2 on aggregate) and didn't advance to the next round.

== Career statistics ==
Club	Year	League	Apps	Goals
Vancouver 86ers	1987	CSL		
Vancouver 86ers	1988	CSL		9
Vancouver 86ers	1989	CSL		
Vancouver 86ers	1990	CSL		8
Vancouver 86ers	1991	CSL		
Vancouver 86ers	1992	CSL		
Vancouver 86ers	1993	APSL	23	4
Vancouver 86ers	1994	APSL		1
Vancouver 86ers	1995	A-League		
Vancouver 86ers	1997	A-League		

== Bio ==
Ivor's son, whose name is also Ivor, was a youth player of Vancouver Whitecaps FC.
