= Nancy Lay-McCormick =

American soccer player (born 1962)

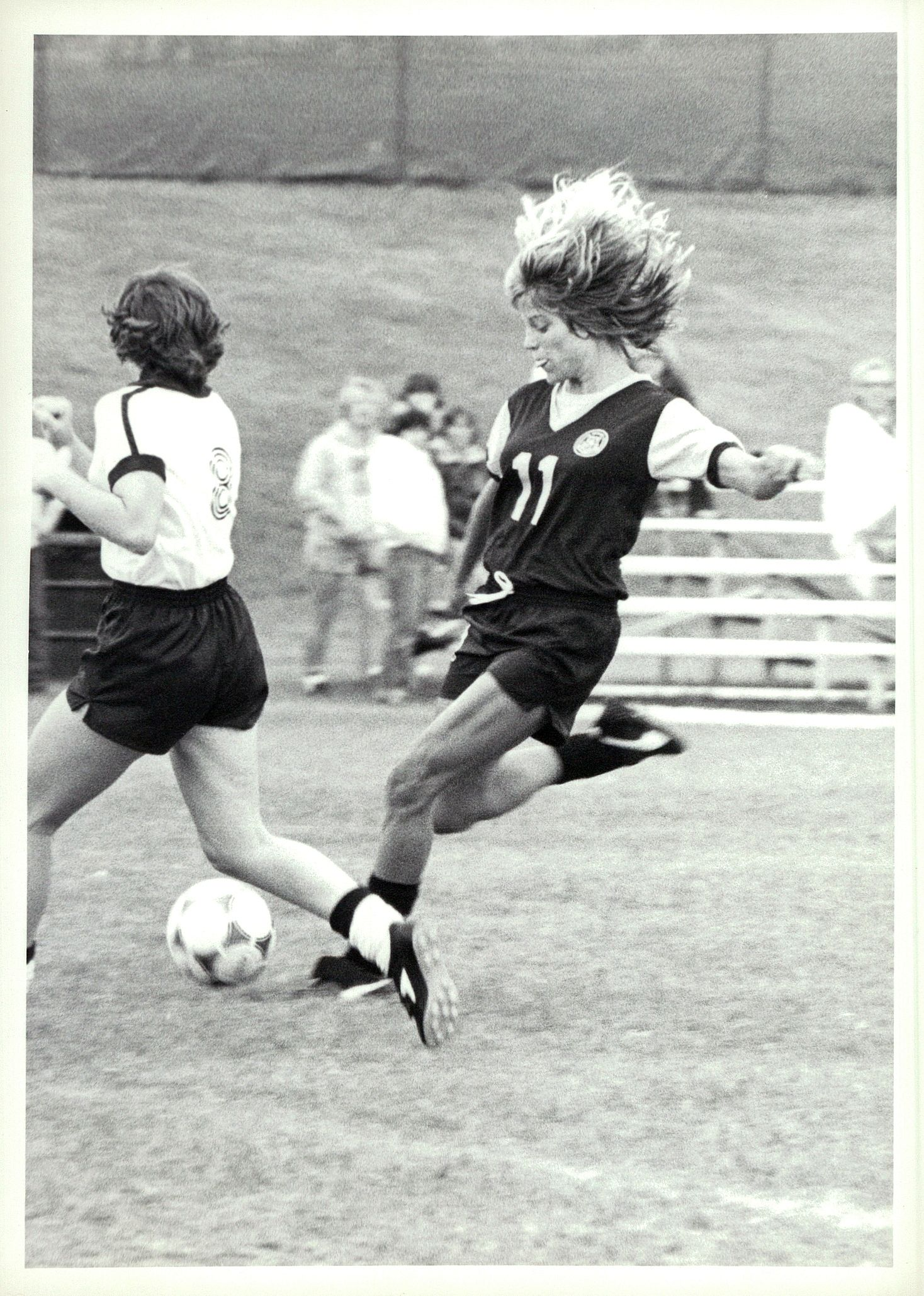
- Born: April 27, 1962 (age 64)

Domestic
Years	League	Role
1990–2002	NISOA	Referee
1997–2001	USSF	Referee
1998	A-League	Referee
1998	MLS	Assistant
1998	MLS	Referee
2001	WUSA	Referee

International
Years	League	Role
1999–2000	FIFA listed	Referee
Soccer playing career
- Height: 5 ft 9 in (1.75 m)
- Position: Forward
Youth career
- Trammell Crow Blazers
- –1980: Parkway North Vikings (boys)
College career
Years	Team	Apps	(Gls)
1981–1982	UCF Knights		
Senior career*
Years	Team	Apps	(Gls)
- J.B. Marine
- Busch
1983	St. Louis Soccer Dome		
- Northern Virginia TBA
Managerial career
- 1984: Lake Brantley Patriots
- Villa Duchesne Saints
- Pacific Indians
- Clearwater Tornadoes
- * Club domestic league appearances and goals

Nancy Lay-McCormick (née Lay; born April 27, 1962) is a St. Louis Soccer Hall of Fame inductee (2016) and the first woman, along with Sandra Hunt, to referee in the MLS in 1998. She was an ambidextrous soccer player who played forward at the University of Central Florida from 1981 to 1982. She was a leading goal scorer and an All-American. She also played for Senior League teams J.B. Marine, Trammell Crow, TBA, and Busch, winning state, regional, and national championships.

== Progression into sports ==
After completing high school, Lay-McCormick moved on to college where she started out at the University of Missouri for her freshman year. The University of Central Florida then offered Nancy a scholarship for soccer which she accepted. While playing for the UCF Knights from 1981 to 1982, Lay-McCormick played in two National Finals including the AIWA and the first NCAA Women's Soccer Finals, and was an All-American. Lay-McCormick received her bachelor’s degree in Health and Physical Education.

== Career ==
In 1985 Lay-McCormick started her career in refereeing. After over a thousand games as the senior referee Lay-McCormick became the first woman to referee in the MLS (Dallas VS New York in Dallas, Texas on August 29, 1998), developed the Women Referee Academy for US Soccer (which developed officials for women at the National Veteran’s Cup), and developed the Florida State Referee Teaching Association. She also coached for Villa Duchesne, Pacific High School, Clearwater High School, as well as boys and girls in Olympic development in Georgia and Virginia.
