= Scott Munson =

Canadian soccer player

Personal information
- Date of birth: 3 January 1970 (age 56)
- Position: Forward

Senior career*
Years	Team	Apps	(Gls)
1991	Kitchener Kickers	25	(5)
1993–1994	Vancouver 86ers	6	(4)

International career
1990–1992	Canada U23	21	(10)
1991	Canada	3	(0)
- * Club domestic league appearances and goals

Scott Munson (born 3 January 1970) is a Canadian former international soccer player, who participated at the 1991 CONCACAF Gold Cup. He played with the Kitchener Kickers and Vancouver 86ers.
