= Jorge Flores (soccer) =

American soccer player

Personal information
- Date of birth: February 12, 1977 (age 49)
- Place of birth: Los Angeles, California, United States
- Height: 5 ft 8 in (1.73 m)
- Position: Midfielder

Senior career*
Years	Team	Apps	(Gls)
1996–1999	Dallas Burn	34	(2)
1999	→ Boston Bulldogs (loan)	1	(0)
1999	→ MLS Pro 40 (loan)	2	(0)

International career
1993	United States U17		
1996–1997	United States U20		
1996	United States	1	(0)
- * Club domestic league appearances and goals

Jorge Flores (born February 13, 1977) is an American former soccer midfielder who spent four seasons with the Dallas Burn in Major League Soccer. He was a member of the U.S. teams at the 1993 FIFA U-17 World Championship and 1997 FIFA World Youth Championship.

== Club ==
Flores attended Paramount High School in Paramount, California, graduating in 1994. He was an outstanding youth soccer player. In February 1996, the Dallas Burn selected Flores in the 11th round (103rd overall) of the 1996 MLS Inaugural Player Draft. He became a starter with the Burn while continuing to play for the youth national teams. In 1998, he saw limited time due to a stress fracture. In 1999, he played one game for the Boston Bulldogs in the USL A-League and two on loan to the MLS Pro 40. The Burn released him in 2000.

== International ==
In 1993, Flores played every minute for the United States U-17 men's national soccer team at the 1993 FIFA U-17 World Championship. In 1997, he was a member of the United States U-20 men's national soccer team which went to the second round of the 1997 FIFA World Youth Championship. On October 16, 1996, Flores played the first half in the United States men's national soccer team loss to Peru.
