= Chad Ashton =

American soccer player and coach

Personal information
- Date of birth: October 26, 1967 (age 59)
- Place of birth: Denver, Colorado, United States
- Height: 5 ft 9 in (1.75 m)
- Position: Midfielder

College career
Years	Team	Apps	(Gls)
1986–1989	North Carolina Tar Heels		

Senior career*
Years	Team	Apps	(Gls)
1990–1994	Colorado Foxes		
1990–1991	Kansas City Comets (indoor)	44	(9)
1992–1993	Denver Thunder (indoor)	35	(33)
1993–1994	Milwaukee Wave (indoor)	32	(24)
1994–1998	Wichita Wings (indoor)	96	(65)
1996	Dallas Burn	23	(1)
1997	Colorado Foxes	27	(6)

Managerial career
- 1995: Denver Pioneers
- 1998–2006: Denver Pioneers
- 2007–2022: D.C. United (assistant)
- 2020: D.C. United (interim)
- 2022: D.C. United (interim)
- * Club domestic league appearances and goals

Chad Ashton (born October 26, 1967, in Denver, Colorado) is an American former soccer midfielder who spent one season in Major League Soccer, four in the American Professional Soccer League, six in the National Professional Soccer League and one in the Major Indoor Soccer League. He coached for ten years at the collegiate level and as assistant coach of D.C. United.

== Youth ==
Ashton grew up in Colorado, earning 1986 Colorado high school player of the year recognition (Iver C. Ranum High School). He then attended the University of North Carolina at Chapel Hill where he played on the men's soccer team from 1986 to 1989. Over his four-year career, he scored 20 goals and added 43 assists in 89 games. He was 1987, 1988 and 1989 second team All Atlantic Coast Conference. He is the team's all-time career assists leader.

== Professional ==
In 1990, Ashton signed with the Colorado Foxes of the American Professional Soccer League. The Foxes won the 1992 and 1993 APSL championship. He was the MVP of the 1993 APSL title game. In October 1990, the Milwaukee Wave selected Ashton in the third round of the National Professional Soccer League draft. However, the Kansas City Comets selected Ashton in the first round of the Major Indoor Soccer League draft and he signed with them. Ashton signed with the Denver Thunder in the National Professional Soccer League. The team folded following the season. At some point, he played for the Colorado Comets in the USISL. In the fall of 1993, he signed with the Milwaukee Wave in the NPSL The next season, he moved to the Wichita Wings. He saw time in only one game, but rebounded with twenty games during the 1995–1996 season. He continued to play the winter indoor season with the Wings through the 1997–1998 season. In February 1996, the Dallas Burn selected Ashton in the 2nd round (18th overall) of the 1996 MLS Supplemental Draft. He played twenty-three games, scoring one goal. In the spring of 1997, he returned to the Colorado Foxes for one more season.

== Coach ==
In 1995, the University of Denver hired Ashton as head coach of its men's soccer team. He took the team to a 9–8–2 season, but left the school to pursue his MLS career. In 1998, he returned to the University of Denver. During his ten seasons as head coach of the University of Denver, he compiled a record of 85–85–14. He was the 2004 and 2006 Mountain Pacific Sports Federation Coach of the Year.

On January 17, 2007, D.C. United hired Ashton as an assistant coach. In addition to his first team duties, he coached the United reserve team. For 13 years, Ashton served as an assistant coach under three different coaches for United: Tom Soehn, Curt Onalfo, and Ben Olsen. On October 8, 2020, Ashton became D.C. United's interim head coach after the departure of Olsen. On April 20, 2022, Ashton once again became D.C. United's interim head coach following the departure of Hernán Losada.
