= Ted Eck =

American soccer player and coach

Personal information
- Date of birth: July 14, 1966 (age 60)
- Place of birth: Springfield, Illinois, United States
- Height: 6 ft 1 in (1.85 m)
- Positions: Forward; midfielder

College career
Years	Team	Apps	(Gls)
1984–1987	Western Illinois Leathernecks		

Senior career*
Years	Team	Apps	(Gls)
1988–1991	Kansas City Comets (indoor)	101	(38)
1989	Ottawa Intrepid	26	(21)
1990-1991	Toronto Blizzard	35	(19)
1991–1992	St. Louis Storm (indoor)	37	(31)
1992–1993	Denver Thunder (indoor)	9	(10)
1993–1994	St. Louis Ambush (indoor)	17	(18)
1992–1996	Colorado Foxes	15+	(2+)
1995–1996	Wichita Wings(indoor)	39	(50)
1996–2001	Dallas Burn	170	(12)
2000–2001	→ Dallas Sidekicks (loan)	5	(1)

International career
1989–1996	United States	13	(1)

Managerial career
- 2009: Ogden Outlaws
Medal record
Representing United States
Winner	CONCACAF Gold Cup	1991
Men's Soccer
- * Club domestic league appearances and goals

Ted Eck (born July 14, 1966, in Springfield, Illinois) is an American former soccer player who played for numerous clubs in the United States and Canada over a thirteen-year professional career. He is a former assistant coach with Real Salt Lake in Major League Soccer. He also earned thirteen caps with the U.S. national team between 1989 and 1996.

He coached the Ogden Outlaws in the Premier Development League.

== Youth and college ==
Eck was born and raised in Springfield, Illinois, where he attended Sacred Heart-Griffin High School. After graduating, he then attended Western Illinois University where he played as a forward on the men's soccer team from 1984 to 1987. He was named the 1987 Mid Continent Conference Player of the Year.

== Early career ==
In 1988, Eck began an itinerant career when he signed with the Kansas City Comets of Major Indoor Soccer League (MISL). He played with the team through the end of the 1990–1991 season when the team folded. In 1989, Eck also played outdoor soccer during the MISL off season with the Ottawa Intrepid of the Canadian Soccer League (CSL). His twenty-one goals with the Intrepid were best in the CSL and earned Eck a spot on the CSL All-Star team. Eck returned to the CSL, this time with the Toronto Blizzard in 1991. That year Eck scored ten goals, tied for fourth on the league's goals list. The Blizzard made it to the CSL championship before losing to the Vancouver 86ers.

With the demise of the Comets, Eck moved to the St. Louis Storm, also of MISL, for the 1991–1992 season. However, the Storm also folded at the end of the season and Eck moved to the Denver Thunder, an expansion team which lasted only the 1992–1993 season before folding. Eck found some outdoor stability in 1992 when he signed with the Colorado Foxes of the American Professional Soccer League (APSL). He would play each summer with the Foxes until he left to join the Dallas Burn in 1996. While with the Foxes, Eck won the APSL championship in 1992 and 1993, as well as the 1992 Professional Cup. Eck scored in the 90th minute of the Foxes 4–1 Pro Cup final victory over Tampa Bay. The 1993 APSL title game pitted the Foxes against the Los Angeles Salsa. Scoreless through most of the game, Philip Gyau of the Salsa scored in the sixty-seventh minute. The Salsa held that lead until Eck tied it with only three minutes left. The Foxes then put two more into the goal in extra time to win 3–1. Eck's goal gave him eight on the season and a spot on the APSL First XI. Eck again earned a spot on the APSL First XI in 1994 with six goals. However, this year the Foxes fell to the Montreal Impact in the title game.

While Eck continued to play for the Foxes each summer, he spent the indoor season with the St. Louis Ambush of the National Professional Soccer League (NPSL) in the 1993–1994 season. That season the Ambush made it to the championship series before losing to the Cleveland Crunch. The next season found Eck with the Wichita Wings. He stayed with this team until joining the Burn in 1996. Eck had his greatest success indoors in his last season with the Wings when he was named the MVP of the NPSL All-Star Game.

== MLS ==
On December 13, 1995, Major League Soccer announced it had signed Eck for the upcoming MLS draft. When the draft was held, the Dallas Burn selected Eck in the first round (third overall). In 1997, he was a member of the Burn team which won the U.S. Open Cup. At the end of the 2000 MLS season, the Burn loaned Eck to the Dallas Sidekicks of the World Indoor Soccer League (WISL). He played only five games with the Sidekicks, scoring a single playoff goal. He returned to the Burn for the 2001 MLS season and was released in August. In 2001, he retired from playing professionally.

== National team ==
Between 1989 and 1996, Eck was a fringe player on the U.S. national team. During those seven years, he earned thirteen caps and scored one goal. His first cap came in a scoreless tie with Guatemala on October 8, 1989, when he came in for Bruce Murray. He again came in for Murray a month later in a victory over Bermuda. He continued to play sporadically in 1990, earning four caps, three as a substitute. However, his greatest contribution to the national team came when he scored in a 2–1 loss to East Germany on July 28, 1990. His appearances dropped after that and he earned only one cap as a substitute in 1992. It was another four years before he was called up for a national team game. He earned his last cap on October 16, 1996. The national team had gone on strike in a contract dispute with USSF and the Federation was forced to field an ad hoc team for that date. Eck and his teammates lost 4–1 to Peru.

== Futsal ==
Eck used his extensive indoor soccer experience to carve out a significant role in the U.S. Futsal Team. Between 1992 and 1999, he earned fourteen caps with the team, scoring ten goals. He was part of the U.S. team which took second place, losing 4–1 to Brazil, in the 1992 FIFA Futsal World Championship. He scored three goals in that tournament.
