= Jeff Hooker =

American soccer player and coach

Personal information
- Date of birth: March 21, 1965 (age 61)
- Place of birth: United States
- Height: 6 ft 0 in (1.83 m)
- Position: Forward

College career
Years	Team	Apps	(Gls)
1983–1987	UCLA Bruins		

Senior career*
Years	Team	Apps	(Gls)
1986	San Diego Nomads		
1988–1989	Los Angeles Heat		
1991–1995	Colorado Foxes		
1997	Colorado Foxes	3	(0)

International career
1983	United States U-20	3	(1)
1984–1987	United States	12	(1)

Managerial career
- 1996–1997: Denver Pioneers men
- 1992–2022: Denver Pioneers women
- * Club domestic league appearances and goals

Jeff Hooker (born March 21, 1965) is a retired U.S. soccer forward who coached the University of Denver women's soccer team. Hooker earned twelve caps, scoring one goal, with the U.S. national team between 1984 and 1987 and was a member of the 1984 U.S. Olympic soccer team. He played professionally in the Western Soccer Alliance and American Professional Soccer League.

== Playing ==
=== High school and college ===
Hooker attended Walnut High School in Walnut, California where he played on the school's boys soccer team. He is tied for fifth on the California state high school list for most assists in a season (44 assists in 1982–1983). Hooker attended and played soccer at UCLA for three seasons between 1983 and 1987. He played as a freshman, but redshirted the 1984 season to play for the U.S. in the 1984 Summer Olympics. He was injured in 1985 while playing with the national team and did not play for UCLA during the school's run to the NCAA championship. He finally got back on the field for UCLA in 1986. In 1987, he played his last season for UCLA, but did not complete his bachelor's degree until 1992. Over his three seasons with the Bruins, Hooker played in 51 games, scoring 20 goals and assisting on 11 other.

=== National and Olympic teams ===
Hooker's reputation at the high school level led to his selection for the U.S. U-20 national team at the 1983 FIFA World Youth Championship in Mexico. He scored in his first game in that tournament, a 2–3 loss to Uruguay and earned three junior national team caps. He also represented the U.S. at the 1983 Pan American Games.

Hooker earned his first cap with the U.S. national team in an October 9, 1984 victory over El Salvador. That day, both he and fellow rookie Jacques LaDouceur became one of the few first game tandems to score in a game, which the U.S. won 3–1. Hooker also played thirteen games for the U.S. B-Team which at the time formed the core of the U.S. Olympic Team, World University Team and Pan American Team.

=== Professional ===
In 1986, Hooker played a single season as a forward with the San Diego Nomads of the Western Soccer Alliance (WSA) during the collegiate off-season. After leaving UCLA, he went on to play for the Los Angeles Heat of the WSA in 1988 and 1989. His second season with the team saw him rise to sixth on the alliance's points list with 19 on 7 goals and 5 assists. He was also named to the WSA First Team All Star team.

In 1991, he joined the Colorado Foxes of the American Professional Soccer League, which was formed by the merger of the Western Soccer Alliance and the American Soccer League in 1990. Hooker remained with the Foxes during its glory years of 1991 to 1995. The team consistently finished towards the top of the league's rankings and took the championship in 1992 and 1993. In 1991, Hooker played 19 games (starting 17) and scored 3 goals. In 1992, he played only 7 games, scoring 2 goals in the regular season. However, in the Professional Cup, he scored two goals with one coming in the Foxes 4–1 victory over the Tampa Bay Rowdies. In 1995, he scored 7 goals. There are no records for his other seasons with the Foxes.

== Coaching ==
In 1992, besides playing professionally with the Colorado Foxes, Hooker became head coach of the University of Denver women's soccer team, guiding them to a Colorado Athletic Conference championship. In 2002 and 2003, Hooker was named the Sun Belt Conference coach of the year. In 1996 and 1997, he also served as the school's men's soccer coach. During those two seasons, he compiled a 20–12–4 record.
