= Zico Doe =

Liberian footballer

Personal information
- Full name: Ezekiel Koffa Doe
- Place of birth: Monrovia, Liberia
- Height: 5 ft 8 in (1.73 m)
- Position: Forward

Youth career
- 1987–1989: Sangamon State University

Senior career*
Years	Team	Apps	(Gls)
- Invincible Eleven
1990–1991	Cobras de Ciudad Juárez		
1991	Colorado Foxes	17	(11)
1991–1992	San Diego Sockers (indoor)	8	(0)
1992	Miami Freedom	16	(4)
1992–1993	Denver Thunder (indoor)	32	(34)
1993	Fort Lauderdale Strikers	23	(12)
1994	Toronto Rockets		

International career
- Liberia
- * Club domestic league appearances and goals

Ezekiel Koffa "Zico" Doe is a retired Liberian footballer who played as a forward professionally in the American Professional Soccer League, Major Soccer League and National Professional Soccer League. He was the 1991 American Professional Soccer League Rookie of the Year.

== Club career ==
Doe played for several teams in Liberia including the Maryland County team, Yellow Boys and Invincible Eleven. In 1987, he moved to the United States to attend Sangamon State University. He had attended college in Liberia and enough of his credits transferred for him to enter Sangamon State as a sophomore. In 1987, 1988 and 1989 he was a member of the NAIA national men's soccer championship: he was a 1987 Third Team and 1988 First Team NAIA All American. He was also the 1988 Most Valuable Player.

Doe played for Cobras de Ciudad Juárez in Mexico during the 1990–1991 season. In 1991, he returned to the United States and signed with the Colorado Foxes of the American Professional Soccer League. He was the league's third leading scorer, selected for the first APSL All-Star Team and was named the 1991 Rookie of the Year. That fall, he joined the San Diego Sockers of the Major Soccer League. He played limited minutes in three games before being released in December to make room for Mirko Castillo. In February 1992, The Sockers signed Zoe to the reserve team. In March, he began seeing first team games and played through the 1992 playoffs. The MSL folded at the end of the season and the Sockers went into hiatus as the team ownership considered various league options. As a result, Doe played the 1992 outdoor season with the Miami Freedom. In the fall of 1992, he signed with the Denver Thunder of the National Professional Soccer League. In 1993, he played for the Fort Lauderdale Strikers. In 1994, he played for the Toronto Rockets. He later returned to Springfield, Illinois where he played for the amateur indoor team, the Springfield Spirits.

== International career ==
Zoe played frequently for the Liberia national football team. He broke his leg during a World Cup qualifier against Kenya in January 1989.

== Personal life ==
In August 2008, Doe married Vickey Korlewala.
