= Carl Valentine =

Soccer player (born 1958)

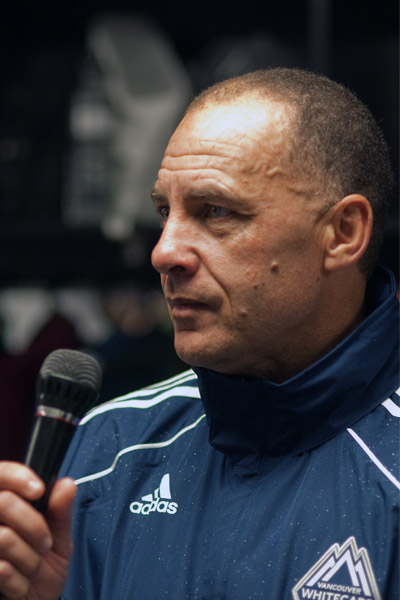
- Valentine in 2011

Personal information
- Full name: Carl Howard Valentine
- Date of birth: 4 July 1958 (age 68)
- Place of birth: Manchester, England
- Height: 1.75 m (5 ft 9 in)
- Position: Striker

Team information
- Current team: Vancouver Whitecaps FC; ambassador/staff coach

Senior career*
Years	Team	Apps	(Gls)
1976–1979	Oldham Athletic	61	(7)
1979–1984	Vancouver Whitecaps	165	(44)
1984–1986	West Bromwich Albion	44	(6)
1985–1987	Cleveland Force (indoor)	124	(83)
1987–1999	Vancouver 86ers	244	(21)
1988–1990	Baltimore Blast (indoor)	100	(55)
1990–1991	Kansas City Comets (indoor)	48	(27)
1991–1992	Tacoma Stars (indoor)	40	(16)

International career
1985–1993	Canada	31	(1)

Managerial career
- 1994–1999: Vancouver 86ers
- 1999–2007: North Shore Development Centre
- 2008–2009: Coastal WFC
- 2009–2010: Fury
- * Club domestic league appearances and goals

Carl Howard Valentine (born 4 July 1958) is a former professional soccer player and coach who has had a long association with soccer in the Vancouver area.

Born in England, he played for the Canada national team at international level.

He was the head coach of Ottawa Fury in the USL Premier Development League until taking the position as Vancouver Whitecaps FC club ambassador and staff coach in 2010, in the lead-up to the Whitecaps inaugural season in Major League Soccer.

== Club career ==
Valentine had a career from the late 1970s to the late 1990s with several clubs, notably the Vancouver Whitecaps of the North American Soccer League, Oldham Athletic, West Bromwich Albion of the Football League, and the Vancouver 86ers of the Canadian Soccer League and later American Professional Soccer League.

A striker, Valentine began his pro career in 1976 as a 17-year-old with Football League Second Division side Oldham Athletic. Valentine signed with the Vancouver Whitecaps and as a rookie helped them win their only North American Soccer League championship in 1979. Liking life in Vancouver, Valentine became a Canadian citizen in 1983. The lure of top division English soccer saw Valentine sign with West Midlands side West Brom in 1984. Until 2011, Valentine was the last player to have scored a winning goal for Albion against their local rivals Aston Villa, having scored the only goal of the game in a 1–0 win in 1985. After two seasons with the Baggies, in which he played 44 first-team games and scored 6 times, Valentine returned to Vancouver to play for the new franchise Vancouver 86ers, where he remained for the next 13 years. Retiring as a full-time player in 1992, Valentine was player/manager of the club until retiring in 1999.

On 22 November 1985, Valentine signed with the Cleveland Force of the Major Indoor Soccer League. Valentine played three seasons with the Force which folded during the 1988 off season. He then signed with the Baltimore Blast. In June 1990, Valentine signed a one-year contract with the Blast only to be traded to the Kansas City Comets in exchange for Dale Mitchell on 21 August 1990. The Comets folded at the end of the season and in September 1991, Valentine signed with the Tacoma Stars.

== International career ==
Initially hoping to be selected to play for England at some point, Valentine passed on an offer to play for Canada at the 1984 Summer Olympics. He decided in 1985 however to declare his allegiance to his new home country and made his debut for Canada in a September 1985 FIFA World Cup qualification match against Honduras. Despite a bad case of influenza, Valentine famously assisted on both goals (with corner kicks) Canada scored to defeat Honduras 2–1 to advance to the World Cup Finals for the first time.

He earned a total of 31 caps, scoring 1 goal. He represented Canada in 9 World Cup qualifiers and played in all three of the country's first-round games in the 1986 World Cup. His final international was a 15 August 1993 World Cup qualification match against Australia in Sydney, a game which also marked the end of the international careers of Dale Mitchell and Mike Sweeney.

== Personal life ==
Valentine has two daughters, Keelie and Shannon, and a son, Gavin. He is currently a Residency coach and Club Ambassador for Whitecaps FC. Valentine is partly of Jamaican descent.

== Career statistics ==
Scores and results list Canada's goal tally first.

#	Date	Venue	Opponent	Score	Result	Competition
1	13 June 1992	Varsity Stadium, Toronto, Canada	Hong Kong	2–0	3–1	Columbus 500 Cup
