= Rick Celebrini =

Canadian soccer player and physiotherapist

Personal information
- Date of birth: October 16, 1967 (age 59)
- Place of birth: Burnaby, British Columbia, Canada
- Height: 6 ft 1 in (1.85 m)
- Position: Defender

Youth career
- 1985–1986: Capilano University
- 1989–1992: University of British Columbia

Senior career*
Years	Team	Apps	(Gls)
1987	Edmonton Brick Men	18	(0)
1989	Edmonton Brick Men	11	(0)
1992–1996	Vancouver 86ers	41	(2)

International career
1987	Canada U-20	5	(0)

Managerial career
- 2011: Vancouver Whitecaps FC (physiotherapist)
Medal record
Representing Canada
Men's Association football
North American Nations Cup
Third place	1991 United States
- * Club domestic league appearances and goals

Rick Celebrini (born October 16, 1967) is a Canadian former soccer player. He is currently the director of sports medicine and performance for the Golden State Warriors, and previously served as physiotherapist and head of sports medicine and science for the Vancouver Whitecaps FC. Celebrini co-founded and was the Director of Sport Medicine and Science at the Fortius Institute from 2013 to 2020.

Celebrini played for the Canadian U-20 national team at the 1987 FIFA World Youth Championship. He played professionally for the Vancouver 86ers.

== Playing career ==
In 1985, Celebrini began his collegiate soccer career at Capilano University. That same year he was named as a BCCAA/PACWEST All-Star. In 1986, Capilano finished second in the Canadian Colleges Athletic Association Soccer Championship and Celebrini was awarded as the team's most valuable player. In 1987, Celebrini transferred to the University of British Columbia, but was out of soccer for nearly two years after breaking his left foot. During his five seasons with the Thunderbirds (1988-1992), Celebrini and his team mates won four consecutive U Sports men's soccer championships. In 1987 and 1989, Celebrini played for the Edmonton Brick Men of the Canadian Soccer League during the collegiate off seasons and played with the Vancouver 86ers in 1992. In 1992, he graduated with a Bachelor of Science in physiotherapy.

On April 22, 1993 signed Vancouver 86ers of the American Professional Soccer League. He remained with Vancouver through the 1996 season, but only played 31 games as he was hampered by injuries.

In 1987, Celebrini earned four caps with the Canadian U-20 national team which competed at the 1987 FIFA World Youth Championship. He also played for the Canadian team at the 1993 Summer Universiade.

== Physiotherapy career ==
Celebrini first became interested in physiotherapy after breaking his ankle when he was fifteen and receiving therapy at a clinic that also treated professional athletes. His interest was reinforced after a broken left foot kept him from playing for two years. After graduating from the University of British Columbia in 1992, Celebrini pursued a career as a physiotherapist in addition to playing professionally. He became the team physiotherapist for the Canadian Alpine Men's Ski Team at the 1994 Winter Olympics and 2002 Winter Olympics. He was the chief therapist and medical manager at the 2010 Winter Olympics. On July 29, 2011, the Vancouver Whitecaps FC hired Celebrini as the team's physiotherapist. In August 2018 he became the director of sports medicine and performance for the Golden State Warriors.

== Director of sport medicine and science ==
Celebrini was a co-founder and partner in the Fortius Institute and senior member in the leadership team behind Fortius Sport & Health, whose building was completed in 2013. The Fortius Institute was an integrated team of sport medicine, science and training leaders committed to best practices in prevention, performance, treatment, education and research. It closed at the end of 2020, and their building was sold to the City of Burnaby. The building is now the Christine Sinclair Community Centre.

== Personal life ==
Celebrini's wife, Robyn, was also a soccer player. They have four children: Aiden, Macklin, Charlie and RJ. Their oldest son, Aiden, is an ice hockey player and a Vancouver Canucks prospect. Their second born son Macklin is an ice hockey player picked first overall by the San Jose Sharks in the 2024 NHL entry draft. In the lead up to the draft lottery, Celebrini expressed hope that the drawing would allow Macklin to be drafted by the Sharks, thus letting the two remain close to each other in the Bay Area.

Celebrini's father immigrated to Canada from Croatia and his mother is from Winnipeg.

== Honours ==
Canada

- North American Nations Cup: 3rd place, 1991
