= Paulinho Criciúma =

Brazilian footballer (born 1961)

Personal information
- Full name: Paulo Roberto Rocha
- Date of birth: 30 August 1961 (age 65)
- Place of birth: Criciúma, Santa Catarina, Brazil
- Height: 1.80 m (5 ft 11 in)
- Position: Center forward

Senior career*
Years	Team	Apps	(Gls)
1976–1982	Criciúma		
1983	América-SP		
1984	Bangu		
1985–1986	POSCO Atoms	28	(9)
1987	Bangu		
1988–1990	Botafogo		
1991	Internacional		
1991–1992	Toyota Motor FC		
1993–1994	Los Angeles Salsa		
1995	Montreal Impact	14	(6)
1995–1996	Atlético Celaya		

Managerial career
- 2001: Barreiras
- 2002: Camaçari
- 2006: Criciúma
- * Club domestic league appearances and goals

Paulo Roberto Rocha usually known as Paulinho or Paulinho Criciúma (born 30 August 1961, in Criciúma) is a Brazilian former footballer and a football head coach.

== Club career ==
During his football career, he played as a center-forward. He represented Criciúma, where he started his career, between 1976 and 1982, América-SP in 1983, Bangu in 1984, POSCO Atoms of South Korea in 1985 and 1986 (League 28 matches-9 goals / League Cup 12 matches-3 goals), then returned to Bangu AC in 1987, signed with Botafogo in 1988, and left the club in 1990, In 1991, he played for Internacional, moving to Toyota Motor FC of Japan in the same year, staying in the Japanese club until 1992. In 1993, Paulinho Criciúma signed with the United States club Los Angeles Salsa which played in the American Professional Soccer League. Paulinho Criciúma was the league's points and goals leader, being named a first team All Star and the league MVP. In 1994, he tied teammate Paul Wright for the points lead, but finished second on the goals list. The Salsa folded at the end of the 1994 season and he moved north to the Montreal Impact of Canada. The fall of 1995, Paulinho Criciúma signed with Atlético Celaya of Mexico, playing until 1996.

Paulinho Criciúma won the Korean Super League in 1986, representing POSCO Atoms, the Campeonato Carioca in 1989 and in 1990 with Botafogo, and the Konica Cup in 1991, with Toyota Motor FC.

== Managerial career ==
He was the head coach of Barreiras in 2001, Camaçari in 2002, and was hired as Criciúma's head coach for the 2006 season, but was sacked on January 23 of that year.
