= Steve MacDonald (soccer) =

Canadian soccer player (born 1970)

Personal information
- Full name: Steven MacDonald
- Date of birth: October 13, 1970 (age 56)
- Place of birth: Vancouver, British Columbia, Canada
- Height: 6 ft 0 in (1.83 m)
- Position: Defender

Senior career*
Years	Team	Apps	(Gls)
1987–2000	Vancouver 86ers	321	(18)

International career
1987	Canada U-17	3	(0)
1988	Canada U-20	3	(1)
1991–1992	Canada U-23	5	(0)
1989–1995	Canada	7	(1)
- * Club domestic league appearances and goals

Steven MacDonald (born October 13, 1970) is a Canadian soccer defender who spent his entire professional career with the Vancouver 86ers. He played extensively for the Canadian national teams between 1987 and 1995.

== Club career ==
MacDonald began playing for the Douglas Park Spartans when he was seven. In 1987, he began his professional career with the Vancouver 86ers of the Canadian Soccer League. From 1988 to 1991, MacDonald and his teammates won four consecutive CSL championships. From June 5, 1988 to August 8, 1989, the team remained undefeated in 46 games (37 wins and nine ties). This set the North American professional record. This team was later inducted into the British Columbia Sports Hall of Fame. In 1992, Vancouver moved to the American Professional Soccer League. MacDonald was a 1993 and 1998 Second Team All League defender. MacDonald also earned 1st team All Star recognition in the CSL (1989, 1990, 1991). He retired at the age of 30 following the 2000 season and holds the Vancouver 86er records for games played, games started, He was also the hard man with an all time team record of yellow and red cards.

On August 31, in the game against the Milwaukee Rampage, the Whitecaps held a ceremony celebrating MacDonald's career. At the ceremony, the Whitecaps retired MacDonald's number 5 jersey.

== International career ==
In 1987, MacDonald made his international debut with the Canadian U-17 team at the 1987 FIFA U-16 World Championship. A year later, he played three games for the Canada men's national under-20 soccer team which failed to advance beyond group play at the 1988 CONCACAF U-20 Tournament. On April 14, 1989, MacDonald earned the first of his seven caps with the senior Canada men's national soccer team in a 0–1 loss to the Faroe Islands. In 1991 and 1992, he played for the Canadian U-23 team during its unsuccessful qualification campaign for the 1992 Summer Olympics. MacDonald's last national team appearance came in a 0–2 loss to Chile in Concepción on October 11, 1995.

=== International goals ===
Scores and results list Canada's goal tally first.

#	Date	Venue	Opponent	Score	Result	Competition
1	4 March 1993	LeBard Stadium, Costa Mesa, USA	United States	1–1	2–2	Friendly match
