= Paul Tamberino =

American soccer player and referee

Paul Tamberino is a retired American soccer midfielder and referee who officiated on the collegiate, professional and international levels. He was the 1998, 1999, 2000 and 2001 Major League Soccer Referee of the Year.

== Player ==
Tamberino grew up in Baltimore, Maryland and graduated from Archbishop Curley High School in 1972. He played collegiate soccer at Essex Community College before transferring to the University of Maryland for the 1976 season. In 1977, he had an unsuccessful trial with the Dallas Tornado of the North American Soccer League. That year, he began his career as a referee. Tamberino officiated most of his days on the fields in Baltimore. He became a national referee for US Soccer in 1987 where he officiated numerous games in RFK stadium in Washington DC where teams from Central America would play on weekends. He later refereed in the ASL where one of his highlights when Sheffield Wednesday played against the professional Baltimore team.

== Referee ==
=== NCAA ===
In 1990, he became a National Intercollegiate Soccer Officials Association member. He would officiate National Collegiate Athletic Association games until 2002, including the 1993 NCAA Men's Division III Soccer Championship and the 1994 and 1999 NCAA Men's Division I Soccer Championship. Later he was inducted into the NISOA Hall of Fame.

=== Professional ===
Tamberino officiated a 1992 American Professional Soccer League semifinal. He later went on to referee in the USISL and National Professional Soccer League. In 1996, he became one of the first eighteen Major League Soccer referees. That season, he officiated during the 1996 Major League Soccer season playoffs. He also officiated the 2000 MLS All-Star Game, MLS Cup 2001 and the 2001 Lamar Hunt U.S. Open Cup final. He was the 1998, 1999, 2000 and 2001 MLS Referee of the Year.

=== International ===
Tamberino was a long time international referee. He officiated at the CONCACAF U-17 Championship 1992. He was the line referee for three Group D matches at the 1999 FIFA U-17 World Championship in New Zealand. He also officiated 1998 FIFA World Cup qualification (CONCACAF) games in S. Korea, Honduras, EL Salvador along with Olympic qualifier in Bermuda

Tamberino retired from refereeing in 2001, where he worked for the US Soccer Federation Director of Referee Development. After US Soccer he went to work for Major League Soccer as Director of competition. He is currently, Coordinator of Officials with 8 collegiate conferences. He is a member of the Maryland Soccer Hall of Fame and the NISOA Hall of Fame. He now resides in Florida.
