= Paul Wright (soccer) =

American soccer player (born 1969)

Personal information
- Date of birth: July 29, 1969 (age 57)
- Place of birth: London, England
- Height: 5 ft 9 in (1.75 m)
- Position: Forward

Youth career
- La Jolla Nomads

Senior career*
Years	Team	Apps	(Gls)
1987–1990	San Diego Nomads		
1989–1990	Cleveland Crunch (indoor)	37	(15)
1990–1992	San Diego Sockers (indoor)	100	(101)
1993	Milwaukee Wave (indoor)	25	(45)
1993–1994	Los Angeles Salsa	42	(25)
1993–1994	Baltimore Blast (indoor)	35	(62)
1994–1995	Wichita Wings (indoor)	21	(8)
1995	Sacramento Knights (indoor)	27	(27)
1996–1999	Kansas City Wizards	88	(11)
1999–2002	Western Mass Pioneers	55	(22)
1999–2002	Baltimore Blast (indoor)	124	(86)
2001	→ Philadelphia KiXX (indoor) (loan)	7	(0)
2002–2005	San Diego Sockers (indoor)	59	(33)
2006	San Diego Fusion		
2009–2011	San Diego Sockers (indoor)	28	(24)
2011	Anaheim Bolts (indoor)	8	(4)
2012–2013	San Diego Sockers (indoor)	9	(6)

Managerial career
- 2023–: Empire Strykers
- * Club domestic league appearances and goals

Paul Wright (born July 29, 1969) is a U.S. soccer forward who spent most of his career in the U.S. indoor leagues. He began his career with the San Diego Nomads in the Western Soccer Alliance, led the American Professional Soccer League in scoring in 1994 and played four seasons with the Kansas City Wizards in Major League Soccer.

He is currently the head coach for the Empire Strykers in the Major Arena Soccer League.

== Youth ==
While born in London, England, Wright moved to the United States with his family when he was a child. They settled in Modesto California, and attended Mark Twain Junior High School where he began playing soccer in local youth leagues. At some point, his family moved to San Diego where Wright would join the powerhouse La Jolla Nomads soccer club. He also played for Grossmont High School, leading the league in scoring his junior and senior seasons. When he graduated in 1986, he held the school's single season scoring record with 39.

== Professional ==
In 1987, Wright moved to the Nomads senior team, the San Diego Nomads which played in the Western Soccer Alliance. The Nomads won the league championship that season and again in 1988. In 1990, the WSA merged with the east-coast based American Soccer League to form the American Professional Soccer League (APSL). The Nomads spend one season in the APSL before leaving the league. In 1989, the Cleveland Crunch of the Major Indoor Soccer League drafted Wright with the sixth pick of the expansion draft. On March 6, 1990, the Crunch traded Wright to the San Diego Sockers. The Sockers, perennial contenders, won the MISL championship that season with Wright named as the Championship Series Unsung Hero. Wright remained in San Diego until the MISL collapsed in 1992. On January 7, 1993, Wright signed with the Milwaukee Wave of the National Professional Soccer League (NSPL). Although the Wave failed to make the playoffs, Wright's forty-five goals in twenty-five games led to his selection as a first team All Star. That summer Wright signed with the Los Angeles Salsa of the outdoor American Professional Soccer League. In October, 1993, the Salsa loaned Wright to the Baltimore Blast of the NPSL. Wright was back the Salsa for the summer 1994 season, but after the Salsa folded that fall, he signed with the Wichita Wings of the NPSL for the 1994–1995 season. Wright would not return to the NPSL until 1999. In 1993, Wright signed with the Los Angeles Salsa of the outdoor American Professional Soccer League. He had not played outdoor soccer since playing with the Nomads in 1990, but this did not stop Wright from finishing second in points and goals to teammate Paulinho Criciúma, being named a first team All Star. In 1994, Wright led the league in scoring, tying Paulhino for the points lead. He was again selected as a first team All Star. After playing with the Baltimore Blast during the 1994–1995 winter indoor season, Wright did not return to the APSL, but instead signed with the Sacramento Knights of the Continental Indoor Soccer League (CISL). The CISL played a summer indoor schedule. In December 1995, Major League Soccer announced it had signed Wright to a league contract. In preparation for its first season, MLS signed players to contracts, then distributed these players through the league via an initial allocation and an inaugural player draft. In February 1996, the Kansas City Wizards selected Wright in the third round (twenty-fifth overall) of the 1996 MLS Supplemental Draft. He spent four seasons in Kansas City. When the Wizards released him in 1999, Wright signed with the Western Mass Pioneers where he played four outdoor seasons. In the fall of 1999, he returned to the Baltimore Blast in the NPSL. He spent most of three seasons in Baltimore, but saw time in seven games with the Philadelphia KiXX during the 2000–2001 season. In February 2002, the Blast waived Wright, who was leading the team in scoring at the time. The San Diego Sockers quickly signed Wright in preparation for the team's move to the new Major Indoor Soccer League (MISL). In October 2002, he signed another year-long contract and remained with the Sockers until it discontinued operations in December 2005. On January 5, 2005, the Chicago Storm selected Wright in the MISL Dispersal Draft. Wright both owns an athletic training company, Speed to Burn. In April 2006, he joined the San Diego Fusion of the amateur fourth division National Premier Soccer League. In 2009, he signed with the San Diego Sockers of the Professional Arena Soccer League. In May 2011, it was announced he signed with a new team in the PASL, the Anaheim Bolts. In October 2012, he re-signed with the San Diego Sockers for the 2012–13 season.

== Coaching ==
Wright was named head coach of the Major Arena Soccer League's Empire Strykers in July 2023.
