= Taifour Diané =

Guinean footballer and manager

Personal information
- Date of birth: 1 November 1972 (age 53)
- Place of birth: Kankan, Guinea
- Height: 1.85 m (6 ft 1 in)
- Position: Forward

Team information
- Current team: 1. FC Saarbrücken (Woman manager)

Youth career
- Horoya AC

Senior career*
Years	Team	Apps	(Gls)
–1990	Horoya AC		
1992–1993	Colorado Foxes	34	(20)
1993–1995	Bayer Leverkusen	1	(0)
1995–1996	→ Bor. Mönchengladbach (loan)	0	(0)
1996–1997	Bayer Leverkusen	0	(0)
1997–1998	FC Homburg		
1998–1999	1. FC Saarbrücken	33	(11)
1999–2002	Alemannia Aachen	89	(20)
2004–2007	1. FC Saarbrücken	42	(8)
2007–2008	SV Elversberg	16	(1)
2008–2009	Borussia Neunkirchen	5	(0)

International career
	Guinea	18	(5)

Managerial career
- 2010–2011: FC Homburg (assistant)
- 2011: FC Homburg (caretaker)
- 2011–2012: FC Homburg (assistant)
- 2015–2016: 1. FC Saarbrücken (assistant)
- 2016: 1. FC Saarbrücken
- 2016–: 1. FC Saarbrücken (women)
- * Club domestic league appearances and goals

Taifour Diané (born 1 November 1972) is a Guinean former footballer and the manager of 1. FC Saarbrücken's women's team.

== Career ==
Diané was born in Kankan, Guinea.

In 1992, Diané signed with the Colorado Foxes of the American Professional Soccer League. He was the league MVP, Rookie of the Year, first team All League and the league's second leading scorer. That season, the Foxes won the league championship. He continued with the Foxes in 1993.

== Personal life ==
He also holds German citizenship.
