= Brian Haynes (footballer) =

Trinidadian footballer (born 1962)

Personal information
- Date of birth: 7 May 1962 (age 64)
- Place of birth: Couva, Trinidad and Tobago
- Height: 6 ft 0 in (1.83 m)
- Position: Midfielder

Youth career
- 1986–1989: Erskine College

Senior career*
| Years | Team | Apps | (Gls) |
| 1989–1991 | Atlanta Attack (indoor) | | |
| 1991–1996 | → Kansas City Attack (indoor) | 170 | (201) |
| 1990 | Orlando Lions | | |
| 1991 | Maryland Bays | 20 | (9) |
| 1992–1995 | Colorado Foxes | | |
| 1995 | Seattle Sounders | 6 | (0) |
| 1996–2000 | Dallas Burn | 77 | (8) |
| 1997 | → New Orleans Riverboat Gamblers (loan) | 1 | (0) |
| 1999 | → Milwaukee Rampage (loan) | 2 | (0) |
| 1999 | → Texas Toros (loan) | 2 | (1) |
| 2000 | → Texas Rattlers (loan) | 2 | (0) |
| 1997–1998 | Wichita Wings (indoor) | 37 | (29) |

International career
| 1987–1996 | Trinidad and Tobago | 21 | (8) |

Managerial career
- 2001–2006: FC Dallas (assistant)
- 2007–2008: Real Colorado Cougars
- 2012: Atlanta Silverbacks (assistant)
- 2012–2013: Atlanta Silverbacks
- 2018–2019: Houston Dynamo (academy)
- 2019–2021: Inter Miami (academy)
- 2021: FC Dallas (academy)
- 2021: Charlotte Independence (assistant)
- 2022–: Colorado Rapids 2 (assistant)
- * Club domestic league appearances and goals

|2023- | Currently = Trinidad and Tobago National Team Head Coach U20 and U22 Boys

Brian Haynes (born 7 May 1962) is a Trinidadian football coach and former player who earned 21 caps with the Trinidad and Tobago national team. He spent his entire professional career in the United States where he played for numerous indoor and outdoor leagues. He was the 1991 American Indoor Soccer Association Rookie of the Year, won three American Professional Soccer League titles and played five seasons with the Dallas Burn in Major League Soccer.

== Club career ==
Haynes was born in Couva, Trinidad and Tobago. He attended Erskine College, playing on the men's soccer team from 1986 to 1989. He was a three time NAIA All American. He graduated in 1989. In the fall of 1989, Haynes signed with the Atlanta Attack of the American Indoor Soccer Association where he was the 1990 Rookie of the Year. Haynes remained with the Attack until 1996. In 1990, the league was renamed the National Professional Soccer League. In 1991, Attack team moved to Missouri where it became the Kansas City Attack. That year, Haynes was a first team All Star. In 1990, Haynes began his outdoor career with the Orlando Lions of the American Professional Soccer League (APSL). In 1991, Haynes played for the Maryland Bays of the American Professional Soccer League. In 1992, he moved to the Colorado Foxes. Haynes and his teammates won the 1992 and 1993 APSL championships. They also won the 1992 Professional Cup, with Haynes scoring a goal in the Final. In 1995, Haynes began the season with the Foxes, but the Seattle Sounders (1994–2008) purchased him for an undisclosed amount of cash in August 1995. The move to the Sounders gave Haynes his third APSL and fourth overall championship as Seattle won the title. On 6 February 1996, the Dallas Burn selected Haynes in the 4th round (33rd overall) in the 1996 MLS Inaugural Player Draft. He remained with the Burn through the 2000 season. However, that year, he played only one game. In 1997, he played one game on loan to the New Orleans Riverboat Gamblers. On 27 August 1999, Haynes played two games on loan with the Milwaukee Rampage of the USL A-League while serving a red card suspension with the Burn. He played one more indoor season during his time with the Burn. In 1997, he joined the Wichita Wings of the NPSL.

== International career ==
Haynes earned twenty-one caps, scoring eight goals, with the Trinidad and Tobago national football team between 1987 and 1996.

== Managerial career ==
On 16 March 2001, the Dallas Burn announced they had hired Haynes as an assistant coach. He remained with the Burn until 2007 when he became the head coach of the Real Colorado Cougars of the W-League. He served as the head coach for the Atlanta Silverbacks of the North American Soccer League from 2012 until the end of 2013, losing in the final of the 2013 season, but he was not retained following the season despite being named 2013 NASL Coach of the Year.

In March 2021, after coaching stints with the academies of Houston Dynamo, Inter Miami, and FC Dallas, Haynes joined USL Championship side Charlotte Independence as an assistant.
