= Danny Pena =

American soccer player (born 1968)

Personal information
- Date of birth: June 17, 1968 (age 58)
- Place of birth: Inglewood, California, United States
- Height: 6 ft 0 in (1.83 m)
- Position: Midfielder

Senior career*
Years	Team	Apps	(Gls)
1988–1990	Los Angeles Heat		
1990–1992	Wichita Wings (indoor)	95	(40)
1991–1992	San Francisco Bay Blackhawks	23	(2)
1993	San Jose Hawks		
1993–1994	Los Angeles Salsa		
1994–1995	Dayton Dynamo (indoor)	16	(4)
1995–1996	Sacramento Knights (indoor)	48	(34)
1996–1997	→ Cincinnati Silverbacks (indoor) (loan)	22	(17)
1997–2001	Los Angeles Galaxy	115	(9)
2001	Tampa Bay Mutiny	6	(1)
- * Club domestic league appearances and goals

Danny Pena (born June 17, 1968, in Inglewood, California) is a retired U.S. soccer defensive midfielder. He spent most of his career, both indoors and outdoors, with teams in the western U.S.

== Player ==
=== Youth ===
Pena grew up in Southern California, playing for the Fram-Culver soccer club. In 1986, he, and teammate Marcelo Balboa, took Fram-Culver all the way to the U-19 McGuire Cup title. The next year, he played all three games at the 1987 FIFA World Youth Championship.

=== Professional ===
After high school, he chose to forgo college and signed with the Los Angeles Heat of the Western Soccer Alliance (WSA) in 1988. He remained with the Heat through the 1990 season which the Heat played in the American Professional Soccer League (APSL). In 1991, the Blackhawks won the league title, defeating the Albany Capitals as Pena was selected as a first team All Star. The next season, the Blackhawks lost to the Tampa Bay Rowdies in the semifinals. However, Pena again was selected as a first team All Star. When the Blackhawks owner withdrew the team from the APSL and moved them down a division to the USISL, Pena left the team and joined the Los Angeles Salsa of the APSL. He remained with the Salsa for two seasons, 1993 and 1994. In both seasons, he continued his streak of being selected to the All Star team. In 1993, the Salsa lost the title game to the Colorado Foxes. He began his indoor career with the Wichita Wings of Major Indoor Soccer League (MISL) with the 1991–1992 season. In 1994, he joined the Dayton Dynamo of the 1994-1995 National Professional Soccer League (NPSL) season. His brother, Carlos, was the goalkeeper for Dayton. In 1995, he moved to the Sacramento Knights of the Continental Indoor Soccer League (CISL). That season he was a CISL first team All Star and the CISL Defender of the Year as the Knights lost to the Monterrey La Raza. Major League Soccer (MLS) signed Pena to a contract in 1996, but then loaned him to the Cincinnati Silverbacks of the National Professional Soccer League (NPSL) in November 1996. The Los Angeles Galaxy of MLS selected Pena in the 1997 MLS Supplemental Draft. He spent the 1997 season in Los Angeles, but the Galaxy failed to protect him in the 1997 MLS Expansion Draft and the Chicago Fire selected him with their first pick. However, he expressed his dissatisfaction with this development and on January 27, 1998, the Galaxy traded Chris Armas and Jorge Campos to the Fire for Pena and Kevin Hartman. Pena suffered a season ending knee injury in June 2000. While he returned for the 2001 season, the Galaxy sent Pena to the Tampa Bay Mutiny on July 30, 2001, for a conditional pick in the 2002 draft. He saw time in six games, then was released at the end of the season.

=== National team ===
In 1997, the USMNT called up Pena, but he declined the invitation.

== Managerial career ==
Pena now coaches boys' soccer in Torrance, California. He is also on staff with the Beach Soccer Club. He won nationals with his boys' team. He has a silver elite girls' team at Beach Soccer Club. He also has a boys' team who won Cal South State Cup and was invited to Dallas Cup.
