= Eric Eichmann =

American soccer player

Personal information
- Date of birth: May 7, 1965 (age 61)
- Place of birth: Margate, Florida, United States
- Height: 5 ft 10 in (1.78 m)
- Position: Forward

Youth career
- 1983–1987: Clemson

Senior career*
Years	Team	Apps	(Gls)
1986	Atlanta Datagraphic		
1987–1988	Werder Bremen II		
1988–1992	Fort Lauderdale Strikers		
1992	Wichita Wings (indoor)	23	(27)
1994	Washington Warthogs (indoor)	27	(19)
1994–1995	St. Louis Ambush (indoor)	19	(12)
1996	Kansas City Wizards	15	(0)

International career
1986–1993	United States	29	(4)

Managerial career
- 2000–2002: Miami Fusion (assistant)
Medal record
Representing United States
Runner-up	CONCACAF Championship	1989
Men's Soccer
- * Club domestic league appearances and goals

Eric Eichmann (born May 7, 1965) is an American former soccer player. He played professionally in Germany and the United States and later served as an assistant coach with the Miami Fusion of Major League Soccer. He also earned 29 caps and scored four goals, for the United States national soccer team.

== College ==
Born in Margate, Florida, Eichmann grew up in Florida where St. Thomas Aquinas High School and played for the Key Biscayne Gunners youth club. Eichmann played college soccer Clemson University of the Atlantic Coast Conference (ACC). His freshman year, he earned All-ACC honors. In 1984, the team won the NCAA national championship. His most successful individual year came as a junior when he set a school record of nineteen assists while helping his team to the ACC championship. As a senior, Eichmann earned First-Team All-American honors. In 1986, he also played for Atlanta Datagraphic, a top level amateur club.

== Professional career ==
After graduation, Eichmann played a single season with German Third Division team Werder Bremen II. The next year he returned to the United States where he played with the Fort Lauderdale Strikers of the ASL/APSL from 1988 to 1993. His time with the team saw them win the 1989 APSL Championship. In 1992, he began a career as an itinerant indoor soccer player. He began with the Wichita Wings of the National Professional Soccer League (NPSL) for one season, before moving on to the Washington Warthogs of the Continental Indoor Soccer League (CISL) in 1993–1994 and finally the St. Louis Ambush of the NPSL from 1994 to 1996. In 1995, the Ambush won the league championship. In 1996, the Kansas City Wiz of the Major League Soccer (MLS) took Eichmann as the thirty-sixth pick (fourth round) of the league's inaugural draft. He would play one season and retire as a full-time soccer player.

== International career ==
=== World Cup and Olympics ===
Eichmann earned his first cap on February 5, 1986, against Canada. He went on to play a total of 28 games with the senior team, scoring four goals. He was a member of the U.S. Olympic soccer team at the 1988 Summer Olympics as well as the U.S. team at the 1990 FIFA World Cup. His last game with the national team came against Honduras on March 25, 1993.

=== Futsal ===
Eichmann also earned seventeen caps with the U.S. futsal team between 1986 and 1992. During that period, he played on the U.S. team which took third at the 1989 FIFA Futsal World Championship and second at the 1992 championship. He ended his futsal career with seven goals.

== Coaching career ==
After retiring as a player, Eichmann served as an assistant coach of the Miami Fusion of the MLS from 2000 to 2002. He is the Director of Coaching and Player Development for the South Florida Football Academy (ex Boca United), a youth academy team in Florida part of MLS Next
