= Tom Soehn =

American soccer coach (born 1966)

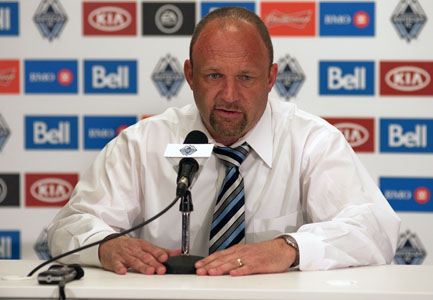

Personal information
- Date of birth: April 15, 1966 (age 60)
- Place of birth: Chicago, Illinois, United States
- Height: 5 ft 10 in (1.78 m)
- Position: Defender

College career
Years	Team	Apps	(Gls)
1984–1987	Western Illinois Leathernecks		

Senior career*
Years	Team	Apps	(Gls)
1988–1992	Wichita Wings (indoor)	147	(17)
1989-1990	Ottawa Intrepid	27	(6)
1991	Hamilton Steelers	9	(0)
1992–1993	Denver Thunder (indoor)	35	(20)
1992–1994	Colorado Foxes		
1993–1996	Wichita Wings (indoor)	101	(68)
1995	Las Vegas Dustdevils (indoor)	27	(16)
1996–1998	Dallas Burn	43	(0)
1998–2000	Chicago Fire	60	(2)

Managerial career
- 2001–2003: Chicago Fire (assistant)
- 2003–2006: D.C. United (assistant)
- 2006–2009: D.C. United
- 2011: Vancouver Whitecaps FC (interim)
- 2014–2017: New England Revolution (assistant)
- 2017: New England Revolution (interim)
- 2018–2025: Birmingham Legion
- * Club domestic league appearances and goals

Tom Soehn (born April 15, 1966) is an American soccer coach who last headed USL Championship club Birmingham Legion. A former player, his career as a defender spanned seven clubs across 12 seasons, both indoors and outdoors.

== Playing career ==
=== Youth and college ===
Soehn was born to immigrant parents. His parents moved to the United States from Germany, but his father was born in Romania. Soehn began playing soccer with the Chicago Kickers when he was four. He attended Forest View High School. He attended Western Illinois University from 1984 to 1987. In 2003, Western Illinois inducted Soehn into its Athletics Hall of Fame.

=== Indoor soccer ===
Soehn signed with the Wichita Wings of Major Indoor Soccer League from 1988 to 1992. He moved to the Denver Thunder of the National Professional Soccer League (NPSL) for the 1992–1993 season before returning to the Wings in 1993 which were now playing in the NPSL. He remained with the Wings until 1996. In 1995, he played the summer indoor season with the Las Vegas Dustdevils of the Continental Indoor Soccer League (CISL).

=== CSL ===
In 1989 and 1990, Soehn played with the Ottawa Intrepid of the Canadian Soccer League (CSL). In 1991, he played with the Hamilton Steelers.

=== APSL ===
In addition to playing indoor soccer, Soehn played with the Colorado Foxes of the American Professional Soccer League (APSL) in 1992, 1993 and 1994. The Foxes went to three consecutive APSL championship games those three seasons. They won the 1992 and 1993 titles, but lost to the Montreal Impact in 1994.

=== MLS ===
Soehn played four years in MLS after being drafted by the Dallas Burn in the second round of the 1996 MLS Inaugural Player Draft. He missed the 1996 season with the injury, but played for the Burn in 1997. In 1998, he began the season with the Burn, but was traded to the Chicago Fire after fourteen games. He remained with the Fire until he retired from playing in 2000. During his time with Chicago, he was a member of the Fire's three championship teams (MLS Cup 1998, U.S. Open Cup 1998 and 2000).

== Coaching career ==
After retiring as a player, he became an assistant coach to Bob Bradley at the Fire and then moved to D.C. United to become Peter Nowak's top assistant in 2003. During his time as the top assistant, D.C. United won MLS Cup in 2004, and a Supporters Shield in 2005. On December 21, 2006, Soehn replaced Nowak as the head coach at United.

On November 3, 2009, it was announced that Soehn had withdrawn himself for consideration for a contract renewal, ending a three-year reign that included a Supporters Shield in 2007, an Open Cup in 2008 and Open Cup Runner-Up in 2009.

On January 19, 2010, Soehn was given the job as Director of Soccer Operations by Canadian soccer club Vancouver Whitecaps FC. On May 30, 2011, it was announced that he would take over as head coach of the Vancouver Whitecaps, after Teitur Thordarson was let go by the club. After the 2011 season ended, Soehn stepped down from the head coaching role in favor for Martin Rennie and reclaimed his former position as Director of Soccer Operations.

On November 15, 2012, it was revealed that Soehn and Vancouver Whitecaps FC had mutually parted ways.

As of January 10, 2014, Soehn has been brought to the New England Revolution as an assistant coach to Jay Heaps.

On September 18, 2017, it was reported that Jay Heaps had been fired and that Soehn would take over as the interim coach of the New England Revolution.

On August 16, 2018, the newly-formed Birmingham Legion FC announced that Soehn would become head coach of the team ahead of their first season in the USL. On April 9, 2025, he was released as head coach of Legion FC.

== Managerial statistics ==
As of match played October 27, 2019

Managerial record by team and tenure
Team	Nat	From	To	Record							
Team	Nat	From	To	G	W	D	L	GF	GA	GD	Win %
D.C. United	(United States)	December 21, 2006	November 3, 2009	134	54	32	48	210	190	+20	40.30
Vancouver Whitecaps (interim)	(Canada)	May 30, 2011	October 25, 2011	23	5	4	14	23	40	−17	21.74
New England Revolution (interim)	(United States)	September 19, 2017	November 9, 2017	5	3	1	1	8	10	−2	60.00
Birmingham Legion	(United States)	August 16, 2018	April 9, 2025	82	37	17	28	115	101	+14	45.12
Total				244	99	54	91	356	341	+15	40.57
