= Kevin Sloan =

American soccer player and coach

Personal information
- Date of birth: December 23, 1965 (age 60)
- Place of birth: Mount Airy, Maryland, United States
- Height: 5 ft 10 in (1.78 m)
- Positions: Forward; midfielder

College career
Years	Team	Apps	(Gls)
1984–1987	Catawba Indians		

Senior career*
Years	Team	Apps	(Gls)
1988–1991	Maryland Bays		
1988–1989	Dayton Dynamo (indoor)	31	(14)
1991–1992	Baltimore Blast (indoor)	32	(12)
1992–1993	Tampa Bay Rowdies	28	(10)
1992–1994	Dayton Dynamo (indoor)	59	(74)
1994–1996	Baltimore Spirit (indoor)	80	(136)
1995	Delaware Wizards		
1996	Carolina Dynamo	11	(4)
1996	Sacramento Knights (indoor)	5	(3)
1997	New Jersey Stallions		(8)
1997–2006	Philadelphia KiXX (indoor)	258	(270)
1998–1999	Staten Island Vipers	46	(13)
2007–2008	New Jersey Ironmen (indoor)	14	(4)

International career
2003	U.S. Futsal		

Managerial career
- Philadelphia University (assistant)
- 2004–2008: Philadelphia KiXX (assistant)
- 2006–2015: Neumann University
- 2007–2008: New Jersey Ironmen (assistant)
- * Club domestic league appearances and goals

Kevin Sloan is a retired American soccer player who played professionally in the American Soccer League, American Professional Soccer League and Major Indoor Soccer League. He has also coached professionally and is the former head coach of the Neumann College men's soccer team. Kevin took on a bigger role in 2015, when he resigned from Neumann to take on a new challenge as a scout for Manchester City

== Player ==
=== Youth ===
Sloan graduated from Oakland Mills High School. He then attended Catawba College where he was a 1986 Second Team and a 1985 and 1987 First Team NAIA All American soccer player. He holds the record for career goals with 56 and was inducted into the Catawba Athletic Hall of Fame in 2010.

=== Professional ===
In June 1988, the Chicago Sting selected Sloan in the first round of the Major Indoor Soccer League draft. When the Sting folded a few weeks later, the Cleveland Force received the rights to Sloan, but did not sign him. By that time, Sloan was playing for the Maryland Bays of the American Soccer League. On October 19, 1988, Sloan signed with the Dayton Dynamo of the American Indoor Soccer Association. He returned to the Bays for the 1989 summer season. In 1990, the ASL merged with the Western Soccer League to form the American Professional Soccer League. Sloan and his team mates took the APSL's inaugural championship. In October 1991, he returned to the indoor game, this time with the Baltimore Blast of the Major Soccer League. On February 25, 1992, Sloan signed with the Tampa Bay Rowdies. In October 1992, he rejoined the Dayton Dynamo, now playing in the National Professional Soccer League. Sloan played two seasons with the Dynamo. In September 1994, the Dynamo traded Sloan and Joe Mallia to the Baltimore Spirit in exchange for Rob Ukrop and Clark Brisson. In 1995, he played for the Delaware Wizards of the USISL. In 1996, he played a single season with the Carolina Dynamo. In September 1996, Sloan signed with the Sacramento Knights late in the Continental Indoor Soccer League season as the team struggled with injuries. That fall, he moved to the Philadelphia KiXX of the NPSL. He remained with the KiXX until 2007. In addition to playing for the KiXX, he spent the 1998 and 1999 outdoor summer seasons with the Staten Island Vipers of the USISL. In July 2007, the New Jersey Ironmen selected Sloan in the Major Indoor Soccer League draft. He spent a season with the Ironmen as a player-assistant coach.

=== Futsal ===
In 2003, Sloan played for the United States national futsal team.

== Coach ==
Sloan served as an assistant coach at Philadelphia University. In 2004, he became an assistant coach with the Philadelphia KiXX. In 2006, Sloan became the head coach of Neumann College.
