= Colorado Foxes =

Former men's soccer club in Commerce City, Colorado

- Full name: Colorado Foxes (1990–1997); San Diego Flash (1998–2000); San Diego F.C. (2001)
- Founded: 1990; 36 years ago
- Dissolved: 2001; 25 years ago
- League: American Professional Soccer League (1990–1996); USL A-League (1997–2001)

The Colorado Foxes were a professional men's soccer club originally based in Commerce City, Colorado, that played in the American Professional Soccer League (APSL) and USL A-League. Founded in 1990, the club moved to San Diego, California in 1998 and became the San Diego Flash, and later San Diego F.C., before folding in 2001. The club won the 1992 Professional Cup, and back-to-back APSL titles in 1992 and 1993.

== History ==
=== Commerce City (1990–1997) ===
The Foxes won two APSL titles, in 1992 and 1993. In 1992 they won the regular season as well as the Professional Cup, giving them a minor treble. The Foxes defeated English Premier League side Norwich City F.C. 3–2 in a Four Nations Cup exhibition match on July 18, 1993, placing third in the tournament. They had previously lost to 1. FC Kaiserslautern of Germany. The team also hosted a 1996 benefit match in Montoursville, Pennsylvania, for the victims of TWA Flight 800; the Foxes defeated the Atlanta Ruckus 3–0 at a local football stadium.

When Major League Soccer started and the Colorado Rapids became the region's premier team, the Foxes tried unsuccessfully to compete in the same market for two years. The club was acquired by Yan Skwara and Sam Kaloustian in December 1997 and immediately relocated to San Diego, California, becoming the San Diego Flash.

=== San Diego (1998–2001) ===
The club averaged approximately 2,500 fans per game when playing its home games at Southwest College and San Diego Mesa College. The largest crowd for a Flash match was 6,500 at Mesa College for a US Open Cup match against Major League Soccer's Los Angeles Galaxy in 2000. In 2001, the La Jolla Nomads took over operation of the team and renamed it San Diego FC. The Flash were fairly successful during their short stint in the league, winning the Pacific Division in 1998 and 1999, finishing second in 2000 and 2001, progressing to the quarter-finals of the A-League playoffs in 2001, and reaching the third round of the US Open Cup on two separate occasions. Its head coaches during this period included Ralf Wilhelms, Costa Skouras, Papo Santos, and Colin Clarke. After the 2001 season the team folded due to management and financial problems. A phoenix club, also by the name of the San Diego Flash, was founded in 2011 and began play in the National Premier Soccer League.

== Notable players ==
Players that played for the Foxes and then went on to play in MLS include Marcelo Balboa, Robin Fraser, Brian Haynes, Chad Ashton, Tom Soehn, Ted Eck, Scott Benedetti, and Mark Dodd.

- (United States) Joe Cannon
- (United States) Jimmy Conrad
- (Romania) Mugurel Dumitru
- (Brazil) Thiago Martins

== Seasons ==
| Year | Division | League | Reg. season | Playoffs | Open Cup | Avg. attendance |
|---|---|---|---|---|---|---|
| 1990 | 1 | APSL | 2nd, WSL North | Semifinals | Did not enter | |
| 1991 | 1 | APSL | 3rd, Western | Did not qualify | Did not enter | |
| 1992 | 1 | APSL | 1st | Champion | Did not enter | |
| 1993 | 1 | APSL | 2nd | Champion | Did not enter | |
| 1994 | 1 | APSL | 4th | Final | Did not enter | 3,540 |
| 1995 | 1 | A-League | 5th | Did not qualify | Quarterfinals | 5,896 |
| 1996 | 2 | A-League | 2nd | Semifinals | 2nd Round | 4,200 |
| 1997 | 2 | USISL A-League | 4th, Pacific | Division Semifinals | Did not enter | 983 |
| 1998 | 2 | USISL A-League | 1st, Pacific | Conference Finals | Did not qualify | 3,083 |
| 1999 | 2 | USL A-League | 1st, Pacific | Conference Finals | 3rd round | 2,463 |
| 2000 | 2 | USL A-League | 2nd, Pacific | Conference Quarterfinals | 3rd round | 2,787 |
| 2001 | 2 | USL A-League | 2nd, Western | Quarter-finals | 2nd round | 580 |
| 2025-26 | | MLIS | 4th, South | Did Not Qualify | | 1,000 |

== Stadiums ==
- Jefferson County Stadium, Lakewood, Colorado (1990–1991)
- Englewood High School, Englewood, Colorado (1992–1993)
- Mile High Stadium, Denver, Colorado (1994–1995)
- Kickers Field, Golden, Colorado (1994, 2 games)
- Mile High Greyhound Park, Commerce City, Colorado (1996–1997)
- DeVore Stadium, Chula Vista, California (1998), 7,200 seats
- Merrill Douglas Stadium, San Diego, California (1999–2001)

== Honors ==
- American Professional Soccer League
  - Champions (2): 1992, 1993
  - Runners-up (1): 1994
- Professional Cup
  - Champions (1): 1992
