= Englewood High School (Colorado) =

Location
- 3800 South Logan Street; Englewood, Colorado 80113; United States; 39°38′48″N 104°58′58″W

Information
- Type: Public high school
- Established: 1913 (113 years ago)
- School district: Englewood Schools
- CEEB code: 060525
- Principal: Nate Smith
- Staff: 35.78 (FTE)
- Grades: 9–12
- Student to teacher ratio: 15.12
- Colors: Blue and white
- Athletics: 2A, 3A, 4A, 5A
- Athletics conference: 3A (football) 4A Metro (lacrosse)
- Mascot: Pirate
- Website: ehs.englewoodschools.net

Englewood High School is a public high school located in the city of Englewood, Colorado, United States. It is one of two high schools in the Englewood Schools District. Its enrollment is approximately 600 students in grades 9–12. There are about 65 licensed teachers, 40 of whom hold a master's degree or higher. The school is accredited by the North Central Association of Secondary Schools and the Colorado Department of Education, and holds membership in the College Board, the National Alliance of High Schools, and the National Association of College Admissions Counselors. The school also holds a chapter in the National Honor Society. The school was founded in 1913. Englewood has more Boettcher Scholars than any other metro area high school, with 30.

== History ==
Englewood High's original location was at Broadway and Kenyon Avenues. As enrollment increased, the school grew out of its original building, and in 1953, construction on a new building began. The class of 1954 was the first to move into the new building, which still stands today. In the early 1960s the school renovated its structure, adding a full-size auditorium, library, and more classrooms. The school is currently located in Englewood at the corner of Mansfield Avenue and Logan Street.

Next to the campus is the Hosanna Athletic Complex, which contains the baseball and soccer fields. In 2005, a new artificial turf field was installed at a cost of $600,000.

Until the 2024-2025 school year, the principal of Englewood High had been Ryan West. He resigned for personal reasons, and was replaced by Nate Smith.

The new 239,000 square foot campus, dedicated February 7, 2015, located at the corner of Mansfield Avenue and Logan Street, now accommodates roughly 1,250 students from the high school and Englewood Middle School.

== Athletics ==
Englewood competes in 3A, and 4A athletics and is a member of the Colorado High School Activities Association.

== Notable alumni ==
- Ray Baker (class of 1966), actor
- Lee Horsley (class of 1973), actor
- Mike Wegener (class of 1964), former Major League Baseball pitcher
- Steve Engel (class of 1965), former football running back Cleveland Browns
