= 1991 Canadian Soccer League season =

Canadian Soccer League
- Season: 1991
- Dates: May 26 – September 8 (regular season); September 11 – October 6 (playoffs)
- Champions: Vancouver 86ers
- Regular season leader: Vancouver 86ers
- Matches: 112
- Goals: 342 (3.05 per match)
- Top goalscorer: (Canada) Domenic Mobilio (25)
- Best goalkeeper: (Canada) Paolo Ceccarelli (1.05 GAA)

The 1991 Canadian Soccer League season was the fifth season of play for the Canadian Soccer League, a Division 1 men's soccer league in the Canadian soccer pyramid.

== Format and changes from previous season ==
Prior to the 1991 season, the league placed four franchises under suspension – Ottawa Intrepid, Edmonton Brick Men, Victoria Vistas, and London Lasers – due to financial difficulties. Ultimately, Ottawa, Edmonton, and Victoria folded, while London requested a one-year leave of absence. To avoid similar problems that the now defunct NASL had in its final year of operation, the league approved a $175,000 salary cap per team to further limit costs.

In addition, CSL commissioner Dale Barnes retired in January after directing the league since its inception, with Hamilton Steelers owner, Mario DiBartolomeo, taking over the responsibilities on a temporary basis. The league also approved a travel equalization plan that dramatically reduced costs for Vancouver, Winnipeg, and Nova Scotia.

The Nova Scotia Clippers joined the league as an expansion franchise. In addition, the Kitchener Spirit changed their name to the Kitchener Kickers following an ownership change.

The league shifted to a single eight-team division, after previously operating two East and West geographical divisions since its inception, resulting in team's playing a balanced schedule for the first time in league history, playing each other clubs four times, twice at home and twice on the road. The point system was also updated along with FIFA's change to 3–1–0 (win–draw–loss). With the shift to a single division, the league reverted to six teams qualifying for the playoffs, with the top two finishers during the season receiving a bye to the semi-finals. The playoff format remained the same as the previous year.

== Summary ==
The regular season once again belonged to the Vancouver 86ers, who were only the second team to win 20 regular season games. In the playoffs, Vancouver won their fourth consecutive league title, defeating the Toronto Blizzard in the finals.

== Regular season ==
Pos	Team	Pld	W	D	L	GF	GA	GD	Pts	Qualification
1	Vancouver 86ers (C)	28	20	4	4	69	31	+38	64	Playoff semifinals
2	Toronto Blizzard	28	14	6	8	57	33	+24	48	Playoff semifinals
3	North York Rockets	28	13	9	6	50	36	+14	48	Playoff quarterfinals
4	Hamilton Steelers	28	14	4	10	42	38	+4	46	Playoff quarterfinals
5	Montreal Supra	28	11	7	10	41	38	+3	40	Playoff quarterfinals
6	Nova Scotia Clippers	28	7	7	14	29	53	−24	28	Playoff quarterfinals
7	Kitchener Kickers	28	4	7	17	28	56	−28	19	
8	Winnipeg Fury	28	4	6	18	26	57	−31	18	

Source: Canadian Soccer History Archives 1991 CSL Stats
(C) Playoff Champion and qualification for the 1992 CONCACAF Champions' Cup.

== Playoffs ==
The playoffs were conducted with a total points system. Teams earned two points for a win, one point for a draw, and zero points for a loss. The team with the most points following the two-game series advanced. If the teams were tied on points, they played a 30-minute mini-game for a bonus point, followed by a penalty shootout if the mini-game remained tied.

Quarterfinals
4	Hamilton Steelers (a.e.t.)	0	4 (1)	2+1 PTS
5	Montreal Supra	3	0 (0)	2 PTS
3	North York Rockets	4	5	4 PTS
6	Nova Scotia Clippers	0	1	0 PTS

Semifinals
1	Vancouver 86ers	1	2	3 PTS
4	Hamilton Steelers	1	1	1 PTS
2	Toronto Blizzard (a.e.t.)	2	1 (1)	2+1 PTS
3	North York Rockets	0	2 (0)	2 PTS

Finals
1	Vancouver 86ers	5
2	Toronto Blizzard	3

=== Quarterfinal ===
September 11, 1991	Montreal Supra	3–0	Hamilton Steelers	Montreal, Quebec
	Frank Aliaga 17'; Needham 74'; Pierre-Richard Thomas 90'	[ Report]		Stadium: Claude Robilliard Stadium; Attendance: 1,423

September 15, 1991	Hamilton Steelers	5–0 (a.e.t.)	Montreal Supra	Hamilton, Ontario
	Jason Gibbons, Ianiero; Morris; Aunger	[ Report]		Stadium: Brian Timmis Stadium; Attendance: 2,154

Hamilton Steelers won the series in extra time, after the series was tied 2-2 on points.

September 11, 1991	Nova Scotia Clippers	0–4	North York Rockets	Dartmouth, Nova Scotia
		[ Report]	Majcher; Carter; Berdusco; Radzinski	Stadium: Beazley Field

September 15, 1991	North York Rockets	5–1	Nova Scotia Clippers	North York, Ontario
	Majcher, Golen; Commisso; Radzinski 77'	[ Report]	Dwight Hornibrook 56'	Stadium: Esther Shiner Stadium; Attendance: 1,605

North York Rockets won the series 4-0 on points.

=== Semifinal ===
September 22, 1991	Hamilton Steelers	1–1	Vancouver 86ers	Hamilton, Ontario
	Ianiero 13'	[ Report]	Nocita 77' (o.g.)	Stadium: Brian Timmis Stadium; Attendance: 4,100

September 29, 1991	Vancouver 86ers	2–1	Hamilton Steelers	Vancouver, British Columbia
	Catliff 1', 21'	[ Report]	Ianiero 12'	Stadium: Swangard Stadium; Attendance: 4,431

Vancouver 86ers won the series 3-1 on points.

September 22, 1991	North York Rockets	0–2	Toronto Blizzard	North York, Ontario
		[ Report]	Mitchell 25'; Eck 34'	Stadium: Esther Shiner Stadium; Attendance: 2,650; Referee: Bob Sawtell

September 29, 1991	Toronto Blizzard	2–2 (a.e.t.)	North York Rockets	Etobicoke, Ontario
	Mitchell 3'; Peschisolido 116'	[ Report]	Gastis 35'; Berdusco 65'	Stadium: Centennial Park Stadium; Attendance: 2,627; Referee: Luigi Mellino

Toronto Blizzard won the series in extra time, after the series was tied 2-2 on points.

=== Final ===
October 6, 1991	Vancouver 86ers	5–3	Toronto Blizzard	Vancouver, British Columbia
17:00	McKinty (~1); Norman 3' (?); Catliff 48'; Mobilio 60' (pen.)	[ Report Star ] [ Report Sun ]	Eck 26'; DiFlorio (~61); Hooper (?)	Stadium: Swangard Stadium; Attendance: 5,692; Referee: Gord Arrowsmith

== Statistics ==
=== Top scorers ===
Rank	Player	Club	Goals
1	(Canada) Domenic Mobilio	Vancouver 86ers	25
2	(Canada) Eddy Berdusco	North York Rockets	14
3	(Canada) John Berti	Winnipeg Fury	12
4	(Canada) Geoff Aunger	Hamilton Steelers	10
4	(United States) Ted Eck	Toronto Blizzard	10
4	(Poland) Marek Grabowski	North York Rockets	10
4	(Canada) Dale Mitchell	Toronto Blizzard	10
8	(United States) John Kerr	Hamilton Steelers	9
9	(Canada) Alex Bunbury	Montreal Supra	7
9	(Canada) Gino DiFlorio	Toronto Blizzard	7
9	(England) Justin Fashanu	Toronto Blizzard	7
9	(Canada) Doug Muirhead	Toronto Blizzard	7

=== Top goaltenders ===
Rank	Player	Club	GAA
1	(Canada) Paolo Ceccarelli	North York Rangers	1.053
2	(Canada) Pat Onstad	Toronto Blizzard	1.062
3	(Canada) Paul Dolan	Vancouver 86ers	1.063
4	(Canada) Dino Perri	Hamilton Steelers	1.300
5	(Canada) Pat Harrington	Montreal Supra	1.320

== Honours ==
The following awards and nominations were awarded for the 1991 season.

=== Awards ===
Award	Player	Team
Most Valuable Player	(Canada) Domenic Mobilio	Vancouver 86ers
Rookie of the Year	(Canada) Scott Munson	Kitchener Kickers
Top Newcomer	(Poland) Marek Grabowski	North York Rangers
Top Goaltender	(Canada) Paolo Ceccarelli	North York Rangers
Fair Play Award	Hamilton Steelers	

=== League All-Stars ===
Player	Position
(Canada) Paolo Ceccarelli (North York Rockets)	Goalkeeper
(Canada) Peter Sarantopoulos (North York Rockets)	Defender
(Canada) Mark Watson (Hamilton Steelers)	Defender
(Canada) Steve MacDonald (Vancouver 86ers)	Defender
(Canada) Norman Odinga (Vancouver 86ers)	Defender
(Canada) Carl Valentine (Vancouver 86ers)	Midfielder
(Canada) Dale Mitchell (Toronto Blizzard)	Midfielder
(Fiji) Ivor Evans (Vancouver 86ers)	Midfielder
(Canada) Eddy Berdusco (North York Rockets)	Forward
(Canada) Domenic Mobilio (Vancouver 86ers)	Forward
(Canada) Grant Needham (Montreal Supra)	Forward

Reserves

Player	Position
(Canada) Paul Dolan (Vancouver 86ers)	Goalkeeper
(Canada) Paul James (Toronto Blizzard)	Defender
(Canada) Tony Nocita (Hamilton Steelers)	Defender
(Canada) Nick De Santis (Montreal Supra)	Midfielder
(United States) Ted Eck (Toronto Blizzard)	Forward

Front office

Person	Role
(Italy) Fiorigi Pagliuso (North York Rockets)	Head coach
(Canada) Alan Errington (Vancouver 86ers)	Assistant coach
(Canada) Bob Lenarduzzi (Vancouver 86ers)	General manager

=== Player of the Month ===
Month	Player	Club
June	(Canada) Dino Lopez	Nova Scotia Clippers
July	(Canada) Domenic Mobilio	Vancouver 86ers
August	(Canada) Domenic Mobilio	Vancouver 86ers

=== Player of the Week ===
Week	Player	Club
1	(Canada) Dino Lopez	Nova Scotia Clippers
2	(Canada) Dale Mitchell	Toronto Blizzard
3	(Canada) Pat Harrington	Montreal Supra
4	(Canada) Doug Muirhead	Vancouver 86ers
5	(Fiji) Ivor Evans	Vancouver 86ers
6	(Canada) Lyndon Hooper	Toronto Blizzard
7	(Canada) Peter Sarantopoulos	North York Rockets
8	(Canada) Paolo Ceccarelli	North York Rockets
9	(Canada) Norman Odinga	Vancouver 86ers
10	(Canada) Joseph Majcher	North York Rockets
11	(Canada) Domenic Mobilio	Vancouver 86ers
12	(Canada) Geoff Aunger	Hamilton Steelers
13	(Canada) Alex Bunbury	Montreal Supra
14	(Canada) Brett Pence	Kitchener Kickers
15	(Canada) Paul Peschisolido	Hamilton Steelers

== Average home attendances ==
Pos.	Team	GP	Total Attendance	Average Attendance
1	Vancouver 86ers	14	64,107	4,579
2	Montreal Supra	14	39,112	2,794
3	Hamilton Steelers	14	35,369	2,526
4	Winnipeg Fury	14	32,096	2,293
5	North York Rockets	14	27,864	1,990
6	Toronto Blizzard	14	25,945	1,853
7	Nova Scotia Clippers	14	21,098	1,507
8	Kitchener Kickers	14	9,418	673
Total Attendance		112	255,009	2,277
