= 1990 Canadian Soccer League season =

Canadian Soccer League
- Season: 1990
- Champions: Vancouver 86ers
- Division Leaders: Toronto Blizzard (East); Vancouver 86ers (West)
- Matches: 143
- Goals: 390 (2.73 per match)
- Top goalscorer: (Canada) John Catliff (19)
- Best goalkeeper: (Canada) Pat Harrington (0.43 GAA)

The 1990 Canadian Soccer League season was the fourth season of play for the Canadian Soccer League, a Division 1 men's soccer league in the Canadian soccer pyramid.

== Format and changes from previous season ==
The Kitchener Spirit and London Lasers joined the Canadian Soccer League as an expansion teams for the 1990 season, with both joining the East Division. Meanwhile, the Calgary Strikers folded following the 1989 season.

As a result of those team changes, the league had a seven-team East Division and a four-team West Division. Consequently, the league did not have a balanced home and away schedule between conferences. West Division teams played each other four times each, twice each home and away, while playing the East Division teams twice, once each home and away. Eastern Division teams played other East Division teams three times, while playing the West Division teams twice, once each home and away.

The playoff format was also modified with eight teams (five from the East and three from the West) now qualifying for the post-season, as opposed to six in the previous years. The fifth place team from the East would cross over and play in the West Division playoff bracket. In addition, the playoff format was changed from an aggregate score system to a total points system. Teams would play a two-game series, with teams earning two points for a victory, one point for a draw, and zero points for a loss, regardless of the score. If the teams were tied on points (e.g. each team won a game, or both games were ties), then the first tiebreaker was the teams playing a thirty-minute mini-game. If the mini-game resolved nothing, then penalty kicks were used as the second tiebreaker. In the mini-game, each team named a new lineup, could include three more substitutes and re-activate any players who sat out of Game Two for caution accumulation. Game Two home teams, the higher seeds, had an advantage as they had their entire 22-man active list available while away teams often traveled with as few as 14 players for economic reasons. The playoff final remained a one-off match, as in previous years, hosted by the top seed, or team with the best league record, in 1990.

== Summary ==
Vancouver won their third consecutive West Division title, while Toronto won their second East Division title in a row. Once again, Vancouver and Hamilton met in the finals for the third consecutive season, with Vancouver winning the title for the third time in a row.

As 1989 league champions, the Vancouver 86ers competed in the North American Club Championship against the champions of the American Professional Soccer League, the Maryland Bays. Vancouver defeated Maryland 3–2 in the final played in Burnaby to capture the title.

== Regular season ==
=== East Division ===
Pos	Team	Pld	W	D	L	GF	GA	GD	Pts	Qualification
1	Toronto Blizzard	26	18	3	5	52	15	+37	39	Playoffs
2	Montreal Supra	26	13	11	2	30	12	+18	37	Playoffs
3	Hamilton Steelers	26	10	9	7	44	35	+9	29	Playoffs
4	Kitchener Spirit	26	8	7	11	30	36	−6	23	Playoffs
5	North York Rockets	26	7	9	10	34	36	−2	23	Playoffs
6	Ottawa Intrepid	26	2	9	15	21	49	−28	13	
7	London Lasers	26	2	7	17	26	68	−42	11	

Source: Canadian Soccer History Archives 1990 CSL Stats

=== West Division ===
Pos	Team	Pld	W	D	L	GF	GA	GD	Pts	Qualification
1	Vancouver 86ers (O)	26	17	6	3	69	26	+43	40	Playoffs
2	Victoria Vistas	26	12	7	7	42	32	+10	31	Playoffs
3	Winnipeg Fury	26	7	8	11	22	37	−15	22	Playoffs
4	Edmonton Brick Men	26	6	6	14	20	44	−24	18	

Source: Canadian Soccer History Archives 1990 CSL Stats
(O) Play-off winners

=== Overall table ===
Pos	Team	Pld	W	D	L	GF	GA	GD	Pts
1	Vancouver 86ers (O)	26	17	6	3	69	26	+43	40
2	Toronto Blizzard	26	18	3	5	52	15	+37	39
3	Montreal Supra	26	13	11	2	30	12	+18	37
4	Victoria Vistas	26	12	7	7	42	32	+10	31
5	Hamilton Steelers	26	10	9	7	44	35	+9	29
6	Kitchener Spirit	26	8	7	11	30	36	−6	23
7	North York Rockets	26	7	9	10	34	36	−2	23
8	Winnipeg Fury	26	7	8	11	22	37	−15	22
9	Edmonton Brick Men	26	6	6	14	20	44	−24	18
10	Ottawa Intrepid	26	2	9	15	21	49	−28	13
11	London Lasers	26	2	7	17	26	68	−42	11

Source: Canadian Soccer History Archives 1990 CSL Stats
(O) Play-off winners

== Playoffs ==
The playoffs were conducted with a total points system. Teams earned two points for a win, one point for a draw, and zero points for a loss. The team with the most points following the two-game series advanced. If the teams were tied on points, they played a 30-minute mini-game for a bonus point, followed by a penalty shootout if the mini-game remained tied.

Quarter-finals
1W	Vancouver 86ers	2	2	4 PTS
5E	North York Rockets	0	1	0 PTS
West Division
2W	Victoria Vistas (p)	1	3 (5)	2+1 PTS
3W	Winnipeg Fury	4	2 (4)	2 PTS
2E	Montreal Supra	1	0	0 PTS
3E	Hamilton Steelers	2	1	4 PTS
East Division
1E	Toronto Blizzard	1	1 (3)	2 PTS
4E	Kitchener Spirit (p)	2	0 (4)	2+1 PTS

Semi-finals
1W	Vancouver 86ers	2	6	3 PTS
2W	Victoria Vistas	2	1	1 PTS
3E	Hamilton Steelers	1	3	3 PTS
4E	Kitchener Spirit	0	3	1 PTS

Final
1W	Vancouver 86ers	6
3E	Hamilton Steelers	1

=== Quarterfinal ===
September 12, 1990	North York Rockets	0–2	Vancouver 86ers	North York, Ontario
		[ Report]	Mitchell 8'; Catliff 85'	Stadium: Esther Shiner Stadium; Attendance: 1,000

September 16, 1990	Vancouver 86ers	2–1	North York Rockets	Vancouver, British Columbia
	Catliff 19'; Evans 47'	[ Report]	Enrico Todesco 78'	Stadium: Swangard Stadium; Attendance: 3,340

Vancouver 86ers won the series 4–0 on points.

September 12, 1990	Winnipeg Fury	4–1	Victoria Vistas	Winnipeg, Manitoba
	Mike Mosher 26'; Cambridge 70'; Holness 86'; Dave Foley 87'	[ Report]	Bridge	Stadium: Winnipeg Stadium; Attendance: 1,155

September 15, 1990	Victoria Vistas	3–0 (Match Voided) (Note: Winnipeg protested the result of the original second leg due to the fielding of an ineligible player, Geoff Aunger (who should have been suspended due to yellow card accumulation and who scored the winning goal in extra time), that the league office failed to communicate to the teams involved or match officials. The CSL league office mandated a last minute replay of the second leg on Thursday, September 20, 1990 in Winnipeg) (a.e.t.)	Winnipeg Fury	Victoria, British Columbia
	David Ravenhill 69'; Ken Andrews 76'; Aunger 98'	[ Report]		Stadium: Royal Athletic Park; Attendance: 1,980

September 20, 1990	Winnipeg Fury	2–3 (a.e.t.) (4–5 p)	Victoria Vistas	Winnipeg, Manitoba
	Nocita 85'; Dave Foley 105'	[ Report]	Rick Jaskins 56'; Steve Cecchi 87', 97'	Stadium: Winnipeg Stadium; Attendance: 839

Victoria Vistas won the series in a shootout, after the series was tied 2–2 on points.

September 12, 1990	Hamilton Steelers	2–1	Montreal Supra	Hamilton, Ontario
	Fashanu 55', 84'	[ Report]	Keith 83'	Stadium: Brian Timmis Stadium; Attendance: 2,650

September 15, 1990	Montreal Supra	0–1	Hamilton Steelers	Montreal, Quebec
		[ Report]	Fashanu 82'	Stadium: Claude Robilliard Stadium; Attendance: 1,573

Hamilton Steelers won the series 4–0 on points.

September 12, 1990	Kitchener Spirit	2–1	Toronto Blizzard	Kitchener, Ontario
	Colville 43'; Hunter Madeley 47'	[ Report]	Peschisolido 29'	Stadium: Centennial Stadium; Attendance: 1,029

September 16, 1990	Toronto Blizzard	1–0 (a.e.t.) (3–4 p)	Kitchener Spirit	Etobicoke, Ontario
	Eck 82'	[ Report]		Stadium: Centennial Park Stadium; Attendance: 2,960; Referee: Bernie Huxter
	Penalties
	Gray (penalty scored); Marco Antonucci (penalty scored); Pignatiello (penalty scored); Fenwick (penalty missed)		(penalty scored) Piękoś; (penalty scored) Ferguson; (penalty scored) Scott; (penalty scored) Woody Bailey

Kitchener Spirit won the series in a shootout, after the series was tied 2–2 on points.

=== Semifinal ===
September 22, 1990	Victoria Vistas	2–2	Vancouver 86ers	Victoria, British Columbia
	Evans; Steve Cecchi 82'	[ Report]	Mobilio 27'; Evans 28'	Stadium: Royal Athletic Park; Attendance: 3,775

September 30, 1990	Vancouver 86ers	6–1	Victoria Vistas	Vancouver, British Columbia
	Mobilio, Mitchell; Evans; McKinty; Sammy Saundh	[ Report]	Aunger	Stadium: Swangard Stadium; Attendance: 5,883

Vancouver 86ers won the series 3–1 on points.

September 22, 1990	Kitchener Spirit	0–1	Hamilton Steelers	Kitchener, Ontario
		[ Report]	John Coyle 72'	Stadium: Centennial Stadium; Attendance: 1,325

September 30, 1990	Hamilton Steelers	3–3	Kitchener Spirit	Hamilton, Ontario
	Fashanu 12'; Billy Domazetis 29', 52'	[ Report]	Hardley Scott 7'; Mike Carter 61'; Scott 68'	Stadium: Brian Timmis Stadium; Attendance: 1,956

Hamilton Steelers won the series 3–1 on points.

=== Final ===
October 8, 1990	Vancouver 86ers	6–1	Hamilton Steelers	Vancouver, British Columbia
19:30	Catliff,, Evans; Mitchell; Mobilio	[ Report]	Billy Domazetis	Stadium: Swangard Stadium; Attendance: 6,348; Referee: Tony Evangelista

== Statistics ==
=== Top scorers ===
Rank	Player	Club	Goals
1	(Canada) John Catliff	Vancouver 86ers	19
2	(Canada) Domenic Mobilio	Vancouver 86ers	13
2	(Canada) Paul Peschisolido	Toronto Blizzard	13
4	(Canada) Alex Bunbury	Hamilton Steelers/Toronto Blizzard	12
5	(Canada) Billy Domazetis	Toronto Blizzard	10
6	(Canada) Eddy Berdusco	North York Rockets	9
6	(United States) Ted Eck	Toronto Blizzard	9
7	(Canada) Geoff Aunger	Victoria Vistas	8
7	(Fiji) Ivor Evans	Vancouver 86ers	8

=== Top goaltenders ===
Rank	Player	Club	GAA
1	(Canada) Pat Harrington	Montreal Supra	0.43
2	(Canada) Pat Onstad	Toronto Blizzard	0.58
3	(Canada) Paul Dolan	Vancouver 86ers	1.08
4	(Canada) Grant Darley	Victoria Vistas	1.13
5	(Canada) Shel Brodsgaard	Victoria Vistas	1.16

== Honours ==
The following awards and nominations were awarded for the 1990 season.

=== Awards ===
Award	Player	Team
Most Valuable Player	(Canada) Pat Harrington	Montreal Supra
Canadian Player of the Year	(Canada) John Catliff	Vancouver 86ers
Rookie of the Year	(Canada) Jorge Rodriguez	London Lasers
Top Newcomer	(Scotland) Allan Evans	Victoria Vistas
Top Goaltender	(Canada) Pat Harrington	Montreal Supra
Fair Play Award	Edmonton Brick Men	

=== League All-Stars ===
Player	Position
(Canada) Pat Harrington (Montreal Supra)	Goalkeeper
(Canada) Patrick Diotte (Montreal Supra)	Defender
(Scotland) Allan Evans (Victoria Vistas)	Defender
(Canada) Ian Bridge (Victoria Vistas)	Defender
(Brazil) Edinho (Toronto Blizzard)	Defender
(South Africa) Michael Araujo (Montreal Supra)	Midfielder
(Canada) Lyndon Hooper (Toronto Blizzard)	Midfielder
(Fiji) Ivor Evans (Vancouver 86ers)	Midfielder
(Canada) Domenic Mobilio (Vancouver 86ers)	Forward
(Canada) John Catliff (Vancouver 86ers)	Forward
(Canada) Paul Peschisolido (Toronto Blizzard)	Forward

Reserves

Player	Position
(Canada) Tim Rosenfeld (Winnipeg Fury)	Goalkeeper
(Canada) Steve MacDonald (Vancouver 86ers)	Defender
(Canada) Vlado Vanis (Vancouver 86ers)	Defender
(Canada) Jaime Lowery (Vancouver 86ers)	Midfielder
(Canada) Alex Bunbury (Toronto Blizzard)	Forward

Front office

Person	Role
(Canada) Roy Wiggemansen (Montreal Supra)	Head Coach
(Canada) Ian Bridge (Vancouver 86ers)	Assistant Coach
(Canada) Roy Wiggemansen (Montreal Supra)	General Manager

== Average home attendances ==
Pos.	Team	GP	Average Attendance
1	Vancouver 86ers	26	4,218
2	Winnipeg Fury	26	4,194
3	Montreal Supra	26	2,711
4	Toronto Blizzard	26	2,221
5	Victoria Vistas	26	1,725
6	Hamilton Steelers	26	1,574
7	Edmonton Brick Men	26	1,474
8	Kitchener Spirit	26	1,338
9	Ottawa Intrepid	26	1,357
10	North York Rockets	26	1,061
11	London Lasers	26	N/A
Total Attendance		286	2,187
