= John Hughes (soccer, born 1965) =

Canadian soccer player

Personal information
- Full name: John Hughes
- Date of birth: July 3, 1965 (age 61)
- Place of birth: Swansea, Wales
- Height: 5 ft 10 in (1.78 m)
- Position: Defender

Youth career
- 1971–1982: Cadboro Bay, Bays United

Senior career*
Years	Team	Apps	(Gls)
1985	Victoria Riptide		
1987	Vancouver 86ers	13	(0)
1988	Winnipeg Fury	26	(0)
1989–1990	Victoria Vistas	45	(0)
1991	Hamilton Steelers	3	(0)

International career
1982	Canada U19		
1986–1987	Canada	5	(0)
1987	Canada men's Olympic team	4	(0)
- * Club domestic league appearances and goals

Richard John Hughes (born July 3, 1965) is a former professional soccer player. Born in Swansea, Wales, he moved to Victoria, British Columbia, Canada in 1971. He played for Cadboro Bay, which later became Bays United Soccer Club. He attended Mount Douglas Secondary School, where he played on a soccer team with Jeff Mallett and Simon Keith.

Hughes represented Canada at the 1982 CONCACAF Youth Tournament in Guatemala and won his first cap with Canada's senior team on 27 August 1986 at the Merlion Cup in Singapore. He played for the University of Victoria Vikings and was part of the 1987 national winning side. He played professionally for the Vancouver 86ers, Winnipeg Fury, Victoria Vistas, and Hamilton Steelers of the Canadian Soccer League.

Hughes' father, Brian, was also a professional soccer player.
