= Kitchener Kickers =

Kitchener Kickers has been the name of some semi-professional soccer teams in Canada:

- Kitchener Kickers (NSL) (1965, 1966, ?1967-69), of the Canadian National Soccer League
- Kitchener Kickers (CSL) (1991), of the Canadian Soccer League (1987–1992)
