= Rodney Scott =

Rodney Scott may refer to:

- Rodney Scott (actor) (born 1978), American actor
- Rodney Scott (baseball) (born 1953), infielder in Major League Baseball
- Rodney S. Scott, chief of the United States Border Patrol
- Rodney Scott (pitmaster) (born 1971), American chef and barbecue pitmaster

== See also ==
- Roderick Scott (born 1965), Canadian soccer player and coach
- Rod Scott (born 1958), American politician, member of the Alabama House of Representatives
