= Marek Grabowski =

Marek Grabowski may refer to:

- Marek Grabowski (footballer)
- Marek Grabowski (politician)
