= Kitchener Spirit =

Former soccer team in Kitchener, Ontario

Kitchener Spirit (1990) Kitchener Kickers (1991)
- Full name: Kitchener Kickers
- Nicknames: Spirit, Kickers
- Founded: 1990 (as Kitchener Spirit)
- Dissolved: 1991
- Stadium: Centennial Stadium
- Capacity: 3,200
- League: Canadian Soccer League
- 1991: 7th

The Kitchener Spirit were a professional soccer team in Kitchener, Ontario that played in the Canadian Soccer League. The team debuted in the 1990 season as the Kitchener Spirit and were renamed the Kitchener Kickers in 1991. The club folded following the 1991 season.

== History ==
In 1990, the team joined the semi-professional Canadian Soccer League as the Kitchener Spirit. During their debut season, they set a league record for goals scored in a game with an 8–1 victory over the London Lasers. They finished fourth in their division, advancing to the playoffs, where they defeated the Toronto Blizzard in the first round in penalty kicks before falling in the semi-finals against the Hamilton Steelers. They were coached by John McGrane in 1990, but he departed after the season.

After the 1990 season, the team changed owners and became known as the Kitchener Kickers with player Drew Ferguson becoming the team's head coach. The club failed to make the playoffs, winning only four matches amid rumours of financial instability. Just three weeks before the start of the 1992 league season, the club folded.

The Kitchener–Waterloo region was without a professional team since the Kickers departed in 1991, until SC Waterloo Region joined the later Canadian Soccer League in 2011, while K–W United FC played in the pre-professional Premier Development League from 2013 until 2017.

== Seasons ==
Name	Season	Tier	League	Record	Rank	Playoffs	Ref
Kitchener Spirit	1990	1	Canadian Soccer League	8–7–11	4th, East	Semifinals	
Kitchener Kickers	1991	1	Canadian Soccer League	4–7–17	7th	Did not qualify	

== Coaches ==
- John McGrane (1990)
- Drew Ferguson (1991)

== Notable players ==
- (Canada) Ian Bridge
- (England) Mike Carter
- (England) (Wales) Bob Colville
- (Canada) Jason de Vos
- (Canada) Paul Fenwick
- (Canada) Drew Ferguson
- (Canada) Peter Gilfillan
- (Canada) Dino Lopez
- (Scotland) Peter Mackie
- (Canada) Craig Martin
- (Canada) Trevor McCallum
- (Iran) (Canada) Peyvand Mossavat
- (Canada) Scott Munson
- (Poland) Mirosław Piękoś
- (England) (Canada) Roderick Scott
- (England) Darren Tilley
- (Saint Kitts and Nevis) Dean Walling
