= 1991 National Soccer League season =

National Soccer League
- Season: 1991
- Champions: Toronto Italia (12th title)
- League Cup: Toronto Argentina
- Top goalscorer: Gerry Vande Merwe (14)
- Best goalkeeper: Paulo Silva

The 1991 National Soccer League season was the sixty-eighth season under the National Soccer League (NSL) name. The season concluded on September 22, 1991, with Toronto Italia securing the NSL Championship by finishing first in the standings by a single point difference between Scarborough International and St. Catharines Roma.

The NSL Ontario Cup was claimed by Toronto Argentina after defeating the Toronto Jets at Lamport Stadium in Toronto, Ontario. The Toronto side would also add the NSL Canadian Cup to their résumé by defeating the Montreal Dollard at Complexe sportif Claude-Robillard in Montreal, Quebec.

== Overview ==
The membership in the league increased to a total of ten clubs from nine in the previous season. Two of the new additions were revealed at the annual general meeting held in Toronto on December 2, 1990. NSL Second Division titleholders North York Strikers were promoted to the First Division, while Toronto International, which later relocated to Scarborough, Ontario, returned to the league after a stint in the Ontario Soccer League. The Toronto Jets and Woodbridge Azzuri were also promoted to the First Division. Toronto Argentina was the lone expansion franchise that made its NSL debut in 1991.

The increase in membership was particularly notable, as the league lost two established clubs, Toronto First Portuguese and Toronto Panhellenic, due to financial constraints. America United and Oshawa Italia were the other two clubs that were disbanded. After establishing the necessary connections in the Quebec soccer structure, league commissioner Rocco Lofranco announced potential expansion plans into the province. The member clubs also began recruiting more domestic players instead of relying on imports. After a series of philosophical differences and disputes with the Canadian Soccer Association (CSA) about the structure of professional soccer officials from the NSL, negotiations began with the CSA, which resulted in a friendly match between the Canadian Olympic team and Toronto Italia.

The league continued the NSL Canadian Cup, where the NSL Ontario Cup champions faced the league cup winner from the Quebec National Soccer League.

=== Teams ===
Team	City	Stadium	Manager
London City	London, Ontario	Cove Road Stadium	Harry Gauss
North York Strikers	North York, Ontario	Esther Shiner Stadium	
Scarborough International	Scarborough, Ontario	Birchmount Stadium	Manuel Bilches
St. Catharines Roma	St. Catharines, Ontario	Club Roma Stadium	
Toronto Argentina	Toronto, Ontario	Lamport Stadium	Elio Garro
Toronto Croatia	Etobicoke, Ontario	Centennial Park Stadium	Vid Horvath
Toronto Italia	Etobicoke, Ontario	Centennial Park Stadium	Peter Felicetti
Toronto Jets	North York, Ontario	Esther Shiner Stadium	
Windsor Wheels	Windsor, Ontario	Windsor Stadium	Walter Barbosa
Woodbridge Azzuri	Vaughan, Ontario	Rainbow Park Stadium	

Location of NSL teams outside of Toronto for the 1991 NSL season.

Location of NSL teams in Toronto for the 1991 NSL season.

== Final standings ==
Pos	Team	Pld	W	D	L	GF	GA	GD	Pts	Qualification
1	Toronto Italia (C)	18	11	5	2	28	13	+15	27	Qualification for Playoffs
2	Scarborough International	18	10	6	2	25	11	+14	26	
3	St. Catharines Roma	17	12	2	3	37	18	+19	26	
4	Toronto Croatia	18	9	4	5	22	13	+9	22	
5	Toronto Argentina	18	8	5	5	30	18	+12	21	
6	Woodbridge Azzuri	18	6	5	7	23	30	−7	17	
7	Windsor Wheels	18	5	3	10	22	33	−11	13	
8	North York Strikers	17	4	2	11	12	26	−14	10	
9	Toronto Jets	17	2	5	10	16	27	−11	9	
10	London City	18	2	3	13	15	36	−21	7	

Updated to match(es) played on September 23, 1991. Source:
Rules for classification: 1) points; 2) goal difference; 3) number of goals scored.
(C) Champions

== Individual awards ==
The recipients of the annual NSL awards were announced on December 18, 1991, with members from London City, Toronto Croatia, and Toronto Italia receiving the awards. After successfully leading Italia to a championship title, Peter Felicetti was named the Coach of the Year. Felicetti previously had managerial experience in the Canadian Soccer League, and later managed in the American Professional Soccer League with the Toronto Rockets. London City's Paul Hillman was recognized as the Rookie of the Year. Ivica Raguž of Toronto Croatia was given the MVP award, and would ultimately play in the Croatian First Football League, and the S. League.

Award	Player (Club)
NSL MVP	Ivica Raguž (Toronto Croatia)
NSL Rookie of the Year Award	Paul Hillman (London City)
NSL Coach of the Year Award	Peter Felicetti (Toronto Italia)
