= Peter Felicetti =

Canadian soccer manager and coach

Personal information
- Place of birth: Italy

Managerial career
- Years: Team
- 1980: Monteleone
- 1982: Ciociaro
- 1982: Satellite
- 1989: North York Rockets
- 1991: Toronto Italia
- 1994: Toronto Rockets

Peter Felicetti is a former Canadian soccer general manager and head coach with notable stints in the Canadian Soccer League and American Professional Soccer League.

== Career ==
In 1980, he managed in the Toronto and District Soccer League with Monteleone, and secured the Consols Cup. In 1982, he managed Ciociaro in the Toronto and District Soccer League, and Satellite in the Amicizia Soccer League. Felicetti served as the technical director in 1988 for the North York Rockets in the Canadian Soccer League. In 1989, he was named the head coach for North York after Mirko Bazic was dismissed on August 21, 1989. In 1990, he was dismissed from his post after the North York management declined to renew his contract for the 1990 CSL season.

In 1991, he served as the head coach for Toronto Italia in the National Soccer League where he received the NSL Coach of the Year award after securing the NSL Championship for Toronto. In 1994, he was appointed head coach for Toronto Rockets in the American Professional Soccer League. Later he was replaced by Hector Leonardo Marinaro.

== Honors ==
=== Manager ===
Toronto Italia

- NSL Championship: 1991

Monteleone

- Toronto and District Soccer League Consols Cup: 1980

Individual

- NSL Coach of the Year: 1991
