= Vladan Tomić =

Cypriot footballer and football manager (1967–2016)

Vladan Tomic
Personal information
- Full name: Vladan Tomić
- Date of birth: 18 May 1967
- Place of birth: Ševarice, SR Serbia, Yugoslavia
- Date of death: 19 October 2016 (aged 49)
- Place of death: Cyprus
- Height: 1.79 m (5 ft 10 in)
- Position: Midfielder

Senior career*
Years	Team	Apps	(Gls)
1989	North York Rockets	25	(14)
1990–1991	Radnički Niš	16	(7)
1991-1994	Mačva Šabac		
1994–1997	Aris Limassol	75	(15)
1997–2000	Anorthosis Famagusta	63	(14)
2000–2002	AEL Limassol	36	(4)
2002	Aris Limassol	12	(2)
2003	Anorthosis Famagusta	9	(2)
2003–2004	Aris Limassol	7	(1)

International career
2002–2003	Cyprus	5	(0)

Managerial career
- 2012–2013: Feutcheu
- 2013–2014: Union Douala
- * Club domestic league appearances and goals

Vladan Tomić (18 May 1967 – 19 October 2016) was a professional footballer and coach. Born in Yugoslavia, he represented Cyprus at international level as a player.

== Playing career ==
Born in Ševarice, SR Serbia, SFR Yugoslavia, during his early career he played with North York Rockets in the Canadian Soccer League, and then, in 1990-91 with FK Radnički Niš in the Yugoslav First League, Besides these clubs already mentioned, he also played with FK Mačva Šabac. In 1994 he moved to Cyprus where he represented Aris Limassol, Anorthosis Famagusta and AEL Limassol.

=== International ===
Between 2002 and 2003 he played 5 matches for the Cypriot national team.

== Managerial career ==
After retiring, he became a manager, and had a coaching career in Cameroon. In July 2013, Tomić was named the manager of the Cameroonian side Union Sportive Douala for the 2013–14 season.

He died on 16 October 2016 while in Cyprus. He was buried in the local cemetery of his birthplace, Ševarice, in Serbia.
