= Manuel Bilches =

Argentine footballer and manager

Personal information
- Full name: Manuel Reinaldo Bilches
- Date of birth: 25 May 1957 (age 69)
- Place of birth: Argentina
- Position: Forward

Senior career*
Years	Team	Apps	(Gls)
1974	Hamilton-Italo Canadians		

Managerial career
- 1990: America United
- 1993: Windsor Wheels
- 1999–2001: Belize
- 2006: PSM Makassar
- 2011–2012: Curaçao
- * Club domestic league appearances and goals

Manuel Bilches (born 25 May 1957) is an Argentine football manager and former player.

== Playing career ==
Bilches began playing at the youth level with Mendoza. A forward, he had stints with Independiente Rivadavia, Huracán Las Heras, and Deportivo Goudge in his native Argentina. In 1972, he moved to Canada and had a trial with the Toronto Metros in the North American Soccer League. He began playing in the National Soccer League in 1974, where he played with Hamilton-Italo Canadians. After a season in Hamilton, he traveled to Western Canada to train with the Vancouver Whitecaps.

In 1977, he started playing in the Alberta Major Soccer League with Edmonton Victoria. Throughout the season, he was selected to the Edmonton Select team, which faced Eintracht Braunschweig. After the conclusion of the summer season, he played in the Edmonton Indoor Soccer League with Edmonton Croatia during the 1978 winter season. He trained with California Surf and played in several preseason matches the following season.

In 1979, he resumed playing in the local Alberta soccer circuit with Northwest United. He re-signed with Northwest the following season.

== Managerial career ==
Bilches began transitioning to the managerial side by becoming the player-coach for Team Argentina in the 1978 Mini World Cup soccer tournament. In the winter of 1980, he served as the head coach for Edmonton Italo-Canadians in the Edmonton District Soccer Association's indoor league. In 1990, he returned to the province of Ontario to manage America United in the National Soccer League. He was the head coach for NSL rivals Scarborough International for the 1991 season. He continued coaching in the NSL in 1993 when he was hired by Windsor Wheels in the preseason. Unfortunately, his stint in Windsor was short-lived as he was dismissed after the arrival of new ownership.

The Ontario Soccer Association named Bilches as their under-15 provincial head coach in 1995. He began managing the Honduran side Atlético Independiente during the 1997–98 season. After his stint in Honduras, he managed at the international level in 1999 when he was named the head coach for the Belize national football team and managed the squad throughout the 1999 UNCAF Nations Cup. The Football Federation of Belize renewed his contract in late 1999 and also served as the head coach for the under-23 national team. Bilches received some criticism during his time with the national team as several players disagreed over his coaching style.

In 2005, he was named the technical director for Persipura Jayapura in the Liga Indonesia Premier Division, where the club claimed the championship title against Persija Jakarta. He would return to manage in Indonesia in late 2006, where he signed with PSM Makassar and extended his contract for the 2007 season. Unfortunately, he resigned from his position before the commencement of the 2007 season.

In 2011, he was named the head coach for Curaçao. Throughout his tenure with Curaçao, the team failed to advance past the group stage in the 2014 FIFA World Cup qualification.
