= Jim McLoughlin =

English-born Canadian soccer player

Personal information
- Full name: James Louis McLoughlin
- Date of birth: 5 February 1957 (age 69)
- Place of birth: Liverpool, England
- Position: Defender

Senior career*
Years	Team	Apps	(Gls)
1978–1980	New York Arrows (indoor)	37	(4)
1979	Toronto Metros-Croatia	0	(0)
1979	Toronto Emerald		
1979–1980	Rochester Lancers	23	(0)
1980–1981	Philadelphia (indoor)	24	(4)
1981	Hamilton Steelers		

International career
1976–1979	Canada U23	2	(0)
- * Club domestic league appearances and goals

Jim McLoughlin (born February 5, 1957) is an English-born Canadian soccer player who played as a defender.

== Career ==
McLoughlin played in the Major Indoor Soccer League with the New York Arrows. In 1979 he signed with Toronto Metros-Croatia in the North American Soccer League. After failing to make an appearance for Toronto he played at the amateur level with Toronto Emerald. He later returned to the North American Soccer League to play with the Rochester Lancers. In the winter of 1980, he joined indoor rivals the Philadelphia Fever.

In 1981, he played in the National Soccer League with Hamilton Steelers where he assisted in securing the double (NSL Championship & regular season title) for Hamilton. He retired from professional soccer the following season due to knee injuries. In 1995, he was inducted into the Brampton Sports Hall of Fame.

== International career ==
McLoughlin made his debut for the Canada men's national under-23 soccer team on April 1, 1979 against Bermuda in a qualifier match for 1979 Pan American Games. He was named to the Canada roster for the 1976 Summer Olympics.

== Managerial career ==
McLoughlin managed several amateur clubs like FC Pennsylvania, and Patriot FC.
