= David McGill (soccer) =

Canadian soccer player

Personal information
- Date of birth: 28 May 1960 (age 66)
- Place of birth: Vancouver, British Columbia, Canada
- Position: Midfielder

Senior career*
Years	Team	Apps	(Gls)
1979	Vancouver Whitecaps	0	(0)
1980	Detroit Express	27	(0)
1980–1981	Detroit Express (indoor)	14	(0)
1981	Washington Diplomats	29	(4)
1986-1987	Edmonton Brick Men	16+	(0)
1989	Victoria Vistas	20	(1)
1990	Ottawa Intrepid	24	(0)

International career
1979	Canada U20	4	(0)
- * Club domestic league appearances and goals

David McGill (born 28 May 1960) is a Canadian former professional soccer player who played in the North American Soccer League between 1979 and 1981 for the Vancouver Whitecaps, Detroit Express and Washington Diplomats. McGill also earned four caps for the Canadian under-20 side in 1979, and participated at the 1979 FIFA World Youth Championship. In 1986, he played for the Edmonton Brick Men in the Western Soccer Alliance. He played for the Victoria Vistas in 1989.
