= Shel Brodsgaard =

Canadian soccer player

Personal information
- Date of birth: May 29, 1970 (age 56)
- Place of birth: Victoria, British Columbia, Canada
- Position: Goalkeeper

Senior career*
Years	Team	Apps	(Gls)
1987	Edmonton Brick Men	0	(0)
1989–1990	Victoria Vistas	23	(0)
1990–1991	Tacoma Stars (indoor)	1	(0)
1991	Nova Scotia Clippers	27	(0)
1992	North York Rockets	11	(0)
	Winnipeg Fury		(0)
	Hvidovre IF		(0)

International career
1989	Canada	1	(0)
- * Club domestic league appearances and goals

Shel Brodsgaard (born May 29, 1970) is a Canadian former professional goalkeeper.

== Early life ==
Brodsgaard began playing soccer with the Gorge Youth Soccer Association and represented British Columbia at U16 and U18 Provincial All-Star levels.

== Club career ==
He signed his first professional contract at age 15, with the Edmonton Brick Men of the Canadian Soccer League. He later played with the Victoria Vistas, Nova Scotia Clippers, and North York Rockets. He also played with the Tacoma Stars of the Major Indoor Soccer League. He also played for the Winnipeg Fury and Danish side Hvidovre IF. Prior to joining the Rockets, he had a trial with Danish club Boldklubben 1909.

== International career ==
He made one appearance for the Canadian national team. He was a member of the 1992 Canadian Olympic Qualifying team, but did not make an appearance. He won a gold medal at the 1989 Jeux de la Francophonie.

== Coaching career ==
He has served as the Goalkeeper Coach for the Canada women's national soccer team as well as the women's youth teams from 2000 to 2006. He became Canada's National Goalkeeping Coach in 2004.

As an assistant coach, with the Simon Fraser University women's team, he won the 2001 NAIA championship.

In 2019, he had the opportunity to be a guest coach and learn from the Olympique Lyonnais women's team coaches.

He currently serves as the Technical Director for the Upper Island Riptide Soccer Association.

== Personal ==
He graduated from the University of Victoria. He is the author of two books: Guarding the Goal and Goals and Dreams: A Celebration of Canadian Women's Soccer.
