= Peter Gilfillan =

Canadian soccer player

Personal information
- Full name: Peter Gilfillan
- Date of birth: December 29, 1965 (age 60)
- Position: Defender

Youth career
- 1986–1990: Wilfrid Laurier University

Senior career*
Years	Team	Apps	(Gls)
1987	Toronto Blizzard	20	(0)
1988	Hamilton Steelers	21	(0)
1989	Ottawa Intrepid	21	(0)
1990–1991	Kitchener Spirit	48	(1)
1992	North York Rockets	20	(0)

International career
1985	Canada U20	3	(0)
1990-1991	Canada	1	(0)
Medal record
Representing Canada
Men's Association football
North American Nations Cup
Winner	1990 Canada
Third place	1991 United States
- * Club domestic league appearances and goals

Peter Gilfillan (born 29 December 1965) is a former professional Canadian soccer defender.

== Club career ==
Peter was drafted to the North American Soccer League by the Toronto Blizzard in 1983. He was a member of the Toronto Blizzard from 1983 to 1987 (NASL and CSL). In 1988 he played for the Hamilton Steelers in the Canadian Soccer League. After leaving Wilfrid Laurier University in 1990 he joined Ottawa Intrepid of the Canadian Soccer League. He also played for the Kitchener Spirit/Kickers and the North York Rockets in the CSL. Peter was selected Canadian University CIAU/CIS All Canadian All-star for all 4 years in University from 1986 to 1990. He worked for Umbro Soccer and Adidas Canada after retiring from the game. He also served as the general manager at an online recruitment company.

== International career ==
Peter was a member of the U19 Canadian team in 1984. The U19 team was CONCACAF finalists in Trinidad & Tobago - where the team qualified for the World Youth Cup in Russia along with Mexico in 1984. Gilfillan played all three of Canada's games at the 1985 FIFA World Youth Championship, in a side that also comprised Alex Bunbury. He was member of the Men's Gold medal Canada National team at the Francophone games 1988 in Morocco, Africa and was selected to represent the Canadian World Cup team - 3 Nations Cup in Vancouver – versus USA and Mexico 1990 and; selected to represent the Canadian World Cup team - 3 Nations Cup in Los Angeles versus USA and Mexico 1991 and; selected to represent the Canadian at the CONCACAF Gold Cup, Los Angeles 1991. He made his senior debut for Canada in a July 1991 CONCACAF Gold Cup match against Jamaica. Peter is a member of the Canadian Soccer Hall of Fame.

== Honours ==
Canada

- North American Nations Cup: 1990; 3rd place, 1991
