= Victoria Vistas =

Former soccer team in Victoria, British Columbia

- Nickname: Vistas
- Founded: 1989
- Dissolved: 1990
- Stadium: Royal Athletic Park
- Coach: Bruce Wilson
- League: Canadian Soccer League

The Victoria Vistas were a professional soccer team based in Victoria, British Columbia that competed in the original Canadian Soccer League. The Vistas joined the CSL for the 1989 season and folded after the 1990 season. Victoria All-star teams had been competitive with league champion Vancouver 86ers teams in pre-season contests during previous years.

== History ==
The Vistas joined the Canadian Soccer League as an expansion team for the 1989 season, forming a natural rivalry with the Vancouver 86ers. The Vistas were coached by Brian Hughes (until August 1) and former Canada national team captain Bruce Wilson, with Buzz Parsons serving as general manager.

The Vistas struggled in their inaugural season, winning only 4 of their 26 matches, finishing last in their division. Despite their poor results, during a match preview versus Winnipeg Fury, July 20, 1989, the Vistas were noted as averaging about 2,000 spectators per game. Victoria Vistas played an exhibition game against the Seattle Storm August 3, 1989, at Memorial Stadium as part of the Western Soccer League's exhibition schedule, losing by a score of 3–0.

On May 5, 1990, the Vistas played an away exhibition friendly against the Seattle Storm, losing by a score of 3–0. On Wednesday August 1, 1990, the Victoria Vistas defeated the Storm 1-0 via a 35th minute Allan Evans penalty kick, with the win giving them the inaugural non-league Stena Lines Cup title. Stena Lines had been the team's kit sponsor for the 1989 and 1990 seasons.

Their second season in the CSL was more successful, finishing second in their division during the 1990 season and qualifying for the playoffs. They defeated the Winnipeg Fury in penalty kicks in the quarter-final, before falling to eventual champions Vancouver 86ers in the semi-finals. The team folded following the 1990 season.

The team's folding in 1990 was the end of professional soccer in the city, until 2019 when Pacific FC joined the Canadian Premier League. Pacific FC honoured the Vistas at a match during their inaugural season, with several of the Vistas players on hand for the ceremony.

== Seasons ==
Season	Tier	League	Record	Rank	Playoffs	Ref
1989	1	Canadian Soccer League	4–6–16	5th, West	Did not qualify	
1990	1	Canadian Soccer League	12–7–7	2nd, West	Semi-Finals	

== Notable players ==
- (Canada) Geoff Aunger
- (Canada) Iain Baird
- (Canada) Bob Bolitho
- (Canada) Ian Bridge
- (Canada) Shel Brodsgaard
- (Scotland) Allan Evans
- (Canada) (Wales) John Hughes
- (Nigeria) (United States) Ernest Inneh
- (United States) Rick Iversen
- (Canada) Rick Jasken
- (England) (Canada) Simon Keith
- (Scotland) Gerry McCabe
- (Canada) David McGill
- (Canada) George Pakos
- (Canada) Randy Ragan
