= London Lasers =

Canadian soccer team

- Full name: London Lasers Soccer Club
- Nickname(s): Lasers
- Founded: 1990
- Dissolved: 1992
- Stadium: JW Little Memorial Stadium
- League: Canadian Soccer League

The London Lasers were a professional soccer team in London, Ontario, Canada that played in the original Canadian Soccer League in 1990 and 1992.

== History ==
The London Lasers were founded in 1990 as an expansion franchise in the Canadian Soccer League. The club spent a great deal of money to secure out of town players for their debut season and had a crowd of approximately 2700 people for their opening match against the Toronto Blizzard. However, crowds quickly dwindled to sizes of 200, with many complimentary tickets given out, putting the club under tremendous financial strain, in which they were forced to trade many of their more expensive players to the Hamilton Steelers. They also played an exhibition match against London City of the National Soccer League for local bragging rights, winning by a score of 3–2. The team finished the season with only 2 wins across their 26 matches to finish last in the division and the league. The club requested a leave of absence for the 1991 season, before officially folding in March.

In 1992, the Lasers were set to be re-founded by local businessman, Bob Facca. However, the new team folded prior to the start of the 1992 season, following a non-appearance of the North York Rockets for an exhibition game, when it became clear that Facca would not be able to make the financial commitment necessary to operate a team in the national professional league. However, the Canadian Olympic squad, under coach Paul James was recruited to make a team to play under the London Lasers name for 1992. The Lasers narrowly missed the playoffs, amid rumours that the team was told to cut their expenses by the league. By the end of the season, average attendance had increased to approximately 400 spectators and interest for the team was growing in the season; however, the league folded following the season after the defection of three of the league's six franchises - Vancouver 86ers, Montreal Supra and the Toronto Blizzard to the US-based American Professional Soccer League. Winnipeg and North York joined the NSL, with the Lasers being the only one of the six CSL clubs to fold completely upon the dissolution of the league.

== Seasons ==
| Season | Tier | League | Record | Rank | Playoffs | Ref |
|---|---|---|---|---|---|---|
| 1990 | 1 | Canadian Soccer League | 2–7–17 | 7th, East | Did not qualify | |
| 1991 | Team did not operate | | | | | |
| 1992 | 1 | Canadian Soccer League | 6–7–7 | 5th | Did not qualify | |

== Notable players ==
- (Canada) Brian Ashton
- (Canada) Geoff Aunger
- (Canada) Nico Berg
- (Canada) Jeff Cambridge
- (England) Len Cantello
- (Canada) Pat Cubellis
- (Canada) Jason de Vos
- (Canada) Stevie Gill
- (Canada) Lucio Ianiero
- (Canada) Paul James
- (Canada) Dino Lopez
- (Scotland) Steve Morris
- (Iran) (Canada) Peyvand Mossavat
- (Nigeria) Boniface Okafor
- (Canada) Giuliano Oliviero
- (Canada) Bryan Rosenfeld
- (United States) Brad Smith
