= Robert Gemert =

Surinamese footballer

Personal information
- Date of birth: 7 August 1951 (age 75)
- Place of birth: Paramaribo, Dutch Surinam
- Position: Striker

Senior career*
Years	Team	Apps	(Gls)
1974	Toronto Macedonia		
1976	Toronto Metros-Croatia (indoor)		
1976	Toronto Metros-Croatia	2	(0)
1977	Toronto Italia		
1979–1980	Buffalo Stallions (indoor)	9	(0)
1981	Hamilton Steelers		
1989	Hamilton Steelers	4	(0)
- * Club domestic league appearances and goals

Robert Gemert (born August 7, 1951) is a Surinamese former footballer who played as a forward.

== Career ==
Gemert would play abroad in the summer of 1974 in Canada's National Soccer League with Toronto Macedonia.

He played in the North American Soccer League in 1976 with Toronto Metros-Croatia. He also played with the team during the indoor season. In 1977, he played in the National Soccer League with Toronto Italia. In 1978, he returned to the North American Soccer League to sign with Rochester Lancers. On April 19, 1978, the Lancers released him from his contract. For the remainder of the 1978 season, he returned to the NSL to play with the Buffalo Blazers.

In the winter of 1979, he played in the Major Indoor Soccer League with the Buffalo Stallions. In 1981, he returned to the National Soccer League to play with Hamilton Steelers. He had another stint with Hamilton in the Canadian Soccer League during the 1989 season.
