= Franco Lofranco =

Canadian soccer player and coach

Frank Lofranco
Personal information
- Date of birth: February 2, 1969 (age 57)
- Place of birth: Toronto, Ontario, Canada
- Height: 1.83 m (6 ft 0 in)
- Position: Midfielder

Senior career*
Years	Team	Apps	(Gls)
1986	Toronto Italia		
1987–1988	Toronto Blizzard	24	(1)
1989	North York Rockets	8	(1)
1991	North York Strikers		
1992–1993	Toronto Blizzard	19	(2)

International career
1985	Canada U17	6	(0)
1987	Canada U20	1	(0)

Managerial career
- 2003–2007: Ottawa Fury Women
- * Club domestic league appearances and goals

Frank Lofranco (born February 2, 1969) is a Canadian former soccer player and head coach.

== Career ==
Lofranco played in the National Soccer League with Toronto Italia in 1986. The following season he played in the Canadian Soccer League with Toronto Blizzard. After two seasons with the Blizzard he was traded to the North York Rockets. In 1991, he returned to the National Soccer League to play with North York Strikers. In 1992, he returned to play with the Toronto Blizzard in their final season in the Canadian Soccer League. He played the following season with Toronto in the American Professional Soccer League, where he appeared in 19 matches and recorded two goals.

== International career ==
Lofranco made his international debut for the Canada men's national under-17 soccer team on May 13, 1985, against Costa Rica at the 1985 CONCACAF U-17 Championship. In 1987, he played with the Canada men's national under-20 soccer team at the 1987 Pan American Games.

== Managerial career ==
Lofranco was named the head coach in 2003 for the Ottawa Fury Women in the USL W-League. In 2008, he resigned from his position as Fury head coach. In 2008, he became the technical director for the Ottawa Fury.
