= Ray Flannigan =

English footballer

Personal information
- Full name: Raymond John Flannigan
- Date of birth: 15 March 1949
- Place of birth: Margate, Kent, England
- Date of death: 24 October 2015 (aged 66)
- Place of death: London, Ontario, Canada
- Position: Defender

Youth career
- Margate County

Senior career*
| Years | Team | Apps | (Gls) |
| 1966 | Arsenal | 0 | (0) |
| 1966–1970 | Margate | 83 | (5) |
| 1970–1972 | Reading | 46 | (1) |
| 1972–1973 | Ramsgate | | |
| 1973–1974 | Bexley | | |
| 1973–1974 | Gravesend & Northfleet | | |
| 1974 | London City SC | | |
| 1975–1976 | Cambridge | | |
| 1976–1979 | London City SC | | |
| 1980–1981 | Ramsgate | | |
| 1982 | Hamilton Steelers | | |
- * Club domestic league appearances and goals

Ray Flannigan (born 15 March 1949 – 24 October 2015) was an English footballer.

== Playing career ==
Flannigan began his career at the youth level with Margate County, and in 1965 signed as an amateur with Arsenal F.C. In 1966, he signed with Margate F.C. in the Southern League Premier Division. He made his debut on 10 October 1966 against Folkestone F.C. In 1970, he signed with Reading F.C. in the English Third Division. After two seasons with the Royals he returned to Non-League football with Ramsgate F.C. in 1972.

He later spent time with Bexley, and Gravesend & Northfleet. In 1974, he played abroad in the National Soccer League with London City, and after season in Canada he played with Cambridge City F.C. He returned to London City in 1976, and played several seasons before retiring in 1981 with Ramsgate in the Kent League. In 1982, he returned to the National Soccer League to play with Hamilton Steelers.

== Personal life ==
His father Jock Flannigan was a former footballer who spent time with Margate F.C. He later immigrated to Canada, and worked as a mason. He died on 25 October 2015 in London, Ontario.
