= Jens Kraemer =

Canadian soccer player and coach (born 1963)

Personal information
- Full name: Jens Kraemer
- Date of birth: 14 July 1963 (age 63)
- Place of birth: Hamburg, West Germany
- Position: Defender

Senior career*
Years	Team	Apps	(Gls)
1980–1983	London City		
1983	Toronto Nationals		
1984–1987	London Marconi		
1987–1993	North York Rockets	125+	(8+)
1994	Toronto Rockets	5	(0)
1995	Toronto Italia		
1996	Oakville Western Canadians		

Managerial career
- 1997–1999: Oshawa Adria
- 1999: Oshawa Flames
- 2000–2002: Markham SC
- 2004–2006: Canada U15 (women)
- 2022–: Darby FC
- * Club domestic league appearances and goals

Jens Kraemer (born July 14, 1963) is a Canadian former soccer player and head coach who is currently the head coach for the semi-professional club Darby.

== Playing career ==
Kraemer began his career in 1980 in the National Soccer League with London City. In 1983, he played with the Toronto Nationals of the Canadian Professional Soccer League. In 1984, he played with London Marconi for four seasons. In 1988, he played in the Canadian Soccer League with the North York Rockets. After a six-year tenure in the CSL he signed with the Toronto Rockets of the American Professional Soccer League. In total he would appear in five matches for the club.

In 1995, he signed with Toronto Italia of the Canadian National Soccer League. The following season he signed with Oakville Western Canadians, and made his debut for the club on June 2, 1996, in a match against North York Talons.

== Managerial career ==
In 1997, he was the head coach for Oshawa Adria in the Motor City Soccer League. In 1999, he was appointed the head coach for Oshawa Flames of the Canadian Professional Soccer League. The following season he coached in the Ontario Soccer League with Markham SC. In 2004, he served as the head coach to Canada's women U-15 national team. He was also named the head coach for Whitby Iroquois SC.

In 2011, he was named a regional scout for TFC Academy in the Durham region. In 2016, he was named as an assistant coach for the Durham College soccer team.

He joined Darby FC as an assistant coach, becoming head coach in 2022.
