= Pat Cubellis =

Canadian soccer player

Personal information
- Date of birth: 7 February 1967 (age 59)
- Place of birth: Toronto, Canada
- Position: Striker

Senior career*
Years	Team	Apps	(Gls)
- University of Toronto
1986	Panhellenic Olympics		
1987	North York Rockets	19	(2)
1990	London Lasers	25	(2)
1990	Panhellenic Olympics		

International career
1983	Canada U17	2	(3)
1985	Canada U20	9	(1)
1986	Canada	4	(0)
- * Club domestic league appearances and goals

Pat Cubellis (born 7 February 1967) is a Canadian former soccer player who earned four caps for the national team in 1986.

In 1986, he played in the National Soccer League with Panhellenic Olympics. In 1987, he played for North York Rockets. In 1990, he played for London Lasers. In late 1990, he returned to his former team Panhellenic Olympics.
