= Pat Sullivan (soccer) =

Canadian former soccer player (born 1971)

Personal information
- Date of birth: 20 March 1971 (age 55)
- Place of birth: Belfast, Northern Ireland
- Position: Defender

Senior career*
Years	Team	Apps	(Gls)
1991	Nova Scotia Clippers	17	(2)
1992	North York Rockets	17	(0)
1994	Toronto Rockets	10	(1)
1999	Oshawa Flames		
2000	Glen Shields Sun Devils		
2001	Durham Flames		
- * Club domestic league appearances and goals

Pat Sullivan (born 20 March 1971) is a Canadian former soccer player who played in the Canadian Soccer League, American Professional Soccer League, and the Canadian Professional Soccer League.

== Playing career ==
Sullivan began his career in 1991, in the Canadian Soccer League with Nova Scotia Clippers. In 1992 he was a member of the North York Rockets. After the demise of the CSL he signed with the Toronto Rockets of the American Professional Soccer League. He made his debut for the club on July 8, 1994 in a match against the Seattle Sounders. In total he appeared in ten matches and recorded one goal for the club.

In 1999, Sullivan would sign with expansion franchise Oshawa Flames of the Canadian Professional Soccer League. The following season he signed with the Glen Shields Sun Devils, and made his debut on May 31, 2000 in a match against Toronto Croatia. He would help the Sun Devils finish fourth in the overall standings and clinch a playoff berth. In the quarterfinals the team faced London City, and advanced to the next round by winning a penalty shootout, where Sullivan successful converted a penalty kick. In the semi-finals Glen Shields faced Toronto Olympians, but unfortunately lost the match by a score of 1-0. In 2001, he returned to Oshawa, but failed to secure a postseason berth.
