= Rick Jasken =

Canadian soccer player (born 1965)

Personal information
- Date of birth: September 26, 1965 (age 61)
- Place of birth: Port Alberni, British Columbia, Canada
- Height: 1.70 m (5 ft 7 in)
- Position: Forward

College career
Years	Team	Apps	(Gls)
1986–1987	Victoria Vikings		

Senior career*
Years	Team	Apps	(Gls)
1988	Vancouver 86ers	1	(0)
1988–1989	Victoria West FC		
1989–1990	Victoria Vistas	26	(3)
1990–1991	Victoria Croatia		

International career
1989	Canada	4	(3)
Medal record
Representing Canada
Men's soccer
Francophone Games
Gold medal – first place	Morocco 1989
- * Club domestic league appearances and goals

Rick Jasken (born September 26, 1965) is a Canadian former soccer player who played as a forward.

== University and club career ==
Jasken was born in Port Alberni, British Columbia, and attended the University of Victoria. There, he played soccer for the Victoria Vikes, where he helped them win the CIAU men's soccer championship against the Wilfrid Laurier Golden Hawks in 1987, scoring in the final and being included in that year's CIAU all-Canadian team.

In 1988, he made one appearance as a substitute for the Vancouver 86ers, as they won that season's Canadian Soccer League. He then spent the next two seasons at the Victoria Vistas, where he scored three goals in 26 matches.

Additionally, he also played in the Vancouver Island Soccer League's Jackson Cup, where he played in six finals in a row, two each for the Victoria Vikings, Victoria West FC, and Victoria Croatia.

== International career ==
Jasken made four appearances for the Canadian men's national team in 1989, representing them at that year's Francophone Games, where he scored three goals, including one against Burkina Faso and two in the final against Morocco, as they finished the tournament as gold medalist.

In 2012, he was inducted into the Canada Soccer Hall of Fame as part of the 1989 Francophone Games squad.
