= Ardo Perri =

Italian-Canadian soccer player (born 1950)

Personal information
- Date of birth: September 23, 1950 (age 76)
- Place of birth: Nicastro, Italy
- Position: Goalkeeper

Youth career
- Mohawk College

Senior career*
Years	Team	Apps	(Gls)
1975	Rochester Lancers	18	(0)
1980–1982	Philadelphia Fever (indoor)	31	(0)
1982–1983	Buffalo Stallions (indoor)	32	(0)
1979–1983	Hamilton Italo-Canadians/Steelers		
- * Club domestic league appearances and goals

Ardo Perri is a retired Italian-Canadian soccer goalkeeper who played professionally in the North American Soccer League and Major Indoor Soccer League.

Born in Italy, Perri attended Mohawk College in Canada where he played on the men's soccer team. He played both goalkeeper and as forward. In his second season with the Mountaineers, he led the Ontario Colleges Athletic Association with the lowest goals against average and was the team's second leading scorer. He was inducted into the school's Hall of Fame in 2009. In 1975, he played for the Rochester Lancers in the North American Soccer League. In 1979, he played in the National Soccer League with Hamilton Italo-Canadians. He continued playing with Hamilton once the team was renamed the Hamilton Steelers, and assisted in securing the double (NSL Championship & regular season title) in 1981. In 1983 he played in the Canadian Professional Soccer League when Hamilton became a charter member. He also played amateur ball with the Hamilton Italo-Canadians.

In 2013, he was inducted into the Hamilton Soccer Hall of Fame.
