= Mirosław Piękoś =

Polish footballer

Personal information
- Date of birth: 18 May 1963 (age 63)
- Place of birth: Mielec, Poland
- Height: 1.71 m (5 ft 7 in)
- Position: Midfielder

Senior career*
Years	Team	Apps	(Gls)
1986–1987	Stal Mielec	5	(0)
1988	North York Rockets	23	(2)
1989	Ottawa Intrepid	23	(2)
1990	Kitchener Spirit	24	(1)
1991	North York Rockets	7	(0)
1991	Hamilton Steelers	4	(0)
1993	Richmond Hill Kick		
- * Club domestic league appearances and goals

Mirosław Piękoś (born 18 May 1963) is a Polish former footballer who played as a midfielder.

== Career ==
Piękoś played in the Ekstraklasa with Stal Mielec during the 1986–87 season. In 1988, he played abroad in the Canadian Soccer League with North York Rockets. The following season he signed with league rivals Ottawa Intrepid. After a season with Ottawa, he was transferred to Kitchener Spirit for the 1990 season. In 1991, he was traded to his former club North York Rockets for future considerations.

In July 1991, he was placed on waivers with Hamilton Steelers signing him, and appeared in four matches. In 1993, he played in the Canadian National Soccer League with Richmond Hill Kick.
