= Stevie Gill =

Canadian soccer player (born 1973)

Personal information
- Full name: Stephen Thomas Gill
- Date of birth: September 8, 1973 (age 53)
- Place of birth: Scarborough, Ontario, Canada
- Position: Defender

Senior career*
Years	Team	Apps	(Gls)
1992	Toronto Blizzard	1	(0)
1991	Hamilton Steelers	0	(0)
1992	London Lasers	17	(1)
1993	Toronto Blizzard	10	(0)
1994–1996	Toronto Croatia		
2000	Toronto Olympians	3	(0)
2001	Durham Flames		

International career
1991–1992	Canada U-20	8	(0)

Managerial career
- 2002–2003: Durham Storm (assistant coach)
- 2003–2007: Grand Canyon Antelopes (assistant coach)
- 2008–2015: Grand Canyon Antelopes women
- * Club domestic league appearances and goals

Stevie Gill (born September 8, 1973) is a Canadian former soccer player who played in the Canadian Soccer League, American Professional Soccer League, Canadian International Soccer League, and Canadian Professional Soccer League.

After his retirement from soccer he began managing as an assistant coach in the CPSL, and later at the college level with Grand Canyon University.

== Playing career ==
Gill started his career in 1987 in the Canadian Soccer League with the Toronto Blizzard. He was traded to the Hamilton Steelers in 1991, and appeared in two playoff games. Once the season came to a conclusion Hamilton folded and he signed with the London Lasers. In 1993, he returned to the Toronto Blizzard which joined the American Professional Soccer League. During his tenure with Toronto he appeared in 10 matches. In 1994, he signed with Toronto Croatia in the Canadian International Soccer League, and won the league championship in 1995, and 1996.

In 2000, he competed in the Canadian Professional Soccer League with the Toronto Olympians. During his tenure with the Olympians he won the CPSL League Cup and the regular season championship. He featured in the CPSL Championship final against Toronto Croatia, but lost the match to a score of 2–1. The following season he was traded to the Durham Flames.

== International career ==
In 1991, he made his debut for the Canada men's national under-20 soccer team against Honduras at the 1991 Pan American Games. In total he would feature in eight matches, and participated in the 1992 CONCACAF U-20 Tournament.

== Managerial career ==
Gill would conclude his playing career with Durham in 2002, as he was assigned the position of assistant coach to Durham. In 2003, Gill was named the position of assistant coach to Grand Canyon University men's and women's soccer team. In 2008, he was appointed the Grand Canyon University women's soccer team head coach, and resigned in 2015
