= Gordon Hill (footballer) =

English footballer and manager

Personal information
- Full name: Gordon Alec Hill
- Date of birth: 1 April 1954 (age 72)
- Place of birth: Sunbury-on-Thames, Middlesex, England
- Height: 5 ft 7 in (1.70 m)
- Position: Winger

Youth career
- Queens Park Rangers
- Southend United
- 1971–1972: Staines Town
- 1972: Slough
- 1972–1973: Southall

Senior career*
Years	Team	Apps	(Gls)
1973–1975	Millwall	91	(22)
1975	→ Chicago Sting (loan)	21	(16)
1975–1978	Manchester United	101	(39)
1978–1979	Derby County	24	(5)
1979–1981	Queens Park Rangers	14	(1)
1981–1982	Montreal Manic	36	(18)
1981–1982	Montreal Manic (indoor)	16	(29)
1982	Chicago Sting	26	(9)
1982–1983	Chicago Sting (indoor)	11	(10)
1983	San Jose Earthquakes (indoor)	4	(2)
1983	New York Arrows (indoor)	22	(10)
1983	Inter-Montreal	?	
1983–1984	Kansas City Comets (indoor)	50	(50)
1984–1985	Tacoma Stars (indoor)	19	(11)
1985–1986	Twente	19	(4)
1986	HJK Helsinki	2	(2)
1986–1988	Stafford Rangers	?	(?)
1988	Northwich Victoria	24	(8)
1990	Radcliffe Borough	3	(0)
1991	Nova Scotia Clippers	15	(4)
Total		495	(139)

International career
1972	England Youth	3	(0)
1976	England U23	1	(1)
1978	England B	6	(4)
1976–1977	England	6	(0)

Managerial career
- 1991: Nova Scotia Clippers
- 2001: Chester City
- 2002: Hyde United
- * Club domestic league appearances and goals

Gordon Alec Hill (born 1 April 1954) is an English former footballer who played in the Football League for Millwall, Manchester United, Derby County and Queens Park Rangers, and was capped six times for the England national team.

== Player ==
In 1971, after leaving Kenyngton Manor School in Sunbury on Thames, Hill began his club career in 1972 with Southall of the Athenian League as a 17-year-old. He drew the attention of Millwall and signed with them in 1973. Known to The Lions fans as 'Merlin', the Millwall youngster was a skilful player who entertained the fans with his dribbling and shooting.

He played 91 league games for Millwall, scoring 22 goals. After spending the summer of 1975 on loan with the North American Soccer League's Chicago Sting, and being named All League, Hill subsequently signed for Manchester United in November 1975 for £70,000, forming a wing partnership with Steve Coppell.

Hill helped United reach the 1976 FA Cup Final, scoring both goals with long-range efforts in the semi-final at Hillsborough Stadium against Derby County. United lost in the final against Southampton. He was also part of the 1977 FA Cup-winning side. Hill left United for Derby County for £250,000 in 1978, with his sale by Dave Sexton deeply unpopular with supporters. At the time of his sale, Hill was United's top scorer and a favourite among fans.

He spent two seasons with Derby County, most of it sidelined with a knee injury suffered in one of his first games, before moving to Queens Park Rangers in November 1979 in a £150,000 deal. He played his last Qpr game in late september and with Tommy Docherty's sacking in early october He transferred for £80,000 to Montreal Manic of the NASL in January 1981. After a successful first season with the Manic, he began the 1982 season in Montreal, but after five games the Manic sent him to the Chicago Sting. In the fall of 1982, the Sting entered the Major Indoor Soccer League for the winter indoor season. Hill began the season with the Sting, and moved to the San Jose Earthquakes after eleven games. In January 1983, the Earthquakes turned around and traded Hill and Gary Etherington to the New York Arrows in exchange for Steve Zungul. In the summer of 1983, Hill played for Inter-Montreal of the Canadian Professional Soccer League.

In the autumn of 1983, Hill signed with the Kansas City Comets of MISL. He played one season with the Comets, then began the 1984–85 season before being released. In December 1984, he signed with the Tacoma Stars.

He joined FC Twente in the Dutch Premier Division for the 1985–86 season, playing 19 times and scoring four goals. He spent the summer of 1986 in Finland with HJK Helsinki, scoring two goals in as many appearances before returning to England where he played under his former teammate Stuart Pearson at Northwich Victoria, as well as at AFC Bournemouth, Stafford Rangers and Radcliffe Borough.

== Manager ==
In the summer of 1991, Hill was managing director, Head Coach and Player of the Nova Scotia Clippers in the team's only year in the Canadian Soccer League, where he took the club to the playoffs. In 2001, he briefly managed Chester City during their spell in the Football Conference, and had a short spell managing Hyde United. He was the Director of coaching (Boys) for Cleveland United SC 2012–13.

In 2010, The Sunday Times reported that Hill returns to the UK several times a year with groups of players to play games in the Manchester area.

== International career ==
During his career, Hill played at every level for England: as an amateur, youth, under 23, England B and full International, at which level he won six full caps between 1976 and 1977.

== Honours ==
=== Club ===
Manchester United

- FA Cup: 1976–77; runner-up: 1975–76
- FA Charity Shield: 1977

=== Individual ===
- NASL 1st All-Star team: 1975
- Manchester United top scorer: 1976–77, 1977–78

== Personal life ==
Following his playing career, Hill relocated to the United States, settling in Washington state, where he works in youth football coaching.

Hill has a son, Sam, and a daughter. Sam also played football, featuring for Chester City during the 2001–02 Football Conference season while Gordon managed the club, and later played for Otago United in New Zealand.
