= Boniface Okafor =

Nigerian footballer

Personal information
- Date of birth: January 15, 1966 (age 60)
- Place of birth: Nigeria
- Height: 5 ft 9 in (1.75 m)
- Position: Forward

College career
Years	Team	Apps	(Gls)
1988–1990	West Florida Argonauts		

Senior career*
Years	Team	Apps	(Gls)
1990	London Lasers	1	(0)
1992	Miami Freedom		
- Penang FA
- Standard FC
- Klagenfurt
- Hannover 96
- * Club domestic league appearances and goals

Boniface Okafor (born January 15, 1966) is a Nigerian former footballer.

Okafor attended the University of West Florida where he played soccer from 1988 to 1990. He was a 1990 NAIA Second Team All American. In 2007, Okafor was inducted into the Argonauts Hall of Fame.

In 1990, he played for the London Lasers. In 1992, he signed with the Miami Freedom of the American Professional Soccer League. He played a handful of games before being waived on July 5, 1992. He then played for several teams, including Penang FA in Malaysia, Standard FC in Nigeria and Klagenfurt in Austria. He eventually settled with Hannover 96 in the Second Bundesliga. On March 4, 1996, the Tampa Bay Mutiny selected Okafor in the third round (twenty-fourth) overall of the 1996 MLS Supplemental Draft. The Mutiny waived him in April.
