= Ralph Golen =

Polish footballer

Personal information
- Full name: Rafal Golen
- Date of birth: July 7, 1970 (age 56)
- Place of birth: Stalowa Wola, Poland
- Position: Midfielder

Senior career*
Years	Team	Apps	(Gls)
1986–1993	North York Rockets	84	(3)
1994	Toronto Rockets	4	(0)
1995	Toronto Italia	7	(0)
1996	Oakville Western Canadians	5	(0)
1997–1998	Toronto Lynx	40	(0)
1997–1998	Montreal Impact (indoor)	3	(0)
- * Club domestic league appearances and goals as of 1 February 2015

Rafal "Ralph" Golen is a former Polish footballer. He played the majority of his career in Canada particularly in the USL A-League and the Canadian National Soccer League.

== Playing career ==
Golen began his professional soccer in 1987 with the North York Rockets of the Canadian Soccer League. His greatest success with North York was in 1991 when they defeated the Nova Scotia Clippers with a 9-1 goal aggregate to advance to the league cup semi-finals. In 1994, North York re-branded itself as the Toronto Rockets and moved from the Canadian National Soccer League to the American Professional Soccer League. After finishing last in the standings, the Rockets folded from the league due to a financial dispute with the league's front office. He returned to the CNSL in 1995 by signing with Toronto Italia. He made his debut for the club on August 7, 1995 in a cup match against London City. In 1996, he signed with Oakville Canadian Westerns. He reached the playoffs with Oakville by finishing fourth in the league standings. He featured in the semi-final match against Toronto Italia, but unfortunately were eliminated by the eventual playoff champions by a score of 5-4 goals on aggregate.

In April, 1997 he signed with newly expansion franchise the Toronto Lynx of the USL A-League, his signing was announced in a press conference which revealed the team roster. Golen made his debut for the club on April 12, 1997 in the Lynx's first official match against Jacksonville Cyclones; the game would eventually result in a 3-1 defeat for the fledgling side. Golen assisted the club in qualifying for the post season for the first time in the franchise's history, by finishing 4th in the Northeastern division. The Lynx were eliminated in the first round of the playoffs against the Montreal Impact. He returned to the Lynx the following year where he appeared in 17 matches, but failed to make the post season by finishing second last in their division.

During the winter of 1998 he signed with the Montreal Impact indoor team which operated in the National Professional Soccer League, he appeared in 3 matches.

== Personal life ==
Golen is the father of professional player, Nicola Golen.
