= Football at the 1989 Jeux de la Francophonie =

1989 Football at the Jeux de la Francophonie
Tournament details
- Host country: Morocco
- City: Casablanca
- Teams: 10 (from 3 confederations)
- Venue: 1 (in 1 host city)

Final positions
- Champions: Canada (1st title)
- Runners-up: Morocco
- Third place: Congo
- Fourth place: France

Tournament statistics
- Matches played: 16
- Goals scored: 58 (3.63 per match)

Each nation brought their under-20 teams to compete in a group and knockout tournament. The top teams and the best second placed team advanced to the knockout stage of the competition. Canada won the tournament after a 4-1 win against the host nation Morocco.

== Group stage ==
=== Group A ===
| Team | Pld | W | D | L | GF | GA | GD | Pts |
|---|---|---|---|---|---|---|---|---|
| Morocco (H) | 3 | 3 | 0 | 0 | 6 | 1 | +5 | 6 |
| Congo | 3 | 1 | 0 | 2 | 4 | 4 | 0 | 2 |
| Madagascar | 3 | 1 | 0 | 2 | 6 | 7 | −1 | 2 |
| Chad | 3 | 1 | 0 | 2 | 5 | 9 | −4 | 2 |

(H) Hosts

| Morocco | 2–0 | Madagascar |

| Chad | 2–1 | Congo |

| Morocco | 3–1 | Chad |

| Congo | 3–1 | Madagascar |

| Madagascar | 5–2 | Chad |

| Morocco | 1–0 | Congo |

=== Group B ===
| Team | Pld | W | D | L | GF | GA | GD | Pts |
|---|---|---|---|---|---|---|---|---|
| Canada | 2 | 1 | 1 | 0 | 3 | 1 | +2 | 3 |
| Ivory Coast | 2 | 1 | 1 | 0 | 2 | 1 | +1 | 3 |
| Burkina Faso | 2 | 0 | 0 | 2 | 2 | 5 | −3 | 0 |

| Canada | 3–1 | Burkina Faso |
|---|---|---|
| Gilbert 25', 58'; Jasken 40' | | 84' |

| Ivory Coast | 2–1 | Burkina Faso |

| Canada | 0–0 | Ivory Coast |

=== Group C ===
| Team | Pld | W | D | L | GF | GA | GD | Pts |
|---|---|---|---|---|---|---|---|---|
| France | 2 | 2 | 0 | 0 | 8 | 2 | +6 | 4 |
| Senegal | 2 | 1 | 0 | 1 | 4 | 5 | −1 | 2 |
| Gabon | 2 | 0 | 0 | 2 | 2 | 7 | −5 | 0 |

| France | 4–1 | Gabon |

| Senegal | 3–1 | Gabon |

| France | 4–1 | Senegal |

== Knockout stage ==
Semi-finals
19 July-
Morocco | 3
France | 0
19 July-
Canada | 2
Congo | 1

Final
22 July-
Morocco | 1
Canada | 4
Third place
22 July-
France | 2
Congo | 3

== Semi-finals ==
19 July 1989

| Morocco | 3–0 | France |

19 July 1989

| Canada | 2–1 | Congo |
|---|---|---|
| Gilbert 8'; Mobilio | report | 40' |

Attendance: 20,000

== Third place match ==
22 July 1989

| France | 2–3 | Congo |

== Final ==
22 July 1989

| Canada | 4–1 | Morocco |
|---|---|---|
| Hooper 15'; Jasken 34', 36'; Holness 44' | report | Moumaris 40' |

Attendance: 55,000

== See also ==
- Football at the Jeux de la Francophonie
