= Nova Scotia Clippers =

Former soccer team in Halifax, Nova Scotia

- Full name: The Nova Scotia Clippers
- Nickname(s): Clippers
- Founded: 1991
- Dissolved: 1991
- Stadium: Beazley Field
- Chairman: Stan Brechin
- Head Coach: Gordon Hill
- League: Canadian Soccer League
- 1991: 6th

The Nova Scotia Clippers were a professional soccer team based in the original Canadian Soccer League. They were based in Halifax, Nova Scotia, but played their matches in Dartmouth, Nova Scotia at Beazley Field. They played only a single season in 1991.

== History ==
In 1989, an expansion franchise for the Canadian Soccer League was awarded to the Nova Scotia Professional Soccer Society, which would debut two years later in 1991. They were the first professional soccer team in the Halifax area.

The club played their home matches at Beazley Field in Dartmouth, Nova Scotia, after the city of Halifax was not interested in hosting the team at Wanderers Grounds. Dartmouth spent $25,000 in improvements to the field, in anticipation of the Clippers arrival. Their head coach and general manager was Gordon Hill. They played their first home match on May 26, 1991, against the Vancouver 86ers, in front of a crowd of 1,891 spectators, finishing in a 0–0 draw. In September 1991, the club played two exhibition matches against the Bermuda national team.

The club finished their debut season with a record of 7 wins, 7 ties, and 14 losses, finishing sixth in the eight team league. The team advanced to the playoffs, losing in the first round to the North York Rockets. The club averaged around 1,500 fans per game, although many tickets were handed out for free. There were discussions about moving the team's home field to Wanderers Grounds in Halifax for 1992, however the team folded after the 1991 season due to lack of interest.

After the team folded, the Halifax region was without professional soccer for 27 years, until HFX Wanderers FC joined the new Canadian Premier League.

== Season ==
Season	Tier	League	Record	Rank	Playoffs	Ref
1991	1	Canadian Soccer League	7–7–14	6th	Quarter-Final	

== Players ==
- (Canada) Shel Brodsgaard
- (England) Gordon Hill
- (Canada) Tom Kouzmanis
- (Canada) Dino Lopez
- (England) Mick Lyons
- (Canada) Tony Pignatiello
- (Canada) Pat Sullivan
