= Ševarice =

Ševarice Шеварице (Serbian)
- Village (Selo)
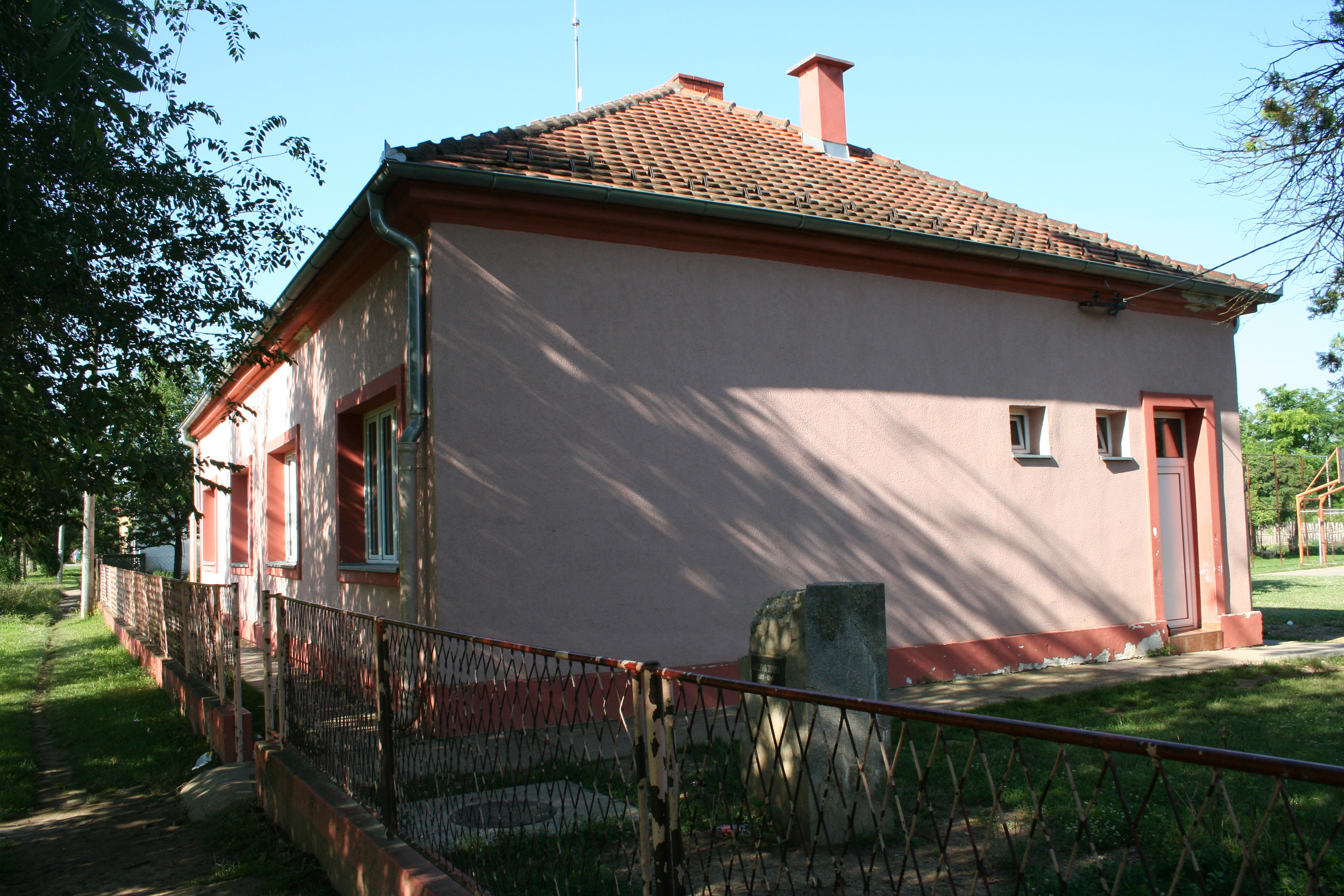

- Location within Serbia
- Coordinates: 44°52′02″N 19°39′33″E
- Country: Serbia
- Statistical Region: Šumadija and Western Serbia
- Region: Mačva
- District: Mačva District
- Municipality: Šabac
- Time zone: UTC+1 (CET)
  - Summer (DST): UTC+2 (CEST)

Ševarice (Serbian Cyrillic: Шеварице) is a village in Serbia. It is situated in the Šabac municipality, in the Mačva District. The village has a Serb ethnic majority and its population numbering 1,308 people (2002 census).

== History ==
Sevarice is a very old village and there is not any reliable evidence of when it was founded. However, traces of the Roman civilization have been discovered in many places in today's village Sevarice. It is well known that this village was mentioned in “Monastery Ravanica's praise of Duke Lazar” in 1381, but with another name. The names of residents were changed with starting and finishing their migration to and from the village. In written historic recourses which have been saved up to the present, this village has been mentioned for the first time in a census completed in 1548, but it was named Orasac. The village was located on the place of today's estate.

In the next census from 1718, which was done by an Australian colonel Nipert, the village consisted of 19 households. In a census from 1788 as a part of Macva duchy, it was mentioned as Orasac, too. According to these reviews it can be understood how the village developed. On the first sight it seems that development of the village was slow. However, in the whole history not only of the village but of Serbia too, there were always different kinds of wars and migrations. It can't be reliably claimed when the village changed its name and the location. By all accounts the location must have been changed before the name. For instance, the village Orasac was situated on the main road from Mitrovica to Sabacand, at the same time on the waterway of the small river Bitva. That was very inconvenient for the people of the village, concerning the permanent changes of conquerors, especially the Turkish ones. That is why the citizens of the village and the latter settlers left the location and moved to the southeastern parts of the country, towards the area covered with the forests and bushes. In that way they were hidden from the main road and the possible danger. People cut the trees down and then built their houses there. That is the reason why the village got its name Sevarice ("bushes" in English). That was a long-term process and it is not known when it ended.

Making squares and straight streets in Macva was started during the reign of Duke Milos ( the ruler ) and his brother Jevrem, who made strong pressure on the people of Macva, especially in the villages around the roads to build their houses in strict rows. Macva's villages look like villages in Srem ( Voivodina ) – two streets make the main square in a shape like the cross. There were four squares that older residents still remember: Arlovica, Djunis, Skolski sor, Preki sor. Beside these squares as the main roads, there were smaller narrow streets. Sevarice got its Municipality in 1839, soon after setting the municipal law from 1839. Uzvece, a small village near Sevarice, also belonged to the Municipality of Sevarice. At the beginning of the nineteenth century, Sevarice was headquarters of Macva1s area. The first chairman was captain Great from Drenovac. The church of the “Holy Mother of God “ (Velike Gospojine), built in 1936, still remains and people can visit it every day on masses etc.

There has been a school in Sevarice since the first half of 19th century, actually since 1928. It was the first village school in Macva and was located on Djuricici's hill. The school also was attended by the pupils from the villages nearby: Drenovac, Pricinovic, Tabanovic and Uzvece. There were 17 teachers in Sevarice since its foundation until World War I started. The first teacher was Novak Popovic. After World War II, in 1952 “Zadruzni Dom” was built which is a one-storey-high building in the centre of the village, according to typical projects in Serbia. There is a local government office, a big and a small auditorium, a few business premises and a couple of rooms on the first floor. The first Collective farm in Sevarice was founded in 1926. It was one of the first associations in Macva. During its foundation collective farm consisted of 12 members and the first president was Zivan Sainovic. It had a purchasing type. According to the census of 2002 the number of citizens changed in this way: 1948 – 1648, 1953–1668, 1961–1640, 1971–1582, 1981–1452, 1991–1295. Today there are 1308 citizens living in Sevarice and about 370-380 households.

== See also ==
- List of places in Serbia
- Mačva
