= Simon Keith =

British/Canadian soccer player (born 1965)

Simon Keith CM
Personal information
- Full name: Simon Keith
- Date of birth: 25 May 1965 (age 61)
- Place of birth: Lewes, England
- Height: 5 ft 8 in (1.73 m)
- Position: Forward

Youth career
- 1971–1983: Lansdowne Soccer Association

College career
Years	Team	Apps	(Gls)
1984–1985	Victoria Vikings		
1987–1989	UNLV Rebels		

Senior career*
Years	Team	Apps	(Gls)
1983–1984	Bromley FC		
1989	Victoria Vistas	22	(5)
1990	Montreal Supra	9	(1)
1990	Winnipeg Fury	11	(0)
1989–1990	Cleveland Crunch (indoor)	52	(6)
- * Club domestic league appearances and goals

Simon Sean Keith CM (born 25 May 1965) is a British/Canadian soccer player. He is the first athlete to have played professional sports after having undergone a heart transplant.

To raise awareness for organ donation, he founded the Simon Keith Foundation in 2011.

== Early life and education ==
Simon Keith was born on 25 May 1965, to David Keith, and Sylvia. The family moved to Victoria, British Columbia, Canada in 1967. He played his youth soccer for the Victoria Boys Club and later the Lansdowne Evening Optimists. He went to Mount Douglas Secondary School from 1981 to 1983, where he played on a soccer team with notable teammates Jeff Mallett and John Hughes.

He subsequently gained a scholarship to play soccer at the University of Victoria for the Vikings soccer team where in 1984 he was diagnosed with myocarditis, a deterioration of the heart muscle.

In 1986, he was the recipient of a heart transplant, the donor being 17 year old Jonathan Edward, from Newport, Wales, who had died while playing soccer. The surgery was done in Papworth Hospital outside London by Dr. Mohsin Hakim and Sir Terence English. He then became the first athlete to have played professional sports after having undergone a heart transplant.

== Sports career ==
Following recovery from his surgery, Keith moved to Las Vegas in 1987 to attend the University of Las Vegas where he played soccer for the UNLV Rebels with his older brother Adam. Keith won numerous awards at UNLV including the Student-Athlete of the Conference and USA's Most Courageous Athlete. Keith was the number one overall pick in the 1989 professional indoor soccer draft. by the Cleveland Crunch of the Major Indoor Soccer League (MISL). Keith also played professionally for the Victoria Vistas, the Winnipeg Fury and Montreal Supra of the Canadian Soccer League.

== Speaker ==
At the age of 50 he said:

Within me beats the heart of an incredible young Welsh athlete, whose loss of life enabled me to live mine. Since receiving this gift of life, I have dedicated my time advocating for organ donation awareness and the benefits of living an active lifestyle following an organ transplant.

Keith spoke at the White House in 2016 as part of President Obama's Organ Summit. Keith has also spoken at the Canadian and British Parliaments and travels the world telling his story and inspiring others. Keith is now the CEO of the Simon Keith Foundation, founded to increase awareness of organ donor awareness and educate transplant recipients. Keith is one of the longest-living heart transplant recipients and has lived the majority of his life with his second heart. In March 2019, Keith underwent his second heart transplant surgery along with a kidney transplant.

Keith belongs to the Southern Nevada Sports Hall of Fame and the Greater Victoria Sports Hall of Fame. In 2017, he was honored as Canada's Humanitarian of the Year. In 2022, Keith was awarded the prestigious Silver Rebel Award as a member of the University of Nevada, Las Vegas Athletic Hall of Fame.

== Second heart transplant ==
In March 2019 he received a second heart transplant and a new kidney in San Diego.

== Simon Keith Foundation ==
To raise awareness for organ donation, he founded the Simon Keith Foundation in 2011. Since its founding The Simon Keith Foundation has raised millions of dollars in support of the families of youths who have undergone organ transplants as well as raise awareness for organ donation. In 2021 The Simon Keith Foundation announced two scholarships. In partnership with the Southern Nevada Sports Hall of Fame, The Simon Keith Foundation will award a scholarship to a graduating high school senior whose life has been affected by organ donation or transplantation. In Canada, The Simon Keith Foundation has partnered with the Greater Victoria Sports Hall of Fame and the University of Victoria to offer a similar scholarship. Both awards will be endowed and awarded annually in perpetuity.

Keith was appointed to the Order of Canada in 2022 "for his inspirational advocacy of organ donation and for his dedicated support for transplant recipients."

== Personal and family ==
Keith is married to Kelly and they have three children.
