= Lists of Canadian international soccer players =

The following are lists of Canadian international soccer players:

- List of Canada men's international soccer players
- List of Canada women's international soccer players
