= Paolo Ceccarelli =

Canadian soccer player (born 1969)

Personal information
- Date of birth: October 12, 1969 (age 57)
- Place of birth: Toronto, Ontario, Canada
- Height: 5 ft 11 in (1.80 m)
- Position: Goalkeeper

Youth career
- Toronto Jets

Senior career*
Years	Team	Apps	(Gls)
1987–	Dunfermline Athletic		
1988–1992	North York Rockets	73	(0)
1993	Toronto Blizzard	23	(0)
1993–1994	Dundee	0	(0)
1994	Berwick Rangers	1	(0)
1994–2000	Montreal Impact	80	(0)
1996–1997	Toronto Shooting Stars (indoor)	6	(0)
1997–1999	Montreal Impact (indoor)	56	(1)
2000–2001	Toronto Thunderhawks (indoor)	27	(0)
2001–2002	Harrisburg Heat (indoor)	14	(0)
2002–2003	Brampton Hitmen	19	(0)
2002–2003	Kansas City Comets (indoor)	31	(0)

International career
1991–1992	Canada U-23	10	(0)
- * Club domestic league appearances and goals

Paolo Ceccarelli (born October 12, 1969) is a Canadian retired soccer player who played as a goalkeeper. He was the 1996 A-League Goalkeeper of the Year.

== Club ==
Ceccarelli played for the Toronto Jets during his youth. In September 1987, he signed with Dunfermline Athletic after the coaching staff noticed Ceccarelli when Dunfermline played an exhibition game against the Jets. By 1989, Ceccarelli was back in Canada, playing for the Toronto Blizzard in the Canadian Soccer League. In 1991, he moved to the North York Rockets. In twenty-six games, he earned a 1.05 goals against average which placed him top of the goalkeeper chart and earned him All Star recognition. Ceccarelli was back with the Blizzard in 1993, this time playing in the American Professional Soccer League. In the fall of 1993, he became a backup goalkeeper with Dundee F.C. before moving to Berwick Rangers F.C. for one game. In the spring of 1994, Ceccarelli moved to the Montreal Impact. In 1996, he was First Team All League and the APSL Goalkeeper of the Year. In addition to playing outdoors with the Impact, Ceccarelli spent the 1996-1997 winter season with the Toronto Shooting Stars of the National Professional Soccer League. He was back with the Impact for the 1997 outdoor season, earning Second Team All League honors. Montreal entered the NPSL the next two winter seasons (1997-1999) and Ceccarelli remained with them for those competitions. In the summer of 1999, the Impact went on hiatus and Ceccarelli spent the summer coaching the Impact's youth clubs. He then lost the entire 2000 outdoor season with a knee injury. He returned to playing that fall with the Toronto Thunderhawks of the NPSL. In July 2001, Ceccarelli returned to the Impact for one last outdoor game. In 2001, Ceccarelli signed with the Harrisburg Heat of the second Major Indoor Soccer League.

In 2002, Ceccarelli signed with the Brampton Hitmen of the Canadian Professional Soccer League. The signing was announced on April 30, 2002. He recorded his first clean sheet against London City on June 8, 2002. He featured in 19 matches for the Hitmen, but the club failed to reach the postseason by finishing sixth in the standings of the Western Conference. He returned to Brampton the following year and his signing was announced on June 6, 2003. Unfortunately he suffered a leg injury which resulted in him serving as a backup goalkeeper for Roy Blanche, which eventually led to his release midway through the season. In September 2002, the Heat traded Ceccarelli to the Kansas City Comets in exchange for Chris Damico. Ceccarelli retired at the end of the season.

== International ==
In 1991 and 1992, Ceccarelli played ten games with the Canada men's national under-23 soccer team in its unsuccessful Olympic qualification campaign.

== Managerial career ==
He was the head coach for Canada Beach Soccer which competed in the 2022 World Winners Cup, a non-FIFA beach soccer tournament.
