= Bob Colville =

English footballer

Personal information
- Full name: Robert John Colville
- Date of birth: 27 April 1963 (age 63)
- Place of birth: Nuneaton, Warwickshire, England
- Height: 5 ft 10 in (1.78 m)
- Position: Striker

Senior career*
Years	Team	Apps	(Gls)
–1984	Rhos United		
1984–1986	Oldham Athletic	32	(4)
1986–1987	Bury	11	(1)
1987–1989	Stockport County	71	(20)
1989–1990	York City	24	(0)
1990	Kitchener Spirit	16	(5)
- Spennymoor United
- Bangor City
- Barrow
- Guiseley
–1995	Bangor City		
1995	Guiseley		
1995	→ Bangor City (loan)		
Total		138	(25)

International career
- Wales Semi-Pro
- * Club domestic league appearances and goals

Robert John Colville (born 27 April 1963) is a former professional footballer who played as a striker in the Football League for Oldham Athletic, Bury, Stockport County and York City, in non-League football for Spennymoor United, Barrow and Guiseley, in Welsh football for Rhos United and Bangor City and in Canada with Kitchener Spirit. He was a Wales semi-pro international.
