= Marek Grabowski (footballer) =

Polish footballer

Personal information
- Date of birth: January 20, 1964 (age 62)
- Place of birth: Lewin Brzeski, Poland
- Height: 1.77 m (5 ft 10 in)
- Position: Forward

Senior career*
Years	Team	Apps	(Gls)
1981–1983	Metal Grodków		
1984–1990	Moto Jelcz Oława		
1991	North York Rockets	28	(10)
1992–1998	Moto Jelcz Oława		
1998–2001	Polar Wrocław		
2001	Śląsk Wrocław	3	(0)
2002–2004	Polar Wrocław	68	(7)
2004	Śląsk Wrocław		
2004–2005	Foto-Higiena Oława		
2005–2007	Foto-Higiena Gać		
2007–2008	Polonia Miłoszyce		
- * Club domestic league appearances and goals

Marek Grabowski (born 20 January 1964) is a Polish former professional footballer who played as a forward.

== Career ==
He began his career in Poland with Metal Grodków before moving to Moto Jelcz Oława.

In 1991, he joined the North York Rockets of the Canadian Soccer League, where he scored 10 goals in 28 appearances. He won the Top Newcomer Award for the 1991 CSL season.

Afterwards, he returned to Poland, where he played for Moto Jelcz Oława and Polar Wrocław. In 2001, he joined Śląsk Wrocław. He made his first league appearance as a substitute in a 1–0 win over Legia Warsaw on 21 July 2001 at the age of 37 years and 182 days, making him the oldest player to make an Ekstraklasa debut in the 21st century, and the second oldest in the league's history. He returned to Polar soon after. He served as team captain for Polar and became a player-coach in 2003.

In 2004, after head coach Tadeusz Pawłowski was dismissed, he was one of four players removed from Polar. While no reason was given for his removal, it was unofficially known that the club managers did not like that he was one of a few players who consistently demanded payment of outstanding salaries. He received a letter from the club that he was no longer to play for the club, but was barred from training for any other team without their permission, including the reserves, despite previously saying he would be allowed to play for the second team. Grabowski submitted a letter to Polar and the Polish Football Association, demanding the termination of his contract due to unpaid wages. Late in January, the training ban was revoked and he was free to train with other clubs. In February, his contract was officially terminated by mutual consent.

Afterwards, he returned to Śląsk Wrocław. In 2004, he was charged in connection with a match-fixing scandal in connection with his former club Polar.
