= Dino Lopez =

Canadian retired soccer player (born 1969)

Personal information
- Date of birth: January 13, 1969 (age 57)
- Place of birth: Kingston, Jamaica
- Height: 6 ft 0 in (1.83 m)
- Position: Defender

Youth career
- 1989: York University

Senior career*
| Years | Team | Apps | (Gls) |
| 1987–1989 | Toronto Italia | | |
| 1990 | London Lasers | 12 | (0) |
| 1990 | Kitchener Spirit | 2 | (0) |
| 1990 | Hamilton Steelers | 9 | (0) |
| 1991 | Nova Scotia Clippers | 27 | (4) |
| 1992 | London Lasers | 16 | (1) |
| 1993 | Montreal Impact | 15 | (0) |
| 1994 | Toronto Rockets | 11 | (0) |
| 1995–1998 | Milwaukee Rampage | 54 | (7) |
| 1995–1996 | Buffalo Blizzard (indoor) | 7 | (1) |
| 1996–1997 | Toronto Shooting Stars (indoor) | 10 | (0) |
| 1998 | Toronto Olympians | 13 | (1) |

International career
| 1992 | Canada | 1 | (0) |

Managerial career
- 2002–2006: Oakville S.C. (U-12 Development Director)
- 2006–2012: Oakville S.C. (Head Coach Girls U-16)
- 2012–: Oakville S.C. (Technical Director)
- * Club domestic league appearances and goals

Dino Lopez (born 13 January 1969 in Kingston, Jamaica) is a Canadian retired soccer player who played in the National Soccer League, Canadian Soccer League, American Professional Soccer League, USISL A-League, National Professional Soccer League, and the Canadian Professional Soccer League.

== Club career ==
The Jamaica-born defender was raised in North York, Ontario and has played in his career for York University who was named a 1989 OUA East All-Star. In 1987, he played in the National Soccer League with Toronto Italia, and ultimately played three seasons. In 1990, he played in the Canadian Soccer League for the London Lasers (1990, 1992), Nova Scotia Clippers (1991). He was an original member of the Montreal Impact. In 1994, he played for the Toronto Rockets, a team which lasted only one season in the APSL. In 1995, he signed with the Milwaukee Rampage where he would play the next three outdoor seasons. He retired following the 1997 season, but came out of retirement to play two games with the 1998 Rampage after injuries decimated the back line.

In addition to his outdoor career, Lopez also spent several seasons playing winter indoor soccer. In 1995, he signed with the Buffalo Blizzard of the National Professional Soccer League. He also spent the 1996-1997 NSPL season with the Toronto Shooting Stars. In 1998, he signed with the newly expansion franchise the Toronto Olympians in the newly formed Canadian Professional Soccer League. Throughout the 1998 CPSL season, Lopez achieved an undefeated streak with the Olympians the first club within the league to achieve this milestone. As well as winning the double by winning the regular season and the Open Canada Cup. The club reached the playoff finals but were defeated by the St. Catharines Wolves by 4–2 victory in a penalty shootout.

== International career ==
He won one cap for Canada, playing his only game on 3 September 1992 in Saint John, New Brunswick against the United States.

== Coaching career ==
From 2002 to 2006 Lopez was the U12 Development Director for the Oakville Soccer Club, and from 2006 to 2012 he coached the U-16 team. On July 24, 2012, the Oakville Soccer Club announced that he would take on the role of Technical Director at the club.

== Honors ==
=== Toronto Olympians ===
- Open Canada Cup (1): 1998
- Canadian Professional Soccer League Regular Season Champions (1): 1998
