= Toronto Rockets (soccer) =

- Nickname(s): Rockets
- Founded: 1994
- Dissolved: 1995
- Stadium: Centennial Park Stadium; Toronto, Ontario, Canada
- League: American Professional Soccer League

The Toronto Rockets were a professional soccer team based in Toronto, Ontario, Canada that competed in the American Professional Soccer League during the 1994 season, with their home stadium at Centennial Park Stadium.

== History ==
After the 1993 APSL season, the Toronto Blizzard folded and were replaced by the North York Rockets, who had played in the Canadian National Soccer League. This edition of the Rockets's roster was a combination of the 1993 Rockets and Toronto Blizzard, with players coming from both squads.

The Rockets finished in last place with a 5–15 record, as well as the worst attendance in the league, drawing in fewer than 1500 fans per match. The club had planned to return for the 1995 season, but withdrew only days before the start of the 1995 season, due to a financial dispute with the league's front office.

== Squad members ==
Note: Flags indicate national team as defined under FIFA eligibility rules; some limited exceptions apply. Players may hold more than one non-FIFA nationality.

| No. | Pos. | Nation | Player |
|---|---|---|---|
| 1 | GK | (Canada) CAN | Pat Onstad |
| 2 | DF | (Canada) CAN | Carl Fletcher |
| 3 | MF | | Jack Copetti |
| 4 | DF | (Canada) CAN | Peter Sarantopoulos |
| 5 | DF | (Canada) CAN | Jens Kraemer |
| 6 | DF | (Canada) CAN | Dino Lopez |
| 7 | MF | | Billy Dalombo |
| 8 | MF | (Canada) CAN | Lucio Ianiero |
| 9 | FW | (Liberia) LBR | Zico Doe |
| 10 | MF | (Canada) CAN | Tony Nocita |
| 11 | MF | | Alekxandre Choulaev |

| No. | Pos. | Nation | Player |
|---|---|---|---|
| 12 | GK | (Canada) CAN | Bryan Rosenfeld |
| 13 | MF | (Canada) CAN | Pat Sullivan |
| 14 | DF | (Canada) CAN | Joseph Majcher |
| 15 | FW | (Canada) CAN | Eddy Berdusco |
| 16 | MF | (Canada) CAN | Frank Cardona |
| 17 | MF | (Croatia) CRO | Velimir Crljen |
| 20 | FW | (Canada) CAN | Gino DiFlorio |
| 22 | MF | (Poland) POL | Ralph Golen |
| — | FW | (Croatia) CRO | Ivica Raguz |
| — | MF | (Canada) CAN | Robert Marcucci |
| — | MF | | ?? Walker |

== Coaches ==
- Peter Felicetti (until August 5)
- Hector Marinaro, Sr. (after August 5)
- David Gee (February–May, 1995)

== Season ==
| Season | League | Record | Rank | Playoffs | Ref |
|---|---|---|---|---|---|
| 1994 | American Professional Soccer League | 5–15 | 7th | Did not qualify | |

== See also ==
- North York Rockets
- Toronto Blizzard (1986–1993)
