= Tony Pignatiello =

Canadian soccer player

Personal information
- Date of birth: 29 April 1968 (age 58)
- Place of birth: Toronto, Ontario, Canada
- Position: Midfielder

College career
Years	Team	Apps	(Gls)
1989–1990	York Lions		

Senior career*
Years	Team	Apps	(Gls)
1987–1988	Toronto Italia		
1988	North York Rockets	19	(1)
1989–1991	Toronto Blizzard	13	(5)
1991	Nova Scotia Clippers	14	(0)
1991	Hamilton Steelers	2	(0)
1992	Toronto Blizzard	10	(0)

International career
1986–1986	Canada U20	14	(0)
1988	Canada	12	(1)
- * Club domestic league appearances and goals

Tony Pignatiello (born 29 April 1968) is a retired Canadian soccer player who played at both professional and international levels as a midfielder.

== Career ==
Pignatiello played club football for Toronto Italia, York Lions, North York Rockets, Toronto Blizzard and Nova Scotia Clippers. Pignatiello represented Canada at the 1987 Pan American Games and at the 1987 FIFA World Youth Championship.

Pignatiello earned twelve caps for the Canadian national side in 1988, scoring one goal.
