= Cosimo Commisso (soccer) =

Canadian soccer player

Personal information
- Date of birth: November 28, 1965 (age 60)
- Place of birth: Toronto, Ontario, Canada
- Position: Striker

Senior career*
| Years | Team | Apps | (Gls) |
| 1982 | Toronto Italia | | |
| 1986 | Toronto Italia | | |
| 1987–1988 | Hamilton Steelers | 24 | (3) |
| 1988–1992 | North York Rockets | 89 | (8) |

International career
| 1982–1985 | Canada U20 | 16 | (5) |
| 1988 | Canada | 5 | (0) |
- * Club domestic league appearances and goals

Cosimo Commisso (born November 28, 1965) is a Canadian former soccer player who earned five caps for the national team in 1988.

In 1982, he played in the National Soccer League with Toronto Italia, and was drafted by the Toronto Blizzard in 1983. He returned to former club Toronto Italia for the 1986 season. He played club football for the Hamilton Steelers and North York Rockets.
