= Drew Ferguson (soccer) =

Canadian soccer player

Personal information
- Full name: Andrew William Ferguson
- Date of birth: November 9, 1957 (age 68)
- Place of birth: Powell River, British Columbia, Canada
- Height: 1.80 m (5 ft 11 in)
- Positions: Midfielder; defender

Youth career
- Powell River Lions
- Leeds United

Senior career*
Years	Team	Apps	(Gls)
1978	Vancouver Whitecaps	1	(0)
1979–1982	Edmonton Drillers	80	(4)
1980–1982	Edmonton Drillers (indoor)	33	(32)
1982	Burton Albion		
1982–1983	Buffalo Stallions (indoor)	36	(11)
1983–1984	Cleveland Force (indoor)	44	(20)
1984–1985	New York Cosmos (indoor)	24	(6)
1985–1986	Chicago Sting (indoor)	38	(7)
1987	Edmonton Brick Men	20	(0)
1988–1990	Hamilton Steelers	45	(3)
1989–1990	Cleveland Crunch (indoor)	12	(0)
1990	Ottawa Intrepid	6	(0)
1990–1991	Kitchener Spirit/Kickers	26	(3)

International career^{‡}
1985–1991	Canada	10	(1)

Managerial career
- 1990: Ottawa Intrepid
- 1991: Kitchener Kickers
- 2004–: Canada Para team
Medal record
Representing Canada
Men's Association football
North American Nations Cup
Third place	1991 United States
- * Club domestic league appearances and goals as of 30 June 2009 ‡ National team caps and goals as of 30 June 2009

Drew Ferguson is a Canadian former soccer player. He was born in Powell River, British Columbia, Canada on November 9, 1957.

== Early life ==
He began playing soccer when he was five years old with the Powell River Lions. He also excelled in track and field, setting a record running the fastest mile for a 10-year-old in the world at 5:33.4. When he was 15, he participated in a soccer camp, where Leeds United player Jack Charlton was a guest coach. Charlton invited Ferguson to train with the club's youth program in West Yorkshire and took the young Canadian into his home.

== Club career ==
Ferguson received initial attention during the 1977 Canada Games where he scored in the final championship game. He started his North American Soccer League career with a single appearance for the Vancouver Whitecaps in 1978, but went on to appear in 80 games for the Edmonton Drillers from 1979 to 1982.

Over his 13 year career, Ferguson would go on to play for in Canada, the United States and England, playing for the Vancouver Whitecaps, Edmonton Drillers, Burton Albion, Hamilton Steelers, Kitchener Spirit/Kickers and indoor soccer with Buffalo Stallions, Cleveland Force, New York Cosmos, Chicago Sting, and Cleveland Crunch. During this time, he was named MVP three times.

== International career ==
Ferguson did not make his first appearance for the Canadian national soccer team until he was 27 years old in a 2–1 win over Trinidad and Tobago in Port of Spain in 1985. He made six appearances in friendly matches in 1985 but was not recalled again until 1989. His final cap came in a 0–2 defeat in a March 1991 North American Nations Cup match against the United States in Torrance, California.

=== International goals ===
Scores and results list Canada's goal tally first.

#	Date	Venue	Opponent	Score	Result	Competition
1	16 April 1989	Tórshavn, Faroe Islands	Faroe Islands	1–0	1–0	Friendly match

== Managerial career ==
Ferguson served as the head coach and general manager for the Kitchener Spirit of the Canadian Soccer League in 1991,

He currently serves as the coach for the Canadian Para soccer team.

== Honours ==
Canada

- North American Nations Cup: 3rd place, 1991
