= Mount Douglas Secondary School =

Location
- 3970 Gordon Head Road; Saanich, British Columbia, V8N 3X3; Canada; 48°28′17″N 123°19′6″W

Information
- School type: Public Secondary
- Motto: Non Sine Labore Premium (No reward without effort)
- Founded: 1931
- Sister school: Morioka Chuo High School, Morioka, Japan
- Principal: Ms. Heather Brown
- Grades: 9 to 12
- Enrollment: 849 (2021-2022)
- Area: School District 61 Greater Victoria
- Colours: Purple and Gold
- Mascot: Rambo the Ram
- Team name: Rams
- Website: mountdoug.sd61.bc.ca

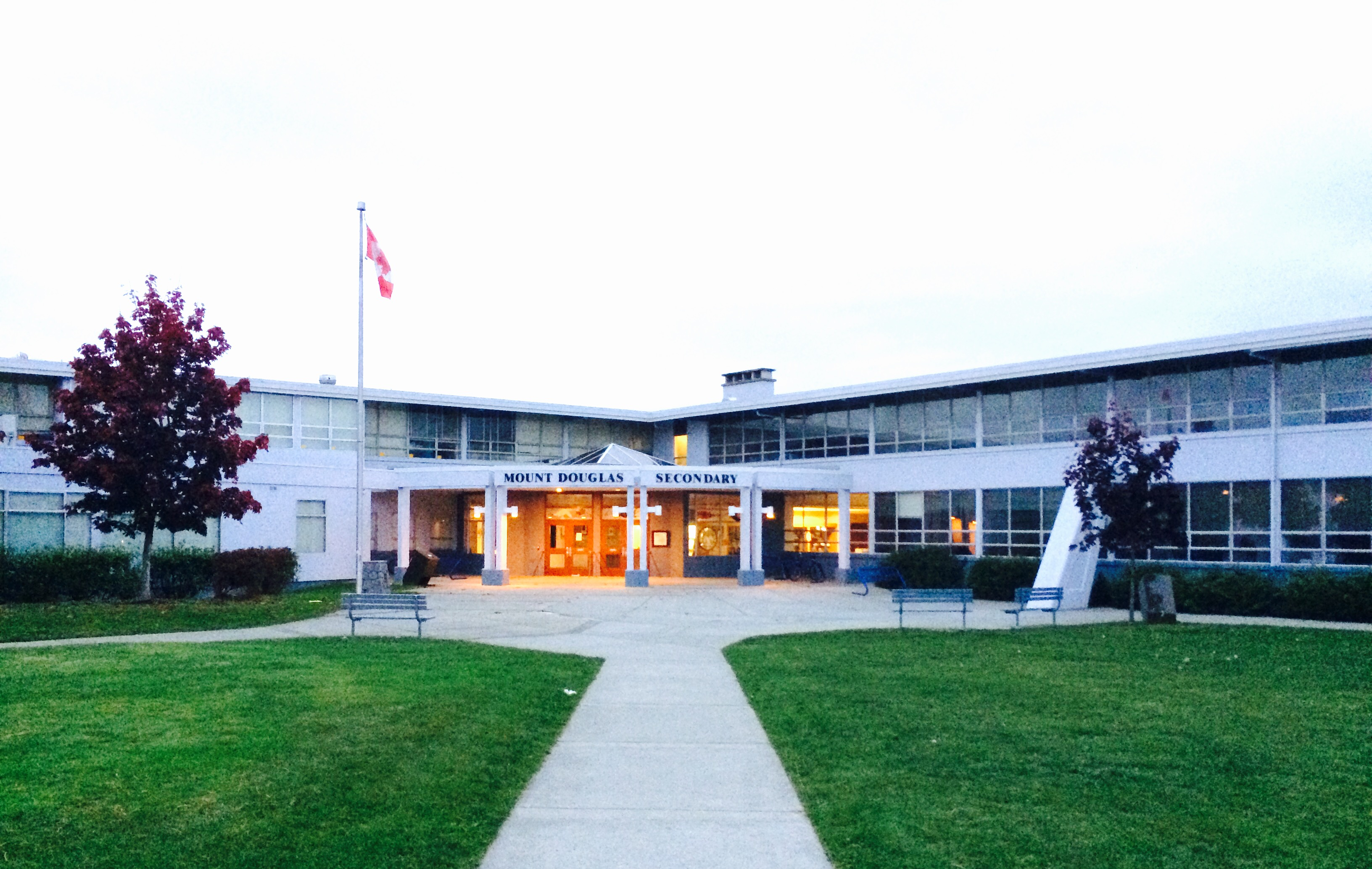
Mt. Doug SS, main entry 2015

Mount Douglas Secondary School is a four-year public secondary school founded 1931 and located in Saanich, British Columbia, Canada, with around 850 students on roll. The school is part of the Greater Victoria School District (SD61), and is known locally as "Mount Doug". In 2003, the school changed from a Senior Secondary model, teaching grades 11 and 12, back to the current and original grades 9 to 12 structure. The school was founded in 1931, and over the years has occupied several buildings beginning at the current Cedar Hill Middle School Campus. In 1970, it relocated to the former Gordon Head Junior Secondary School building after that school relocated to the newly constructed Arbutus Middle School campus.

== Academic programs ==
Mount Douglas Secondary is a host campus for the Challenge program, which offers gifted and talented students the opportunity to learn in a classroom environment adapted for a better education. To be accepted into the Challenge program, a student must apply, write a skills test and submit a portfolio of his or her achievements. After being accepted into the Challenge program, a student can choose to attend Mount Douglas or the other school in the district that offers the Challenge program, Esquimalt High School. Mount Doug also runs optional Honours and Advanced Placement programs in addition to the Challenge program. There are 81 full-time teachers employed at Mount Doug.

== Notable alumni ==
- Nelly Furtado - recording artist/songwriter (Class of 1996)
- Russ Courtnall - hockey player (Class of 1983)
- Michael J. Bryant - former Ontario Attorney General (Class of 1984)
- David Foster - music producer (Class of 1967)
- Steve Nash - (attended for two months only) NBA hall of famer
- Brent Hodge - film producer and director (Class of 2003)
- Riyo Mori - Miss Universe 2007
- Jeff Mallett - former president and COO of Yahoo! Inc.(Class of 1982)
- Robert Genn - artist/painter (Class of 1954)
- Mel Bridgman - hockey player
- Ida Chong - British Columbia MLA and Cabinet Minister
- Simon Keith - soccer player (Class of 1983)
- Atom Egoyan - film and theatre director
- Beau Mirchoff - actor
- Taya Valkyrie - Pro Wrestler, Longest Reigning Impact Knockouts Champion
