= Peter Sarantopoulos =

Canadian soccer player

Personal information
- Full name: Peter Sarantopoulos
- Date of birth: 2 May 1968 (age 58)
- Place of birth: Toronto, Ontario, Canada
- Position: Defender

Youth career
- Wexford SC

College career
Years	Team	Apps	(Gls)
1990–1992	Toronto Varsity Blues		

Senior career*
Years	Team	Apps	(Gls)
1988–1992	North York Rockets	99	(2)
1992	Winnipeg Fury	9	(0)
1993	Toronto Blizzard	24	(0)
1994	Toronto Rockets		
1996	St. Catharines Wolves	10	(0)
1996–1997	Toronto Shooting Stars (indoor)	29	(4)
1998	Toronto Lynx	23	(0)

International career^{‡}
1986–1987	Canada U20	13	(0)
1988–1993	Canada	33	(0)
1989	Canada futsal	3	(1)
Medal record
Representing Canada
Men's Association football
North American Nations Cup
Winner	1990 Canada
Third place	1991 United States
- * Club domestic league appearances and goals as of 22 June 2009 ‡ National team caps and goals as of 22 June 2009

Peter Sarantopoulos (born 2 May 1968) is a former Canadian international soccer defender.

== Club career ==
Sarantopoulos was a two-time First Team and one-time Second Team Canadian Interuniversity Sport All-Canadian with the University of Toronto Varsity Blues.

He played for the North York Rockets in the Canadian Soccer League from 1988 to 1992, where he was named a league All-Star in 1991 and 1992. During the 1992 season, he was traded to the Winnipeg Fury.

He played for Toronto Blizzard during the 1993 American Professional Soccer League season, as well their replacements the Toronto Rockets for the APSL's 1994 campaign.

In 1996, he signed with St. Catharines Wolves of the Canadian National Soccer League. He made his debut on 2 June 1996 in a match against Toronto Italia. With St. Catharines, he won the CNSL Cup and reached the playoff finals, but were defeated by Toronto Italia. In the winter of 1996 he played at the indoor level with Toronto Shooting Stars in the National Professional Soccer League.

Sarantopoulos played the 1998 season in the Toronto Lynx in the USISL A-League.

== International career ==
Sarantopoulos played for Canada at the 1987 FIFA World Youth Championship and the 1987 Pan American Games. He made his senior debut for Canada in a February 1988 friendly match against Bermuda. He earned a total of 33 caps, scoring no goals. He has represented Canada in 6 FIFA World Cup qualification matches. He also played at the inaugural 1989 FIFA Futsal World Championship.

His final international game was a March 1993 friendly match against South Korea.

== Honours ==
Canada

- North American Nations Cup: 1990; 3rd place, 1991
