= Joseph Majcher =

Polish-born Canadian soccer player

Personal information
- Date of birth: 17 March 1960 (age 66)
- Place of birth: Rzeszów, Poland
- Position: Midfielder

Senior career*
Years	Team	Apps	(Gls)
1989–1990	Toronto Blizzard	41	(12)
1990–1992	North York Rockets	54	(7)
1993–1994	Toronto Rockets		

International career
1991–1992	Canada	3	(0)

Managerial career
- 2006: Wisla United
- * Club domestic league appearances and goals

Joseph Majcher (born March 17, 1960) is a Polish-born Canadian former soccer player who played at both professional and international levels as a midfielder.

== Club career ==
Majcher played in the Canadian Soccer League with the Toronto Blizzard and the North York Rockets. In 1993, he played in the Canadian National Soccer League with Toronto Rockets. In 1994, he played with the Toronto Rockets in the American Professional Soccer League.

== International career ==
Majcher, who moved to Canada in 1985, earned three caps for Canada between 1991 and 1992, including one appearance at the 1991 CONCACAF Gold Cup.

== Managerial career ==
Majcher was the head coach for Wisla United in the Ontario Soccer League, where he was named the Head Coach of the Year in 2006 in the OSL Provincial division.
