= Brian Hughes (footballer, born 1937) =

Welsh footballer

Personal information
- Date of birth: 22 November 1937
- Place of birth: Swansea, Wales
- Date of death: 7 October 2018 (aged 80)
- Place of death: Victoria, British Columbia
- Height: 6 ft 0 in (1.83 m)
- Position: Defender

Senior career*
Years	Team	Apps	(Gls)
1956–1967	Swansea City	231	(7)
1967–1968	Atlanta Chiefs	60	(2)
1970–1971	Gloucester City	13	(0)

International career
1959–1961	Wales U23	2	(0)

Managerial career
- 1985–1987: Canada U17
- 1990: Canada U20 (Assistant)
- * Club domestic league appearances and goals

Brian Hughes (22 November 1937 – 7 October 2018) was a Welsh professional footballer. He played U23 for Wales then joined Swansea City of the 2nd Division in July 1956. He made his professional debut in a 1–1 draw against Grimsby Town in 1958. Brian was a key asset to the team that went to the FA Cup semi final in the 1963–64 season. Brian played two years (1967 and 1968) in the fledgling North American Soccer League with the Atlanta Chiefs.

Hughes moved to Victoria, British Columbia, where he was a player coach of the London Boxing Club. He later coached the University of Victoria Vikings soccer team, winning the CIAU championships in 1975 and 1987. The 1975 team won UVic's first ever CIAU Championship. The team knocked off Dalhousie and then Concordia to claim the national title after earlier Canada West victories over Alberta and Saskatchewan.

Hughes also coached in the Canada national team soccer system. He died in Victoria on 7 October 2018.

== Career statistics ==
=== English League ===
7 goals in 231 games

=== North American Soccer League ===
2 goals in 60 games

== Honours ==
Swansea City

- Welsh Cup: 1960–61

Atlanta Chiefs

- North American Soccer League: 1968
