= North York Rockets =

Former soccer team in North York, Ontario

- Nickname: Rockets
- Founded: 1987
- Dissolved: 1993
- Stadium: Esther Shiner Stadium; North York, Toronto, Ontario, Canada
- League: CSL; CNSL

The North York Rockets were a professional soccer team based in North York, Toronto, Ontario that competed in the original Canadian Soccer League. They were one of four teams to participate in every season of the CSL. Upon the demise of the CSL, the Rockets joined the Canadian National Soccer League.

== History ==
=== Canadian Soccer League ===
The North York Rockets were formed by a group consisting of Gus Mandarino, Basil Policaro, Tony Ciamarra, Joe D'Urzo, Mario Rollo, and Mario Giangioppo to play in the inaugural season of the Canadian Soccer League in 1987.

In their debut league match, the Rockets tied the Toronto Blizzard, by a score of 1–1.

The Rockets's best result came in 1991 when they defeated the Nova Scotia Clippers with a 9–1 goal aggregate to advance to the league cup semi-finals. The Rockets struggled in their first season, winning only one match, en route to a 1–7–12 record, finishing last in the league.

The Rockets improved in the following seasons, qualifying for the playoffs in each of the next three seasons, although they were defeated in the first round of the playoffs each year. During the 1991 season, the Rockets finished third in the league, qualifying for the playoffs for the fourth consecutive season. The won their first and only CSL playoff series when they defeated the Nova Scotia Clippers by an aggregate score of 9–1 (5–1 and 4–0 victories), but were defeated in the semi-finals by city rival Toronto Blizzard. During the 1992 season, the Rockets finished in second place in the regular season, six points behind league leaders Vancouver, but were once again defeated in the first round of the playoffs by eventual champions Winnipeg.

=== Canadian National Soccer League ===
Following the folding of the CSL after the 1992 season, the Rockets joined the semi-professional Canadian National Soccer League for the 1993 season, becoming known as the Toronto Rockets. They finished in first place in the Western Conference (and in the overall league table), qualifying for the playoffs where they defeated London City and Montreal Croatia in the first two rounds, but were defeated by St. Catharines Roma in the championship final.

=== American Professional Soccer League ===
After the 1993 season, the Toronto Blizzard, who had joined the US-based American Professional Soccer League in 1993, folded and were replaced by the Rockets, who inherited some of the Blizzard players and played under the name Toronto Rockets. The Rockets finished in last place with a 5–15 record, as well as the worst attendance in the league, drawing in fewer than 1500 fans per match. The club had planned to return for the 1995 season, but withdrew only days before the start of the 1995 season, due to a financial dispute with the league's front office.

== Seasons ==
as North York Rockets

Season	Tier	League	Record	Rank	Playoffs	Ref
1987	1	Canadian Soccer League	1–7–12	4th, East	Did not qualify	
1988	1	Canadian Soccer League	10–8–10	3rd, East	Quarter-Finals	
1989	1	Canadian Soccer League	12–9–5	3rd, East	Quarter-Finals	
1990	1	Canadian Soccer League	7–9–10	5th, East	Quarter-finals	
1991	1	Canadian Soccer League	13–9-6	3rd	Semi-finals	
1992	1	Canadian Soccer League	8–6–6	2nd	Semi-finals	

as Toronto Rockets

Season	Tier	League	Record	Rank	Playoffs	Ref
1993	2	Canadian National Soccer League	9–6–1	1st, West	Finalists	
1994	1 (U.S)	American Professional Soccer League	5–15	7th	Did not qualify	

== Notable players ==
- (Canada) Oscar Albuquerque
- (Canada) Eddy Berdusco
- (Italy) Massimo Briaschi
- (Canada) Ian Bridge
- (Canada) Shel Brodsgaard
- (South Africa) David Byrne
- (Canada) Ian Carter
- (Canada) Paolo Ceccarelli
- (Canada) Sasho Cirovski
- (Canada) Cosimo Commisso
- (Canada) Pat Cubellis
- (Canada) Nick Dasovic
- (Chile) Jorge Espinoza
- (Canada) Charlie Falzon
- (Canada) Don Ferguson
- (Canada) John Fitzgerald
- (Argentina) Amadeo Gasparini
- (Canada) Peter Gilfillan
- (Canada) (Poland) Ralph Golen
- (Poland) Marek Grabowski
- (Canada) Phil Ionadi
- (Canada) Steve Jansen
- (Poland) Zygmunt Kalinowski
- (Iran) (United States) Ali Kazemaini
- (Canada) Jens Kraemer
- (Canada) Franco Lofranco
- (Canada) Joseph Majcher
- (Canada) Hector Marinaro
- (Canada) (Iran) Peyvand Mossavat
- (Poland) Mirosław Piękoś
- (Canada) Tony Pignatiello
- (Canada) Tomasz Radzinski
- (Portugal) Luis Bento
- (Canada) Randy Ragan
- (Canada) Peter Sarantopoulos
- (Canada) Peter Sloly
- (Canada) Pat Sullivan
- (Cyprus) Vladan Tomić
- (Hungary) András Törőcsik
- (Canada) Peter Zezel

== Resource ==
North York Rockets Official Program
