= Roderick Scott =

Canadian former soccer player and coach (born 1965)

Personal information
- Date of birth: 27 December 1965 (age 60)
- Place of birth: London, England
- Height: 5 ft 10 in (1.78 m)
- Position: Striker

Youth career
- 1975–1982: Kitchener Minor Soccer Association
- 1983–1984: Kitchener City
- 1985–1988: Akron Zips

Senior career*
Years	Team	Apps	(Gls)
1989–1993	Dallas Sidekicks (indoor)	128	(43)
1990–1991	Kitchener Kickers	38	(8)
1994	Las Vegas Dustdevils (indoor)	24	(13)

International career
1993	Canada	5	(0)

Managerial career
- 1996: Dallas Sidekicks
- Soccer Studio
- * Club domestic league appearances and goals

Roderick Scott (born 27 December 1965) is a Canadian former soccer player and coach.

== Club career ==
=== University of Akron ===
Scott attended the University of Akron on a soccer scholarship after a recruiter spotted him playing for the Canadian U-19 national team. He played on the Zips soccer team from 1985 to 1988. In 1986 Akron lost in Duke University in the NCAA championship. His senior season, he was a third team All-American. He graduated in 1990 with a bachelor's degree in business and organizational communications. He was inducted into the Akron Sports Hall of Fame in 2008.

=== Professional ===
In 1989, the Dallas Sidekicks of the Major Indoor Soccer League selected Scott in the first round (sixth overall) of the 1989 MISL Draft. The Sidekicks competed in MISL until 1992. That year, Scott was a first team All Star. In 1993, Scott and his teammates moved to the Continental Indoor Soccer League. In 1994, he moved to the expansion Las Vegas Dustdevils. He suffered a career ending knee injury that season even as the Dustdevils won the CISL championship. He also played with the Kitchener in the CSL.

== International career ==
He made his debut for Canada in a March 1993 friendly match against the USA and went on to earn a total of 5 caps, scoring no goals. He was included in Canada's 1993 CONCACAF Gold Cup squad, and his final international was an 8–0 demolition by Mexico at that tournament.

== Coaching career ==
In 1996, he served as an assistant coach with the Sidekicks. In 2001, he became a staff coach with the Dallas Texans Soccer Club. He has also coached Soccer Studio, a team in the Premier Arena Soccer League.
