= Hamilton Steelers (1981–1992) =

Canadian soccer team

- Founded: 1981
- Dissolved: 1992
- Stadium: Brian Timmis Stadium
- Capacity: 5,000
- Owner: Mario DiBartolomeo
- League: CSL; CPSL; NSL

The Hamilton Steelers were a Canadian soccer team in Hamilton, Ontario that competed in the original Canadian Soccer League, the original Canadian Professional Soccer League, National Soccer League and the Challenge Trophy. The club played mainly out of Brian Timmis Stadium, which was adjacent to Ivor Wynne Stadium.

== History ==
=== Pre-history ===
In 1954, the Hamilton Italo-Canadian Soccer Club was founded and in 1958, they joined the National Soccer League. In 1961, the team changed names and became known as the Hamilton Steelers and moved to the Eastern Canada Professional Soccer League. In 1964, the club was renamed the Hamilton Primos Soccer Club and returned to the NSL in 1967 following the NSL-ECPSL amalgamation. The club folded after the 1967 season.

=== Club history ===
==== National Soccer League (NSL) ====
This edition of the Hamilton Steelers was formed in 1981 by Mario DiBartolomeo and joined the National Soccer League. The team was an off-shoot of the Hamilton Italo-Canadians that had competed in the NSL from 1972 to 1979, after which they had taken a leave of absence. When DiBartolemeo's partners decided to not return, he formed the Steelers on his own in 1981, choosing the name to give the club more of a Canadian identity.

They captured the league triple crown in their inaugural season in the NSL winning the regular season, playoff, and league cup titles. In 1982, they finished in second place during the regular season, but advanced to the playoff championship final where they defeated Toronto Italia to win their second consecutive title.

==== Canadian Professional Soccer League (CPSL) ====
In 1983, the Steelers decided to join the new national professional league, Canadian Professional Soccer League. Their first match was on May 22 against the Edmonton Eagles, in which they were defeated by the visiting side 2–1 in front of approximately 4,000 fans at Ivor Wynne Stadium. After several draws and losses, the Steelers won their first game in the CPSL on June 15, when they defeated Inter-Montréal. This league proved to be unsuccessful, unable to complete its first season fully, lasting only 73 days in total. After two teams, folded mid-season, the remaining teams suspended the remainder of the season, and initiated a playoffs to determine a champion. After finishing in second at the time of the regular season suspension, Hamilton defeated Mississauga Croatia in the semi-finals, before falling to the Edmonton Eagles in the championship match.

The Steelers fielded a reserve team in the NSL and some players returned to play for the NSL Steelers after the CPSL folded mid-season.

==== Return to Amateur and Challenge Trophy ====
Following the CPSL folding in 1983, the Steelers returned to the amateur league and won the 1986 Ontario Cup as provincial champions. As a result, they qualified for the national tournament, where they won the 1986 Challenge Trophy after defeating Vancouver Croatia 1–0 in the final. Hamilton also played in the Inter-City Soccer League in 1986 where they won the league double (McGuiness Trophy & Hiram Walker Cup).

==== Canadian Soccer League ====
In 1987, they returned to professional status, joining the new national Canadian Soccer League as one of the original eight teams. In the league's inaugural season, they won the East Division and advanced to the playoff final where they were defeated by Calgary. This began a recurring pattern for Hamilton. During the 1988 and 1989 seasons, they repeated as East Division champions, and advanced to the championship finals, where they were defeated by the Vancouver 86ers both years. In 1990, they failed to win their division for the first time, but they nevertheless advanced to the CSL Championship final for the fourth consecutive year, but for the third year in a row, they were defeated by the 86ers. Following the retirement of league commissioner Dale Barnes in 1991, Steelers owner Mario DiBartolomeo became the interim league president ahead of the 1991 season. In 1991, the Steelers failed to advance to the championship final for the first time, losing in the semi-finals.

Following the 1991 season, the club folded due to financial difficulties, despite offers of cost sharing with the Vancouver and Montreal team owners.

==== Future of Hamilton soccer ====
In 2019, professional soccer returned to the city of Hamilton with the founding of the Canadian Premier League. The Hamilton Steelers name had been trademarked as a potential name for the franchise, which was ultimately named Forge FC. In 2026, Forge FC used a jersey design which paid homage to the Hamilton Steelers.

== Seasons ==
Season	Tier	League	Record	Rank	Playoffs	Ref
1981	2	National Soccer League	16–1–3	1st	Champions	
1982	2	National Soccer League	9–5–4	2nd	Champions	
1983 (Note: The 1983 CPSL regular season was cancelled partway through the season and playoffs began immediately after it)	1	Canadian Professional Soccer League	4–4–4	2nd	Finalists	
1983 (Note: The Steelers operated a reserve team in the NSL during the 1983 season)	2	National Soccer League (Hamilton B team)	5–4–18	8th	Did not qualify	
1984	Operated at the amateur level					
1985	Operated at the amateur level					
1986	Operated at the amateur level					
1987	1	Canadian Soccer League	10–6–4	1st, East	Finalists	
1988	1	Canadian Soccer League	18–6–4	1st, East	Finalists	
1989	1	Canadian Soccer League	15–7–4	2nd, East	Finalists	
1990	1	Canadian Soccer League	10–9–7	3rd, East	Finalists	
1991	1	Canadian Soccer League	14–4–10	4th	Semi-Finals	

== Notable players ==
- (Chile) Marco Abascal
- (Croatia) Željko Adžić
- (Canada) Oscar Albuquerque
- (Canada) Geoff Aunger
- (Canada) Alex Bunbury
- (Canada) Cosimo Commisso
- (Canada) Paul Dolan
- (Canada) Jim Easton Jr.
- (England) Justin Fashanu
- (Canada) Paul Fenwick
- (Canada) Drew Ferguson
- (Canada) Ray Flannigan
- (Canada) Iain Fraser
- (Argentina) Amadeo Gasparini
- (Suriname) Robert Gemert
- (Canada) Peter Gilfillan
- (Canada) Stevie Gill
- (Canada) Kevin Grant
- (Canada) Gerry Gray
- (Canada) James Grimes
- (Canada) Sven Habermann
- (England) Paul Hammond
- (Canada) Graham Hatley
- (Canada) John Hughes
- (Canada) Lucio Ianiero
- (Canada) Paul James
- (Canada) John Kerr Jr.
- (Canada) Tino Lettieri
- (Canada) Dino Lopez
- (Canada) Shaun Lowther
- (Argentina) Pedro Magallanes
- (Canada) Hector Marinaro
- (Canada) Craig Martin
- (Canada) Trevor McCallum
- (Canada) Jim McLoughlin
- (Canada) Ed McNally
- (Serbia) Božidar Milenković
- (Canada) Colin Miller
- (Canada) Steve Morris
- (Canada) Lou Nagy
- (Argentina) Hugo Nicolini
- (Canada) Tony Nocita
- (Republic of Ireland) Fran O'Brien
- (Canada) Tom Panhuyzen
- (Canada) (Italy) Ardo Perri
- (Poland) Mirosław Piękoś
- (Canada) Tony Pignatiello
- (United States) Brian Quinn
- (Canada) Paul Roe
- (Canada) Bryan Rosenfeld
- (Canada) Carlos Salguero
- (United States) Tom Soehn
- (Canada) Mike Stojanović
- (Nigeria) Thompson Usiyan
- (Argentina) Mario Videla
- (Canada) Gordon Wallace
- (Canada) Mark Watson

== See also ==
- Hamilton Steelers (1958–67)
- Forge FC
