= Canada men's national soccer team =

Canada
- Nickname(s): The Canucks, Les Rouges
- Association: Canadian Soccer Association (CSA)
- Confederation: CONCACAF (North America)
- Sub-confederation: NAFU (North America)
- Head coach: Jesse Marsch
- Captain: Alphonso Davies
- Most caps: Atiba Hutchinson (104)
- Top scorer: Jonathan David (45)
- Home stadium: Various
- FIFA code: CAN
First colours	Second colours	Third colours

FIFA ranking
- Current: 25 ▲2 (November 18, 2026)
- Highest: 25 (November 2026)
- Lowest: 122 (August 2014, October 2014)

First international
- Australia 3–2 Canada (Brisbane, Australia; June 7, 1924)

Biggest win
- Cayman Islands 0–11 Canada (Bradenton, United States; March 29, 2021)

Biggest defeat
- Mexico 8–0 Canada (Mexico City, Mexico; July 18, 1993)

World Cup
- Appearances: 3 (first in 1986)
- Best result: Round of 16 (2026)

CONCACAF Championship / Gold Cup
- Appearances: 21 (first in 1977)
- Best result: Champions (1985, 2000)

CONCACAF Nations League
- Appearances: 4 (first in 2019–20)
- Best result: Runners-up (2023)

Copa América
- Appearances: 1 (first in 2024)
- Best result: Fourth place (2024)
Medal record
Olympic Games (Note: Medal recognized by IOC, but not by FIFA.)
Gold medal – first place	1904 St. Louis	Team
CONCACAF Championship / Gold Cup
Gold medal – first place	1985 North America	Team
Gold medal – first place	2000 United States	Team
Bronze medal – third place	2002 United States	Team
CONCACAF Nations League
Silver medal – second place	2023 United States	Team
Bronze medal – third place	2025 United States	Team
North American Nations Cup
Gold medal – first place	1990 Canada	Team
Bronze medal – third place	1991 United States	Team
- Website: Official website

The Canada men's national soccer team (French: Équipe du Canada de soccer masculin) represents Canada in men's international soccer, and is governed by the Canadian Soccer Association (French: Association canadienne de soccer), the governing body for soccer in Canada founded in 1912. It has been a full member of FIFA since 1912, is a founding member of CONCACAF which was founded in 1961, and is also a member of NAFU in the North American Zone.

Canada has qualified for the FIFA World Cup three times (1986, 2022, and 2026). It is one of five CONCACAF teams to have advanced to the knockout stage, reaching the round of 16 as co-hosts in 2026. The team qualified for the FIFA Confederations Cup once (2001).

Canada has participated twenty times in CONCACAF's premier continental competition, winning the CONCACAF Championship in 1985 and the CONCACAF Gold Cup in 2000. It also finished as runners-up in the CONCACAF Nations League in the 2023 finals. The team participated once in the Copa América, finishing as fourth place in 2024. In subcontinental competitions, the team won the North American Nations Cup as hosts in 1990.

== History ==
=== Early years ===
Football was being played in Canada with the Dominion Football Association (1877) and Western Football Association (1880) acting as precursors to the modern-day Canadian Soccer Association. In 1885, the WFA sent a team to New Jersey to take on a side put forth by the American Football Association, the then-unofficial governing body of the sport in the United States. On November 28, 1885, in an unofficial friendly, Canada defeated the United States 1–0 at Clark Field in the East Newark neighbourhood of Kearny, New Jersey. The American team won 3–2 in a return match one year later. In 1888, a team represented the WFA in a tour of the British Isles, earning a record of nine wins, five draws, and nine losses. The squad comprised 16 Canadian-born players with the only exception being tour organizer David Forsyth, who had immigrated to Canada one year after his birth.

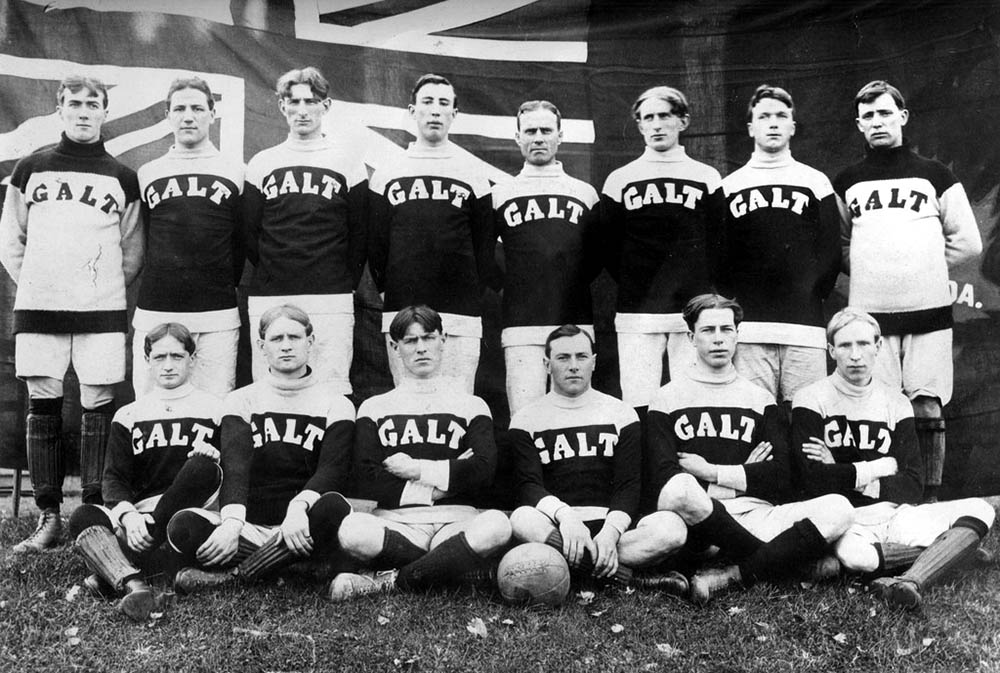
The Galt F.C. team that represented Canada and won gold at the 1904 Summer Olympics

In 1904 Galt F.C. represented the WFA at the Olympic Games in St. Louis, Missouri. As just one of three teams competing, Galt defeated two American clubs, Christian Brothers College (7–0) and St. Rose (4–0) to win the tournament. The Toronto Mail and Empire of November 18, 1904, reports that "Immediately after the game, the Galt aggregation, numbering about 50 persons, retired to the office of James W. Sullivan, chief of the Department of Physical Culture, where they received their prize. After a short talk by Mr. James E. Conlon of the Physical Culture Department, Mayor Mundy, of the City of Galt, presented each player on the winning team with a beautiful gold medal." The medals are clearly engraved with the name of the company in St. Louis that made them.

In 1905, a British team of touring amateurs nicknamed the "Pilgrims" toured Canada, with their match against Galt billed as the "championship of the world". The match was played in front of 3500 fans in Galt, now part of Cambridge, Ontario, and ended in a 3–3 draw. Earlier the Pilgrims had been beaten 2–1 by Berlin Rangers, in the city now known as Kitchener.

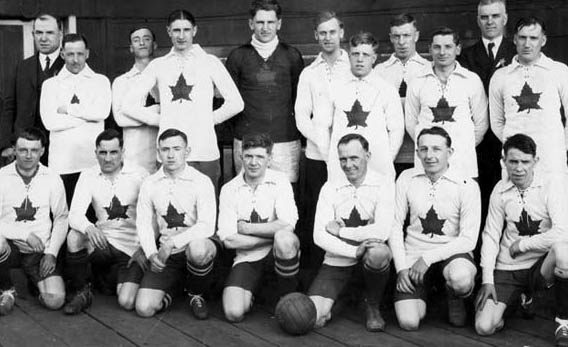
The team that toured Australia in 1924

The Canadian national team toured Australia in 1924, playing a series of "test" friendlies against their hosts, including their first official match, a 3–2 friendly defeat to the Australian national team in Brisbane, Queensland on June 7, 1924. Canada also played Australia at the Jubilee Oval, Adelaide on Saturday July 12, 1924, and defeated them by 4 goals to 1. In 1925, Canada played their old rivals, the United States, in Montreal, winning 1–0 on Ed McLaine's goal. In a return match in November 1925 in Brooklyn, New York, Canada was defeated 1–6. One year later, Canada lost 2–6 to the Americans in the same city before playing four internationals in a 1927 tour of New Zealand.

The New Zealand tour included a total of 22 games, of which Canada won 19 with only 2 defeats. Most of the games were against local combined teams although Canada also played New Zealand in four occasions (scores: 2–2, 2–1, 0–1, 4–1).

=== 1928 to 1987 ===
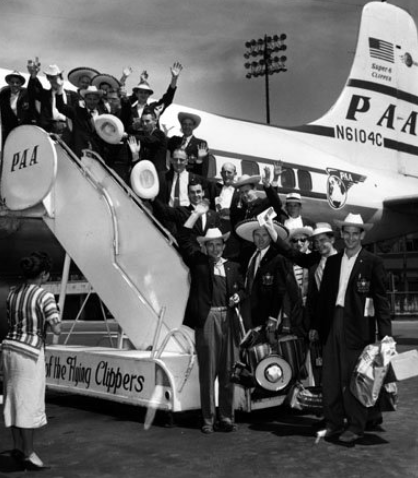
Canadian football team in Mexico City on July 5, 1957

Following the lead of British football associations, Canada withdrew from FIFA in 1928 over a dispute regarding broken time payments to amateur players. They rejoined the confederation in 1946 and took part in World Cup qualifying in the North American Football Confederation (NAFC) (a precursor to CONCACAF) for the first time in 1957, the first time they had played as a national team in 30 years. Under the guidance of head coach Don Petrie, Canada defeated the United States in Toronto 5–1 in their opening game, but lost two games in Mexico (failing to play a home game due to financial reasons) 0–2 and 0–3 before defeating the U.S. 3–2 in St. Louis. Mexico advanced as group winners, meaning that Canada missed out on the World Cup in Sweden.

Canada withdrew from World Cup qualifying for 1962 due to scheduling constraints and did not enter a team for 1966. They did compete in football however at the 1967 Pan American Games, their first time to do so in the sixth edition of the games, which they hosted in Winnipeg. Canada finished fourth place, helped somewhat by defending champion Brazil's absence.

A 0–0 draw away to Bermuda meant the Canadians, under coach Peter Dinsdale, could not advance out of the first round of qualifying for the 1970 World Cup. Dinsdale was replaced by Frank Pike. In their second participation in soccer at the Pan Am games, held in Cali, Canada finished second in their opening round group (to hosts Colombia). In the final group round however, they managed only one win (over Colombia) and finished next to last.

Canada again failed at the first hurdle in qualifying for the 1974 FIFA World Cup. Under German head coach Eckhard Krautzun, they finished second in a home and away qualifying group for the 1973 CONCACAF Championship (to Mexico). For the 1975 Pan Am Games, Canada, along with most of the larger Pan Am countries, sent their Olympic team, which was amateur (and senior aged), to compete. After narrowly qualifying out of the first round, the Canucks were soundly defeated by Costa Rica, Cuba, and Mexico, conceding a total of 14 goals while scoring none. At the Summer Olympics at home the following year, under head coach Colin Morris, the amateur Canadian side failed to get out of the first round, losing both of their games. This despite the brilliant play of Jimmy Douglas, who scored a goal against a Dynamo Kyiv-dominated Soviet Union side and another goal against North Korea, Canada's only two goals in the tournament.

In their North American qualifying group for the 1977 CONCACAF Championship, with both group winners and runners-up now advancing, Canada, again under head coach Krautzun, qualified as runners-up after defeating the Americans 3–0 in a neutral site one-match play-off, played in Port-au-Prince, Haiti. In the championship, played in Monterrey and Mexico City, Mexico won all five of their matches with a +15 goal difference to win the tournament handily. Canada finished fourth.

Matters were different however at the next CONCACAF championship, in 1981, played in Tegucigalpa, Honduras. Canada entered the tournament raising eyebrows by winning their qualifying group over Mexico and the United States, even achieving a 1–1 draw against Mexico at the Azteca Stadium with Gerry Gray scoring from a direct free kick in the 88th-minute. In the final round, the Canadians opened strongly with a 1–0 win over El Salvador, with Mike Stojanovic the goal-scorer, and a 1–1 draw with Haiti, with Stojanovic scoring again. They next lost to the hosts Honduras 1–2 and then drew Mexico 1–1 with Ian Bridge scoring the equalizer via a corner kick. A win in their final game against Cuba would have put them through to Spain, but they were held to a 2–2 draw, allowing El Salvador to qualify as tournament runners-up.

Between 1981 and 1985, Canada continued to develop under the guidance of English coach Tony Waiters. After a strong performance at the 1984 Summer Olympics, Waiters would see the Maple Leafs through to their first World Cup finals appearance in 1985. A 1–1 away draw to Guatemala was key in allowing them to eliminate Los Chapines in the first round group. The second round was also closely contested, in part as this Canadian squad was strong defensively but had limited ability to score goals. The Canucks managed to eke out a 1–0 away win over Honduras, thanks to a George Pakos winner, hold Costa Rica scoreless in San José, and then in their final game, one they needed to draw to qualify, beat Los Catrachos a second time, 2–1 in St. John's, Newfoundland, with Pakos and Igor Vrablic the goal scorers. The victory not only secured their first World Cup finals berth, but also the crown of CONCACAF champions for the first time, although Mexico did not compete, having already qualified automatically for the World Cup as hosts.

At the 1986 FIFA World Cup, Canada impressed defensively in their first game against France, only conceding a late Jean-Pierre Papin goal after Papin had missed several earlier chances. However, Canada could not build on their stubborn performance against France, losing their next two matches to both Hungary and the Soviet Union 0–2, finishing the group stage in last place with zero points.

Four Canadian players (Chris Chueden, Hector Marinaro, David Norman and Vrablic) were involved in a match fixing betting scandal at the Merlion Cup tournament in Singapore two months after the World Cup. The four players were suspended by the Canadian Soccer Association for "bringing the game into disrepute". Norman was reinstated in 1992 after admitting his involvement in the scandal. Vrablic never played for Canada again.

=== 1990s ===
Qualification for the 1990 World Cup lasted all of two matches for Canada, a home-and-away series with Guatemala, played in October 1988. The Central Americans won the first game 1–0 in Guatemala City while Canada prevailed in Vancouver 3–2. Tied on goal difference, Los Chapines advanced on the away goals rule.

1990 saw Canada take part in the first North American Nations Cup, hosting the three-team tournament. Mexico and Canada sent their full squads, but the United States sent a 'B' team. Canada won the tournament after a 1–0 win over the United States on May 6 and a 2–1 win over Mexico on May 13. All three Canadian goals were scored by John Catliff, the tournament's top scorer.

Canada came close to qualifying for the World Cup again in 1994 under the guidance of a defender on the 1986 team, Bob Lenarduzzi. They entered the tournament at the second round stage and advanced as group runners-up. Canada competed strongly in the final qualifying round, drawing their first match in Tegucigalpa after a controversial penalty allowed the Hondurans to draw even, winning their next two, over El Salvador and Honduras in Vancouver, losing convincingly at Azteca Stadium, and winning 2–1 in San Salvador. They went into their final group match against Mexico, in Toronto, needing a win to win the group and thus qualify directly for the World Cup. Canada went up 1–0 on a goal credited to Alex Bunbury off a free kick, but Mexico scored twice to win, 2–1. The loss meant Canada finished second and advanced to an intercontinental play-off series where they needed to win two rounds to qualify for the 1994 FIFA World Cup. The Reds went up against Oceania Football Confederation's champions Australia. Canada won the first leg 2–1 in Edmonton. Australia led the second leg 2–1 at the end of 90 minutes, sending the tie to extra time. There was no score in the extra 30 minutes, meaning the series was decided by a penalty shootout which Australia won 4–1 to eliminate Canada from contention. Australia went on to lose 2–1 on aggregate to Argentina, who advanced to the World Cup.

With the World Cup to be played in the United States, Canada had the opportunity to play a number of high-profile squads in tune-up matches. They played against Morocco, Brazil, Germany, Spain, and the Netherlands all within 13 days. Canada held eventual World Cup champions Brazil to a 1–1 draw at Commonwealth Stadium, on a 69th-minute equalizer by Eddy Berdusco, on Canada's only real scoring chance in the game.

With three countries set to qualify out of CONCACAF for the 1998 World Cup, and with Canada handily winning their second round group over El Salvador, Panama, and Cuba, expectations were high for a second qualification in 12 years in the spring of 1997. The aging Canadians, however, fared miserably, losing their opening game to Mexico 0–4 and the following match to the U.S. 0–3. In their next two matches, against El Salvador and Jamaica, they could only manage two 0–0 draws in Vancouver. A 1–0 win over Costa Rica in Edmonton in their next match thanks to a goal by Berdusco gave Canada some hope at the halfway point but losses to both Jamaica and El Salvador away ended any aspirations as they finished bottom of the group with 6 points from 10 games and a −15 goal difference. Having overseen two consecutive World Cup campaigns ending in the side failing to qualify, Lenarduzzi stepped down in 1997 and was replaced by interim head coach Bruce Twamley.

=== 2000s ===
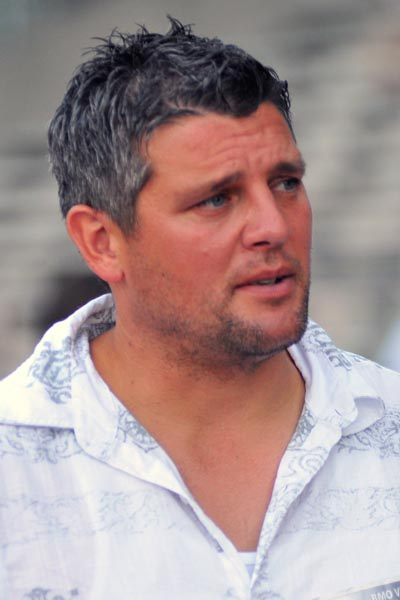
Carlo Corazzin, who won the Golden Boot award during the 2000 CONCACAF Gold Cup

The Canadian Soccer Association turned to another German to lead the senior national team in 1998 with the signing of Holger Osieck. Success came quickly with Canada winning the CONCACAF Gold Cup in February 2000. After emerging from the first round on a coin-toss tiebreaker with invited side Republic of Korea, the Canucks scored a quarter-final upset win over Mexico. The win set the stage for an unprecedented run to the final, where Canada defeated Colombia 2–0 at Los Angeles Memorial Coliseum. Canada swept the awards ceremony, with goalkeeper Craig Forrest winning MVP honours, Carlo Corazzin securing the Golden Boot, and Richard Hastings named Rookie of the Tournament.

Expectations were again high following the winter's result, but the campaign sputtered. A positive 1–0 away result in Havana in June was followed by a listless 0–0 home draw against Cuba. For the semi-final round two out of four teams advanced. Canada was eliminated from World Cup contention after finishing third in the semi-final round. Canada managed just one goal in 6 games while conceding 8 to finish third in the standings, well adrift of advancing sides Trinidad and Tobago and Mexico.

Winning the Gold Cup earned Canada a place in the 2001 Confederations Cup, where the highlight was holding Brazil to a 0–0 draw. The Gold Cup victory also won them an invitation to compete in the 2001 Copa América. When security concerns prompted the cancellation of the tournament, Canada disbanded their training camp. The tournament was then reinstated and held on schedule. The Canadian Soccer Association announced they would not be able to participate in the reinstated tournament.

Canada had another strong showing in the 2002 CONCACAF Gold Cup, losing to the United States in the semi-finals in penalties, and then defeating South Korea in the third-place game, 2–1. The Gold Cup was held the following year, and Canada was eliminated in the first round on goal difference, leading to head coach Osieck resigning in September 2003 and former player Colin Miller put in charge as an interim.

2004 marked the beginning of 2006 World Cup qualification and a new era under the guidance of former Canadian skipper Frank Yallop. Things began brightly, with the Canadians dispatching of Belize handily in the preliminary round, 8–0 on aggregate, in a home-and-home series. Matters turned, however, with Canada finishing bottom in a group featuring Costa Rica, Guatemala, and Honduras. They got only 5 points from 6 matches and a −4 goal difference. Hard times continued under Yallop as the Canucks again went out at the first barrier in the Gold Cup, losing to both the U.S. and Costa Rica, while defeating Cuba. The coach stayed on through 2005 into the following summer, overseeing a series a friendlies against European sides. He resigned on June 7, 2006, finishing with a win-loss record of 8–9–3.

Things turned around under interim coach Stephen Hart's guidance. Canada opened their 2007 CONCACAF Gold Cup campaign with a 2–1 win over Costa Rica. A 1–2 upset loss to upstarts Guadeloupe was followed by a 2–0 victory over Haiti, securing Canada first-place in their group. They next beat Guatemala 3–0 in their quarter-final match setting up a semi-final showdown with the host Americans. Substitute Iain Hume scored for Canada in the 76th minute to cut the United States' lead to 2–1. After the United States were reduced to ten men, Canada pressed for the equalizer but were denied when Atiba Hutchinson's stoppage-time goal was incorrectly flagged offside by linesman Ricardo Louisville and Canada was eliminated.

The team faced criticism for its poor handling of goalkeeper Greg Sutton, who suffered a concussion during a practice prior to the start of the Gold Cup. Without a doctor accompanying the team, Sutton instead saw a local physician who cleared him to practice, resulting in Sutton suffering post-concussion syndrome. Sutton was lost to his professional club Toronto FC for nearly a year.

Prior to the Gold Cup on May 18, 2007, the Canadian Soccer Association announced that former national team player Dale Mitchell would take over as head coach of the senior team after the 2007 FIFA U-20 World Cup. Mitchell had previously served as an assistant coach under Coach Frank Yallop. Under Mitchell, Canada drew friendlies with Iceland and against Costa Rica, lost 0–2 to South Africa, had a 1–0 win over Martinique, and a 0–2 defeat to Estonia. Optimism grew, however, as Canada played well in a 2–3 loss to Brazil.

Despite defeating Saint Vincent and the Grenadines 7–1 on aggregate in a second-round series—they had had a bye in the first—Canada did not play at the level they had at the Gold Cup and were eliminated from qualifying for the 2010 World Cup. They conceded an equalizer shortly after scoring the opening goal in a 1–1 draw to Jamaica at BMO Field, conceded two second-half goals in quick succession in a 1–2 home loss to Honduras at Saputo Stadium, and then lost away to Mexico and Honduras. They finished last in the four-team group with just 2 points from 6 matches. On March 27, 2009, head coach Dale Mitchell was fired. The president of the Canadian Soccer Association, Dominic Maestracci, said that "the Canadian Soccer Association is committed to the future of our men's national team program. We have made this decision to move the program in a new direction." Technical director Stephen Hart was renamed as interim head coach. On December 9, 2009, Hart was named as head coach.

=== 2010s ===
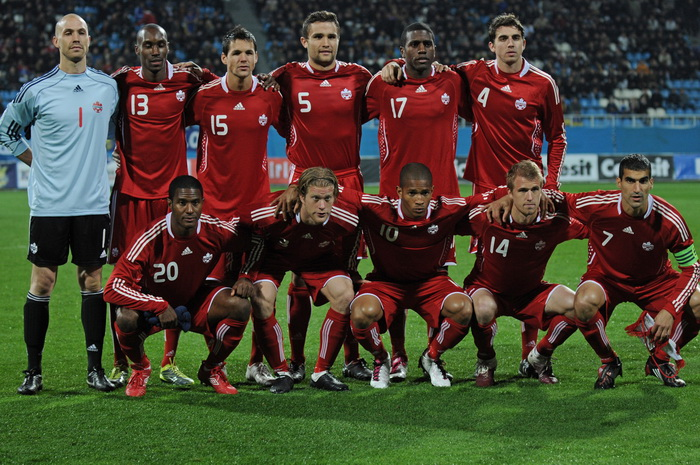
The national soccer team of Canada in 2010

Stephen Hart's first competitive action as the full-time head coach was a poor showing at the 2011 CONCACAF Gold Cup, not managing to get out of the group stage. However, during the early stages qualifying for the 2014 World Cup, Canada topped their group in the second round but were eliminated in the third round of CONCACAF qualifying, finishing one point behind Honduras and Panama after losing 8–1 in Honduras on the final match day.

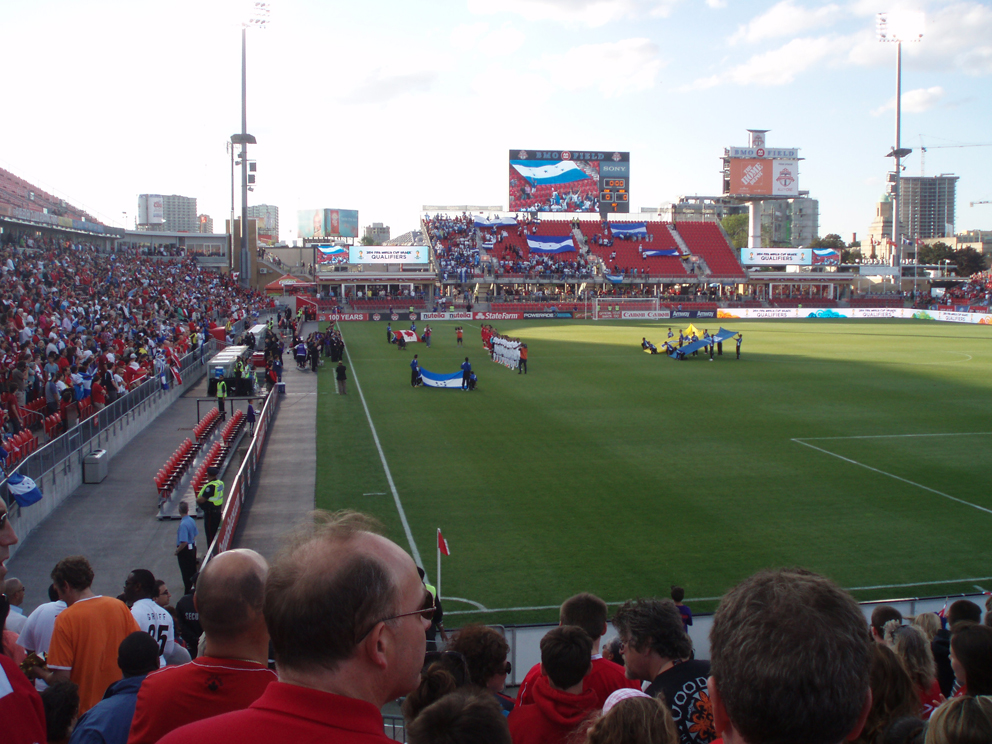
Canada during the national anthem prior to the qualifying match against Honduras on June 12, 2012, at BMO Field

After a series of interim coaching changes following Stephen Hart's dismissal on October 12, 2012 Benito Floro replaced Colin Miller as Canada's coach on August 1, 2013. Being a coach with top-flight management experience in La Liga, he was expected to help Canada raise its competitiveness prior to 2018 World Cup qualifying. In the midst of Floro's player identification and restructuring phase, the team experienced many difficulties including a 958-minute goal-scoring drought, which was finally broken by Atiba Hutchinson in a 1–1 draw with Bulgaria on May 23, 2014. Despite showing improvement with two draws in Europe, Canada continued to shed FIFA points having gone winless for nearly two years, and sank to their lowest ever FIFA ranking of 122 in August 2014. Canada ended a 16-match winless streak on September 10, 2014, defeating Jamaica 3–1 in Toronto.

Canada was drawn into the 2018 FIFA World Cup second round of qualifying against Dominica in June 2015. Canada entered the second round of 2018 World Cup qualifying against Dominica with a game at Windsor Park in Dominica which they won 2–0 with goals from Cyle Larin and a penalty converted by Russell Teibert. In the return leg at BMO Field in front of 9,749 fans they defeated Dominica 4–0 with two goals from Tosaint Ricketts and one each from Tesho Akindele and Cyle Larin.

The team did not score a single goal and finished last in their group in the 2015 CONCACAF Gold Cup after two 0–0 draws to El Salvador and Costa Rica, while also suffering a 1–0 loss against Jamaica. Canada then advanced to the third round of 2018 World Cup qualifying against Belize, winning 4–1 on aggregate and advancing to the fourth round of 2018 World Cup qualifying. Canada was drawn into a group against Honduras, El Salvador and Mexico. They played their first pair of matches in the fourth round on November 13 and 17, 2015. The first match was played in Vancouver at BC Place against Honduras, resulting in a 1–0 win for Canada thanks to a deflected goal by Cyle Larin. The crowd of 20,108 set a new record for the Canadian men's team in the province of British Columbia. In their next game on November 17, away at El Salvador, Canada drew with El Salvador 0-0 as Julian De Guzman broke Canada's record for most caps for the national team with his 85th cap, passing Paul Stalteri's record of 84 caps. With this result in Canada's last game of 2015, they ended off the year conceding just three goals in their final 12 games and in 14 games overall, they ended off with a record of 6 wins, 6 draws, and 2 losses.

On March 25, 2016, in a World Cup qualifier against Mexico at BC Place, 54,798 people were recorded in the stadium which set a new attendance record for a Canadian national team of any sport. Ultimately, however, Canada lost the game 3–0, but remained in second place in the group, keeping them in contention for World Cup qualification. On September 6, 2016, after failing to qualify for the fifth round of 2018 World Cup qualifying despite a 3–1 win over El Salvador, head coach Benito Floro was sacked on September 14, ending his reign as coach of the national team.

Canada recorded a historic 2–0 win against the United States at BMO Field on October 15, 2019.

Canada announced Octavio Zambrano as the new coach of the national team on May 16, 2017, replacing Michael Findlay who was the interim coach after Floro's departure. He guided Canada to a quarterfinal finish at the 2017 CONCACAF Gold Cup, with the team getting out of the group stage for the first time since 2009. However, on January 8, 2018, Zambrano was let go and was replaced with John Herdman, who previously was the head coach of the Canadian women's national team.

Under Herdman, Canada qualified for the top division in the inaugural season of the CONCACAF Nations League following an undefeated qualifying campaign. Competing in CONCACAF Nations League A, Canada earned a 2–0 victory over the United States at BMO Field, Canada's first win against their American rivals since 1985. However, Canada would fall to a 4–1 defeat against the United States in the away leg and failed to qualify for the Nations League Finals.

=== 2020s ===
Canada's national team was marked by the arrival of a golden generation of new young players, led by the first Canadian UEFA Champions League winner Alphonso Davies of Bayern Munich, the most expensive Canadian soccer player in history, Jonathan David who joined Lille for a €30-million fee in 2020 and the establishment of the Canadian Premier League, the first fully professional soccer league in the country. In the first round of World Cup qualifying, Canada finished with a 4–0–0 record to win Group B and progress to the second round. The second round was two leg home-and-away tie against Haiti which Canada won 4–0 on aggregate with a 1–0 win in the away leg and a 3–0 win in the home leg, the latter being played at SeatGeek Stadium in Chicago due to COVID-19 restrictions in Canada. The victory over Haiti led to Canada qualifying for the third and final round of World Cup qualifying for the first time since 1997.

==== 2022 FIFA World Cup ====
Canada began the third round of World Cup qualifying unbeaten in its first eleven matches, finishing 2021 with its first win over Mexico in over 20 years to finish the year at the top of the table. It also ended the year 40th in the FIFA World Rankings, its highest-ever position to date, earning the team the honour of "Most Improved Side" after having started the year ranked 72nd.

On March 27, 2022, Canada defeated Jamaica 4–0 on Matchday 13 to qualify for the 2022 FIFA World Cup in Qatar. This ended a 36-year drought since the first and only time Canada played in the FIFA World Cup, in 1986. The speed of the team's ascent was such that it was subsequently revealed that neither the federation nor kit supplier Nike had anticipated them qualifying, and as a result they would be the only team in Qatar to not receive a special kit for the occasion. Defender Sam Adekugbe remarked "I think that just shows that no one really believed in us. I don't think Canada believed."

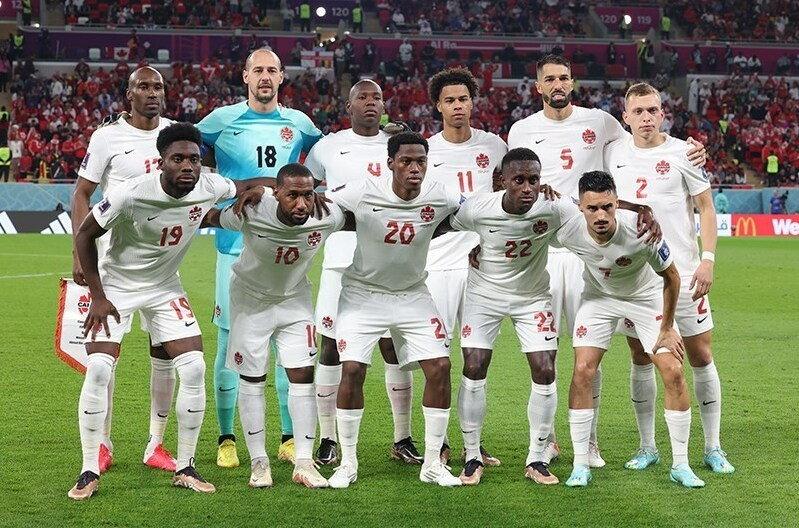
Canada at the 2022 World Cup

In Canada's first match of the tournament against Belgium on November 23, Davies failed to score an early penalty in an eventual 1–0 loss, despite Canada dictating most of the play, and failing to convert any of their 22 shots. Four days later, Davies scored Canada's first ever goal at the World Cup, in a game against Croatia. Croatia came back to win 4–1, eliminating Canada from the tournament after two matches. Canada were defeated 2–1 by Morocco in their final group match on December 1, finishing in last place in their group with zero points. Post-event assessments of Canada's performance were mixed, with many saying that opportunities had been missed, while also creating possibilities for the future 2026 FIFA World Cup that Canada would co-host.

==== Road to 2026 World Cup ====
Canada automatically qualified for the 2026 World Cup as co-host in February 2023. They also qualified to the 2023 CONCACAF Nations League Finals by winning Group C. A 2–0 victory over Panama on June 15, 2023, saw the national team reach its first final in 23 years, where they lost to the United States 2–0. Following this, many of the team's established players opted not to attend the 2023 CONCACAF Gold Cup held later that same summer. After some difficulties in the group stage, Canada reached the quarter-final of the tournament, losing to the United States in a penalty shootout. The summer championships marked the end of Herdman's tenure with Canada Soccer, with his departure coming at the end of August to manage Toronto FC of Major League Soccer, amidst media discussion of conflicts with the federation over funding and playing opportunities.

Interim coach Mauro Biello was tasked with guiding the team through the quarter-finals of the 2023–24 CONCACAF Nations League A in November 2023, where victory in a two-legged aggregate match or away goals rule against Jamaica would both send them to the following spring's semi-finals and qualify them to participate in CONMEBOL's 2024 Copa América. After defeating Jamaica 2–1 in the away leg, Canada needed only a draw in the home match at BMO Field to advance. Leading halfway through, the team collapsed to lose 3–2 in the second half and 3–2 on away goals, as a result missing both the Nations League semi-final and immediate qualification to the Copa América. The loss to Jamaica prompted considerable criticism of the team, Biello, and the federation, with The Athletic opining that Canada's "humiliating loss" should be considered its worst defeat since falling 8–1 to Honduras in World Cup qualification in 2012. As a result, the qualifying play-off for a final place in the Copa América was scheduled on March 23, 2024, against Trinidad and Tobago, which they later won 2–0.

In May 2024, Canada Soccer hired Jesse Marsch to serve as Herdman's permanent replacement as coach. Due to ongoing financial difficulties, the money to pay Marsch was found via donations from MLS clubs CF Montreal, Toronto FC, and Vancouver Whitecaps FC and other private parties. This drew media attention due to the unusual arrangement of the naming rights to the coaching position being given as part of the arrangement, called the "MLS Canada Men's National Team Head Coach". In advance of the Copa América, Marsch's first matches with the team were two friendlies against high-profile opponents, first a lopsided 4–0 loss to the Netherlands, and then a goalless draw with second-ranked France that was generally considered a major success. Canada began Group A play at the Copa against world No. 1-ranked Argentina, a 2–0 loss that nevertheless was generally considered a credible showing. They defeated Peru 1–0, with David scoring the team's first goal of the Marsch era to earn the country's first victory over a CONMEBOL team since the 2000 Gold Cup final. A draw with Chile saw Canada finish second in the group and advance to the knockout stage, where they defeated Venezuela 4–3 on penalties after a 1–1 draw in regulation time to reach a semi-final rematch with Argentina. After another 2–0 loss to the Argentines, Canada played Uruguay in the third-place match. They led 2–1 for the final ten minutes of regulation, but allowed a tying goal in stoppage time, and lost 4–3 on penalties to finish fourth.

On September 7, 2024, Canada defeated the United States 2–1 in a friendly match in Kansas City, Kansas, marking their first victory against the Americans on American soil since 1957. Following two victories over Suriname in the November 2024 CONCACAF Nations League quarter-finals, the team rose to 31st in the FIFA rankings, a new high. Entering the 2024–25 Nations League Finals with the hopes of claiming the team's first trophy in a generation, Canada instead lost 2–0 to Mexico in the semi-final match. They rallied to defeat the United States 2–1 in the third-place match. This was the first time since 1985 that Canada had defeated the United States in consecutive meetings.

On June 7, 2025, Canada defeated Ukraine in a match at BMO Field, the team's first victory against a UEFA side since March 2011. Later in the month, the team competed at the 2025 CONCACAF Gold Cup, its second chance that year to win a trophy. After defeating Honduras 6–0 in their tournament opener, they drew Curaçao and beat El Salvador 2–0, finishing first in their group. Heavy favourites in the quarter-final against Guatemala, they held a 1–0 lead before Jacob Shaffelburg was sent off with a second yellow card. The Guatemalans subsequently tied the game, before prevailing 6–5 on penalties. Canada's performance in the tournament was widely criticized.

==== 2026 FIFA World Cup ====
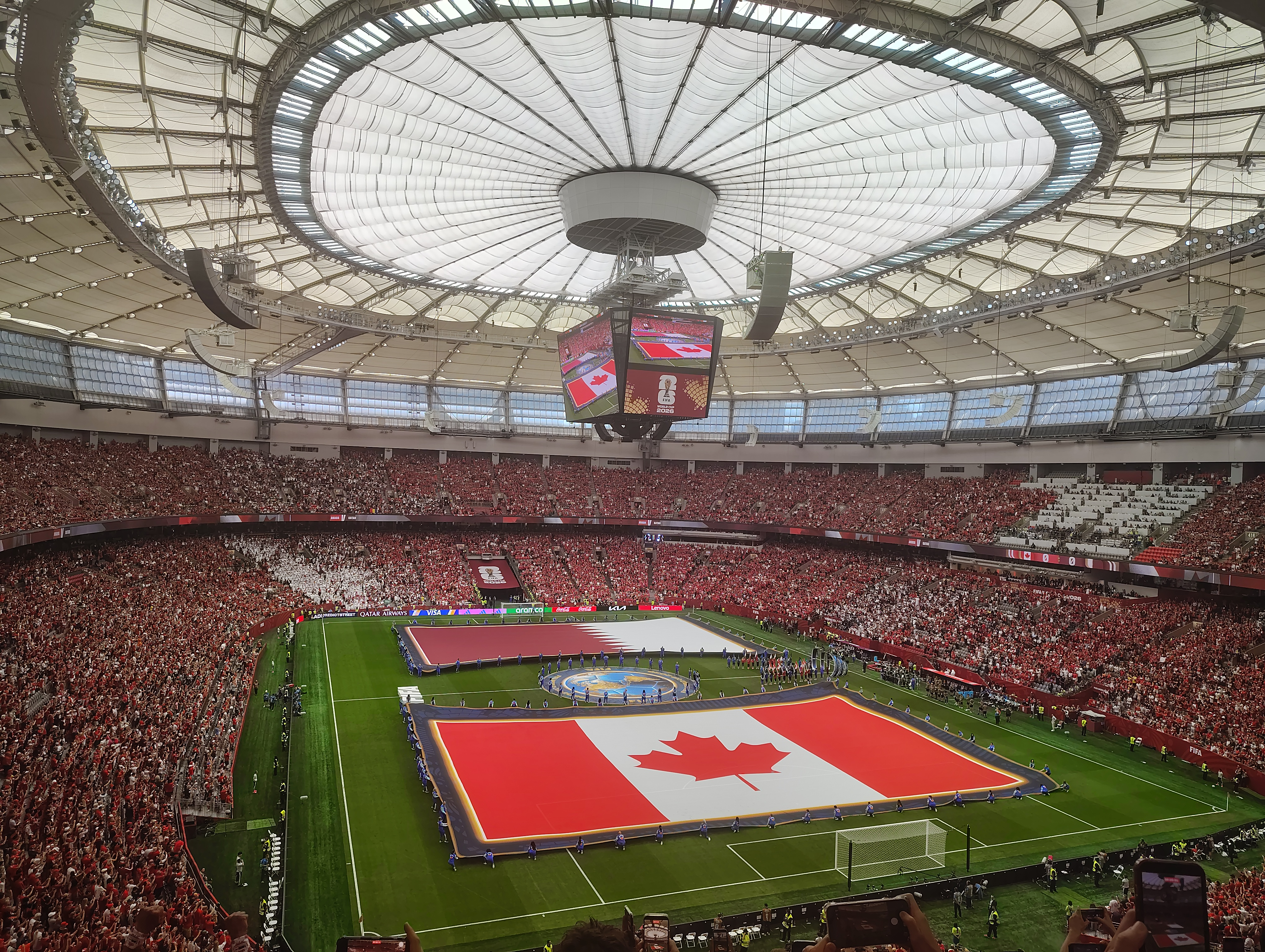
BC Place in Vancouver before Canada's Group B match vs Qatar at the 2026 FIFA World Cup.

Canada's preparations for its home World Cup were dogged by injuries to several key players, most notably Alphonso Davies, who was announced to be unavailable for the team's opening match. Scoring potential was also questioned, having only tallied seven goals in its final eight pre-tournament contests, and with star striker Jonathan David having had a poor club season.

BMO Field hosted Canada's opening match of the World Cup on June 12, 2026, facing Bosnia and Herzegovina. Despite conceding the first ever World Cup goal scored in the country in the first half, substitute Cyle Larin equalized for Canada in the second half, and they secured their first World Cup point via a 1–1 draw. Appearing in their second group stage match at Vancouver's BC Place on June 18, Canada beat Qatar 6–0 to earn their first win in the World Cup. Their six-goal margin of victory was the widest for a CONCACAF team in World Cup history, with David scoring the first World Cup hat trick for a host nation since 1966. Midfielder Ismaël Koné suffered a fractured left leg as a result of a tackle by Qatar's Assim Madibo, which the team vowed to use as motivation in the remainder of the tournament. After a 2–1 loss to Switzerland, Canada finished second in Group B, qualifying to the round of 32. In the country's first-ever appearance in a World Cup knockout match, Stephen Eustáquio scored the lone goal in second half stoppage time to give Canada a 1–0 victory over South Africa at Inglewood, California's SoFi Stadium. It also created a new World Cup record of being the first host nation to play and win a World Cup match outside its own country. In Houston's NRG Stadium, Canada faced Morocco in the round of 16 and were defeated 3-0 despite taking the 2022 semifinalists to the halftime break scoreless.

== Rivalries ==
=== United States ===
Canada has a rivalry with the United States, stemming from a generally friendly rivalry between the two countries. Although Canadians view the United States as its primarily rival, Canada was not seen as a competitive rival by the Americans until recently, viewing Canada seen as only a lesser tertiary regional rival behind Mexico and Costa Rica. Canada had not beaten the United States in a 34-year stretch until 2019, where the rapid growth of Canadian soccer led to matches between the two nations became far more competitive; with Canada now being regarded as the American's secondary rival from the 2020s.

From 1985, Canada has not been beaten the United States in a 34-year stretch until October 15, 2019, where Canada defeated the United States 2–0 at BMO Field during the first leg of the 2019–20 CONCACAF Nations League. One month later on November 15 in the second leg, the United States responded and beat Canada 4–1 in Orlando, Florida; eliminating them from the inaugural Nations League finals. They would not meet in a major match until two years later, where the U.S. again defeated Canada 1–0 in the 2021 CONCACAF Gold Cup group stage. In 2022 World Cup qualifying, Canada earned a 1–1 draw in Nashville, Tennessee and defeated the United States 2–0 in Hamilton, Ontario, leading to them finishing first in CONCACAF qualifying for the first time.

On June 18, 2023, the United States defeated Canada 2–0 in the 2022–23 CONCACAF Nations League final in Las Vegas, Nevada, marking the first time the two nations faced each other in the final of a major CONCACAF tournament, where Gio Reyna was injured from aggressive play from the Canadians. Three weeks later, the U.S. eliminated Canada 3–2 on penalties in the 2023 CONCACAF Gold Cup quarter-final. In an international friendly on September 7, 2024, Canada defeated the United States 2–1 in Kansas City, marking their first win over the United States on U.S. soil in 67 years.

On March 23, 2025, Canada defeated the United States 2–1 in the 2024–25 CONCACAF Nations League third-place match, marking their second consecutive win over the United States and their first back-to-back victories against them since 1985. The match was played amid heightened political tensions between Canada and the United States; the previous month, Canada head coach Jesse Marsch had criticized U.S. President Donald Trump's comments about Canada becoming the "51st state" during the tournament's media day. In stoppage time, a scuffle involving players from both teams broke out after Gio Reyna brought down Jacob Shaffelburg near the touchline. The following year, Marsch continued to criticize the Americans before their October 6, 2026 friendly at Allianz Field, in particular American exceptionalism with the Balogun red card controversy, which the U.S. ultimately would defeat Canada 1–0 in an overly physical match, with Stephen Eustáquio, Auston Trusty, and Justin Ellis suffering injuries.

=== Results ===
With 42 matches played, the United States currently leads the series with 19 wins, 12 draws, and 11 losses, outscoring the Canadians 66–47.

==== Major CONCACAF Finals ====
To date, the United States and Canada have met in one major CONCACAF final. They have not yet met in a CONCACAF Gold Cup final.

Tournament	Winner	Final score	Loser
2023	United States	2–0	Canada

== Stadiums ==
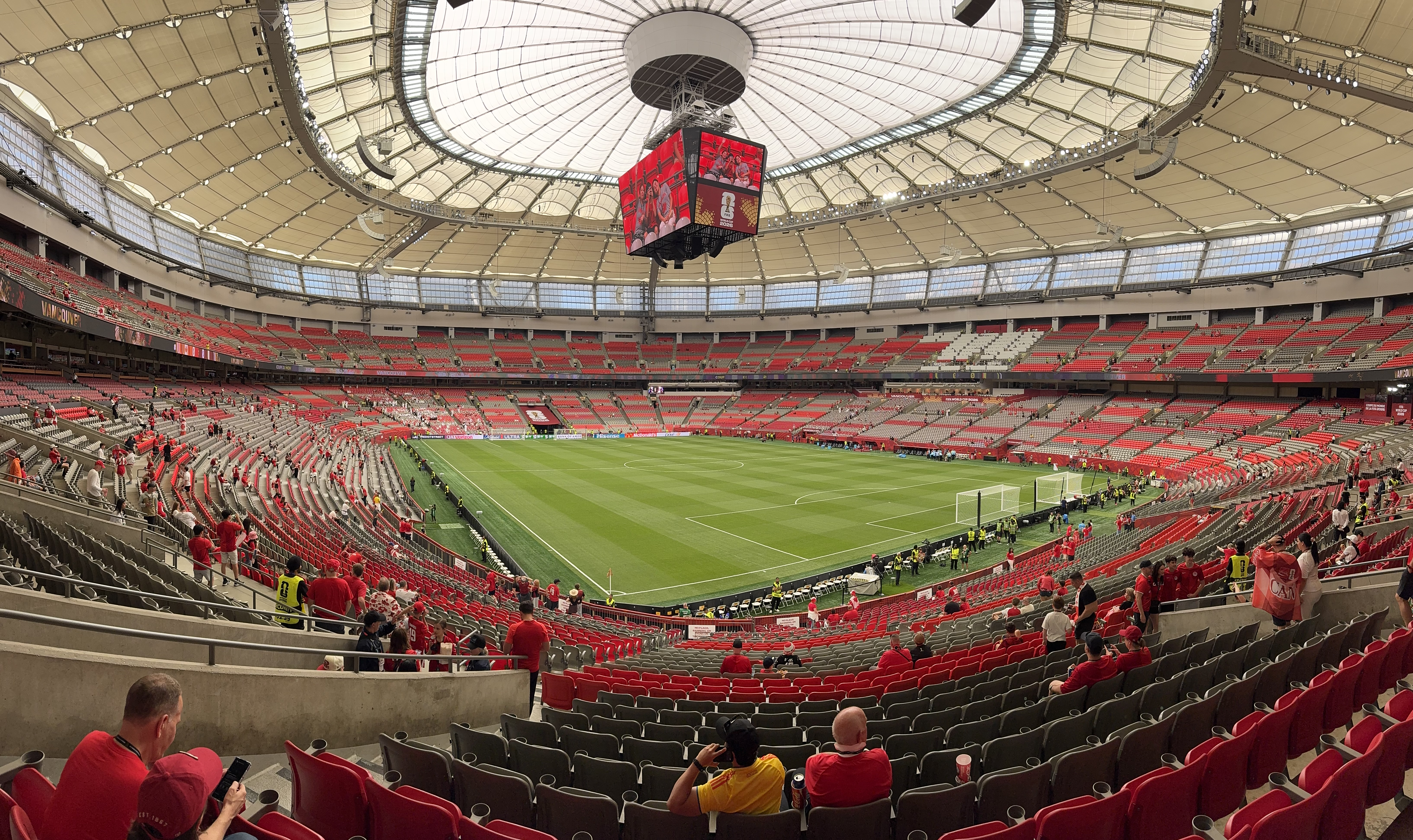
BC Place, Vancouver

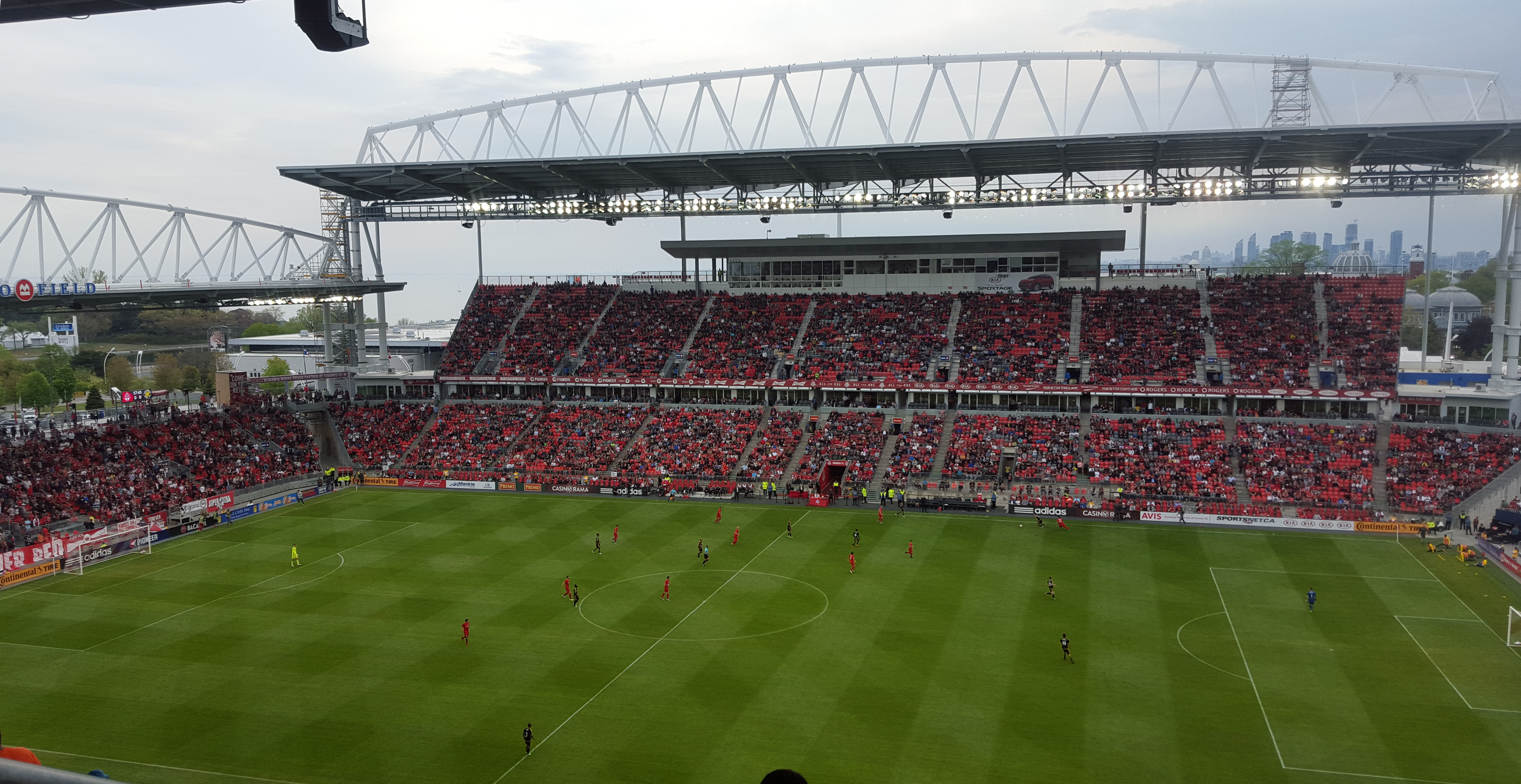
BMO Field, Toronto

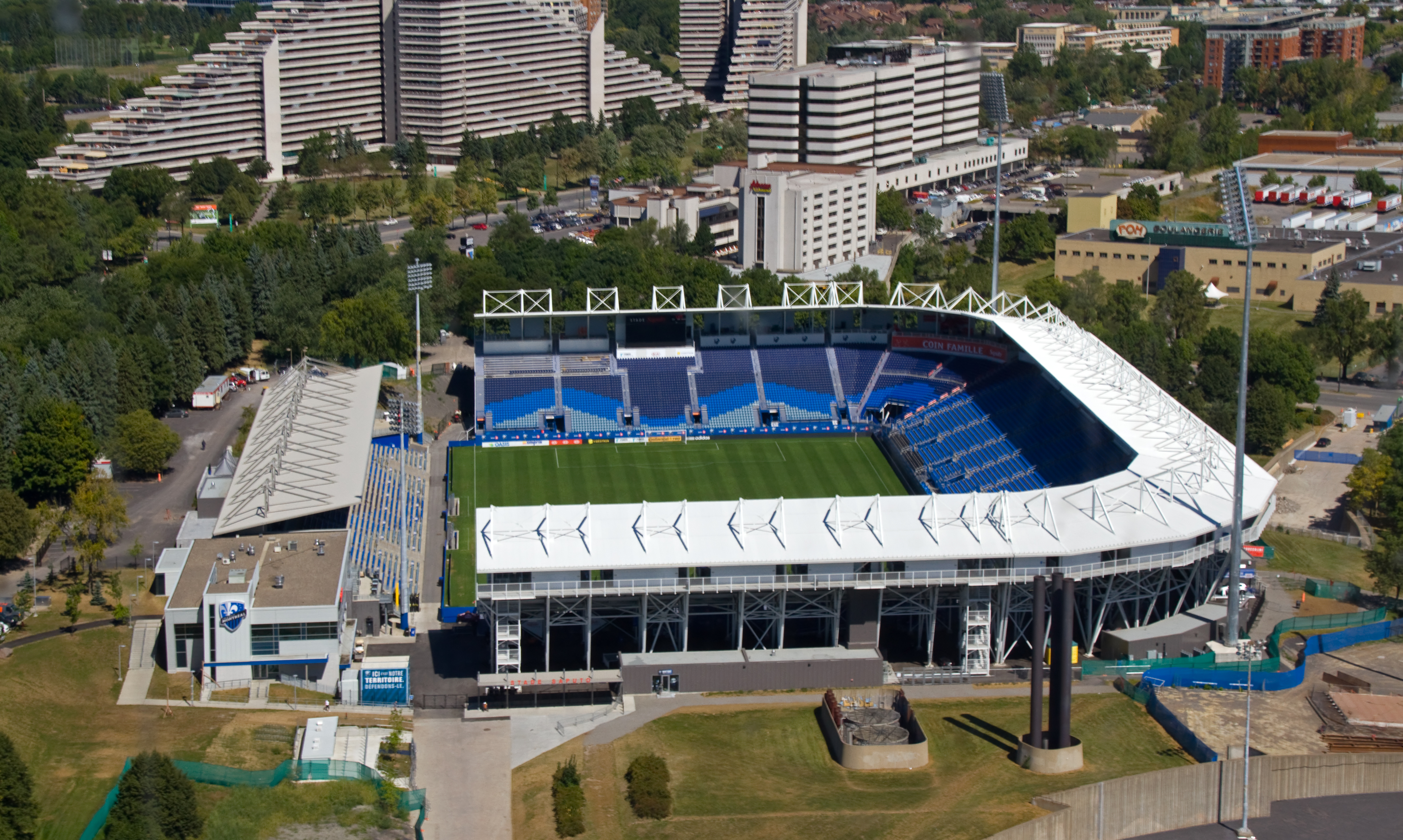
Saputo Stadium, Montreal

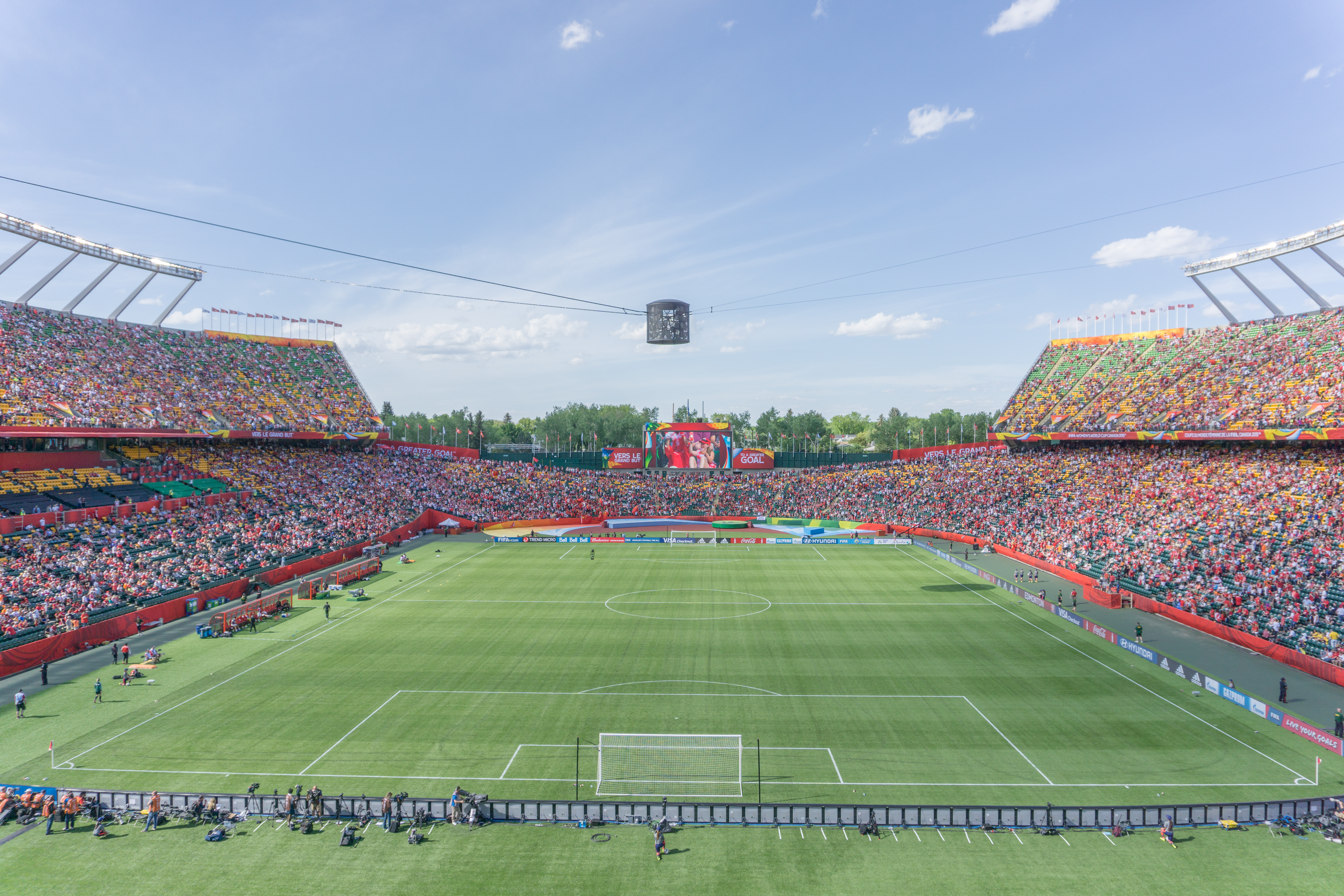
Commonwealth Stadium, Edmonton

BMO Field is Canada's largest natural turf stadium, followed by Saputo Stadium, in Montreal. Canada played their 2018 FIFA World Cup qualifiers at BC Place in Vancouver. During 2022 FIFA World Cup qualifying, Canada used BMO Field in Toronto, Commonwealth Stadium in Edmonton, and Tim Hortons Field in Hamilton. Due to travel restrictions during the COVID-19 pandemic, Canada played their home games for the first and second rounds of 2022 World Cup qualifying in stadiums in the United States.

== Results and fixtures ==
The following is a list of match results in the last twelve months, as well as any future matches that have been scheduled.

Legend

Win Draw Lose Void or postponed Fixture

=== 2026 ===
March 28 Friendly	Canada	2–2	Iceland	Toronto, Ontario
13:00 UTC−4	J. David 67' (pen.), 76' (pen.); Buchanan (red card) 80'	Report	Óskarsson 9', 21'	Stadium: BMO Field; Attendance: 26,328; Referee: Jon Freemon (United States)

March 31 Friendly	Canada	0–0	Tunisia	Toronto, Ontario
21:00 UTC−4		Report		Stadium: BMO Field; Attendance: 22,624; Referee: Keylor Herrera (Costa Rica)
Note: The match was postponed by 90 minutes due to a lightning delay.

June 1 Friendly	Canada	2–0	Uzbekistan	Edmonton, Alberta
19:00 UTC−6	Osorio 58'; Nelson 90+1'	Report		Stadium: Commonwealth Stadium; Attendance: 46,164; Referee: Marco Ortíz (Mexico)

June 5 Friendly	Canada	1–1	Republic of Ireland	Montreal, Quebec
19:30 UTC−4	O'Brien 23' (o.g.)	Report	Ogbene 60'	Stadium: Saputo Stadium; Attendance: 19,619; Referee: Pablo Camacho (Costa Rica)

June 12 2026 World Cup GS	Canada	1–1	Bosnia and Herzegovina	Toronto, Ontario
15:00 UTC−4	Larin 78'	Report	Lukić 21'	Stadium: BMO Field; Attendance: 43,002; Referee: Facundo Tello (Argentina)

June 18 2026 World Cup GS	Canada	6–0	Qatar	Vancouver, British Columbia
15:00 UTC−7	Larin 16'; J. David 29', 45+3', 90+2'; Saliba 64'; Manai 75' (o.g.)	Report		Stadium: BC Place; Attendance: 52,497; Referee: Cristián Garay (Chile)

June 24 2026 World Cup GS	Switzerland	2–1	Canada	Vancouver, British Columbia
12:00 UTC−7	Vargas 46'; Manzambi 57'	Report	P. David 76'	Stadium: BC Place; Attendance: 52,497; Referee: Ramon Abatti (Brazil)

June 28 2026 World Cup R32	South Africa	0–1	Canada	Inglewood, California, United States
12:00 UTC−7		Report	Eustáquio 90+2'	Stadium: SoFi Stadium; Attendance: 69,237; Referee: João Pinheiro (Portugal)

July 4 2026 World Cup R16	Canada	0–3	Morocco	Houston, Texas, United States
12:00 UTC−5		Report	Ounahi 50', 82'; Rahimi 90+8'	Stadium: NRG Stadium; Attendance: 68,777; Referee: Michael Oliver (England)

September 26 Friendly	Canada	1–0	Chile	Toronto, Ontario
19:00 UTC−4	J. David 12'	Report		Stadium: BMO Field; Attendance: 23,310; Referee: Marco Ortíz (Mexico)

October 3 Friendly	Canada	2–0	Peru	Montreal, Quebec
14:00 UTC−4	Shaffelburg 19', 35'	Report		Stadium: Saputo Stadium; Attendance: 19,619; Referee: Jon Freemon (United States)

October 6 Friendly	United States	1–0	Canada	Saint Paul, Minnesota, United States
19:00 UTC−5	Ellis 29'	Report		Stadium: Allianz Field; Attendance: 19,182; Referee: Steven Madrigal (Costa Rica)

November 13 2026–27 Nations League QF 1st leg	Guatemala	2–3	Canada	Guatemala City, Guatemala
20:00 UTC−6	Santis 54'; De Fougerolles 90+4' (o.g.)	Report	Oluwaseyi 18'; Millar 28'; J. David 45+2'	Stadium: Manuel Felipe Carrera Stadium; Referee: Iván Barton (El Salvador)

November 16 2026–27 Nations League QF 2nd leg	Canada	4–1 (7–3 agg.)	Guatemala	Toronto, Ontario
20:00 UTC−5	J. David 39' (pen.); Oluwaseyi 45+1', 62'; Buchanan 53'	Report	Santis 34'	Stadium: BMO Field; Attendance: 17,126; Referee: César Ramos (Mexico)

=== 2027 ===
March 25 2027 Nations League SF	Canada	v	Panama	Inglewood, California, United States
16:00 UTC−7		Report		Stadium: SoFi Stadium

March 28 2027 Nations League Final/3rd place	Canada	v	Mexico or United States	Inglewood, California, United States
--:-- UTC−7				Stadium: SoFi Stadium

=== All-time results ===
The following table shows the Canada all-time international record, correct as of October 7, 2026.

Against	Played	Won	Drawn	Lost	GF	GA	GD
Total	483	182	113	188	615	605	+10

== Coaching staff ==
=== Current staff ===
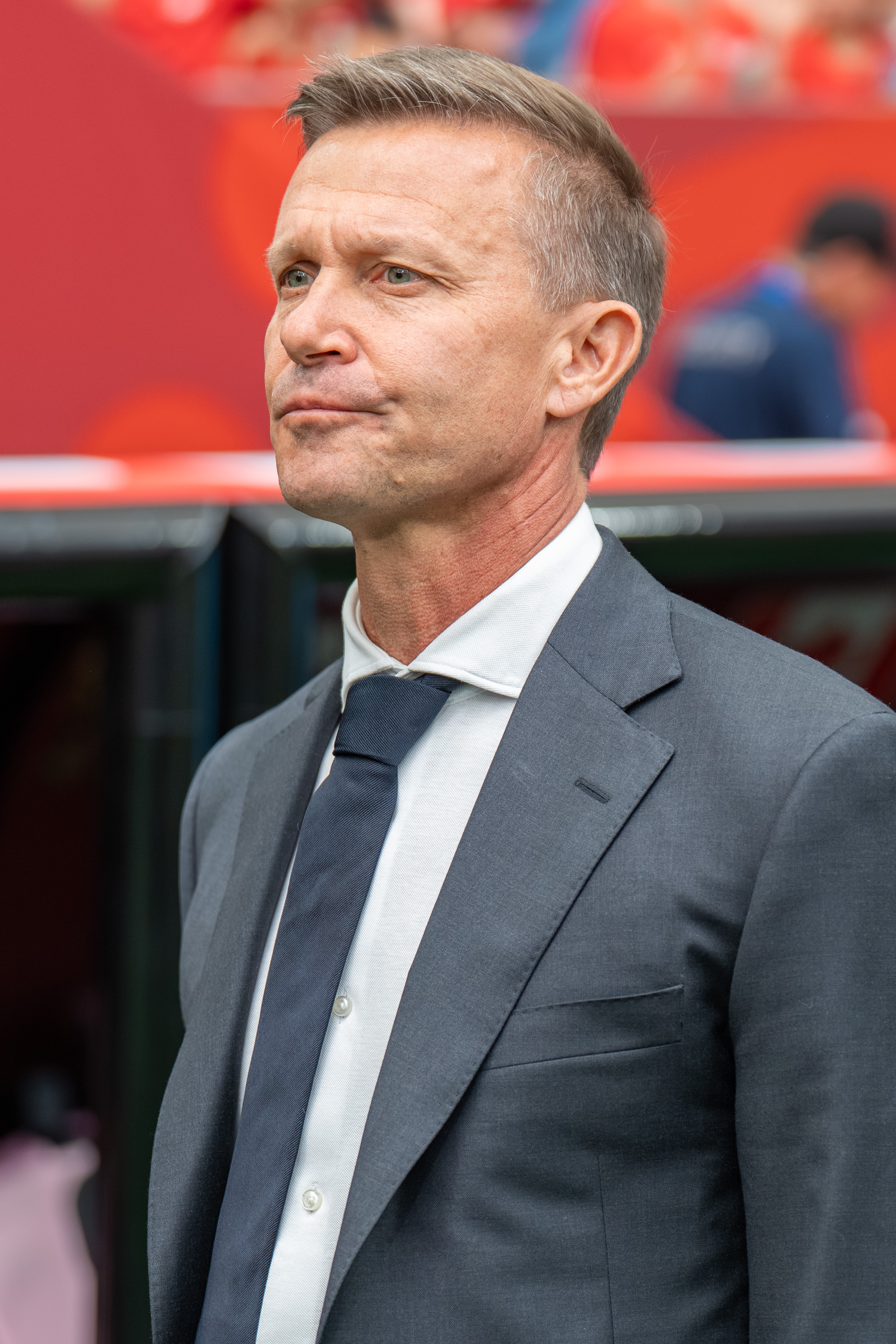
Jesse Marsch is the current head coach of the Canadian national team

As of May 29, 2024

Position	Name
Head coach	(United States) Jesse Marsch
Assistant Coach	(Canada) Mauro Biello
Assistant Coach	(Scotland) Ewan Sharp
Assistant Coach	(France) Pierre Barrieu
Player Development	(Austria) Franz Schiemer
Goalkeeper Coach	(Canada) Paolo Ceccarelli
Video and Data Analyst	(England) Joe Hamilton
Community Representative	(Canada) Paul Stalteri

=== Coaching history ===
Caretaker managers are listed in italics.

- (Canada) Don Petrie (1957)
- (England) Peter Dinsdale (1968–1970)
- (England) Frank Pike (1970–1973)
- (West Germany) Eckhard Krautzun (1973–1977)
- (Canada) Barrie Clarke (1979–1981)
- (England) Tony Waiters (1981–85, 1985–86, 1989–90)
- (Canada) Bruce Wilson (1985)
- (England) Bob Bearpark (1986–1987)
- (Scotland) Tony Taylor (1988–1989)
- (Canada) Bob Lenarduzzi (1989–1990, 1992–1997)
- (Canada) Bruce Twamley (1998)
- (Germany) Holger Osieck (1999–2003)
- (Canada) Colin Miller (2003, 2013)
- (Canada) Frank Yallop (2004–2006)
- (Trinidad and Tobago) Stephen Hart (2006–2007, 2009)
- (Canada) Dale Mitchell (2007–2009)
- (Trinidad and Tobago) Stephen Hart (2009–2012)
- (Portugal) Tony Fonseca (2013)
- (Spain) Benito Floro (2013–2016)
- (Canada) Michael Findlay (2016–2017)
- (Ecuador) Octavio Zambrano (2017–2018)
- (England) John Herdman (2018–2023)
- (Canada) Mauro Biello (2023–2024)
- (United States) Jesse Marsch (2024–present)

=== Head coach records ===
As of November 16, 2026.

Coach	Nationality	Tenure	Record						
Coach	Nationality	Tenure	G	W	L	T	Win %	Win or Tie	Trophies
Barrie Clarke	Canada	January 1980 – December 1981	14	6	2	6	42.86	85.71	0
Tony Waiters	England	1981–85; 1985–86; Oct. 5, 1989 – May 3, 1990	44	11	22	11	25.00	50.00	1
Bruce Wilson	Canada	June 2, 1985 – September 1, 1985	2	1	0	1	50.00	100.00	0
Bob Bearpark	England	August 1986 – late 1987	10	1	5	4	10.00	50.00	0
Tony Taylor	Scotland	December 7, 1987 – December 13, 1988	14	6	6	2	42.86	57.14	0
Bob Lenarduzzi	Canada	1989; 1992 – 1997	61	20	22	19	32.79	63.93	0
Bruce Twamley	Canada	1998 – September 29, 1998	1	1	0	0	100.00	100.00	0
Holger Osieck	Germany	September 29, 1998 – September 2, 2003	46	20	17	9	43.48	63.04	1
Colin Miller	Canada	Sept-Dec 2003 – Jan-July 2013	9	0	7	2	0.00	22.22	0
Frank Yallop	Canada	January 1, 2004 – June 7, 2006	20	8	9	3	40.00	55.00	0
Dale Mitchell	Canada	May 17, 2007 – March 2009	19	5	8	6	26.32	57.89	0
Stephen Hart	Trinidad and Tobago	2006–2007, 2009 – 2009–2012	35	15	9	11	42.86	74.29	0
Tony Fonseca	Portugal	March 2013 – March 25, 2013	2	0	2	0	0.00	0.00	0
Benito Floro	Spain	August 1, 2013 – September 14, 2016	30	9	11	10	30.00	63.33	0
Michael Findlay	Canada	September 14, 2016 – March 17, 2017	6	2	2	2	33.33	66.67	0
Octavio Zambrano	Ecuador	March 17, 2017 – January 8, 2018	8	3	2	3	37.50	75.00	0
John Herdman	England	January 8, 2018 – August 28, 2023	59	37	14	8	62.71	76.27	0
Mauro Biello	Canada	August 28, 2023 – May 13, 2024	4	2	2	0	50.00	50.00	0
Jesse Marsch	United States	May 13, 2024 – present	41	19	8	14	46.34	80.49	0

Caretaker managers are listed in italics.

== Players ==
=== Current squad ===
The following players were called up to the squad for the 2026–27 CONCACAF Nations League quarter-final matches against Guatemala on November 13 and 16, 2026. On November 9, Zorhan Bassong, Charles-Andreas Brym, and Theo Corbeanu were added to the Canadian roster. They replaced Jonathan Osorio and Jacob Shaffelburg, who were both forced to withdraw due to injuries sustained during the final week of the Major League Soccer regular season.
Caps and goals as of November 16, 2026, after the match against Guatemala.

No.	Pos.	Player	Date of birth (age)	Caps	Goals	Club
1	GK	Dayne St. Clair	May 9, 1997 (age 29)	22	0	(United States Soccer Federation) Inter Miami CF
16	GK	Maxime Crépeau	April 11, 1994 (age 32)	39	0	(United States Soccer Federation) Orlando City SC
18	GK	Owen Goodman	November 27, 2003 (age 22)	1	0	(Scottish Football Association) Dundee
2	DF	Jovan Ivanišević	January 19, 2005 (age 21)	3	0	(Football Association of Bosnia and Herzegovina) Sarajevo
3	DF	Ralph Priso	August 2, 2002 (age 24)	7	0	(Canadian Soccer Association) Vancouver Whitecaps FC
4	DF	Luc de Fougerolles	October 12, 2005 (age 21)	23	0	(United States Soccer Federation) Real Salt Lake
5	DF	Joel Waterman	January 24, 1996 (age 30)	19	0	(United States Soccer Federation) Portland Timbers
8	DF	Niko Sigur	September 9, 2003 (age 23)	27	2	(French Football Federation) Toulouse
15	DF	Richard Chukwu	February 25, 2008 (age 18)	3	0	(Canadian Soccer Association) Toronto FC
19	DF	Zorhan Bassong	May 7, 1999 (age 27)	9	0	(United States Soccer Federation) Sporting Kansas City
22	DF	Richie Laryea	January 7, 1995 (age 31)	85	1	(Canadian Soccer Association) Toronto FC
6	MF	Mathieu Choinière	February 7, 1999 (age 27)	29	0	(United States Soccer Federation) Los Angeles FC
11	MF	Liam Millar	September 27, 1999 (age 27)	49	2	(The Football Association) Birmingham City
13	MF	Nathan Saliba	February 7, 2004 (age 22)	23	3	(Royal Spanish Football Federation) Villarreal
14	MF	Kevin Khan	May 30, 2008 (age 18)	1	0	(Royal Dutch Football Association) Feyenoord U21
17	MF	Tajon Buchanan	February 8, 1999 (age 27)	69	9	(Royal Spanish Football Federation) Villarreal
20	MF	Theo Corbeanu	May 17, 2002 (age 24)	7	2	(Canadian Soccer Association) Toronto FC
7	FW	Daniel Jebbison	August 13, 2003 (age 23)	10	0	(The Football Association) Bournemouth
9	FW	Promise David	July 3, 2001 (age 25)	18	4	(The Football Association) Brighton & Hove Albion
10	FW	Jonathan David	January 14, 2000 (age 26)	87	45	(Royal Spanish Football Federation) Atlético Madrid
12	FW	Tani Oluwaseyi	May 15, 2000 (age 26)	33	5	(Royal Spanish Football Federation) Villarreal
21	FW	Jacen Russell-Rowe	September 13, 2002 (age 24)	12	0	(French Football Federation) Toulouse
23	FW	Charles-Andreas Brym	August 8, 1998 (age 28)	14	1	(Royal Dutch Football Association) NAC Breda

=== Recent call-ups ===
The following players have also been called up within the last twelve months.

Pos.	Player	Date of birth (age)	Caps	Goals	Club	Latest call-up
GK	James Pantemis	February 21, 1997 (age 29)	0	0	(United States) Portland Timbers	v. United States, October 6, 2026
GK	Luka Gavran	May 9, 2000 (age 26)	0	0	(Canada) Toronto FC	v. Guatemala, January 17, 2026
DF	Alphonso Davies (captain)	November 2, 2000 (age 26)	60	15	(Germany) Bayern Munich	v. Guatemala, November 13, 2026^{INJ}
DF	Jamie Knight-Lebel	December 24, 2004 (age 21)	5	0	(Scotland) Motherwell	v. United States, October 6, 2026
DF	Luca Petrasso	June 16, 2000 (age 26)	1	0	(Canada) CF Montréal	v. Peru, October 3, 2026
DF	Derek Cornelius	November 25, 1997 (age 28)	48	1	(France) Marseille	v. Chile, September 26, 2026^{INJ}
DF	Alfie Jones	October 7, 1997 (age 29)	2	0	(England) Middlesbrough	v. Chile, September 26, 2026^{INJ}
DF	Alistair Johnston	October 8, 1998 (age 28)	63	1	(Scotland) Celtic	2026 FIFA World Cup
DF	Moïse Bombito	March 30, 2000 (age 26)	23	0	(France) Nice	2026 FIFA World Cup
DF	Kamal Miller	May 16, 1997 (age 29)	52	0	(United States) Portland Timbers	v. Tunisia, March 31, 2026
DF	Jahkeele Marshall-Rutty	June 16, 2004 (age 22)	1	0	(United States) New York Red Bulls	v. Tunisia, March 31, 2026
DF	Noah Abatneh	September 28, 2004 (age 22)	0	0	(Canada) Atlético Ottawa	v. Guatemala, January 17, 2026
DF	Matteo de Brienne	May 22, 2002 (age 24)	0	0	(Sweden) GAIS	v. Guatemala, January 17, 2026
MF	Jonathan Osorio	June 12, 1992 (age 34)	92	10	(Canada) Toronto FC	v. Guatemala, November 13, 2026^{INJ}
MF	Jacob Shaffelburg	November 26, 1999 (age 26)	39	8	(United States) Los Angeles FC	v. Guatemala, November 13, 2026^{INJ}
MF	Stephen Eustáquio (vice-captain)	December 21, 1996 (age 29)	64	5	(Wales) Swansea City	v. United States, October 6, 2026
MF	Justin Smith	February 4, 2003 (age 23)	1	0	(Spain) Eldense	v. United States, October 6, 2026
MF	Samuel Piette	November 12, 1994 (age 32)	70	0	(Canada) CF Montréal	v. Peru, October 3, 2026
MF	Junior Hoilett^{RET}	June 5, 1990 (age 36)	70	17	Unattached	v. Chile, September 26, 2026
MF	Jeevan Badwal	March 11, 2006 (age 20)	0	0	(Canada) Vancouver Whitecaps FC	v. Chile, September 26, 2026^{INJ}
MF	Ismaël Koné	June 16, 2002 (age 24)	42	4	(Italy) Sassuolo	2026 FIFA World Cup ^{INJ}
MF	Ali Ahmed	October 10, 2000 (age 26)	28	1	(England) Norwich City	2026 FIFA World Cup
MF	Jayden Nelson	September 26, 2002 (age 24)	15	3	(England) Bolton Wanderers	2026 FIFA World Cup
MF	Marcelo Flores	October 1, 2003 (age 23)	2	0	(Mexico) Tigres UANL	2026 FIFA World Cup ^{INJ}
MF	Malik Henry	July 23, 2002 (age 24)	0	0	(Canada) Toronto FC	v. Guatemala, January 17, 2026
MF	Shola Jimoh	April 8, 2008 (age 18)	0	0	(Canada) Inter Toronto FC	v. Guatemala, January 17, 2026
FW	Marcus Caldeira	October 14, 2004 (age 22)	0	0	(United States) Minnesota United FC	v. United States, October 6, 2026
FW	Cyle Larin	April 17, 1995 (age 31)	95	32	(England) Southampton	v. Peru, October 3, 2026^{INJ}
FW	Aribim Pepple	December 25, 2002 (age 23)	0	0	(England) Plymouth Argyle	v. Tunisia, March 31, 2026
FW	Marius Aiyenero	May 23, 2008 (age 18)	0	0	(United States) Los Angeles FC 2	v. Guatemala, January 17, 2026
FW	Tiago Coimbra	January 17, 2004 (age 22)	0	0	(Sweden) IFK Göteborg	v. Guatemala, January 17, 2026
FW	Rayan Elloumi ^{NEL}	September 17, 2007 (age 19)	0	0	(Canada) Vancouver Whitecaps FC	v. Guatemala, January 17, 2026
FW	Theo Bair	August 27, 1999 (age 27)	7	1	(England) Bolton Wanderers	v. Venezuela, November 18, 2025
INJ = Withdrew due to injury; NEL = Not eligible. Cap tied to another nation; PRE = Preliminary squad; RET = Retired from the national team; TRP = Invited to the camp as a training player; WD = Withdrew for non-injury reason; WNE = Withdrew; not eligible to play

=== Previous squads ===
FIFA World Cup

- 1986 FIFA World Cup squad
- 2022 FIFA World Cup squad
- 2026 FIFA World Cup squad

FIFA Confederations Cup

- 2001 FIFA Confederations Cup squad

Summer Olympics

- 1904 Summer Olympics squad
- 1976 Summer Olympics squad
- 1984 Summer Olympics squad

CONCACAF Gold Cup / Championship

- 1977 CONCACAF Championship squad
- 1981 CONCACAF Championship squad
- 1985 CONCACAF Championship squad
- 1991 CONCACAF Gold Cup squad
- 1993 CONCACAF Gold Cup squad
- 1996 CONCACAF Gold Cup squad
- 2000 CONCACAF Gold Cup squad
- 2002 CONCACAF Gold Cup squad
- 2003 CONCACAF Gold Cup squad
- 2005 CONCACAF Gold Cup squad
- 2007 CONCACAF Gold Cup squad
- 2009 CONCACAF Gold Cup squad
- 2011 CONCACAF Gold Cup squad
- 2013 CONCACAF Gold Cup squad
- 2015 CONCACAF Gold Cup squad
- 2017 CONCACAF Gold Cup squad
- 2019 CONCACAF Gold Cup squad
- 2021 CONCACAF Gold Cup squad
- 2023 CONCACAF Gold Cup squad
- 2025 CONCACAF Gold Cup squad

CONCACAF Nations League Finals

- 2023 Nations League Finals squad
- 2025 Nations League Finals squad

CONMEBOL/CONCACAF Copa América

- 2024 Copa América squad

== Individual records ==
As of November 16, 2026, after the match against Guatemala.
Players in bold are still active with the national team.

=== Most appearances ===
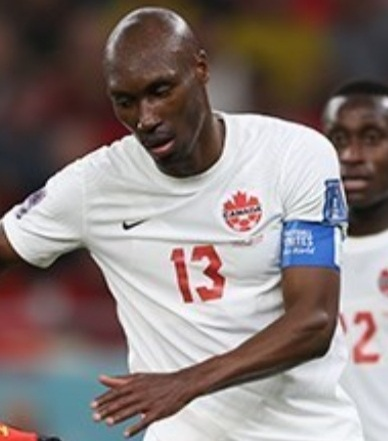
Atiba Hutchinson is Canada's most capped player with 104 appearances.

Rank	Player	Caps	Goals	Career
1	Atiba Hutchinson	104	9	2003–2023
2	**Cyle Larin**	95	32	2014–present
3	**Jonathan Osorio**	92	10	2013–present
4	Julián de Guzmán	89	4	2002–2016
5	**Jonathan David**	87	45	2018–present
6	**Richie Laryea**	85	1	2019–present
7	Paul Stalteri	84	7	1997–2010
8	Randy Samuel	82	0	1983–1997
9	Dwayne De Rosario	81	22	1998–2015
10	Milan Borjan	80	0	2011–2023

=== Top goalscorers ===
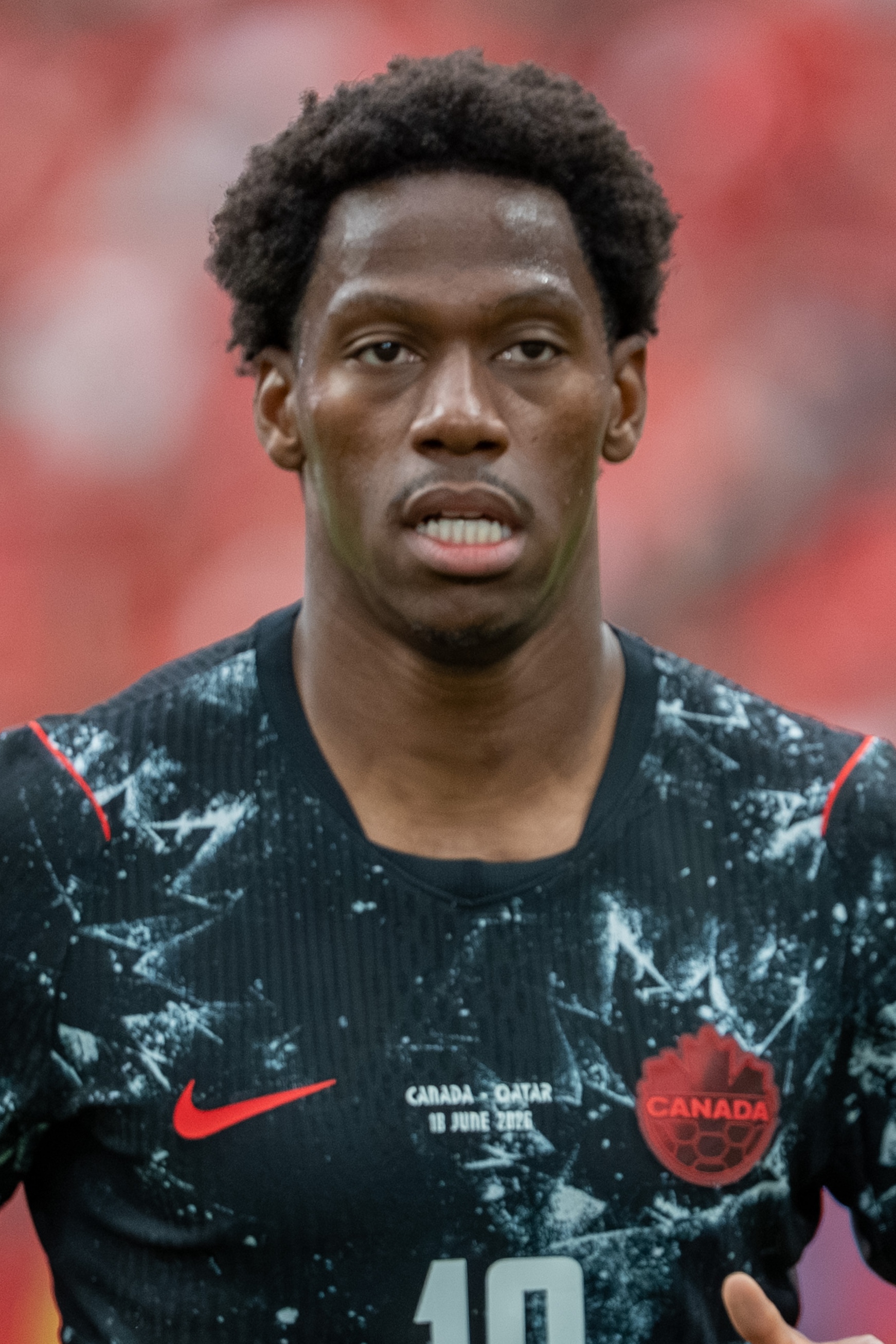
Jonathan David is Canada's all-time top scorer with 45 goals.

Rank	Player	Goals	Caps	Ratio	Career
1	**Jonathan David** (list)	45	87	0.52	2018–present
2	**Cyle Larin** (list)	32	95	0.34	2014–present
3	Dwayne De Rosario (list)	22	81	0.27	1998–2015
4	Lucas Cavallini	19	40	0.48	2012–2023
4	John Catliff	19	43	0.44	1984–1994
4	Dale Mitchell	19	55	0.35	1980–1993
7	Tosaint Ricketts	17	61	0.28	2011–2020
7	Junior Hoilett	17	70	0.25	2015–2026
9	Alex Bunbury	16	66	0.25	1986–1997
10	Ali Gerba	15	30	0.5	2005–2011
10	**Alphonso Davies**	15	60	0.25	2017–present

== Competitive record ==
Champions Runners-up Third place Tournament played fully or partially on home soil

=== FIFA World Cup ===
FIFA World Cup record										Qualification record					
Year	Result	Position	Pld	W	D	L	GF	GA	Squad	Pld	W	D	L	GF	GA
1930 to 1954	Did not enter									Did not enter					
(Sweden) 1958	Did not qualify									4	2	0	2	8	8
(Chile) 1962	Withdrew									Withdrew					
(England) 1966	Did not enter									Did not enter					
(Mexico) 1970	Did not qualify									4	2	1	1	8	3
(West Germany) 1974	Did not qualify									4	1	1	2	6	7
(Argentina) 1978	Did not qualify									10	4	3	3	12	11
(Spain) 1982	Did not qualify									9	2	6	1	10	9
(Mexico) 1986	Group stage	24th	3	0	0	3	0	5	Squad	8	5	3	0	10	4
(Italy) 1990	Did not qualify									2	1	0	1	3	3
(United States) 1994	Did not qualify									14	6	4	4	22	20
(France) 1998	Did not qualify									16	6	4	6	15	21
(South Korea) (Japan) 2002	Did not qualify									8	2	3	3	2	8
(Germany) 2006	Did not qualify									8	3	2	3	12	8
(South Africa) 2010	Did not qualify									8	2	2	4	13	14
(Brazil) 2014	Did not qualify									12	7	3	2	24	11
(Russia) 2018	Did not qualify									10	5	2	3	15	9
(Qatar) 2022	Group stage	31st	3	0	0	3	2	7	Squad	20	14	4	2	54	8
(Canada) (Mexico) (United States) 2026	Round of 16	14th	5	2	1	2	9	6	Squad	Qualified as co-hosts					
(Morocco) (Portugal) (Spain) 2030	To be determined									To be determined					
(Saudi Arabia) 2034	To be determined									To be determined					
Total: 3/23	Round of 16	14th	11	2	1	8	11	18	—	137	62	38	37	215	144

FIFA World Cup history
First match	Canada 0–1 France (June 1, 1986; León, Mexico)
Biggest win	Canada 6–0 Qatar (June 18, 2026; Vancouver, Canada)
Biggest defeat	Croatia 4–1 Canada (November 27, 2022; Al Rayyan, Qatar); Canada 0–3 Morocco (July 4, 2026; Houston, United States)
Best result	14th – Round of 16 (2026)
Worst result	31st – Group stage (2022)

=== CONCACAF Gold Cup ===
CONCACAF Championship / Gold Cup record										Qualification record					
Year	Result	Position	Pld	W	D*	L	GF	GA	Squad	Pld	W	D*	L	GF	GA
(El Salvador) 1963	Did not enter									Did not enter					
(Guatemala) 1965	Did not enter									Did not enter					
(Honduras) 1967	Did not enter									Did not enter					
(Costa Rica) 1969	Did not enter									Did not enter					
(Trinidad and Tobago) 1971	Did not enter									Did not enter					
(Haiti) 1973	Did not qualify									4	1	1	2	6	7
(Mexico) 1977	Fourth place	4th	5	2	1	2	7	8	Squad	5	2	2	1	5	3
(Honduras) 1981	Fourth place	4th	5	1	3	1	6	6	Squad	4	1	3	0	4	3
1985	Champions	1st	8	5	3	0	11	4	Squad	Qualified automatically					
1989	Did not qualify									2	1	0	1	3	3
(United States) 1991	Group stage	6th	3	1	0	2	6	9	Squad	Qualified automatically					
(Mexico) (United States) 1993	Group stage	6th	3	0	2	1	3	11	Squad	Qualified automatically					
(United States) 1996	Group stage	5th	2	1	0	1	4	5	Squad	Qualified automatically					
(United States) 1998	Withdrew									Withdrew					
(United States) 2000	Champions	1st	5	3	2	0	7	3	Squad	3	2	1	0	4	2
(United States) 2002	Third place	3rd	5	2	2	1	5	4	Squad	Qualified automatically					
(Mexico) (United States) 2003	Group stage	9th	2	1	0	1	1	2	Squad	Qualified automatically					
(United States) 2005	Group stage	9th	3	1	0	2	2	4	Squad	Qualified automatically					
(United States) 2007	Semi-finals	3rd	5	3	0	2	9	5	Squad	Qualified automatically					
(United States) 2009	Quarter-finals	5th	4	2	1	1	4	3	Squad	Qualified automatically					
(United States) 2011	Group stage	9th	3	1	1	1	2	3	Squad	Qualified automatically					
(United States) 2013	Group stage	11th	3	0	1	2	0	3	Squad	Qualified automatically					
(Canada) (United States) 2015	Group stage	10th	3	0	2	1	0	1	Squad	Qualified automatically					
(United States) 2017	Quarter-finals	6th	4	1	2	1	6	5	Squad	Qualified automatically					
(Costa Rica) (Jamaica) (United States) 2019	Quarter-finals	6th	4	2	0	2	14	6	Squad	4	4	0	0	18	1
(United States) 2021	Semi-finals	4th	5	3	0	2	11	5	Squad	4	3	0	1	10	4
(Canada) (United States) 2023	Quarter-finals	6th	4	1	3	0	8	6	Squad	4	3	0	1	11	3
(Canada) (United States) 2025	Quarter-finals	6th	4	2	2	0	10	2	Squad	2	2	0	0	4	0
2027	Qualified									2	2	0	0	7	3
Total	2 Titles	21/29	80	32	25	23	116	95	—	34	21	7	6	72	29

*Denotes draws include knockout matches decided via penalty shoot-out.

CONCACAF Championship / Gold Cup history
First match	Canada 1–2 El Salvador (October 8, 1977; Monterrey, Mexico)
Biggest win	Canada 7–0 Cuba (June 23, 2019; Charlotte, United States)
Biggest defeat	Mexico 8–0 Canada (July 18, 1993; Mexico City, Mexico)
Best result	Champions (1985, 2000)
Worst result	11th – Group stage (2013)

=== CONCACAF Nations League ===
CONCACAF Nations League record
League phase / quarter-finals											Final phase								
Season	Division	Group	Seed	Pld	W	D	L	GF	GA	P/R	Finals	Result	Pld	W	D	L	GF	GA	Squad
2019–20	A	A	—	4	3	0	1	10	4	Same position	(United States) 2021	Did not qualify – Eliminated in group stage							
2022–23	A	C	3rd	4	3	0	1	11	3	Same position	(United States) 2023	Runners-up	2	1	0	1	2	2	Squad
2023–24	A	Bye	3rd	2	1	0	1	4	4	Same position	(United States) 2024	Did not qualify – Eliminated in quarter-finals							
2024–25	A	Bye	2nd	2	2	0	0	4	0	Same position	(United States) 2025	Third place	2	1	0	1	2	3	Squad
2026–27	A	Bye	3rd	2	2	0	0	7	3	Same position	(United States) 2027	Qualified							
Total				14	11	0	3	36	14	—	Total	Runners-up	4	2	0	2	4	5	—

CONCACAF Nations League history
First match	Canada 6–0 Cuba (September 7, 2019; Toronto, Canada)
Biggest win	Canada 6–0 Cuba (September 7, 2019; Toronto, Canada)
Biggest defeat	United States 4–1 Canada (November 15, 2019; Orlando, United States)
Best result	Runners-up (2022–23)
Worst result	Group stage (2019–20)

=== Copa América ===
Copa América record										Qualification record					
Year	Result	Position	Pld	W	D	L	GF	GA	Squad	Pld	W	D	L	GF	GA
(Colombia) 2001	Withdrew								Squad	—					
(United States) 2016	Did not qualify									3 (Note: Includes matches at the 2015 CONCACAF Gold Cup)	0	2	1	0	1
(United States) 2024	Fourth place	4th	6	1	3	2	4	7	Squad	3 (Note: Includes 2023–24 CONCACAF Nations League A matches and a qualifying play-off match)	2	0	1	6	4
Total	Fourth place	1/3	6	1	3	2	4	7	—	6	2	2	2	6	5

Copa América history
First match	Argentina 2–0 Canada (June 20, 2024; Atlanta, United States)
Biggest win	Peru 0–1 Canada (June 25, 2024; Kansas City, United States)
Biggest defeat	Argentina 2–0 Canada (June 20, 2024; Atlanta, United States); Argentina 2–0 Canada (July 9, 2024; East Rutherford, United States)
Best result	Fourth place (2024)
Worst result	—

=== FIFA Confederations Cup ===
FIFA Confederations Cup record
Year	Round	Position	Pld	W	D*	L	GF	GA	Squad
(Saudi Arabia) 1992	Did not qualify								
(Saudi Arabia) 1995	Did not qualify								
(Saudi Arabia) 1997	Did not qualify								
(Mexico) 1999	Did not qualify								
(South Korea) (Japan) 2001	Group stage	7th	3	0	1	2	0	5	Squad
(France) 2003	Did not qualify								
(Germany) 2005	Did not qualify								
(South Africa) 2009	Did not qualify								
(Brazil) 2013	Did not qualify								
(Russia) 2017	Did not qualify								
Total	Group stage	1/10	3	0	1	2	0	5	—

*Denotes draws include knockout matches decided via penalty shoot-out.

FIFA Confederations Cup history
First match	Japan 3–0 Canada (May 31, 2001; Niigata, Japan)
Biggest win	—
Biggest defeat	Japan 3–0 Canada (May 31, 2001; Niigata, Japan)
Best result	Group stage (2001)
Worst result	Group stage (2001)

=== Olympic Games ===
Olympic Games record
Year	Result	Position	Pld	W	D	L	GF	GA
(France) 1900	Did not enter							
(United States) 1904	Gold medal	1st	2	2	0	0	11	0
(United Kingdom) 1908 to (Japan) 1964	Did not enter							
(Mexico) 1968	Did not qualify							
(West Germany) 1972	Did not qualify							
(Canada) 1976	Group stage	13th	2	0	0	2	2	5
(Soviet Union) 1980	Did not qualify							
(United States) 1984	Quarter-finals	6th	3	1	1	1	4	3
(South Korea) 1988	Did not qualify							
Since 1992	The under-23 team participated							
Total	Gold medal	3/19	7	3	1	3	17	8

=== North American Nations Cup ===
North American Nations Cup record
Year	Result	Position	Pld	W	D	L	GF	GA
(Canada) 1990	Champions	1st	2	2	0	0	3	1
(United States) 1991	Third place	3rd	2	0	0	2	0	5
Total	1 Title	2/2	4	2	0	2	3	6

== Head-to-head record ==
As of November 16, 2026, the complete official match record of the Canada men's national team comprises 487 matches: 185 wins, 116 draws and 186 losses. During these matches, the team scored 628 times and conceded 608 goals. Canada's highest winning margin is 11 goals, which was achieved against the Cayman Islands in 2021 (11–0). Their longest winning streak is eight wins, and their unbeaten record is 15 consecutive official matches.

== Honours ==
=== Continental ===
- CONCACAF Championship / Gold Cup
  - Champions (2): 1985, 2000
  - (bronze) Third place (1): 2002
- CONCACAF Nations League
  - (silver) Runners-up (1): 2022–23
  - (bronze) Third place (1): 2024–25

=== Subcontinental ===
- North American Nations Cup
  - (gold) Champions (1): 1990

=== Friendly ===
- Sir Stanley Matthews Cup (1): 1988
- Canadian Shield (1): 2025

=== Summary ===
Including honours in competitions directly organized/recognized by FIFA or an affiliated confederation.

Competition	1st place, gold medalist(s)	2nd place, silver medalist(s)	3rd place, bronze medalist(s)	Total
CONCACAF Championship / Gold Cup	2	0	1	3
CONCACAF Nations League	0	1	1	2
Total	2	1	2	5

== Kits ==
=== Kit suppliers ===
Brand	Period
(Germany) Adidas	1986–1992
(United States) Score	1993–1995
(England) Umbro	1996–1998
(Germany) Adidas	1999–2010
(England) Umbro	2011–2018
(United States) Nike	2019–present

== See also ==
- Canada men's national under-23 soccer team
- Canada men's national under-20 soccer team
- Canada men's national under-17 soccer team
- Canada men's national under-15 soccer team
- Canada men's national futsal team
- Canada men's national beach soccer team
- Canada women's national soccer team
- Soccer in Canada

== Notes ==
Preceded by 1949 Mexico	NAFU Champions; 1990 (first title)	Succeeded by 1991 Mexico
