= Barrieu =

Barrieu is a surname. Notable people with the surname include:

- Pauline Barrieu (fl. from 1997), French financial statistician and probability theorist
- Pierre Barrieu (born 1972), French football coach

== See also ==
- Barrie (name)
