= Don Petrie =

Canadian soccer player (1922–2015)

Personal information
- Full name: Donald John Mackay Petrie
- Date of birth: 22 May 1922
- Place of birth: Vancouver, British Columbia, Canada
- Date of death: 6 July 2015 (aged 93)
- Position: Centre-half

Senior career*
Years	Team	Apps	(Gls)
1942–1943	Vancouver St. Saviour's		
1943–1946	University of British Columbia		
1946–1947	Vancouver St. Saviour's		
1947–1948	Vancouver City		

Managerial career
- 1956: Vancouver Halecos
- 1957: Canada
- * Club domestic league appearances and goals

Donald John Mackay Petrie (May 22, 1922 – July 6, 2015) was a Canadian soccer player and head coach.

== Career ==
Petrie was born in Vancouver, British Columbia. A centre-half, he played for Vancouver St. Saviour's between 1942 and 1943, University of British Columbia between 1943 and 1946, St. Saviours again between 1946 and 1947, and Vancouver City between 1947–1948.

Petrie coached the Vancouver Halecos, helping them win the Canadian club championship in 1956. He also coached the Canadian national team in 1957, in World Cup qualifying games against Mexico and the United States.

== Personal life ==
Petrie was married to Grace Petrie and resided in White Rock, British Columbia. He had three children—Don, Robert, and Brenda, and four grandchildren—Kelly, Whitney, Adam, and Steven. Petrie died on July 6, 2015, at the age of 93.

In April 2000, Petrie was inducted as a Builder into the Canadian Soccer Hall of Fame.
