= 2023 CONCACAF Nations League Finals squads =

The 2023 CONCACAF Nations League Finals was an international football tournament held in the United States from 15 to 18 June 2023. The four national teams involved in the tournament were required to register a squad of 23 players, of which three had to be goalkeepers. Only players in these squads were eligible to take part in the tournament.

Each national team had to submit a provisional list of up to 60 players (five of whom had to be goalkeepers) to CONCACAF no later than thirty days prior to the start of the tournament and players could not be added to these lists after the specified deadline. The final list of 23 players per national team had to be submitted to CONCACAF by 5 June 2023, ten days before the opening match of the tournament. All players in the final list had to be chosen from the respective provisional list. In the event that a player on the submitted final list suffered a serious injury or had medical reasons, he could be replaced up to 24 hours before the kick-off of his team's first match of the tournament, provided that it was approved by the CONCACAF Medical Committee. The replacement player had to come from the provisional list and would be assigned the shirt number of the replaced player.

CONCACAF published the provisional rosters on 19 May 2023. The final 23-man rosters were published on 7 June 2023.

The age listed for each player is their age as of 15 June 2023, the first day of the tournament. The numbers of caps and goals listed for each player do not include any matches played after the start of the tournament. The club listed is the club for which the player last played a competitive match prior to the tournament. The nationality for each club reflects the national association (not the league) to which the club is affiliated. A flag is included for coaches who are of a different nationality than their own national team.

== United States ==
The United States' 60-man provisional list was announced by CONCACAF on 19 May 2023, and was reduced to 24 players on 1 June 2023. The final squad was announced on 6 June 2023.

Head coach: B. J. Callaghan

No.	Pos.	Player	Date of birth (age)	Caps	Goals	Club
1	GK	Matt Turner	24 June 1994 (aged 28)	26	0	(The Football Association) Arsenal
2	DF	Sergiño Dest	3 November 2000 (aged 22)	25	2	(Italian Football Federation) Milan
3	DF	Walker Zimmerman	19 May 1993 (aged 30)	40	3	(United States Soccer Federation) Nashville SC
4	DF	Chris Richards	28 March 2000 (aged 23)	8	0	(The Football Association) Crystal Palace
5	DF	Antonee Robinson	8 August 1997 (aged 25)	34	2	(The Football Association) Fulham
6	MF	Yunus Musah	29 November 2002 (aged 20)	25	0	(Royal Spanish Football Federation) Valencia
7	MF	Giovanni Reyna	13 November 2002 (aged 20)	18	4	(German Football Association) Borussia Dortmund
8	MF	Weston McKennie	28 August 1998 (aged 24)	43	11	(The Football Association) Leeds United
9	FW	Ricardo Pepi	9 January 2003 (aged 20)	14	6	(Royal Dutch Football Association) Groningen
10	FW	Christian Pulisic (captain)	18 September 1998 (aged 24)	58	23	(The Football Association) Chelsea
11	FW	Brenden Aaronson	22 October 2000 (aged 22)	30	7	(The Football Association) Leeds United
12	DF	Miles Robinson	14 March 1997 (aged 26)	22	3	(United States Soccer Federation) Atlanta United FC
13	GK	Drake Callender	7 October 1997 (aged 25)	0	0	(United States Soccer Federation) Inter Miami CF
14	MF	Luca de la Torre	23 May 1998 (aged 25)	14	0	(Royal Spanish Football Federation) Celta Vigo
15	MF	Johnny Cardoso	20 September 2001 (aged 21)	6	0	(Brazilian Football Confederation) Internacional
16	MF	Alan Soñora	3 August 1998 (aged 24)	3	0	(Mexican Football Federation) Juárez
17	FW	Alejandro Zendejas	7 February 1998 (aged 25)	3	1	(Mexican Football Federation) América
18	GK	Sean Johnson	31 May 1989 (aged 34)	12	0	(Canadian Soccer Association) Toronto FC
19	DF	Joe Scally	31 December 2002 (aged 20)	4	0	(German Football Association) Borussia Mönchengladbach
20	FW	Folarin Balogun	3 July 2001 (aged 21)	0	0	(French Football Federation) Reims
21	FW	Timothy Weah	22 February 2000 (aged 23)	29	4	(French Football Federation) Lille
22	FW	Taylor Booth	31 May 2001 (aged 22)	2	0	(Royal Dutch Football Association) Utrecht
23	DF	Auston Trusty	12 August 1998 (aged 24)	1	0	(The Football Association) Birmingham City

== Panama ==
Panama's 60-man provisional list was announced by CONCACAF on 19 May 2023. The final squad was announced on 7 June 2023.

Head coach: (Spain) Thomas Christiansen

No.	Pos.	Player	Date of birth (age)	Caps	Goals	Club
1	GK	Luis Mejía	16 March 1991 (aged 32)	49	0	(Football Federation of Chile) Unión Española
2	DF	César Blackman	2 April 1998 (aged 25)	11	0	(Slovak Football Association) DAC Dunajská Streda
3	DF	Harold Cummings	1 March 1992 (aged 31)	86	1	(Venezuelan Football Federation) Monagas
4	DF	Fidel Escobar	9 January 1995 (aged 28)	65	2	(Costa Rican Football Federation) Saprissa
5	DF	Roderick Miller	3 April 1992 (aged 31)	35	2	(Association of Football Federations of Azerbaijan) Turan Tovuz
6	MF	Cristian Martínez	6 February 1997 (aged 26)	25	0	(Saudi Arabian Football Federation) Najran
7	MF	Jovani Welch	7 December 1999 (aged 23)	6	0	(Portuguese Football Federation) Académico de Viseu
8	MF	Adalberto Carrasquilla	28 November 1998 (aged 24)	39	1	(United States Soccer Federation) Houston Dynamo FC
9	FW	Azarías Londoño	21 June 2001 (aged 21)	3	0	(National Football Federation of Guatemala) Comunicaciones
10	MF	Yoel Bárcenas	23 October 1993 (aged 29)	71	5	(Mexican Football Federation) Mazatlán
11	FW	Ismael Díaz	12 May 1997 (aged 26)	23	5	(Ecuadorian Football Federation) Universidad Católica
12	GK	César Samudio	26 March 1994 (aged 29)	2	0	(National Autonomous Federation of Football of Honduras) Marathón
13	MF	Freddy Góndola	18 September 1995 (aged 27)	14	1	(Costa Rican Football Federation) Alajuelense
14	DF	Eduardo Anderson	31 January 2001 (aged 22)	6	0	(Costa Rican Football Federation) San Carlos
15	DF	Eric Davis	31 March 1991 (aged 32)	76	5	(Slovak Football Association) DAC Dunajská Streda
16	DF	Andrés Andrade	16 October 1998 (aged 24)	21	1	(German Football Association) Arminia Bielefeld
17	FW	José Fajardo	18 August 1993 (aged 29)	31	5	(Peruvian Football Federation) Cusco
18	FW	Cecilio Waterman	13 April 1991 (aged 32)	24	8	(Football Federation of Chile) Cobresal
19	MF	Alberto Quintero	18 December 1987 (aged 35)	130	7	(Peruvian Football Federation) Cienciano
20	MF	Aníbal Godoy (captain)	10 February 1990 (aged 33)	126	4	(United States Soccer Federation) Nashville SC
21	MF	César Yanis	28 January 1996 (aged 27)	39	3	(Panamanian Football Federation) Potros del Este
22	GK	Orlando Mosquera	25 December 1994 (aged 28)	11	0	(Venezuelan Football Federation) Monagas
23	DF	Michael Amir Murillo	11 February 1996 (aged 27)	63	6	(Royal Belgian Football Association) Anderlecht

== Canada ==
Canada's 53-man provisional list was announced by CONCACAF on 19 May 2023. The final squad was announced on 7 June 2023. On 10 June, defender Derek Cornelius withdrew from the squad due to injury and was replaced by Moïse Bombito.

Head coach: (England) John Herdman

No.	Pos.	Player	Date of birth (age)	Caps	Goals	Club
1	GK	Dayne St. Clair	9 May 1997 (aged 26)	2	0	(United States Soccer Federation) Minnesota United FC
2	DF	Alistair Johnston	8 October 1998 (aged 24)	34	1	(Scottish Football Association) Celtic
3	DF	Sam Adekugbe	16 January 1995 (aged 28)	39	1	(Turkish Football Federation) Galatasaray
4	DF	Kamal Miller	16 May 1997 (aged 26)	32	0	(United States Soccer Federation) Inter Miami CF
5	DF	Steven Vitória	11 January 1987 (aged 36)	39	4	(Portuguese Football Federation) Chaves
6	DF	Dominick Zator	18 September 1994 (aged 28)	0	0	(Polish Football Association) Korona Kielce
7	MF	Stephen Eustáquio	21 December 1996 (aged 26)	30	3	(Portuguese Football Federation) Porto
8	MF	David Wotherspoon	16 January 1990 (aged 33)	11	1	(Scottish Football Association) St Johnstone
9	FW	Lucas Cavallini	28 December 1992 (aged 30)	35	18	(Mexican Football Federation) Tijuana
10	FW	Junior Hoilett	5 June 1990 (aged 33)	53	14	(The Football Association) Reading
11	FW	Tajon Buchanan	8 February 1999 (aged 24)	31	4	(Royal Belgian Football Association) Club Brugge
12	MF	Victor Loturi	21 May 2001 (aged 22)	0	0	(Scottish Football Association) Ross County
13	MF	Atiba Hutchinson (captain)	8 February 1983 (aged 40)	103	9	(Turkish Football Federation) Beşiktaş
14	DF	Moïse Bombito	30 March 2000 (aged 23)	0	0	(United States Soccer Federation) Colorado Rapids
15	MF	Ismaël Koné	16 June 2002 (aged 20)	11	1	(The Football Association) Watford
16	GK	Tom McGill	25 March 2000 (aged 23)	0	0	(The Football Association) Brighton & Hove Albion
17	FW	Cyle Larin	17 April 1995 (aged 28)	60	28	(Royal Spanish Football Federation) Valladolid
18	GK	Milan Borjan	23 October 1987 (aged 35)	72	0	(Football Association of Serbia) Red Star Belgrade
19	FW	Alphonso Davies	2 November 2000 (aged 22)	39	13	(German Football Association) Bayern Munich
20	FW	Jonathan David	14 January 2000 (aged 23)	40	24	(French Football Federation) Lille
21	MF	Jonathan Osorio	12 June 1992 (aged 31)	62	8	(Canadian Soccer Association) Toronto FC
22	DF	Richie Laryea	7 January 1995 (aged 28)	39	1	(Canadian Soccer Association) Toronto FC
23	DF	Scott Kennedy	31 March 1997 (aged 26)	10	0	(German Football Association) Jahn Regensburg

== Mexico ==
Mexico announced their 40-man provisional list on 19 May 2023. The final squad was announced on 31 May 2023. On 14 June, goalkeeper Carlos Acevedo withdrew from the squad due to injury and was replaced by José Antonio Rodríguez.

Head coach: (Argentina) Diego Cocca

No.	Pos.	Player	Date of birth (age)	Caps	Goals	Club
1	GK	José Antonio Rodríguez	4 July 1992 (aged 30)	1	0	(Mexican Football Federation) Tijuana
2	DF	Julián Araujo	13 August 2001 (aged 21)	6	0	(Royal Spanish Football Federation) Barcelona B
3	DF	César Montes	24 February 1997 (aged 26)	34	1	(Royal Spanish Football Federation) Espanyol
4	MF	Edson Álvarez	24 October 1997 (aged 25)	61	3	(Royal Dutch Football Association) Ajax
5	DF	Johan Vásquez	22 October 1998 (aged 24)	8	1	(Italian Football Federation) Cremonese
6	DF	Gerardo Arteaga	7 September 1998 (aged 24)	18	1	(Royal Belgian Football Association) Genk
7	MF	Luis Romo	5 June 1995 (aged 28)	29	1	(Mexican Football Federation) Monterrey
8	MF	Carlos Rodríguez	3 January 1997 (aged 26)	42	0	(Mexican Football Federation) Cruz Azul
9	FW	Ozziel Herrera	25 May 2001 (aged 22)	3	0	(Mexican Football Federation) Atlas
10	FW	Alexis Vega	25 November 1997 (aged 25)	26	6	(Mexican Football Federation) Guadalajara
11	FW	Santiago Giménez	18 April 2001 (aged 22)	10	2	(Royal Dutch Football Association) Feyenoord
12	GK	Luis Malagón	2 March 1997 (aged 26)	2	0	(Mexican Football Federation) América
13	GK	Guillermo Ochoa (captain)	13 July 1985 (aged 37)	135	0	(Italian Football Federation) Salernitana
14	FW	Érick Sánchez	27 September 1999 (aged 23)	12	1	(Mexican Football Federation) Pachuca
15	DF	Israel Reyes	23 May 2000 (aged 23)	7	2	(Mexican Football Federation) América
16	MF	Sebastián Córdova	12 June 1997 (aged 26)	14	3	(Mexican Football Federation) UANL
17	MF	Orbelín Pineda	24 March 1996 (aged 27)	52	7	(Hellenic Football Federation) AEK Athens
18	MF	Luis Chávez	15 January 1996 (aged 27)	16	1	(Mexican Football Federation) Pachuca
19	DF	Jorge Sánchez	10 December 1997 (aged 25)	30	1	(Royal Dutch Football Association) Ajax
20	FW	Henry Martín	18 November 1992 (aged 30)	31	7	(Mexican Football Federation) América
21	FW	Uriel Antuna	21 August 1997 (aged 25)	43	10	(Mexican Football Federation) Cruz Azul
22	DF	Víctor Guzmán	7 March 2002 (aged 21)	2	0	(Mexican Football Federation) Monterrey
23	DF	Jesús Gallardo	15 August 1994 (aged 28)	84	1	(Mexican Football Federation) Monterrey
