= Lynden, Ontario =

Community in Hamilton, Ontario, Canada

Coordinates: 43.2296°N 80.1445°W

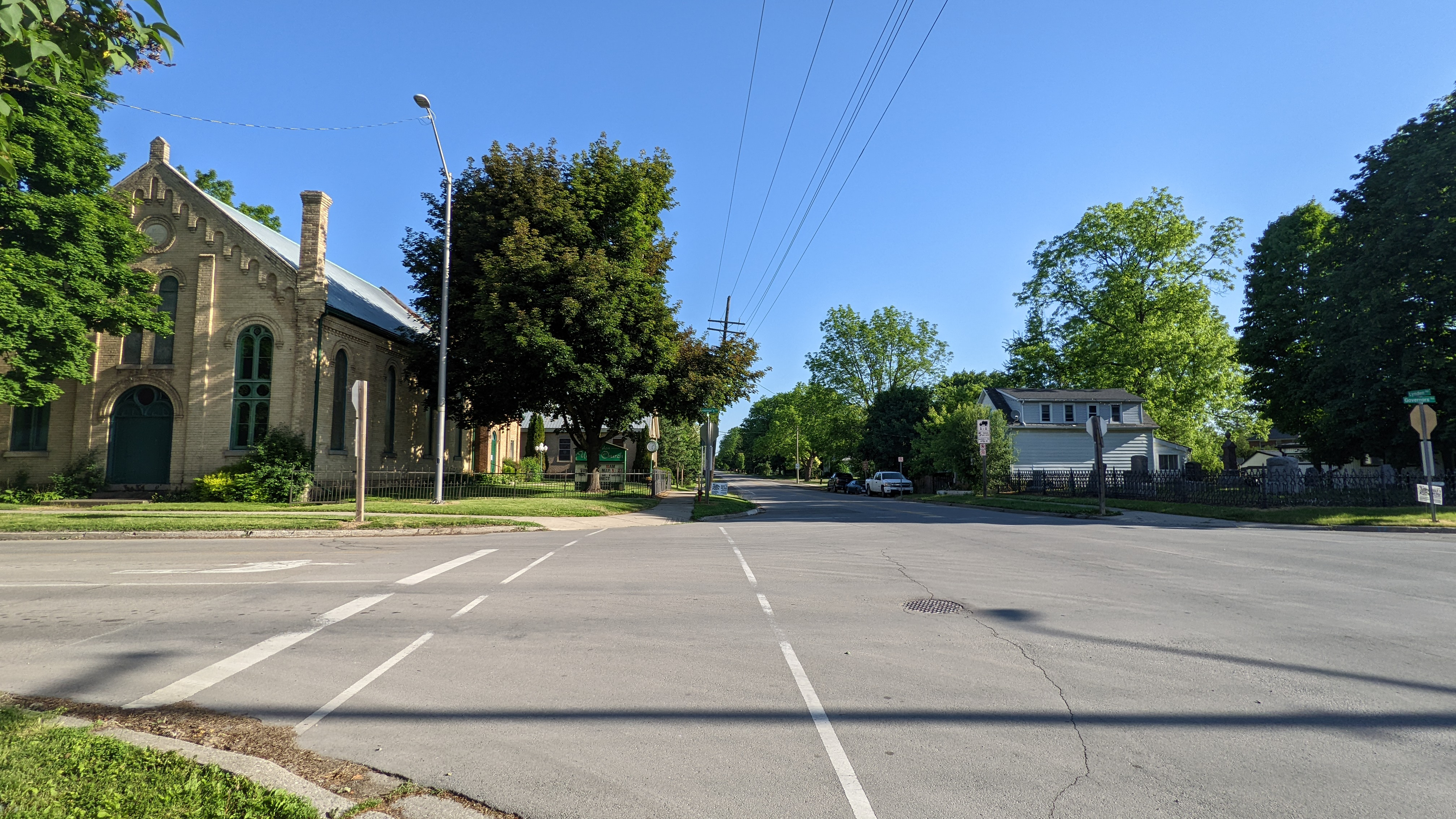
Main Intersection

Lynden is a community within Flamborough, which is itself part of the city of Hamilton, Ontario, Canada.

== History ==
In 1843, the village was originally called VanSickle after local miller Benony VanSickle. In 1853, Jeremiah Bishop renamed the community after Lyndon, Vermont.

== Notable people ==
- Birthplace of NHL Hall of Famer, Red Horner.
- David Forsyth, considered to be the Father of Canadian Soccer was brought to Lynden from Scotland at the age of one in 1853. He attended school in Lynden, then in the Spring of 1865 he entered Dundas High School. Later he went on to attend Galt Collegiate Institute and the University of Toronto. He formed the Western Football (Soccer) Association in Berlin, Ontario in 1880, one of the oldest soccer associations in the world.
- Steve Ihnat, actor and movie director, although born in Czechoslovakia, attended Lynden Public School from the age of 5.

== Local Schools ==
Lynden School (originally Lynden Public and Continuation School, 1924)Rockton elementary school is now the closest one too lynden.
