= David Forsyth (soccer) =

Canadian educator and soccer player (1852–1936)

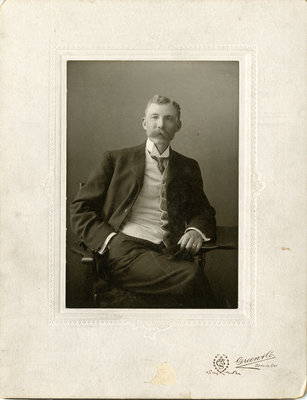
- Forsyth, circa 1900
- Born: December 15, 1852; Perthshire, Scotland, United Kingdom
- Died: September 14, 1936 (aged 83); Beamsville, Ontario, Canada
- Resting place: Kitchener, Ontario, Canada
- Education: University of Toronto, BA in mathematics 1875
- Occupations: Educator; Soccer player and administrator
- Years active: 1876–1921
- Employer: Berlin High School
- Known for: "Father of Canadian Soccer"

David Forsyth (December 15, 1852 – September 14, 1936) was a Canadian educator and soccer player and administrator. A member of the Canadian Soccer Hall of Fame, he is known as the "Father of Canadian Soccer".

== Early and personal life ==
Forsyth was born in Perthshire, Scotland, in 1852. His family emigrated to British North America when he was one year old, settling in the village of Lynden, Canada West. Educated at local schools in Lynden, then Dundas High School and Galt Collegiate Institute, he went on to study mathematics at the University of Toronto, graduating with a silver medal in 1875. He was married to Augusta Mylius from 1882 until her death in 1912.

== Education career ==
After graduating, Forsyth became master of mathematics and science at Berlin High School in Berlin, Ontario, (Note: The city of Berlin was renamed Kitchener in 1916. Berlin High School is now known as Kitchener-Waterloo Collegiate and Vocational School.) where he was the first science teacher in Ontario to introduce practical laboratory work for students. Having acquired an interest in soccer while at university, he was also responsible for popularizing the sport at the school and in the Berlin area generally. He eventually became principal of Berlin High School in 1901. The school became one of the most prominent in Ontario during Forsyth's career there; William Lyon Mackenzie King, a future Prime Minister of Canada, was one of his pupils. He also served on a Royal Commission on Industrial Training and Technical Education.

== Soccer career ==
Forsyth was an influential figure in the early history of soccer in Berlin, which he introduced at Berlin High School in the late 1870s. As the sport spread throughout the local area, the Western Football Association (WFA) was formed in January 1880, with Forsyth as its first secretary-treasurer, a post he held until 1906. He also served as president and honorary president. The Berlin High School team, with Forsyth playing as a forward, won the WFA Challenge Cup four years running from 1880 to 1883. Forsyth was also one of the founders of the Berlin town football club, later known as the Berlin Rangers, which formed around 1884 and won the Challenge Cup in 1885.

Forsyth represented Canada as a player in the country's first (unofficial) soccer international matches. He was a member of the WFA-organized teams that travelled to Newark, New Jersey to play against a United States team in November 1885 and November 1886. In 1888, Forsyth was the organizer of the Canadian team that toured the British Isles, playing against several leading club sides and also playing an unofficial international against a Scotland XI. Forsyth acted as secretary during the tour, and also played in occasional matches. He was also involved in the initial planning of another British tour in 1891, but resigned before it took place.

Forsyth was also a founder member of the Ontario Football Association in 1901, serving as their secretary until 1906. He was president of the WFA from 1915 to 1920, and secretary again from 1921 to 1923. He was later made honorary president of the Dominion of Canada Football Association. (Note: The national governing body of soccer in Canada, now known as the Canadian Soccer Association.)

== Other interests and later life ==
Forsyth was a Kitchener Public Library board member for over 30 years, serving as secretary and chairman. He was a member of the Berlin Board of Health, Waterloo Historical Society, Mathematical Association of Canada, American Association of Science and the National Geographic Society. Amongst his other sporting achievements, he captained the Berlin lacrosse team and was a prominent member of the Berlin Cricket Club, and was also involved in cycling, canoeing, lawn bowling, and curling. A freemason, he was a member of Grand River Lodge No. 151 in Waterloo.

After his retirement from teaching in 1921, Forsyth moved to Beamsville, Ontario, in 1924, where his son Otto lived, and became a fruit farmer. He died in Beamsville in 1936 and was buried at Mount Hope Cemetery in Kitchener.

== Legacy ==
Forsyth was inducted into the Canadian Soccer Hall of Fame in 2000 as one of the builders of the sport in Canada. The Hall of Fame describes him as the "Father of Canadian Soccer".
