= 1888 Great Britain Tour =

The 1888 Great Britain Tour was a series of association football matches played between a touring team from Canada organized by the Western Football Association, and several clubs from across the British Isles. The Canadian team finished their tour with 9 wins, 5 draws, and 9 losses in 60 days. In 2003, the team was inducted into the Canada Soccer Hall of Fame for their accomplishments.

== WFA roster ==
Name	Nation
Harry Bewell	CAN
Harry P. Bingham	CAN
Walter W. Bowman	CAN
Solomon Brubacher	CAN
Dr. William Burnet	CAN
Alexander Noble Garrett	CAN
Alex Gibson	CAN
Tom Gibson	CAN
Dr. Edward Payson Gordon	CAN
Fred Killer	CAN
Charles (Carl) Kranz	CAN
Tom W. Murray	CAN
Dr Wilfred Pirt Mustard	CAN
Dr. Henry Hempton “Harry” Pirie	CAN
Dr. Walter Proudfoot Thomson (c)	CAN
E.W. Webster	CAN
David Forsyth	CAN / SCO

== Results ==
=== Statistics ===
Competition	First match	Last match	Record							
Competition	First match	Last match	Pld	W	D	L	GF	GA	GD	Win %
Irish opponents	1 September	5 September	4	3	1	0	13	7	+6	75.00
Scottish opponents	8 September	18 September	5	1	1	3	5	12	−7	20.00
English opponents	22 September	30 October	14	5	3	6	21	22	−1	35.71
Total			23	9	5	9	39	41	−2	39.13

Last updated: 30 October 1888
Source: Matches

=== Matches ===
All match records were retrieved from research done by Colin Jose.

1 September 1	County Antrim (Ireland)	2–6	WFA team	Belfast, Ireland
	Peden; Gibb		Charles Krantz; Walter Thomson; Alex Gibson

3 September 2	Distillery (Ireland)	2–3	WFA team	Belfast, Ireland

4 September 3	Clarence (Ireland)	2–3	WFA team	Belfast, Ireland

5 September 4	YMCA (Ireland)	1–1	WFA team	Belfast, Ireland

8 September 5	Rangers (Scotland)	1–1	WFA team	Govan, Scotland
	R. Hotson		Walter Tomson	Stadium: Ibrox Park

11 September 6	Queen's Park (Scotland)	3–1	WFA team	Crosshill, Scotland
	?; Andrew; Berry		Alex Gibson	Stadium: Hampden Park

13 September 7	Ayr (Scotland)	4–0	WFA team	Ayr, Scotland
	Ross; Alex Campbell; Cunningham; ?

15 September 8	Hearts (Scotland)	0–3	WFA team	Edinburgh, Scotland
			Walter Thomson; Alex Gibson; Tom Gibson	Stadium: Tynecastle Park

18 September 9	Scotland XI	4–0	WFA team
	McCall; ?; ?
Note: The Scotland XI were not the national team. They were a team made up of Scottish league players from Cowlairs, Queens Park, Rangers, Renton, and Vale of Leven football clubs.

22 September 10	Sunderland (England)	0–3	WFA team
			Tom Gibson; Thomson

26 September 11	Middlesbrough (England)	2–3	WFA team
			Tom Gibson; Thomson

29 September 12	Lincoln City (England)	1–3	WFA team
			Walter Bowman; Thomson

1 October 13	Sheffield (England)	1–1	WFA team
Note: It is unclear which particular Sheffield team played in this match (e.g. Sheffield United, Sheffield Wednesday, etc.).

4 October 14	Notts County (England)	2–0	WFA team	Nottingham, England
				Stadium: Trent Bridge Ground

6 October 15	Newton Heath (England)	0–2	WFA team
			Walter Bowman; E.W. Webster

8 October 16	Blackburn Rovers (England)	4–1	WFA team
			Tom Gibson

13 October 17	Swifts (England)	2–2	WFA team
			E.W. Webster; Walter Bowman

15 October 18	Northampton County (England)	2–3	WFA team	Wellingboro, England
			E.W. Webster; David Forsyth: Harry Bingham

17 October 19	Oxford University (England)	1–1	WFA team
			Charles Kranz

20 October 20	Old Carthusians (England)	1–0	WFA team
	Surgess-Jones

22 October 21	Aston Villa (England)	4–2	WFA team
	?; ?; ?; ?		Henry Pirie; Walter Thomson

27 October 22	West Bromwich Albion (England)	1–0	WFA team
	?

31 October 23	Swifts (England)	1–0	WFA team	London, England
				Stadium: Kennington Oval
