= Bob Bearpark =

Canadian soccer head coach (1943–1996)

Personal information
- Full name: Robert Bearpark
- Date of birth: 15 March 1943
- Place of birth: Berwick-upon-Tweed, England
- Date of death: 18 November 1996 (aged 53)

Robert Bearpark (March 15, 1943 – November 18, 1996) was a Canadian soccer head coach.

Born in Berwick-upon-Tweed, England, Bearpark played soccer as a youth for Bristol City and Bath. He moved to Canada when he was 32 and enrolled as a graduate student in physical education at the University of Western Ontario. He then became assistant professor and soccer coach at McMaster University in Hamilton, Ontario.

Bearpark served three years as technical director for the Ontario Soccer Association and then joined the Canadian Soccer Association, where he coached the national team to a fourth-place finish at the 1984 Great Wall of China Tournament, and led the team in qualifying for the 1984 Summer Olympics. In 1986, he was assistant to Tony Waiters at the 1986 FIFA World Cup in Mexico and coached the national youth team at the FIFA World Youth Championship in the Soviet Union. He became head coach of Canada's national team after the World Cup and held the job through 1987.

In 1989 Bearpark quit his job with the CSA after refusing a transfer from Hamilton to the head office in Ottawa. He moved to British Columbia, where he served six years as director of sports services for the B.C. government. He died in Victoria, British Columbia at the age of 53. Bearpark was inducted into the Canadian Soccer Hall of Fame in 2006.
