= Pierre Barrieu =

French football fitness coach (born 1972)

Personal information
- Full name: Pierre Barrieu
- Date of birth: February 7, 1972 (age 54)
- Place of birth: Thionville, Moselle, France

Managerial career
- Years: Team
- 1999–2002: University of Virginia (Strength and Conditioning Coach)
- 2002–2006: USA National Team (Head Fitness Coach)
- 2007–2008: New York Red Bulls (Head Fitness Coach)
- 2008–2012: USA National Team (Assistant Coach / Head Fitness Coach)
- 2012–2014: United Arab Emirates National Team (Assistant Coach / Head Fitness Coach)
- 2014–2015: Sheffield Wednesday Football Club (Director of Performance)
- 2014–: FIFA (Official Coaching School Instructor)
- 2015–2016: Havre Athletic Club (Director of Performance)
- 2016–2017: Swansea City Football Club (Head Fitness Coach)
- 2017–2020: Los Angeles Galaxy (Director of High Performance)
- 2021–2022: Toronto FC (Director of High Performance)
- 2022–2023: Leeds United (Fitness Coach)
- 2024–: Canada National Team (Assistant Coach, Head of Performance)

Pierre Barrieu (French pronunciation: [pjɛʁ baʁjø]; born February 2, 1972) is a French-American football coach, fitness coach, UEFA and FIFA instructor. He is currently the Director of Performance for the Canada men's national team which he joined from Premier League side Leeds United. He previously worked with the United States national team and United Arab Emirates Football Association.

== Career ==
Barrieu was born in Thionville, France. He graduated from the University of Nancy (France) in 1994 with a degree in sciences and techniques of physical education and sport and a CAPEPS (National Teaching Certificate). He holds a French Football Federation Federal Coaching Diploma (Diplôme d'Entraineur Fédéral) as well as a UEFA "A" Coaching license and a US Soccer Federation Pro A Coaching License. Barrieu is also a certified club coach with the USA Track and Field and USA Olympic Weightlifting Federations .

== University of Virginia ==
Pierre Barrieu began his US coaching career during the 1999–2000 season joining the University of Virginia Men's Program as assistant coach/head fitness coach. In 2001, Barrieu helped guide the University of Virginia men's soccer team to a record of 17-2-1, 6-0-0 in the Atlantic Coast Conference. His strength and conditioning regimen helped propel the University of Virginia to become the first team in Atlantic Coast Conference history to win a regular season championship after winning all of its games by shutout.

== USA National Team ==
His first assignment with the US Soccer Federation was working with the U-18 United States. Barrieu was then named the United States strength and conditioning coach for the 2002 Gold Cup, where the USA won their first Gold Cup in 11 years. Barrieu went on to coach for the United States in the 2002 World Cup . In particular, the fitness of the USA team was widely believed to have been an important factor during the historic run to the quarterfinals in Korea.

On January 1, 2003, Barrieu officially left UVA to join the US Soccer Federation as the Men National Team Head Fitness Coach. The United States followed up the 2002 success by winning its third Gold Cup, and second out of three, in 2005.

In the 2006 World Cup, after finishing top of the CONCACAF qualification tournament, the U.S. was drawn into Group E along with the Czech Republic, Italy, and Ghana. The United States opened its tournament with a 3–0 loss to the Czech Republic. The team then drew 1–1 against Italy, thanks to an own goal from Zaccardo, ending up being the only opponent together along with France the Italian side failed to defeat in the tournament (officially, according to FIFA, France and Italy drew 1–1, although Italy won the tournament after a penalty shoot out). The United States was then knocked out of the tournament when beaten 2–1 by Ghana in its final group match.

During this period, Barrieu also worked with USA U-20 National teams ahead of the 2003 World Championships in the UAE and The 2005 World Championships in the Netherlands.

== New York Red Bulls ==
Bruce Arena, then head coach of Major League Soccer team New York Red Bulls, hired Barrieu for the 2007 season. The Red Bulls made but lost the 1st round of the playoffs.

== Return to USA National Team ==
After one season in New York City, Barrieu rejoined the US Soccer Federation under Head Coach Bob Bradley. During this period, the U.S. team finished to the 2nd place in the 2009 Confederations Cup, including a 2–0 victory over the world's number one ranked team and European champions Spain, ending their 35-game unbeaten streak and 15-game winning streak. With the 2009 CONCACAF Gold Cup and On October 10, sealed its qualification for the 2010 World Cup in South Africa, with a 3–2 away win against Honduras. The USA team went on to top group C, beating Algeria 1-0 and drawing 1–1 with England and 2–2 with Slovenia. The USA team later lost in its first match of the second round to Ghana 2–1, after extra time. Barrieu's last game of his 136 career games on the bench for the USA National Team was the 2011 Concacaf Gold Cup final; played at the Rose Bowl in Pasadena, California on June 25, 2011, with over 93,000 in attendance. The USA team lost the game 2-4 after being up 2–0 on goals by Michael Bradley and Landon Donovan. This final was Mexico's seventh in Gold Cup history, while it was the United States' eighth final, and their fourth consecutive final.

== United Arab Emirates national football team ==
On January 1, 2012, Pierre Barrieu was officially named as the United Arab Emirates (UAE) National Team Assistant Coach and United Arab Emirates Football Association Head Fitness Coach. Barrieu has been the assistant of Head Coach Srečko Katanec. He was then confirmed assistant coach after Katanec's firing and under the caretaker coach Abdulla Mesfer. Barrieu was also an assistant for the Under 19 Team which qualified for the Asian Cup.

== Sheffield Wednesday F.C. ==
Barrieu was an assistant coach under Stuart Gray and the Performance Manager for the championship team; in preparation for the 2014/2015 Season.

== FIFA ==
Barrieu was added to the official FIFA instructors list in 2014. His first coaching assignment was the CONCACAF/FIFA development course that opened October 16, 2014, in Surnrise, Florida. The innovative program is based on a FIFA publication that explores the integration of physical preparation into small-sided games.

== UEFA ==
Barrieu is a member of the UEFA Fitness Advisory Group which supervises the UEFA Fitness Coaching License for its 55 Member Associations.

== Toronto FC ==
On February 22, 2021, Toronto FC announced Barrieu as the Director of High Performance for the club.

== Others ==
During his USA tenure, Barrieu has consulted with many MLS teams, including the New York Red Bulls, Chivas USA, and Columbus Crew.

== Publications ==
He is the co-author of three books ”De l'entrainement à la performance” (From training to performance), 2008, De Boeck edition fr:De Boeck. “Entrainer les jeunes footballeurs” (Training youth football players)”, "Le foot en 7 langues" (Football in seven languages) 2009, De Boeck edition fr:De Boeck.
