= 1975 Vancouver Whitecaps season =

Vancouver Whitecaps 1975 soccer season

Vancouver Whitecaps FC
1975 season
- Owner: Herb Capozzi
- General manager: Denny Veitch
- Head coach: Jim Easton
- NASL: Division: 4th Overall: 9th
- NASL Playoffs: Did not qualify
- Highest home attendance: 10,007 vs Chicago Sting April 18, 1975
- Lowest home attendance: 4,528 vs Denver Dynamos July 31, 1975
- Average home league attendance: 7,579
Home colours	Away colours

The 1975 Vancouver Whitecaps season was the second season of the Whitecaps, and their second season in the North American Soccer League and the top flight of Canadian soccer.

This was coach Jim Easton's last season with the club and the club showed improvement over their inaugural season. The season started brightly with five wins including those over Seattle and Toronto at home. The rest of the season had mixed results, but the Whitecaps well and truly fell out of playoff contention by losing seven of their last ten games. Barring the 3-0 loss away to the Seattle Sounders on July 19, 1975, the games were close one goal losses. In the last two games of the season, the Whitecaps trounced Denver and San Jose 6-0 and 4-0. The Whitecaps finished at 0.500 with eleven wins and losses at fourth in the Pacific Division. Local resident Glen Johnston led the Whitecaps with eight goals and seven assists while Sam Lenarduzzi and Bruce Wilson played all 22 games. Sergio Zanatta and Barrie Mitchell also had strong seasons on the score sheet.

The Whitecaps also played a friendly match against the New York Cosmos and the newly signed Pele on July 7, 1975, with 26,495 in attendance.

== Club ==
=== Roster ===
The 1975 squad

Note: Flags indicate national team as defined under FIFA eligibility rules; some limited exceptions apply. Players may hold more than one non-FIFA nationality.

No.	Pos.	Nation	Player
1	GK	ITA	Peter Greco
1	GK	CAN	Greg Weber
2	DF	CAN	Neil Ellett
3	DF	CAN	Bruce Wilson
4	DF	SCO	Gerry Heaney
5	DF	CAN	Robert Lenarduzzi
6	DF	CAN	Silvano Lenarduzzi
7	DF	ENG	Les Wilson
8	FW	CAN	Glen Johnson
9	FW	CAN	Brian Budd

No.	Pos.	Nation	Player
10	FW	ITA	Sergio Zanatta
11	MF	CAN	Brian Gant
12	DF	CAN	Bruce Twamley
14	FW	CAN	Gary Thompson
15	MF	CAN	Darryl Samson
16	FW	CAN	Bruce Miller
17	DF	SCO	Charlie Palmer
18	MF	SCO	William Stevenson
19	MF	SCO	Barrie Mitchell
—	MF	NED	Robert Alberts
—	DF	ENG	Peter Short

=== Team management ===
Jim Easton was Vancouver Whitecaps coach in 1975 and saw good success during his tenure with a small budget and local players.

== Results ==
=== Results by round ===
Round	1	2	3	4	5	6	7	8	9	10	11	12	13	14	15	16	17	18	19	20	21	22
Ground	H	H	H	A	A	H	A	A	A	H	A	H	H	A	A	A	H	A	A	H	H	H
Result	W	W	W	W	W	L	L	W	L	W	L	W	L	L	L	L	W	L	L	L	W	W

Source: soccerstats.us
A = Away; H = Home; W = Win; L = Loss; T = Tie

=== Match results ===
April 17, 1975 1	Vancouver Whitecaps	1–0	Chicago Sting	Vancouver
	Sergio Zanatta	Report		Stadium: Empire Stadium; Attendance: 10,007

April 26, 1975 2	Vancouver Whitecaps	2–1	Seattle Sounders	Vancouver
	Bruce Wilson; Sergio Zanatta	Report	Tjeert Van't Land	Stadium: Empire Stadium; Attendance: 7,753

May 3, 1975 3	Vancouver Whitecaps	4–1	Toronto Metros-Croatia	Vancouver
	Bob Lenarduzzi; Brian Budd; Glen Johnson; Sergio Zanatta	Report	Bruno Pilas	Stadium: Empire Stadium; Attendance: 7,336

May 9, 1975 4	Los Angeles Aztecs	0–3	Vancouver Whitecaps	Los Angeles
		Report	Sergio Zanatta; Bob Lenarduzzi; Glen Johnson	Stadium: El Camino College; Attendance: 7,155

May 10, 1975 5	San Jose Earthquakes	1–2	Vancouver Whitecaps	San Jose, California
	Paul Child	Report	Barrie Mitchell; Bruce Twamley	Stadium: Spartan Stadium; Attendance: 17,632

May 16, 1975 6	Vancouver Whitecaps	0–2	Portland Timbers	Vancouver
		Report	Barry Powell; Tony Betts	Stadium: Empire Stadium; Attendance: 7,815

May 24, 1975 7	Hartford Bicentennials	1–0	Vancouver Whitecaps	Hartford, Connecticut
		Report	Own goal	Stadium: Yale Bowl; Attendance: 3,210

May 28, 1975 8	New York Cosmos	0–1	Vancouver Whitecaps	New York City
		Report	Own goal	Stadium: Downing Stadium; Attendance: 7,331

June 1, 1975 9	Rochester Lancers	3–1	Vancouver Whitecaps	Rochester, New York
	Tommy Ord; Eli Durante	Report	Brian Budd	Stadium: Holleder Memorial Stadium; Attendance: 4,811

June 5, 1975 10	Vancouver Whitecaps	3–0	San Antonio Thunder	Vancouver
	Glen Johnson; Gary Thompson	Report		Stadium: Empire Stadium; Attendance: 7,514

June 7, 1975 11	Portland Timbers	3–2	Vancouver Whitecaps	Portland, Oregon
	Graham Day; Tony Betts; Brian Godfrey	Report	Brian Gant; Glen Johnson	Stadium: Civic Stadium; Attendance: 11,335

June 11, 1975 12	Vancouver Whitecaps	1–0	Los Angeles Aztecs	Vancouver
	Barrie Mitchell	Report		Stadium: Empire Stadium; Attendance: 9,168

June 19, 1975 13	Vancouver Whitecaps	2–3	San Jose Earthquakes	Vancouver
	Glen Johnson; Barrie Mitchell	Report	Ilija Mitic; Archie Roboostoff	Stadium: Empire Stadium; Attendance: 9,424

June 27, 1975 14	Dallas Tornado	2–1	Vancouver Whitecaps	Dallas
	Kyle Rote Jr. George Ley	Report	Robert Alberts	Stadium: Texas Stadium; Attendance: 3,436

June 29, 1975 15	St. Louis Stars	2–1	Vancouver Whitecaps	St. Louis
	John Hawley	Report	Sergio Zanatta	Stadium: Francis Field (St. Louis County, Missouri); Attendance: 4,217

July 3, 1975 16	Portland Timbers	2–1	Vancouver Whitecaps	Portland, Oregon
	Chris Dangerfield; Tony Betts	Report	Bruce Twamley	Stadium: Civic Stadium; Attendance: 18,278

July 10, 1975 17	Vancouver Whitecaps	2–1	Seattle Sounders	Vancouver
	Glen Johnson; Brian Budd	Report	Paul Crossley	Stadium: Empire Stadium; Attendance: 7,205

July 12, 1975 18	Los Angeles Aztecs	1–0	Vancouver Whitecaps	Los Angeles
	Michael Ferguson	Report		Stadium: El Camino College; Attendance: 7,604

July 19, 1975 19	Seattle Sounders	3–0	Vancouver Whitecaps	Seattle
	Paul Crossley; John Rowlands; Unknown	Report		Stadium: Memorial Stadium; Attendance: 17,925

July 24, 1975 20	Vancouver Whitecaps	1–2	Boston Minutemen	Vancouver
	Sergio Zanatta	Report	Ade Coker; Wolfgang Suhnholz	Stadium: Empire Stadium; Attendance: 7,158

July 31, 1975 21	Vancouver Whitecaps	6–0	Denver Dynamos	Vancouver
	Charlie Palmer; Robert Alberts; Glen Johnson; Bob Lenarduzzi; Les Wilson; Barrie Mitchell	Report		Stadium: Empire Stadium; Attendance: 4,528

August 7, 1975 22	Vancouver Whitecaps	4–0	San Jose Earthquakes	Vancouver
	Own goal Bruce Wilson; Barrie Mitchell; Brian Budd	Report		Stadium: Empire Stadium; Attendance: 5,461

=== Mid-season friendlies ===
July 7, 1975	Vancouver Whitecaps	1–2	New York Cosmos	Vancouver
		Report		Stadium: Empire Stadium; Attendance: 26,495

== See also ==
- History of Vancouver Whitecaps FC
