= 1976 Vancouver Whitecaps season =

Vancouver Whitecaps 1976 soccer season

Vancouver Whitecaps FC
1976 season
- Owner: Herb Capozzi
- General manager: Denny Veitch
- Head coach: Eckhard Krautzun
- NASL: Division: 3rd Overall:109th
- NASL Playoffs: Play-In Round
- Highest home attendance: 11,352 vs Portland Timbers April 16, 1976
- Lowest home attendance: 6,028 vs Denver Dynamos April 30, 1976
- Average home league attendance: 8,655
Home colours	Away colours

The 1976 Vancouver Whitecaps season was the third season of the Whitecaps, and third second season in the North American Soccer League and the top flight of Canadian soccer.

The Whitecaps made a bit of a splash signing English goalkeeper Phil Parkes, who starred with the United Soccer Association's Los Angeles Wolves in 1967 and with Kansas City Spurs in 1969.

The Vancouver Whitecaps also played some European sides on exhibition tours.

In May 1976 the Glasgow Rangers made a tour of the Pacific Northwest NASL clubs. The Vancouver Whitecaps tied them 2-2 on May 18, 1976, in front of 14,000 spectators.

On May 25, 1976, the Vancouver Whitecaps tied Manchester United 0-0.

The Vancouver Whitecaps had a 4-3 victory over Borussia Mönchengladbach on July 27, 1976, in front of 11,533 spectators. This game has been noted as a very entertaining affair that earned Borussia Monchengladbach some Vancouver fans as they played competitively.

== Squad ==
The 1976 squad

Note: Flags indicate national team as defined under FIFA eligibility rules; some limited exceptions apply. Players may hold more than one non-FIFA nationality.

No.	Pos.	Nation	Player
1	GK	(Canada) CAN	Greg Weber
2	MF	(Canada) CAN	Buzz Parsons
3	DF	(Canada) CAN	Bruce Wilson
4	MF	(England) ENG	Tommy Ord
5	DF	(Canada) CAN	Bob Lenarduzzi
6	DF	(Canada) CAN	Sam Lenarduzzi
7	DF	(Canada) CAN	Les Wilson
8	FW	(Canada) CAN	Glen Johnson
9	FW	(Canada) CAN	Brian Budd
10	FW	(Jamaica) JAM	Art Welch
11	MF	(Canada) CAN	Brian Gant
12	MF	(Germany) GER	Horst Köppel
12	FW	(England) ENG	Billy Woof

No.	Pos.	Nation	Player
13	MF	(Scotland) SCO	Tony McAndrew
14	FW	(Denmark) DEN	Uffe Pederson
15	MF	(Canada) CAN	Darryl Samson
16	MF	(Canada) CAN	Brian Robinson
17	FW	(Canada) CAN	Frank Wood
18	FW	(Canada) CAN	Gary Thompson
19	MW	(Scotland) SCO	Barrie Mitchell
19	FW	(England) ENG	Peter Silvester
19	MF	(Germany) GER	Wolfgang Suhnholz
20	DF	(England) ENG	Stephen Hetzke
21	MF	(Netherlands) NED	Robert Alberts
22	G	(England) ENG	Phil Parkes
—	FW	(Denmark) DEN	Neils Kristensen

== Competitions ==
=== Pacific Conference ===
Western Division	W	L	GF	GA	PT
Minnesota Kicks	15	9	54	33	138
Seattle Sounders	14	10	40	31	123
Vancouver Whitecaps	14	10	38	30	120
Portland Timbers	8	16	23	41	71
St. Louis Stars	5	19	29	57	58

Pld = Matches played; W = Matches won; L = Matches lost; GF = Goals for; GA = Goals against; GD = Goal difference; Pts = Points

==== Results by round ====
Round	1	2	3	4	5	6	7	8	9	10	11	12	13	14	15	16	17	18	19	20	21	22	23	24
Ground	H	H	A	A	H	H	A	H	A	A	A	A	H	A	A	H	A	H	A	H	H	A	H	H
Result	T	W	W	L	W	W	L	T	L	W	L	L	W	W	W	L	L	W	L	T	W	W	L	W

Source: soccerstats.us
A = Away; H = Home; W = Win; L = Loss; T = Tie

==== Match results ====
April 16, 1976 1	Vancouver Whitecaps	2 – 2 (SO)	Portland Timbers	Vancouver
	Own Goal; Gary Thompson	Report	Tony Belts; Ike Mackay	Stadium: Empire Stadium; Attendance: 11,352

April 24, 1976 2	Vancouver Whitecaps	3–0	San Diego Jaws	Vancouver
	Billy Woof; Johnson; Tony McAndrew	Report		Stadium: Empire Stadium; Attendance: 7,021

April 30, 1976 3	Vancouver Whitecaps	1–0	St. Louis Stars (soccer)	Vancouver
	Brian Gant; Bob Lenarduzzi	Report	Dennis Vaninger	Stadium: Empire Stadium; Attendance: 6,028

May 2, 1976 4	Seattle Sounders	1-0	Vancouver Whitecaps	Seattle
	Dave Butler	Report		Stadium: Kingdome; Attendance: 24,096

May 7, 1976 5	Vancouver Whitecaps	2–0	Dallas Tornado	Vancouver
	Tony McAndrew; Tommy Ord	Report		Stadium: Empire Stadium; Attendance: 6,171

May 14, 1976 6	Vancouver Whitecaps	2–1	Minnesota Kicks	Vancouver
	Johnson; Tommy Ord	Report	ace Ntsoelengoe	Stadium: Empire Stadium; Attendance: 6,311

May 16, 1976 7	San Jose Earthquakes	2–0	Vancouver Whitecaps	San Jose, California
	George Sorgic	Report		Stadium: Spartan Stadium; Attendance: 17,889

May 21, 1976 8	Vancouver Whitecaps	0 (SO) – 0	Toronto Metros-Croatia	Vancouver
		Report		Stadium: Empire Stadium; Attendance: 8,042

June 5, 1976 9	Washington Diplomats	0 – 0	Vancouver Whitecaps	Washington, D.C.
	Leroy Deleon	Report		Stadium: W.T. Woodson High School; Attendance: 5,203

June 6, 1977 10	Rochester Lancers	1-2	Vancouver Whitecaps	Vancouver
	Mike Stojanovic	Report	Tony McAndrew; Billy Woof	Stadium: Empire Stadium; Attendance: 4,951

June 12, 1976 11	Los Angeles Aztecs	2 – 1	Vancouver Whitecaps	Los Angeles
	George Best; Ron Davies	Report	Billy Woof	Stadium: El Camino College; Attendance: 6,843

June 19, 1976 12	San Antonio Thunder	6 – 1	Vancouver Whitecaps	San Antonio, Texas
	Jose Berico; Eddie Thompson; Dan Counce; Harry Hood	Report	Tommy Ord	Stadium: Alamo Stadium; Attendance: 4,418

June 25, 1976 13	Vancouver Whitecaps	2 – 0	Miami Toros	Vancouver
	Bruce Wilson; Johnson	Report		Stadium: Empire Stadium; Attendance: 10,715

July 3, 1976 14	San Diego Jaws	0 – 1	Vancouver Whitecaps	San Diego
		Report	Billy Woof	Stadium: Aztec Bowl; Attendance: 5,416

July 4, 1976 15	Dallas Tornado	1 – 2	Vancouver Whitecaps	Dallas
	Kevin Kewley	Report	Bob Lenarduzzi; Robert Alberts	Stadium: Ownby Stadium; Attendance: 20,418

July 7, 1976 16	Vancouver Whitecaps	0 – 1	San Jose Earthquakes	Vancouver
		Report	Mirko Liveric	Stadium: Empire Stadium; Attendance: 9,145

July 10, 1976 17	Minnesota Kicks	3-0	Vancouver Whitecaps	Minneapolis
	Ron Futcher; Alan Willey	Report		Stadium: Metropolitan Stadium; Attendance: 21,697

July 15, 1976 18	Vancouver Whitecaps	3–0	San Antonio Thunder	Vancouver
	Tommy Ord; Billy Woof	Report		Stadium: Empire Stadium; Attendance: 9,105

July 18, 1976 19	Portland Timbers	2 – 1	Vancouver Whitecaps	Portland, Oregon
	Neil Rioch; Tony Betts	Report	Tony McAndrew	Stadium: Civic Stadium; Attendance: 17,456

July 23, 1976 20	Vancouver Whitecaps	1 (SO) – 1	Los Angeles Aztecs	Vancouver
	Sam Lenarduzzi	Report	George Sorgic	Stadium: Empire Stadium; Attendance: 10,252

July 30, 1976 21	Vancouver Whitecaps	3–1	Philadelphia Atoms	Vancouver
	Brian Budd; Sam Lenarduzzi; Peter Silvester	Report	Manuel Luna	Stadium: Empire Stadium; Attendance: 12,285

July 31, 1976 22	St. Louis Stars (soccer)	0-5	Vancouver Whitecaps	St. Louis, Missouri
	Ayre; Possee	Report	Joy	Stadium: Francis Field; Attendance: 4,157

August 6, 1976 23	Vancouver Whitecaps	0–1	Connecticut Bicentennials	Vancouver
		Report	Geoff Pike	Stadium: Empire Stadium; Attendance: 9,147

August 13, 1976 24	Vancouver Whitecaps	3-2	Seattle Sounders	Vancouver
	Buzz Parsons; Tony McAndrew	Report	Gordon Wallace; Jimmy Gabriel	Stadium: Empire Stadium; Attendance: 10,533

=== NASL Playoffs ===
August 18, 1976 First round	Seattle Sounders	1-0	Vancouver Whitecaps	Seattle
	Geoff Hurst	Report		Stadium: Kingdome; Attendance: 30,406

=== Mid-season friendlies ===
May 18, 1976	Vancouver Whitecaps (Canada)	2 – 2	(Scotland) Glasgow Rangers F.C.	Vancouver
				Stadium: Empire Stadium; Attendance: 14,000

May 25, 1976	Vancouver Whitecaps (Canada)	0 – 0	(England) Manchester United F.C.	Vancouver
				Stadium: Empire Stadium; Attendance: 14,000

July 27, 1976	Vancouver Whitecaps (Canada)	4 – 3	(Germany) Borussia Mönchengladbach	Vancouver
		Report		Stadium: Empire Stadium; Attendance: 11,533

== See also ==
History of Vancouver Whitecaps FC
