= 1974 Vancouver Whitecaps season =

Vancouver Whitecaps 1974 soccer season

Vancouver Whitecaps FC
1974 season
- Owner: Herb Capozzi
- General manager: Denny Veitch
- Head coach: Jim Easton
- NASL: Division: 5th Overall: 11th
- NASL Playoffs: Did not qualify
- Highest home attendance: 17,343 vs San Jose Earthquakes May 5, 1974
- Lowest home attendance: 6,310 vs Baltimore Comets June 16, 1974
- Average home league attendance: 10,098
Home colours	Away colours

Division 1 professional soccer returned to Vancouver in 1974 with the Vancouver Whitecaps as interest began to grow in U.S. soccer, and the NASL grew after stabilizing in terms of attendance and number of teams with six to eight teams. In 1974 the Whitecaps were one of five expansion teams that were the first teams since 1968 (when Vancouver previously had a team) west of Dallas, Texas and St. Louis, Missouri.

The 1974 Vancouver Whitecaps season was the inaugural season of the Whitecaps and their debut season in the North American Soccer League. The Whitecaps were born on December 11, 1973, with the franchise announcement on the top floor of a downtown Vancouver Davie Street hotel. The city had officially amateur teams with regional leagues going back to the 1930s in the Pacific Coast Soccer League. The city was also home to NASL professional soccer in 1967 and 1968 when the Vancouver Royal Canadians competed at Empire Stadium.

The team played in colours of red and white. Their logo was a standard shield-shaped crest decorated only by a red soccer ball, with a maple leaf in the middle and the words 'Vancouver Whitecaps' above. The Whitecaps hit the pitch on May 5, 1974, with an attendance of 17,343 at Empire Stadium for their first NASL regular season match against the San Jose Earthquakes, losing 2–1 in a shootout.

Jim Easton who had moved from his native Scotland in 1973 to take the 'Caps coaching role after playing the previous season for the Miami Toros, missed the playoffs the first season with a team from the local Vancouver area reinforced with four Scottish players. Locals included players from the University of British Columbia, Pacific Coast Soccer League, and returned local players who had gone abroad to train with European clubs.

== Squad ==
The 1974 squad

Note: Flags indicate national team as defined under FIFA eligibility rules; some limited exceptions apply. Players may hold more than one non-FIFA nationality.

No.	Pos.	Nation	Player
0	GK	BER	Sam Nusum
1	GK	CAN	Greg Weber
2	DF	CAN	Neil Ellett
3	DF	CAN	Bruce Wilson
4	MF	CAN	Doug Scorse
5	DF	CAN	Bob Lenarduzzi
6	DF	CAN	Sam Lenarduzzi
7	FW	ITA	Victor Kodelja
8	FW	CAN	Glen Johnson

No.	Pos.	Nation	Player
9	FW	SCO	George McLean
10	MF	SCO	Billy Stevenson
11	MF	CAN	Brian Gant
12	FW	CAN	Brian Budd
13	FW	ENG	Chris Bennett
14	FW	CAN	Gary Thompson
15	MF	CAN	Darryl Samson
16	DF	SCO	Gerry Heaney
17	DF	SCO	Charlie Palmer
19	DF	ENG	Les Wilson

Midfielder Billy Stevenson and defender Sam Lenarduzzi were captains of the 1974 Vancouver Whitecaps.

== NASL ==
=== League Standings ===
==== Western Division ====
Pos	Club	Pld	W	D	L	GF	GA	GD	Pts
1	Los Angeles Aztecs	20	11	2	7	41	36	+5	110
2	San Jose Earthquakes	20	9	8	3	43	38	+5	103
3	Seattle Sounders	20	10	3	7	37	17	+20	101
4	Vancouver Whitecaps	20	5	4	11	29	30	–1	70

Pld = Matches played; W = Matches won; D = Matches drawn; L = Matches lost; F = Goals for; A = Goals against; GD = Goal difference; Pts = Points
Source: [1]

==== Overall ====
Pos	Club	Pld	W	D	L	GF	GA	GD	Pts
1	Los Angeles Aztecs	20	11	2	7	41	36	+5	110
2	Miami Toros	20	9	6	5	38	24	+14	107
3	Baltimore Comets	20	10	2	8	42	46	–4	105
4	San Jose Earthquakes	20	9	8	3	43	38	+5	103
5	Seattle Sounders	20	10	3	7	37	17	+20	101
6	Dallas Tornado	20	9	3	8	39	27	+12	100
7	Boston Minutemen	20	10	1	9	41	36	+5	94
8	Toronto Metros-Croatia	20	4	12	14	28	40	–12	87
9	Rochester Lancers	20	4	12	14	28	40	–12	77
10	Philadelphia Atoms	20	8	1	11	25	25	0	74
11	Vancouver Whitecaps	20	5	4	11	29	30	–1	70
12	Washington Diplomats	20	7	1	12	29	36	–7	70
13	New York Cosmos	20	4	12	14	28	40	–12	58
14	St. Louis Stars	20	4	1	15	42	54	–12	54
15	Denver Dynamos	20	5	0	15	21	42	–21	49

Pld = Matches played; W = Matches won; D = Matches drawn; L = Matches lost; F = Goals for; A = Goals against; GD = Goal difference; Pts = Points
Source: [1]

=== Results ===
==== Results by round ====
Round	1	2	3	4	5	6	7	8	9	10	11	12	13	14	15	16	17	18	19	20
Ground	H	H	A	A	H	A	A	A	H	H	H	A	A	H	A	H	A	H	H	A
Result	D	W	D	L	W	L	D	D	L	W	D	L	W	D	D	D	L	W	D	L

Source: soccerstats.us
A = Away; H = Home; W = Win; D = Draw; L = Loss

==== Match results ====
May 5, 1974 1	Vancouver Whitecaps	1–1 (a.e.t.)	San Jose Earthquakes	Vancouver, British Columbia
	Niel Ellett	Report	Hernandez	Stadium: Empire Stadium; Attendance: 17,343

May 11, 1974 2	Vancouver Whitecaps	1–0	Denver Dynamos	Vancouver, British Columbia
	Brian Gant	Report		Stadium: Empire Stadium; Attendance: 10,232

May 17, 1974 3	Miami Toros	2–2 (a.e.t.)	Vancouver Whitecaps	Miami, Florida
	George McLean	Report	Derek Watts	Stadium: Miami Orange Bowl; Attendance: 4195

May 19, 1974 4	Toronto Metros	2–1	Vancouver Whitecaps	Toronto, Ontario
	Vojin Lazarevic; Tadeusz Polak	Report	George McLean	Stadium: Varsity Stadium; Attendance: 5,130

May 25, 1974 5	Vancouver Whitecaps	1–0	Boston Minutemen	Vancouver, British Columbia
	Brian Gant	Report		Stadium: Empire Stadium; Attendance: 11,148

May 27, 1974 6	Los Angeles Aztecs	3–0 (a.e.t.)	Vancouver Whitecaps	Los Angeles, California
	Jerry Kazarian; Doug McMillan; Tony Douglas	Report		Stadium: Weingart Stadium; Attendance: 6,248

June 1, 1974 7	Denver Dynamos	0–0 (a.e.t.)	Vancouver Whitecaps	Denver, Colorado
		Report		Stadium: Mile High Stadium; Attendance: 3,325

June 2, 1974 8	Dallas Tornado	1–1 (a.e.t.)	Vancouver Whitecaps	Dallas, Texas
	Rote	Report	Victor Kodelja	Stadium: Texas Stadium; Attendance: 9,286

June 9, 1974 9	Vancouver Whitecaps	0–2	Seattle Sounders (1974–83)	Vancouver, British Columbia
		Report	David Butler; Jimmy Gabriel	Stadium: Empire Stadium; Attendance: 11,258

June 16, 1974 10	Vancouver Whitecaps	4–1	Baltimore Comets	Vancouver, British Columbia
	Brian Gant; Bruce Wilson; Victor Kodelja	Report	Hank Kazmierski	Stadium: Empire Stadium; Attendance: 6,130

June 23, 1974 11	Vancouver Whitecaps	0–0 (a.e.t.)	Philadelphia Atoms	Vancouver, British Columbia
		Report		Stadium: Empire Stadium; Attendance: 8,816

June 29, 1974 12	Washington Diplomats	2–1	Vancouver Whitecaps	Washington DC
	Gary Darrell; George Ross	Report	Chris Bennett	Stadium: Robert F. Kennedy Stadium; Attendance: 3,156

June 30, 1974 13	New York Cosmos	0–2	Vancouver Whitecaps	New York, New York
		Report	Chris Bennett; George McLean	Stadium: Downing Stadium; Attendance: 2,835

July 7, 1974 14	Vancouver Whitecaps	1–1 (a.e.t.)	St. Louis Stars	Vancouver, British Columbia
	Glen Johnson	Report	Dennis Vaninger	Stadium: Empire Stadium; Attendance: 8,142

July 10, 1974 15	St. Louis Stars	1–1 (a.e.t.)	Vancouver Whitecaps	St. Louis, Missouri
	Jim Bokern	Report	Glen Johnson	Stadium: Busch Memorial Stadium; Attendance: 9,990

July 14, 1974 16	Vancouver Whitecaps	2–2 (a.e.t.)	Dallas Tornado	Vancouver, British Columbia
	Brian Gant; Bob Lenarduzzi	Report	Ilija Mitic; Garcia	Stadium: Empire Stadium; Attendance: 11,814

July 26, 1974 17	San Jose Earthquakes	3–1	Vancouver Whitecaps	San Jose, California
	Own goal Paul Child; Archie Roboostoff	Report	George McLean	Stadium: Spartan Stadium; Attendance: 17,670

July 28, 1974 18	Vancouver Whitecaps	3–1	Los Angeles Aztecs	Vancouver, British Columbia
	Brian Budd; Darryl Sampson	Report	Doug McMillan	Stadium: Empire Stadium; Attendance: 8,024

August 4, 1974 19	Vancouver Whitecaps	2–2 (a.e.t.)	Rochester Lancers	Vancouver, British Columbia
	Bob Lenarduzzi; George McLean	Report	Rudi Sacher; David Proctor	Stadium: Empire Stadium; Attendance: 7,892

August 11, 1974 20	Seattle Sounders	2–1	Vancouver Whitecaps	Seattle, Washington
	John Rowlands; Jimmy Gabriel	Report	Charlie Palmer	Stadium: Kingdome; Attendance: 14,876

== See also ==
History of Vancouver Whitecaps FC
