= 1977 Vancouver Whitecaps season =

Vancouver Whitecaps 1977 soccer season

Vancouver Whitecaps FC
1974 season
- Owner: Herb Capozzi
- General manager: John Best
- Head coach: Eckhard Krautzun
- NASL: Division: 2nd Conference: 3rd Overall: 8th
- NASL Playoffs: Play-In Round
- Highest home attendance: 30,277 vs. NY (Jun 30)
- Lowest home attendance: 6,922 vs. CON (Jun 5)
- Average home league attendance: 11,897
Home colours	Away colours

The 1977 Vancouver Whitecaps season was the fourth season of the Whitecaps, and their fourth season in the North American Soccer League, which was at the time, the top flight of American Canadian soccer.

Qualifying for the playoffs for the second-straight season, the Whitecaps were eliminated by their Cascadian rivals, the Seattle Sounders, for the second straight season, in the first round of the postseason. The 'Caps finished second in their division, behind the Minnesota Kicks.

== Background ==
The Vancouver Whitecaps came into their fourth season riding off the most successful season in franchise history. The 1976 squad qualified for the NASL playoffs for the first time, but lost to their Cascadian rivals, Seattle Sounders in the first round of the playoffs. Entering the 1977 season, the club made several defensive upgrades.

== Squad ==
The 1977 squad

Note: Flags indicate national team as defined under FIFA eligibility rules; some limited exceptions apply. Players may hold more than one non-FIFA nationality.

No.	Pos.	Nation	Player
1	GK	ENG	Graham Moseley
2	DF	CAN	Garry Ayre
3	DF	CAN	Bruce Wilson
4	DF	GER	Holgar Osieck
5	DF	CAN	Bob Lenarduzzi
6	DF	ITA	Sam Lenarduzzi
7	MF	CAN	Buzz Parsons
8	FW	CAN	Glen Johnson
9	FW	CAN	Brian Budd
10	MF	CAN	Bob Bolitho

No.	Pos.	Nation	Player
11	DF	CAN	Les Wilson
12	MF	GER	Horst Köppel
12	MF	YUG	Marko Vujkovic
13	MF	CAN	Darryl Samson
14	MF	ENG	Brian Bason
14	DF	ENG	Peter Simpson
15	MF	GER	Peter Stollwerk
16	FW	ENG	Tommy Ord
17	FW	ENG	Tony Funnell
18	DF	CAN	Gary Thompson

== Competitions ==
=== NASL ===
==== Standings ====
Pos	Club	Pld	W	L	GF	GA	GD	Pts
1	Minnesota Kicks	26	16	10	44	36	+8	137
2	Vancouver Whitecaps	26	14	12	43	36	+7	124
3	Seattle Sounders	26	14	12	43	34	+9	123
4	Portland Timbers	26	10	16	39	42	−3	98

Pld = Matches played; W = Matches won; L = Matches lost; GF = Goals for; GA = Goals against; GD = Goal difference; Pts = Points

==== Results by round ====
Round	1	2	3	4	5	6	7	8	9	10	11	12	13	14	15	16	17	18	19	20	21	22	23	24	25	26
Ground	H	H	H	A	A	H	A	A	A	H	H	A	A	H	H	A	H	H	H	A	A	H	A	A	H	A
Result	L	W	W	L	L	W	L	L	L	W	W	W	W	W	L	L	W	W	W	L	L	W	L	W	L	W

Source: soccerstats.us
A = Away; H = Home; W = Win; L = Loss; T = Tie

==== Match results ====
April 8, 1977 1	Vancouver Whitecaps	0–1	Portland Timbers	Vancouver
PT		Report	Scullion	Stadium: Empire Stadium; Attendance: 10,519

April 17, 1977 2	Vancouver Whitecaps	2–0	San Jose Earthquakes	Vancouver
PT	Osieck; Johnson	Report		Stadium: Empire Stadium; Attendance: 7,494

April 24, 1977 3	Vancouver Whitecaps	1–0	Minnesota Kicks	Vancouver
PT	Funnell	Report		Stadium: Empire Stadium; Attendance: 10,147

April 29, 1977 4	Team Hawaii	2–1	Vancouver Whitecaps	Honolulu, Hawaii
PT	Henry; Tinnion	Report	Vujkovic	Stadium: Aloha Stadium; Attendance: 4,124

May 9, 1977 5	San Jose Earthquakes	2–1	Vancouver Whitecaps	San Jose, California
PT		Report		Stadium: Spartan Stadium; Attendance: 15,553

May 15, 1977 6	Vancouver Whitecaps	2–2 (a.e.t.)	Dallas Tornado	Vancouver
PT	Parsons; Ord	Report	Rote, Jr.	Stadium: Empire Stadium; Attendance: 8,471

May 20, 1977 7	Las Vegas Quicksilvers	0–0 (a.e.t.)	Vancouver Whitecaps	Whitney, Nevada
PT		Report		Stadium: Sam Boyd Stadium; Attendance: 5,527

May 22, 1977 8	Los Angeles Aztecs	3–1	Vancouver Whitecaps	University Park, California
PT	David; McAlinden	Report	Bolitho	Stadium: Los Angeles Memorial Coliseum; Attendance: 8,267

May 25, 1977 9	Minnesota Kicks	4–2	Vancouver Whitecaps	Bloomington, Minnesota
PT	Futcher; Willey	Report	Bolitho; Ord	Stadium: Metropolitan Stadium; Attendance: 27,742

May 29, 1977 10	Vancouver Whitecaps	2–1	Fort Lauderdale Strikers	Vancouver
PT	Bason; Vujkovic	Report	Irving	Stadium: Empire Stadium; Attendance: 7,241

June 5, 1977 11	Vancouver Whitecaps	2–1	Connecticut Bicentennials	Vancouver
PT	Osieck; Vujkovic	Report	Moia	Stadium: Empire Stadium; Attendance: 6,922

June 8, 1977 12	St. Louis Stars	1–3	Vancouver Whitecaps	St. Louis, Missouri
PT	Daly	Report	Possee; Parsons	Stadium: Francis Field; Attendance: 5,607

June 11, 1977 13	Tampa Bay Rowdies	1–2	Vancouver Whitecaps	Tampa, Florida
PT	Smethurst	Report	Taylor; Possee	Stadium: Tampa Stadium; Attendance: 15,225

June 14, 1977 14	Vancouver Whitecaps	2–0	Rochester Lancers	Vancouver
PT	Bason; Parsons	Report		Stadium: Empire Stadium; Attendance: 7,872

June 21, 1977 15	Vancouver Whitecaps	0–0 (a.e.t.)	Toronto Blizzard	Vancouver
PT				Stadium: Empire Stadium; Attendance: 9,455

June 24, 1977 16	Chicago Sting	5–2	Vancouver Whitecaps	Chicago
PT	Moore	Report	Ord; Parsons	Stadium: Soldier Field; Attendance: 3,203

June 30, 1977 17	Vancouver Whitecaps	5–3	Cosmos	Vancouver
PT	Possee; Parsons; Funnell	Report	Chinaglia; Roth; Field	Stadium: Empire Stadium; Attendance: 30,277

July 5, 1977 18	Vancouver Whitecaps	1–0	Seattle Sounders	Vancouver
PT	Possee	Report		Stadium: Empire Stadium; Attendance: 14,559

July 11, 1977 19	Vancouver Whitecaps	4–3	Team Hawaii	Vancouver
PT	Parsons; Bolitho; Bason; Possee	Report	Nover; Henry; Counce	Stadium: Empire Stadium; Attendance: 12,473

July 15, 1977 20	Seattle Sounders	3–1	Vancouver Whitecaps	Seattle
PT	Crossley; Gillett; Buttle		Parsons	Stadium: Kingdome; Attendance: 25,023

July 21, 1977 21	Dallas Tornado	3–0	Vancouver Whitecaps	University Park, Texas
PT	Kewley; O'Hare	Report		Stadium: Ownby Stadium; Attendance: 12,929

July 24, 1977 22	Vancouver Whitecaps	2–1	Las Vegas Quicksilvers	Vancouver
PT	Ayre; Possee	Report	Joy	Stadium: Empire Stadium; Attendance: 11,193

July 28, 1977 23	Toronto Blizzard	6–1	Vancouver Whitecaps	Toronto
PT	Tukša; Vabec; Zutelja	Report	Possee	Stadium: Varsity Stadium; Attendance: 8,276

July 30, 1977 24	Washington Diplomats	0–3	Vancouver Whitecaps	Washington, D.C.
PT		Report	Possee; Parsons	Stadium: RFK Stadium; Attendance: 17,225

August 4, 1977 25	Vancouver Whitecaps	0–2	Los Angeles Aztecs	Vancouver
PT		Report	Rys; Best	Stadium: Empire Stadium; Attendance: 18,037

August 7, 1977 26	Portland Timbers	0–2	Vancouver Whitecaps	Portland, Oregon
PT		Report	Possee; Own goal	Stadium: Civic Stadium; Attendance: 11,094

=== NASL Playoffs ===
August 10, 1977 First round	Vancouver Whitecaps	0–2	Seattle Sounders	Vancouver
PT		Report	Tommy Ord; Mel Machin	Stadium: Empire Stadium; Attendance: 21,915

=== Mid-season friendlies ===
June 22, 1977	Vancouver Whitecaps	1–2	Roma	Vancouver
PT		Report		Stadium: Empire Stadium

== Transfers ==
=== Loan in ===
No.	Pos.	Player	Loaned From	Start	End	Source
12	MF	(Germany) Horst Köppel	(Germany) Mönchengladbach	April 1977	October 1977	

== See also ==
- 1977 in American soccer
- 1977 in Canadian soccer
- History of Vancouver Whitecaps FC
- Vancouver Whitecaps (1974–1984)
- Vancouver Whitecaps (1986–2010)
- Vancouver Whitecaps FC
