= History of Vancouver Whitecaps FC =

History of Canadian soccer team

The history of Vancouver Whitecaps FC, a professional soccer team based in Vancouver, Canada, spans over four decades. The first team to use the "Whitecaps" name was the Vancouver Whitecaps of the now-defunct North American Soccer League, playing from 1974 to 1984. After two years while the core of the players were focused on preparations for the 1986 World Cup, a second version of the club was founded in 1986 as the Vancouver 86ers. This team bought back the Whitecaps name in 2000 and has operated continuously in various leagues since 1986. A Whitecaps FC team began play in Major League Soccer starting in 2011 making it the first time since 1984 that a "Whitecaps" team played in the top tier of soccer in the United States and Canada.

== NASL (1974–1984) ==
The original Vancouver Whitecaps were founded on December 11, 1973 and during the 1970s and 1980s played in the North American Soccer League (NASL). The founding investors in the club were: Herb Capozzi, president; Denny Veitch, general manager; C. N. "Chunky" Woodward owner of Woodwards Department Stores; Chuck Wills, lawyer; Wendy McDonald, president of B.C. Bearing Engineers; Pat McCleary and Harry Moll, proprietors of Charlie Brown Steak House.

The Whitecaps achieved success, winning the 1979 Soccer Bowl coached by Tony Waiters. The Whitecaps of that era included international players such as Alan Ball, but also "home grown" stars like Bruce Wilson, Bobby and Sam Lenarduzzi, Buzz Parsons, and Glen Johnson. In 1979 the team from the "Village of Vancouver" (a reference to ABC TV sportscaster Jim McKay's observation that "Vancouver must be like the deserted village right now", with so many people watching the game on TV) beat the powerhouse New York Cosmos in one of the most thrilling playoff series in NASL history to advance to the Soccer Bowl. In the Soccer Bowl, they triumphed against the Tampa Bay Rowdies in a disappointed New York City.

It was during this short period that soccer interest peaked in Vancouver. The Whitecaps attendance at Empire Stadium grew to regular sellouts, at 32,000. The team also recorded two tracks, with "White is the Colour" becoming a hit on local radio during the run-up to their championship win.

After playing at Vancouver's 32,000-seat Empire Stadium for most of their existence, the team moved into the brand new 60,000-seat BC Place Stadium in 1983. The Whitecaps set a then highest all-time Canadian attendance record of 60,342 spectators for a professional soccer game, on June 20, 1983, Vancouver Whitecaps FC – Seattle Sounders at BC Place. However, the subsequent demise of the NASL in 1984 meant the Whitecaps – along with the other teams in the NASL – were forced to fold.

== CSL (1985–1992) ==
Several of the players from the NASL Vancouver Whitecaps were members of the Canadian Men's National Team preparing for the 1986 World Cup in training camps held in Vancouver. They played exhibition games against teams in the Western Soccer Alliance Challenge Series in 1985. Several are listed on the 1986 FIFA World Cup squads lists as playing for the MISL's Tacoma Stars for the indoor season and played with the Canadian National Men's Team for the outdoor summer season.

The Vancouver 86ers Soccer Club started operations in November 1985 by the community-owned West Coast Soccer Society. Tony Waiters, Les Wilson and Dave Fryatt were the first franchise holders granted the rights for Vancouver on July 26, 1986. The Vancouver 86ers were so named because of the year of the team's founding-1986, the 86 principals underwriting the club, and to commemorate the year the city of Vancouver was founded (1886). There were a lot of ties between the Whitecaps and the 86ers such as Tony Waiters (shareholder), Buzz Parsons (manager 1987–88), Bob Lenarduzzi (coach 1987–1993), Carl Valentine, Jim Easton, David Norman, Dale Mitchell. In newspaper reports the Whitecaps were often referred to as the previous version of the CSL's Vancouver 86ers. Several attempts were made to purchase the Whitecaps name; however, the name was not for sale or the owner wanted too much money for the cash strapped community-owned club.

The Vancouver 86ers played its first game in 1987 in the Canadian Soccer League against Edmonton. The 86ers played in the Canadian Soccer League (CSL) winning four straight CSL Championships (1988–1991) and five consecutive CSL regular-season first-place finishes (1988–92). Vancouver played in the CSL from its inception in 1987 until the league folded in 1992, and then moved over to the APSL in 1993 which was later absorbed into the USL hierarchy of leagues in 1997 becoming the A-League, later renamed the USL-1.

In 1988–1989, the team, coached by Bob Lenarduzzi, set a North American professional sports record by playing 46 consecutive games without a loss. The record began after the June 1988 match the 86ers lost 3–1 away to the North York Rockets. Vancouver then won 37 matches and tied nine others before falling 2–1 away to the Edmonton Brickmen in August 1989. In 2004 the BC Sports Hall of Fame inducted the 1989 soccer team. Also in 1988 the Vancouver 86ers and Calgary Kickers played six friendly matches each against the Western Soccer Alliance in the month of May.

In 1990, the Vancouver 86ers captured the North American Club Championship after defeating the Maryland Bays 3–2 in the final played in Burnaby. The game was played between the champions of the Canadian Soccer League and the champions of the American Professional Soccer League (APSL). The Vancouver 86ers withdrew from the 1992 CONCACAF Champions' Cup prior to the opening Group 2 first round match due to financial constraints. The 86ers also came up short in the first round of the 1992 ‘Professional Cup’ North American Club Championship where they faced APSL champions Colorado Foxes over two legs.

== APSL / A-League / USL-1 (1993–2010) ==
In 1999 Vancouver's player-coach who was one of North American soccer's last active participants in the NASL, Carl Valentine, retired.

With whole hearted support from the fans the new owner, David Stadnyk, bought the name Whitecaps from former NASL Whitecaps director John Laxton. October 26, 2000 the Vancouver 86ers formally changed their name back to the Whitecaps.

In the 2001 season, the team began to use the old Vancouver Whitecaps moniker. The club adopted a similar crest to that of the NASL team featuring a wave. A white cap is a nautical term for a wind wave, not a surf wave. White caps are indicative of force 3 or higher wind and a wave height greater than three feet (0.91 m). For smaller boat craft, the appearance of white caps are a sign of rising wind and danger often necessitating a return to harbour. With the re-branding process of the MLS franchise, the club crest was expanded to include the white caps of snow-covered mountains and include all of the province of BC.

In 2003, the name was again changed, albeit only slightly, to Whitecaps FC, which encompasses the men's, women's, and youth development teams within the organization. At this time, the Whitecaps logo changed slightly in colour (the light teal-green was replaced with a brighter blue) and the word Vancouver was dropped from the image.

In 2006, the Whitecaps organization won an unprecedented double-championship, claiming both the USL-1 championship trophy, defeating the host Rochester Rhinos 3–0 at PAETEC Park, and winning the W-League women's championship. The men's team also won the Nation's Cup, a new tournament established by their club as a way to feature the Whitecaps playing against international competition. The 2006 Nation's Cup tournament featured the Chinese and Indian U-20 national teams and Championship Welsh club Cardiff City F.C. (the "Bluebirds"). They also gradually added the "Vancouver" back into their name, changing it officially to "Vancouver Whitecaps FC".

The following season, the Whitecaps signed a deal to play an exhibition match against the Los Angeles Galaxy, which featured international David Beckham, and promoted director of soccer operations Bob Lenarduzzi to team president. USL-1 teams, especially those in the US competing in the Lamar Hunt U.S. Open Cup, were beginning to see with marketing that MLS teams could be a larger draw as MLS's quality of play increased and the league gained a greater profile.

October 12, 2008, they claimed their second United Soccer Leagues First Division championship with a 2–1 victory over the Puerto Rico Islanders. Charles Gbeke scored twice with his head in the second half to help secure the title. In 2009, they placed seventh in the league and were eliminated in the final by the Montreal Impact on a 6–3 aggregate.

== MLS (2011–present) ==
On March 18, 2009, MLS Commissioner Don Garber announced that Vancouver would be the seventeenth franchise of Major League Soccer. It joined the Portland Timbers, announced two days later as the eighteenth MLS franchise, for the 2011 MLS season. While no name was provided at the Vancouver announcement, over a year later the club confirmed that the MLS team would keep the Whitecaps name.

In preparation for its inaugural season, the Whitecaps brought in executive talent from around the world. On November 24, 2009, Paul Barber, former Tottenham Hotspur F.C. executive, was announced to join the club as CEO. Others joining him include former D.C. United head coach Tom Soehn as Director of Operations and Dutch national Richard Grootscholten as the technical director and head coach of the residency program. Former Iceland international Teitur Thordarson was confirmed as head coach on September 2, 2010 for the inaugural MLS season. He held the same position with the USL-1 and later USSF Division 2 Whitecaps. He was subsequently relieved of his duties on May 30, 2011, after the Whitecaps won just one of their first twelve matches. Tom Soehn, the Whitecaps director of soccer operations, replaced Thordarson on an interim basis.

The Whitecaps began play in the 2011 MLS season with their first match on March 19, 2011, against rival Canadians Toronto FC, which they won 4–2. The first goal in the Whitecaps' MLS era was scored by Eric Hassli. After their winning start the Whitecaps struggled, and failed to secure another victory in their next 11 MLS games, drawing six and losing five. In the aftermath of their 1–1 draw with the New York Red Bulls on May 30 head coach Teitur Thordarson was fired. Tom Soehn took over coaching duties for the remainder of the 2011 season, while Martin Rennie was announced as the new permanent head coach on August 9, taking over officially on November 2. The team managed to attract 15,500 season ticket holders in its first MLS season and 13,000 for the second.

On March 3, 2012, the Whitecaps won their first minor, pre-season cup at the 2012 Walt Disney World Pro Soccer Classic defeating Toronto FC 1–0 thanks to a goal by Camilo Sanvezzo. The Whitecaps finished the regular season with 11 wins, 3 losses, and 10 ties positioning the club, fifth in the Western Conference and 11th on the league overall table. On October 21, 2012, the Whitecaps became the first Canadian team to earn a spot in the MLS playoffs. Vancouver were eliminated in the knockout round.

In the 2013 season, Vancouver finished in seventh in the Western Conference, 13th in the league table with 13 wins, 12 losses, and 9 ties in the regular season. They were not able to qualify for the post season, in the playoffs as they had accomplished in the season prior. Two days after the end of the 2013 MLS regular season, Rennie's contract was not renewed sparking a search for the next head coach. In their off-season, the Whitecaps were in the midst of controversy with one of their then players, Camilo, who had played for the team since their inaugural campaign, after the Brazilian went on to join Liga MX club Querétaro. The Mexican club believed that he was no longer under contract, while the Whitecaps reported that he was still on a contract with Vancouver. The scandal was resolved with the Liga MX club paying a transfer fee from Vancouver to acquire the Brazilian forward.

In October 2014, the Whitecaps qualified for the 2015–16 CONCACAF Champions League for the very first time as a result of becoming the highest ranked Canadian team in the 2014 MLS season and due to a reformatting of the Canadian Championship in the following season. A week later they qualified for the MLS playoffs for the second time, an achievement unmatched by any Canadian team.

In 2015, the Whitecaps would go on to have their best-ever regular season, finishing the season with 53 points. They also went on to win the Canadian Championship for the first time, defeating Montreal 2-0 in the second leg to win the final 4-2 on aggregate. In the 2014-15 CONCACAF Champions League and 2015 MLS Cup Playoffs, however, they did not achieve the same success, getting eliminated in the group stage of the CONCACAF Champions League and the conference semi-final of the playoffs.

2016 saw the Whitecaps take a step back, finishing the regular season with 39 points. In the 2016 Canadian Championship, they reached the final, but lost 2-2 on away goals to Toronto FC. They did go on to win the Cascadia Cup on the final day of the regular season, beating the Portland Timbers 4-1.

2017 saw major improvement for the Whitecaps, as they made the CONCACAF Champions League semi-finals for the first time, but were eliminated by Tigres UANL. They finished the regular season with 52 points, making the playoffs for the fourth time in their history. However, despite recording their first-ever playoff win against the San Jose Earthquakes in the knockout round, they were eliminated by Seattle Sounders FC in the conference semi-final.

In 2018, the Whitecaps would record the fourth-worst defensive record of the season, conceding 67 goals. As a result of poor form in the regular season, coach Carl Robinson was relieved of his duties on September 25, 2018. He was replaced by interim Craig Dalrymple for the remainder of the regular season. The Whitecaps finished the season with 47 points and would miss the playoffs for the second time in three seasons.

2019 saw a new-look squad for the Whitecaps, as key players like Alphonso Davies, Kendall Waston, Kei Kamara, and Cristian Techera had all departed following the 2018 season. They would once again go on to miss the playoffs, finishing the season last place in the Western Conference. They were also eliminated by Cavalry FC in the 2019 Canadian Championship, becoming the first MLS team to get eliminated by a Canadian Premier League side in Canadian Championship history.

2020 was the club's 10th season in Major League Soccer. However, on March 12, 2020, after only two games played, Major League Soccer suspended their season as a result of the COVID-19 pandemic. The Whitecaps' season resumed on July 15, 2020, when they played the San Jose Earthquakes in their first match of the MLS is Back Tournament. Despite losses to the San Jose Earthquakes and Seattle Sounders FC, a 2-0 win against the Chicago Fire was enough for the team to qualify to the round of 16. However, the Whitecaps would ultimately lose to Sporting Kansas City 3-1 on penalties after a scoreless 120 minutes. From August 18 to September 16, 2020, the Whitecaps would play six matches against fellow Canadian MLS teams Toronto FC and Montreal Impact, that would serve as both regular season matches as well as qualifiers for the 2020 Canadian Championship. The Whitecaps would not qualify for the Canadian Championship, finishing at the bottom of the qualification table with only 6 points from 6 games. From September 19, 2020 until the end of the season, the Whitecaps would play the rest of their home matches at Providence Park in Portland, Oregon. They would finish the season with 27 points from 23 matches played, missing the playoffs for the third season in a row.

2021 saw much greater success for the Whitecaps. The season did not start off well initially, with head coach Marc Dos Santos being relieved of his duties on August 27, 2021 as a result of his team sitting below the playoff line after 20 games, as well as once again getting eliminated by Pacific FC in the 2021 Canadian Championship. However, under interim head coach Vanni Sartini, the team would go unbeaten in 12 of their last 14 games to finish the season, making the playoffs for the first time in four years. In the playoffs, the Whitecaps were eliminated in the first round by Sporting Kansas City, losing by a scoreline of 3-1. On November 30, 2021, Vanni Sartini was named as the club's new head coach.

In 2022, the Whitecaps would go on to have mixed success. They missed the playoffs for the fourth time in five years, finishing the season with 43 points. However, they won the 2022 Canadian Championship, beating Toronto FC 5-3 on penalties after a 1-1 draw following regulation and extra time. It was the first time that the Whitecaps won the Canadian Championship since their first victory in 2015. The Canadian Championship victory also meant that the Whitecaps would qualify for the 2023 CONCACAF Champions League.

In the 2023 CONCACAF Champions League, the Whitecaps defeated Real C.D. España to advance to the quarterfinals, but were ultimately eliminated by Los Angeles FC. In the regular season, the team would finish with 48 points, qualifying for the playoffs. They were once again eliminated by Los Angeles FC. In 2023 Leagues Cup, their inaugural appearance in the competition, the Whitecaps advanced to the Round of 32, but were eliminated by Tigres UANL. For the second consecutive season, the Whitecaps won the Canadian Championship for the third time, beating CF Montréal 2-1 in the final. As a result, they qualified for the 2024 CONCACAF Champions Cup.

The 2024 CONCACAF Champions Cup saw the Whitecaps face Tigres UANL, a team that the Whitecaps previously lost to 4-1 on aggregate in the 2016-17 edition. The Whitecaps would once again get eliminated by the Liga MX side, by the same 4-1 aggregate scoreline. In the regular season, the team finished with 47 points, qualifying for the wild-card round of the playoffs where they defeated the Portland Timbers in their wild-card match 5-0. In a Round 1 rematch with Los Angeles FC, the Whitecaps were again eliminated, this time in three games. In the 2024 Leagues Cup, the Whitecaps advanced to the Round of 32 before being eliminated by Pumas UNAM. The Whitecaps won their third consecutive Canadian Championship, winning the 2024 Canadian Championship by defeating Toronto FC 4-2 on penalties after a scoreless draw, qualifying them for the 2025 CONCACAF Champions Cup.

The Whitecaps began the 2025 CONCACAF Champions Cup with a 3-2 aggregate win over Costa Rican side Saprissa. In the Round of 16, they met CF Monterrey led by Sergio Ramos and advanced on away goals (3-3 agg.). They also defeated their quarterfinals opponent UNAM by virtue of away goals (3-3 agg.), after a late stoppage-time equalizer by Tristan Blackmon. Facing the MLS Supporters Shield holders Inter Miami CF, a star-studded side led by Lionel Messi, The Whitecaps upset Miami by winning 5-1 on aggregate, advancing to their first-ever Champions Cup final. The Whitecaps traveled to Mexico City and lost 5-0 to Cruz Azul in the match. In the 2025 Canadian Championship, the Whitecaps defeated CPL side Vancouver FC 4-2 to win their fourth consecutive Canadian Championship.

The club had their most successful regular season to date in the MLS-era. On August 6, 2025, the Whitecaps gained international attention due to the signing of German superstar and 2014 FIFA World Cup winner Thomas Müller in free agency after a storied 17-season club career at Bayern Munich, being a key centrepiece towards the team's multiple trophies. Boosted by the addition of Müller, the Whitecaps went on a ten-game unbeaten streak in all competitions, ending with a 1-2 loss to FC Dallas at home in the final regular season match of the season. The Whitecaps finished the 2025 regular season with a MLS-era record 63 points, maintaining a top-3 position in the Western Conference during the entire season. After sweeping FC Dallas in Round 1 of the 2025 MLS Cup playoffs, the Whitecaps hosted a memorable conference semifinals match versus Los Angeles FC, who eliminated Vancouver from the playoffs the previous two years. With an MLS-era record 53,957 fans in attendance, the Whitecaps defeated LAFC in penalties despite Vancouver playing two men short for the final 11 minutes of stoppage time following a red card to Tristan Blackmon and an injury to Belal Halbouni. The Whitecaps won their first Western Conference title, defeating expansion club San Diego FC in the conference finals to advance to their first MLS Cup, where they lost to Inter Miami 1-3.

== Uniform evolution ==
=== NASL era (1974–1984) ===
- Home

1974–75	1976	1977	1978	1979–84

- Away

1974–75	1976	1977	1978	1979–84

=== CSL 86ers era (1986–1992) ===
1987 Home	1987 Away	1988 Home	1991 Home	1991 Away

=== APSL/A–League 86ers era (1993–2000) ===
1993–94 Home	1993–94 Away	1996 Home	1997 Home

=== A–League/USL–1 Whitecaps era (2001–2010) ===
2001–02 Home	2003 Home	2004–06 Home

=== MLS era (2011–present) ===
Home, away, and third kits.

- Home

2011–12	2013–14	2015–16	2017–18	2019–20	2021–22	2023–24	2025–

- Away

2011–13	2014–15	2016–17	2018–19	2020–21	2022–23	2024–25	2026–

- Third

2012–2013	2025	2026

== Season results ==
=== Key ===
Key to competitions

- Major League Soccer (MLS) – The top-flight of soccer in the United States, established in 1996.
- USSF Division 2 Professional League (D2 Pro) – The second division of soccer in the United States for a single season in 2010, now defunct.
- USL First Division (USL-1) – The second division of soccer in the United States from 2005 through 2009.
- A-League – The second division of soccer in the United States from 1995 through 2004, now defunct.
- American Professional Soccer League (APSL) – The second division of soccer in the United States from 1990 through 1996, now defunct.
- Canadian Soccer League (CSL) – The top-flight of soccer in Canada from 1987 through 1992, now defunct.
- North American Soccer League (NASL) – The top-flight of soccer in the United States from 1968 through 1984, now defunct.
- Canadian Championship (CC) – The premier knockout cup competition in Canadian soccer, first contested in 2008. The Voyageurs Cup (VC), founded in 2002, preceded the competition and now serves as the championship trophy for the current cup tournament.
- CONCACAF Champions Cup (CCC) – The premier competition in North American soccer since 1962. It went by the name of Champions League from 2008 to 2023.

Key to colours and symbols

1st or W	Winners
2nd or RU	Runners-up
SF or 4th	Semi-finalist
Last	Wooden Spoon
♦	League Golden Boot
	Highest average attendance

Key to league record

- Season = The year and article of the season
- Div = Level on pyramid
- League = League name
- Pld = Played
- W = Games won
- L = Games lost
- D = Games drawn
- GF = Goals scored
- GA = Goals against
- Pts = Points
- PPG = Points per game
- Conf = Conference position
- Overall = League position

Key to cup record

- DNE = Did not enter
- DNQ = Did not qualify
- NH = Competition not held or canceled
- QR = Qualifying round
- PR = Preliminary round
- GS = Group stage
- R1 = First round
- R2 = Second round
- R3 = Third round
- R4 = Fourth round
- R5 = Fifth round
- QF = Quarterfinals
- SF = Semifinals
- RU = Runners-up
- W = Winners

=== Seasons ===
Season	League											Position		Playoffs	CC	Continental / Other		Average attendance	Top goalscorer(s)	
Season	Div	League	Pld	W	L	D	GF	GA	GD	Pts	PPG	Conf.	Overall	Playoffs	CC	Continental / Other		Average attendance	Name	Goals
1974	1	NASL	20	5	11	4	29	31	–2	19	0.95	4th	12th	DNQ	–	Ineligible		10,098	(Canada) Brian Gant	6
1975	1	NASL	22	11	11	0	38	28	+10	33	1.50	4th	11th	DNQ	–	Ineligible		7,579	(Canada) Glen Johnson	8
1976	1	NASL	24	14	10	0	38	30	+8	42	1.75	4th	9th	R1	–	Ineligible		8,655	3 players tied	5
1977	1	NASL	26	14	12	0	43	36	+7	42	1.62	4th	7th	R1	–	Ineligible		11,897	(England) Derek Possee	11
1978	1	NASL	30	24	6	0	68	29	+39	72	2.40	2nd	2nd	QF	–	Ineligible		15,736	(England) Kevin Hector	21
1979	1	NASL	30	20	10	0	54	34	+20	60	2.00	3rd	4th	W	–	Ineligible		22,962	(England) Kevin Hector	15
1980	1	NASL	32	16	16	0	52	47	+5	48	1.50	7th	14th	R1	–	Ineligible		26,834	(England) Trevor Whymark	15
1981	1	NASL	32	21	11	0	74	43	+31	63	1.97	1st	3rd	R1	–	Ineligible		23,236	(Canada) Carl Valentine	10
1982	1	NASL	32	20	12	0	58	48	+10	60	1.88	3rd	5th	QF	–	Ineligible		18,254	(England) Ray Hankin	11
1983	1	NASL	30	24	6	0	63	34	+29	72	2.40	1st	2nd	QF	–	Ineligible		29,166	(England) David Cross	19
1984	1	NASL	24	13	11	0	51	48	+3	39	1.63	2nd	4th	SF	–	Ineligible		15,190	(England) Peter Ward	16
1985	No club existed																			
1986	No club existed																			
1987	1	CSL	20	9	8	3	37	27	+10	30	1.50	2nd	4th	SF	–	Ineligible		5,993	(Canada) Domenic Mobilio	12
1988	1	CSL	28	21	1	6	84	30	+54	69	2.46	1st	1st	W	–	Western Soccer Alliance	3–3 (Note: Vancouver played a match against each WSA team in the 1988 season. These matches did count towards the league standings for their opponents, however, Vancouver itself was not included in the league standings, and did not achieve any position. Vancouver finished with a record of 3 wins and 3 losses against WSA opponents.)	4,919	(Canada) John Catliff (Canada) Domenic Mobilio	22
1989	1	CSL	26	18	2	6	65	33	+32	60	2.31	1st	1st	W	–	Ineligible		4,572	(Canada) Domenic Mobilio	12
1990	1	CSL	26	17	6	3	69	26	+43	54	2.08	1st	1st	W	–	North American Club Championship	W	4,218	(Canada) John Catliff	19
1991	1	CSL	28	20	4	4	69	31	+38	64	2.29	N/A	1st	W	–	Ineligible		6,347	(Canada) Domenic Mobilio	26
1992	1	CSL	20	11	6	3	42	28	+14	36	1.80	N/A	1st	RU	–	CONCACAF Champions' Cup	R1 (Note: Despite qualifying, Vancouver withdrew from the tournament before playing in any match.)	4,344	(Canada) John Catliff (Canada) Dale Mitchell	6
1992	1	CSL	20	11	6	3	42	28	+14	36	1.80	N/A	1st	RU	–	Professional Cup	R1	4,344	(Canada) John Catliff (Canada) Dale Mitchell	6
1993	2	APSL	24	15	9	0	43	35	+8	45	1.88	N/A	1st	SF	–	Ineligible		4,866	(Canada) Domenic Mobilio	11
1994	2	APSL	20	7	13	0	25	41	–16	21	1.05	N/A	6th	DNQ	–	Ineligible		4,742	(Canada) Domenic Mobilio	7
1995	2	A-League	24	10	14	0	43	43	0	30	1.25	N/A	3rd	SF	–	Ineligible		4,493	(Canada) Giuliano Oliviero	9
1996	2	A-League	27	13	14	0	38	38	0	39	1.44	N/A	5th	DNQ	–	Ineligible		4,068	(Canada) Domenic Mobilio	14
1997	2	A-League	28	16	12	0	50	29	+21	48	1.71	3rd	6th	SF	–	Ineligible		3,558	(Canada) Domenic Mobilio	22
1998	2	A-League	28	15	13	0	55	42	+13	45	1.61	4th	15th	R1	–	Ineligible		4,185	(Canada) Jason Jordan	8
1999	2	A-League	28	19	9	0	77	31	+46	57	2.04	3rd	4th	R1	–	Ineligible		4,559	(Canada) Niall Thompson	20
2000	2	A-League	28	14	11	3	62	41	+21	45	1.61	5th	9th	QF	–	Ineligible		3,959	(England) Darren Tilley	12
2001	2	A-League	26	16	8	2	44	33	+11	50	1.92	1st	4th	SF	–	Ineligible		5,542	(Canada) Jason Jordan	9
2002	2	A-League	28	11	12	5	41	39	+2	38	1.36	5th	10th	SF	–	Ineligible		3,769	(Canada) Jason Jordan	9
2003	2	A-League	28	15	6	7	45	24	+21	52	1.86	4th	5th	QF	–	Ineligible		4,292	(Canada) Ollie Heald (Canada) Jason Jordan	9
2004	2	A-League	28	14	9	5	38	29	+9	47	1.68	2nd	6th	SF	–	Ineligible		4,833	(Canada) Jason Jordan	7
2005	2	USL-1	28	12	7	9	37	21	+16	45	1.61	N/A	3rd	QF	–	Ineligible		5,086	(Canada) Jason Jordan	17
2006	2	USL-1	28	12	6	10	40	28	+12	46	1.64	N/A	4th	W	–	Ineligible		5,085	(United States) Joey Gjertsen	12
2007	2	USL-1	28	9	7	12	27	24	+3	39	1.39	N/A	7th	QF	–	Ineligible		5,162	(Cuba) Eduardo Sebrango	7
2008	2	USL-1	30	15	7	8	34	28	+6	53	1.77	N/A	2nd	W	3rd	DNQ		4,999	(Cuba) Eduardo Sebrango	16
2009	2	USL-1	30	11	10	9	42	36	+6	42	1.40	N/A	7th	RU	RU	DNQ		5,312	(Canada) Charles Gbeke	13
2010	2	D2 Pro	30	10	5	15	32	22	+10	45	1.50	2nd	5th	SF	RU	DNQ		5,152	(Canada) Martin Nash	5
2011	1	MLS	34	6	18	10	35	55	–20	28	0.82	9th	18th	DNQ	RU	DNQ		20,412	(Brazil) Camilo Sanvezzo	13
2012	1	MLS	34	11	13	10	35	41	–6	43	1.26	5th	11th	R1	RU	DNQ		19,475	(Jamaica) Darren Mattocks	8
2013	1	MLS	34	13	12	9	53	45	+8	48	1.41	7th	13th	DNQ	RU	DNQ		20,038	(Brazil) Camilo Sanvezzo	25
2014	1	MLS	34	12	8	14	42	40	+2	50	1.47	5th	9th	R1	SF	DNQ		20,408	(Chile) Pedro Morales	9
2015	1	MLS	34	16	13	5	45	36	+9	53	1.56	2nd	3rd	QF	W	CONCACAF Champions League	GS	20,507	(Uruguay) Octavio Rivero	10
2016	1	MLS	34	10	15	9	45	52	–7	39	1.15	8th	16th	DNQ	RU	CONCACAF Champions League	SF	22,330	(Chile) Pedro Morales	9
2017	1	MLS	34	15	12	7	50	49	+1	52	1.53	3rd	8th	QF	SF	NH		21,416	(Colombia) Fredy Montero	15
2018	1	MLS	34	13	13	8	54	67	–13	47	1.38	8th	14th	DNQ	RU	DNQ		21,946	(Sierra Leone) Kei Kamara	17
2019	1	MLS	34	8	16	10	37	59	–22	34	1.00	12th	23rd	DNQ	R3	DNQ		19,514	(Colombia) Fredy Montero	8
2020	1	MLS	23	9	14	0	27	44	–17	27	1.17	9th	17th	DNQ	DNQ	MLS is Back Tournament	R1	22,120 (Note: Does not include home matches played in American stadiums, or matches played behind closed doors.)	(Canada) Lucas Cavallini	6
2021	1	MLS	34	12	9	13	45	45	0	49	1.44	6th	12th	R1	R1	DNQ		12,492 (Note: Does not include home matches played in American stadiums.)	(Colombia) Cristian Dájome (United States) Brian White	12
2022	1	MLS	34	12	15	7	40	57	–17	43	1.26	9th	17th	DNQ	W	DNQ		18,643	(Canada) Lucas Cavallini	9
2023	1	MLS	34	12	10	12	55	48	+7	48	1.41	6th	13th	R1	W	CONCACAF Champions League	QF	16,745	(United States) Brian White	19
2023	1	MLS	34	12	10	12	55	48	+7	48	1.41	6th	13th	R1	W	Leagues Cup	Ro32	16,745	(United States) Brian White	19
2024	1	MLS	34	13	13	8	52	49	+3	47	1.38	8th	14th	R1	W	CONCACAF Champions Cup	R1	26,121	(United States) Brian White	15
2024	1	MLS	34	13	13	8	52	49	+3	47	1.38	8th	14th	R1	W	Leagues Cup	Ro32	26,121	(United States) Brian White	15
2025	1	MLS	34	18	7	9	66	38	+28	63	1.85	2nd	5th	RU	W	CONCACAF Champions Cup	RU	21,806	(United States) Brian White	16
Total	–	–	1440	692	503	245	2388	1892	+496	2321	1.61	—		—	—	—		–	(Canada) Domenic Mobilio	167

1. Avg. attendance include statistics from league matches only.
2. Top goalscorer(s) includes all goals scored in League, MLS Cup, Canadian Championship, CONCACAF Champions League, FIFA Club World Cup, and other competitive continental matches.
3. Points and PPG have been adjusted from non-traditional to traditional scoring systems for seasons prior to 2003 to more effectively compare historical team performance across seasons.

== Honours ==
=== Domestic (I) ===
Full-domestic titles
Honour type	Competition	No. of titles	Years won	Years runner-up
League championship	(United States) NASL Championship	1	1979	—
League championship	(Canada) CSL Championship	4	1988, 1989, 1990, 1991	1992
League championship	(United States) MLS Cup	0	—	2025
Regular season title	(United States) MLS Supporters' Shield	0	—	2026
Domestic cup	(Canada) Canadian Championship	5	2015, 2022, 2023, 2024, 2025	2009, 2010, 2011, 2012, 2013, 2016, 2018

Total: 10 major domestic honours

Sub-domestic titles
Honour type	Competition	No. of titles	Years won	Years runner-up
Conference championship	(United States) NASL National Conference	1	1979	—
Conference championship	(Canada) CSL West Division	3	1988, 1989, 1990	—
Conference championship	(United States) MLS Western Conference	1	2025	—
Division championship	(United States) NASL West Division	1	1983	1977, 1984
Division championship	(United States) NASL West Division (NC)	2	1978, 1979	—
Division championship	(United States) NASL Northwest Division	1	1981	—

=== Domestic (II) ===
Honour type	Honour	No. of titles	Years won	Years runner-up
League championship	(United States) APSL/A–League Championship	0	—	—
League championship	(United States) USL A–League Championship	0	—	—
League championship	(United States) USL–1 Championship	2	2006, 2008	2009
Regular season title	(United States) USL Commissioner's Cup	0	—	2008

Total: 2 minor domestic honours

=== International ===
Competition type	Competition	No. of titles	Years won	Years runner-up
Confederation championship	CONCACAF Champions Cup	0	—	2025

Total: 0 International honours

=== Other ===
Cascadia Cup

- Winner (9): 2004, 2005, 2008, 2013, 2014, 2016, 2023, 2025, 2026

== Rivalries ==
The Whitecaps have two sets of rivalries being a Canadian team playing in American leagues as well as having geography and historical leagues contribute to Pacific Northwest rivalries.

=== Cascadia ===
Historically since the earliest days of soccer in the late 1890s BC-based teams have played at tournaments, festivals, and had exhibitions to determine the best team in the Pacific Northwest. Before the railways established links eastward, travel was south via steamship to San Francisco and then to the outside world. Even afterward until at least 1910 BC commonly looked south instead of east. Leagues such as the Pacific Coast Soccer League and most other popular sports played teams from Seattle, Portland, and even San Francisco occasionally. Even afterward there were competitions oriented north–south that top teams such as the Westminster Royals competed in. In the original NASL, the Vancouver Royals had links to the San Francisco Golden Gate Gales.

In 1974 when the Vancouver Whitecaps and Seattle Sounders joined the NASL, it is safe to assume fans were already used to travelling between the two cities to watch sporting events. There are fond reminisces about 3000–5000 Whitecaps fans drowning out Sounders fans at the Kingdome during the NASL era. There were links between staff and players between the Timbers, Sounders, and Whitecaps. Former teammates such as Alan Hinton or Brian Gant played for the nearest rivals. Even off the field there are similar stories; the Vancouver play-by-play radio broadcaster got the job at the last minute after the former Seattle Sounder broadcaster skipped out on Vancouver to take the job in Portland.

The Whitecaps won a title, while the Sounders were runners up twice, and Timbers runners up once. The three teams ended each other's seasons five times in the eleven years the Whitecaps played in the league. The Whitecaps first two playoff appearances were both 1–0 losses to the Seattle Sounders in 1976 and 1977. In 1978 the Whitecaps would lose to the Portland Timbers in the playoff semi-finals.

The three clubs played exhibition matches after the NASL folded in the Western Soccer Alliance and in 1994 the Seattle Sounders and Whitecaps (as the 86ers) were both in the A-League (1995–2004). The Portland Timbers joined the A League in 2001. They eliminated each other in the playoffs five times in the A League. From 2005 – 2009, the league was named USL-1 or USL First Division. The Whitecaps and Sounders were the two most dominant teams in USL-1 with two championships each. The three teams eliminated each other in the USL-1 playoffs four times. In all the years of division 2 soccer since 1996, the Whitecaps have been the dominant team with 1.55 points per game while the Sounders earned 1.54, and Timbers 1.47 points per game. The Sounders have 4 championships to the Whitecaps 2.

The supporters groups of the teams created the Cascadia Cup in 2004. As of 2013, each team has won the cup three times each over the nine years of the cup's existence.

=== Canadian teams ===
The Toronto Blizzard (original NASL) were runners-up twice and Toronto Metros-Croatia won the Soccer Bowl. Vancouver Whitecaps' first playoff win was against the Toronto Metros-Croatia August 9, 1978 in front of 30,811 at Empire Stadium (at the time the largest crowd to see two Canadian teams play against each other). The Toronto Metros-Croatia team felt the goalkeeper was interfered with on the second goal and planned to protest the result even having lost 4–0. The Toronto Blizzard gained revenge by eliminating Vancouver in the 1983 NASL Quarterfinals when Vancouver had a dominant season finishing second overall in the league and most significantly Vancouver was host to Soccer Bowl '83.

Division 2 Toronto-based teams have generally not been as strong as Montreal and Vancouver. Generally Vancouver Whitecaps teams have dominated Toronto-based teams, especially in the CSL and US-based D2 leagues. When Montreal and Vancouver were in the USSF Division 2 and USL-1 playing Toronto FC in the Voyageurs Cup, the rivalry had greater meaning for Vancouver as it was the chance to prove themselves in a meaningful game against competition that was higher level only by fiat.

The rivalry against Montreal is another matter. In the original Canadian Soccer League (1987–92) with the 86ers head coach, Bob Lenarduzzi, taking on the Canadian Men's National Team management, many of the players for the Montreal Supra took umbrage at not being called up for the national team and there was a "real hatred" between the players. Most of those players joined the debuting Montreal Impact of the APSL when the CSL folded. Former players remember trips such as one in 1996 when fire alarms were pulled at 2 am and training facilities were not made available when promised, plus other antics. Montreal Impact also won the first seven Voyageurs Cup competitions.

Significant matches between the two clubs include several league playoffs and Voyageurs Cups. During the late 2000s both clubs were strong and with two new additional matches against each other through the Canadian Championship familiarity brought discord. Several players moved between the two teams for financial reasons such as Eduardo Sebrango and red cards became common occurrences. In the 2006 USL-1 playoff semifinals the Whitecaps outplayed the Impact in the first leg at Vancouver's Swanguard Stadium, however both legs including the second hosted by Montreal finished 0–0. After extra-time, the Whitecaps defeated the Impact 2–0. The Whitecaps and Impact also faced-off in the USL-1 playoff finals in 2008 and 2009. While the Impact won the first leg hosted in Montreal 1–0, they lost the 2008 semifinal after the Whitecaps won the second leg at Swangard 2–0. The most controversial game between the two clubs was in 2009.

==== 2009 Montreal controversy ====
On June 18, 2009 the Impact fielded a weak squad in their Canadian Championship game against Toronto FC, since they were no longer in contention for the cup. They lost the game 6–1, allowing TFC to win the cup over Vancouver on goal difference. Coach Marc Dos Santos was resting key players for the league match against Vancouver two days later. This result was used to convince the Canadian Soccer Association to change the Canadian Championship format. Two days later Montreal Impact won their USL-1 league game against Vancouver 2–1. The Montreal Ultras protested against the Impact's management's unsportsmanlike behaviour by boycotting first half. In the final standings the extra three points Montreal got against Vancouver was the difference between 5th and 7th place, giving the Montreal Impact home advantage over the Whitecaps in the final, playing the second of the two leg playoff at home. Montreal Impact won the league playoff final's second leg 3–1 at home, and won the USL-1 Championship 6–3 on aggregate. The Whitecaps had players sent off in both legs.

== List of players ==
=== All-time rosters ===
- All-time Vancouver Whitecaps roster (2003–2010)
- List of Vancouver Whitecaps FC players (2011–)

=== Captains ===
Name	Nationality	Years	Ref.
Willie Stevenson	SCO	1974	
Sam Lenarduzzi	CAN	1974–1975	
Bruce Wilson	CAN	1976–1977	
Jon Sammels	ENG	1978	
John Craven	ENG	1979–1980	
Alan Ball, Jr.	ENG	1980	
Terry Yorath	WAL	1981–1982	
Peter Lorimer	SCO	1983	
Bob Lenarduzzi	CAN	1984	
Shaun Lowther	CAN	1987	
John Catliff	CAN	1988–1993	
Ivor Evans	Fiji	1994	
Rick Celebrini	CAN	1994–1995	
Steve MacDonald	CAN	1996–1998	
Paul Dailly	CAN	1999–2000	
Kevin Holness	CAN	2001	
Paul Dailly	CAN	2002–2003	
Alfredo Valente	CAN	2004	
Jeff Clarke	CAN	2005–2008	
Adrian Cann	CAN	2008	
Martin Nash	CAN	2008–2010	
Jay DeMerit	USA	2011–2014	
Pedro Morales	CHI	2014–2016	
David Ousted	DEN	2016–2017	
Kendall Waston	CRC	2017–2018	
Jon Erice	ESP	2019	
Russell Teibert	CAN	2020–2023	
Ryan Gauld	SCO	2024–present	

^{†} DeMerit was injured in the 2013 season-opening match and only played in eight games. Various players have filled-in as captain match-by-match.

=== All-time goal scorers ===
As of March 14, 2014

Rank	Player	Nationality	Goals
1	Domenic Mobilio	CAN	170
2	John Catliff	CAN	79
3	Jason Jordan	CAN	78
4	Carl Valentine	CAN	65
5	Dale Mitchell	CAN	49
6	Ivor Evans	Fiji	47
7	Eduardo Sebrango	Cuba	45
8	Camilo Sanvezzo	Brazil	43
9	Kevin Hector	ENG	40
10	Oliver Heald	CAN	39
11	Steve Kindel	CAN	36
12	Alfredo Valente	CAN	35
13	Bob Lenarduzzi	CAN	34
13	Doug Muirhead	CAN	34
15	Ray Hankin	ENG	33
16	Martin Nash	CAN	31
17	John Sulentic	CAN	30
18	Peter Beardsley	ENG	29
18	Paul Dailly	CAN	29
18	Trevor Whymark	ENG	29
21	Niall Thompson	CAN	27

Note: NASL, CSL, APSL, A-League, USL-1, USSF D-2, and MLS
(Regular Season, Playoffs, North American Club Championship, and Canadian Championship)

=== All-time appearances ===
As of March 14, 2014

Rank	Player	Nationality	Appearances
1	Carl Valentine	CAN	409
2	Bob Lenarduzzi	CAN	362
3	Steve Macdonald	CAN	320
4	Steve Kindel	CAN	287
5	Domenic Mobilio	CAN	286
6	Martin Nash	CAN	285
7	Alfredo Valente	CAN	271
8	Jason Jordan	CAN	257
9	Doug Muirhead	CAN	233
10	Paul Dolan	CAN	223
11	Ivor Evans	Fiji	221
12	Jeff Clarke	CAN	202
13	Chris Franks	CAN	201
14	David Morris	USA	200
15	Geordie Lyall	CAN	193
16	Paul Dailly	CAN	187
17	Oliver Heald	CAN	186
18	David Norman	CAN	171
19	John Catliff	CAN	147
20	Doug McKinty	CAN	137
21	Jeff Skinner	CAN	128
22	Jay Nolly	USA	126
23	Dale Mitchell	CAN	121
24	Guido Titotto	CAN	118
25	John Sulentic	CAN	115
26	Nico Berg	CAN	112
26	Jamie Lowery	CAN	112
27	Nick Dasovic	CAN	106
28	Jim Easton Jr.	CAN	102
28	Camilo Sanvezzo	BRA	102
30	Shaun Lowther	CAN	99
30	Gershon Koffie	GHA	99

Note: NASL, CSL, APSL, A-League, USL-1, USSF D-2, and MLS
(Regular Season, Playoffs, North American Club Championship, and Canadian Championship)

== Head coaches ==
NASL

Name	Nationality	Years	Ref.
Jim Easton	CAN	1974–1975	
Eckhard Krautzun	GER	1976–1977	
Holger Osieck	GER	1977	
Tony Waiters	ENG	1977–1979, 1980	
Bob McNab	ENG	1980	
Johnny Giles	IRE	1981–1983	
Alan Hinton	ENG	1984	

CSL / APSL / A-League / USL-1 / USSF-D2

Name	Nationality	Years	Ref.
Bob Lenarduzzi	CAN	1987–1993	
Carl Valentine	ENG	1994–1999	
Dale Mitchell	CAN	2000–2001	
Tony Fonesca	CAN	2002–2004	
Bob Lilley	USA	2005–2007	
Teitur Thordarson	ISL	2008–2010	

MLS team

Name	Nationality	Years	Ref.
Teitur Thordarson	ISL	2011	
Tom Soehn	USA	2011	
Martin Rennie	SCO	2012–2013	
Carl Robinson	WAL	2014–2018	
Marc Dos Santos	CAN	2019–2021	
Vanni Sartini	ITA	2021–2024	
Jesper Sørensen	DEN	2025–present	

== Vancouver Whitecaps Ring of Honour ==
The Vancouver Whitecaps Ring of Honour was established for the club's 40th anniversary to acknowledge the accomplishments of several notable Whitecaps players and coaches. Players and coaches from any of the three Vancouver Whitecaps iterations, as well as the women's Vancouver Whitecaps FC are eligible to be inducted. As of 2025, the club has inducted 5 people to the Ring of Honour.

Ring of Honour inductees
Member	Nationality	Position	Years with club	Date of induction	Ref.
Bob Lenarduzzi	CAN	Player	1974–1984, 1987–1988	May 3, 2014	
Bob Lenarduzzi	CAN	Coach	1987–1993	May 3, 2014	
Andrea Neil	CAN	Player	2001–2006	August 10, 2014	
Carl Valentine	CAN (Note: Born in England. Became a Canadian citizen in 1983.)	Player	1979–1984, 1987–1999	September 10, 2014	
Carl Valentine	CAN	Coach	1994–1999	September 10, 2014	
Domenic Mobilio	CAN	Player	1987–2000	October 4, 2014 †	
Tony Waiters	ENG	Coach	1977–1979	May 31, 2019 †	

† – Inducted posthumously
