= 1977 in American soccer =

Soccer in the United States
- Season: 1977

The 1977 season was the 65th season of competitive soccer in the United States.

== National teams ==
=== Men ===
==== Senior ====
Wins	Losses	Draws
4	3	2

September 15 Friendly	El Salvador	1 – 2	United States	San Salvador, El Salvador

September 18 Friendly	Guatemala	3 – 1	United States	Guatemala City, Guatemala

September 22 Friendly	El Salvador	0 – 1	United States	San Salvador, El Salvador

September 25 Friendly	Guatemala	2 – 0	United States	Guatemala City, Guatemala

September 27 Friendly	Mexico	3 – 0	United States	Monterrey, Mexico
				Stadium: Estadio Tecnológico

September 30 Friendly	United States	0 – 0	El Salvador	United States

October 6 Friendly	United States	1 – 1	China	United States

October 10 Friendly	United States	1 – 0	China	United States

October 16 Friendly	United States	2 – 1	China	United States

== League standings ==
=== North American Soccer League (Div. 1) ===
==== Atlantic Conference ====
Northern Division

	W	L	GF	GA	PT
Toronto Metros-Croatia	13	13	42	38	115
St. Louis Stars	12	14	33	35	104
Rochester Lancers	11	15	34	41	99
Chicago Sting	10	16	31	43	88
Connecticut Bicentennials	7	19	34	65	72

Eastern Division

	W	L	GF	GA	PT
Fort Lauderdale Strikers	19	7	49	29	161
Cosmos	15	11	60	39	140
Tampa Bay Rowdies	14	12	55	45	131
Washington Diplomats	10	16	32	49	92

==== Pacific Conference ====
Western Division

	W	L	GF	GA	PT
Minnesota Kicks	16	10	44	36	137
Vancouver Whitecaps	14	12	43	36	124
Seattle Sounders	14	12	43	34	123
Portland Timbers	10	16	39	42	98

Southern Division

	W	L	GF	GA	PT
Dallas Tornado	18	8	56	37	161
Los Angeles Aztecs	15	11	65	44	147
San Jose Earthquakes	14	12	37	44	119
Team Hawaii	11	15	45	59	106
Las Vegas Quicksilvers	11	15	38	44	103

Playoffs

First Round
Cosmos	3
Tampa Bay Rowdies	0
St. Louis Stars	0(2)
Rochester Lancers	1(4)
Los Angeles Aztecs	2
San Jose Earthquakes	1
Vancouver Whitecaps	0
Seattle Sounders	2

Division Championships
Fort Lauderdale Strikers	3	2(0)
Cosmos	8	3(3)
Toronto Metros-Croatia	0(2)	0
Rochester Lancers	1(3)	1
Dallas Tornado	1	1
Los Angeles Aztecs	3	5
Minnesota Kicks	1	0
Seattle Sounders	2	1

Conference Championships
Cosmos	2	4
Rochester Lancers	1	1
Los Angeles Aztecs	1	0
Seattle Sounders	3	1

Soccer Bowl '77
Cosmos	2
Seattle Sounders	1
