= Tony McAndrew =

Scottish footballer

Personal information
- Date of birth: 11 April 1956 (age 70)
- Place of birth: Glasgow, Scotland
- Position: Defender

Youth career
- –: Middlesbrough

Senior career*
Years	Team	Apps	(Gls)
1973–1982	Middlesbrough	247	(13)
1976	→ Vancouver Whitecaps (loan)	21	(5)
1982–1984	Chelsea	20	(4)
1984–1986	Middlesbrough	66	(2)
- Willington
1988–1989	Darlington	11	(0)
1989	Hartlepool United	4	(0)
- Willington
1993	Billingham Synthonia	4	(0)
- * Club domestic league appearances and goals

Anthony McAndrew (born 11 April 1956) is a Scottish former footballer who played as a defender in the Football League for Middlesbrough, Chelsea, Darlington and Hartlepool United, and in the North American Soccer League for the Vancouver Whitecaps. He was the academy manager at Aston Villa from 1999 to 2015, having previously been part of Brian Little's coaching staff at the club.

== Career ==
A tough-tackling centre half, McAndrew began his career at Middlesbrough in 1973, where he established himself at the heart of defence. Later becoming captain – and the club's youngest scorer of a hat-trick when playing as an emergency striker – he was at Ayresome Park for almost ten years, before leaving for Chelsea when Middlesbrough were relegated from the First Division in 1982. He also spent a summer in the North American Soccer League playing for the Vancouver Whitecaps.

McAndrew was signed for Chelsea on the eve of the 1982–83 season, by Chelsea manager John Neal who had managed him at Middlesbrough. A solid midfield player and defender, his early spell at Chelsea was marred by injuries. He captained Chelsea for a while during the 1983–84 season. He returned to Middlesbrough in October 1984, as part of the deal that brought Darren Wood from Middlesbrough to Chelsea.

He returned to Middlesbrough in 1984, and played for the club for a further two years, before being released in the summer of 1986 as they almost went out of business. After brief spells at Darlington, Hartlepool United, and in non-league football with Willington and Billingham Synthonia, McAndrew joined the coaching staff at Darlington under manager Brian Little. He worked alongside Little at Leicester City, Aston Villa, and Stoke City, before returning to Aston Villa in 1999 as a youth coach. He led Villa's youth team to victory in the FA Youth Cup in 2002.
