= Peter Greco =

Canadian soccer player (born 1946)

Personal information
- Date of birth: 19 July 1946 (age 80)
- Place of birth: Priverno, Italy
- Height: 1.89 m (6 ft 2 1/2 in)
- Position: Goalkeeper

Youth career
- Montréal Y.C.A.P.

Senior career*
Years	Team	Apps	(Gls)
1965–1967	US Superga St-Viateur		
1967–1968	Burnaby Villa		
1968–1972	Vancouver Columbus FC		
1970	Vancouver Spartans		
1972	Richmond Ramparts		
1975	Vancouver Whitecaps	8	(0)
1975–1982	Vancouver Columbus FC		

International career
1967–1974	Canada Amateur	16	(0)
1968	Canada "A"	3	(0)
- * Club domestic league appearances and goals

Peter Greco (born 19 July 1946) is a former soccer player who played as a goalkeeper. He was a three-time national champion with Vancouver Columbus FC (1969, 1977, 1978). Born in Italy, he was Canada's starting goalkeeper during FIFA World Cup Qualifiers in 1968, the Pan American Games in 1967 and 1971, and Olympic Qualifiers in 1971.

He made 19 career international appearances with Canada (at the time a record), including three international "A" appearances in 1968.

Early in his club career, he was named the most valuable player of the 1966 Québec National League season.

== Personal life ==
Born in Italy, Greco is of American descent through his mother.
