= Sergio Zanatta =

Canadian soccer player

Personal information
- Date of birth: 8 August 1946 (age 80)
- Place of birth: Italy
- Position: Striker

Senior career*
Years	Team	Apps	(Gls)
- Vancouver Columbus
1975	Vancouver Whitecaps	16	(6)

International career
1967–1971	Canada U23	10	(3)
1968	Canada	3	(1)
- * Club domestic league appearances and goals

Sergio Zanatta (born 8 August 1946) is a Canadian former soccer player who earned three caps for the Canadian national side in 1968. He played club football for Vancouver Columbus and Vancouver Whitecaps.
