= Brian Bason =

English footballer (born 1955)

Personal information
- Date of birth: 3 September 1955 (age 71)
- Place of birth: Epsom, England
- Height: 5 ft 9 in (1.75 m)
- Position: Midfielder

Youth career
- Chelsea

Senior career*
Years	Team	Apps	(Gls)
1972–1977	Chelsea	19	(1)
1977	Vancouver Whitecaps	19	(3)
1977–1981	Plymouth Argyle	130	(10)
1981–1982	Crystal Palace	27	(0)
1981–1982	→ Portsmouth (loan)	9	(0)
1982–1983	Reading	41	(0)
Total		245	(14)

International career
1970–1971	England Schoolboys	15	(2)
- * Club domestic league appearances and goals

Brian Bason (born 3 September 1955) is an English retired footballer who played as a midfielder.

He attended Thomas Bennett School (now Thomas Bennett Community College) in Crawley in West Sussex and played for England Schoolboys as a left-back. He later played for a number of clubs in the Football League, including Chelsea and Plymouth Argyle.

A goal he scored for Chelsea against Carlisle United was judged the sixth best goal of 1976.

After retirement Bason was known to have been living in Truro, Cornwall where he ran a hotel/public house.
