= Barrie Mitchell =

Scottish footballer (1947–2021)

Personal information
- Full name: Barrie Horace Mitchell
- Date of birth: 15 March 1947
- Place of birth: Aberdeen, Scotland
- Date of death: 24 January 2021 (aged 73)
- Position: Forward

Youth career
- Sunnybank
- 1966–1967: Arbroath

Senior career*
Years	Team	Apps	(Gls)
1967–1972	Dunfermline Athletic	141	(32)
1972–1973	Aberdeen	13	(1)
1973–1976	Tranmere Rovers	83	(10)
1976	Vancouver Whitecaps	26	(5)
1976–1977	Preston North End	11	(2)
1977–1978	York City	3	(0)
1978	Greenock Morton	3	(0)
1978	Wigan Athletic	10	(0)
Total		280	(50)
- * Club domestic league appearances and goals

Barrie Horace Mitchell (15 March 1947 – 24 January 2021) was a Scottish footballer who played as a forward for Dunfermline Athletic, Aberdeen, Tranmere Rovers, Vancouver Whitecaps, Preston North End, York City, Greenock Morton and Wigan Athletic.

Mitchell was a member of the Dunfermline squad that won the Scottish Cup in 1968.

In March 1978, he joined Wigan Athletic, making 10 league appearances for the club in the Northern Premier League.

Like many other footballers of his era, Mitchell became a publican after retiring from football.
