= Gerry Heaney =

Scottish footballer

Personal information
- Date of birth: 1945 (age 80–81)
- Height: 5 ft 11 in (1.80 m)
- Position: Full back

Youth career
- –1966: Hamilton Academical

Senior career*
Years	Team	Apps	(Gls)
1966–1967	Third Lanark	11	(1)
1974–1975	Vancouver Whitecaps	23	(0)
Total		34	(1)
- * Club domestic league appearances and goals

Gerry Heaney (born 1945) is a Scottish former professional footballer who played as a full back. After playing youth football with Hamilton Academical, Heaney played in the Scottish league for Third Lanark, and in the North American Soccer League for the Vancouver Whitecaps.

During the 1966–67 season, Heaney combined his football career at Third Lanark with a teaching post at Jordanhill College in Glasgow and then Holy Cross High School in Hamilton.
