= 1983 North American Soccer League playoffs =

Tournament details
- Country: United States; Canada
- Dates: April 22 – October 1
- Teams: 8

Final positions
- Champions: Tulsa Roughnecks (1st title)
- Runners-up: Toronto Blizzard
- Semifinalists: Montreal Manic; Golden Bay Earthquakes

Tournament statistics
- Matches played: 16

The 1983 NASL Playoffs was the post-season championship of North American Soccer League (NASL), the top soccer league in the United States and Canada at that time. It was the 16th edition of the NASL Playoffs, the tournament culminating at the end of the 1983 regular season. The playoffs began on September 5, 1983, and concluded with the Soccer Bowl '83 on October 1.

New York Cosmos were the defending NASL champions, having won their fifth title in Soccer Bowl '82, but they were eliminated by Montreal Manic in the Quarterfinals. The 1983 regular season best record were Vancouver Whitecaps, but they were also eliminated in the Quarterfinals, by Toronto Blizzard (1971–1984).

== Qualified teams ==
Eastern Division

- New York Cosmos
- Chicago Sting
- Toronto Blizzard
- Montreal Manic

Southern Division

- Tulsa Roughnecks
- Fort Lauderdale Strikers

Western Division

- Vancouver Whitecaps
- Golden Bay Earthquakes

== Division standings ==
W = Wins, L = Losses, GF = Goals For, GA = Goals Against, PT= point system

6 points for a win in regulation and overtime, 4 point for a shootout win, 0 points for a loss, 1 bonus point for each regulation goal scored, up to three per game.

-Premiers (most points). -Best record. -Other playoff teams.

Eastern Division	W	L	GF	GA	PT
New York Cosmos	22	8	87	49	194
Chicago Sting	15	15	66	73	147
Toronto Blizzard	16	14	51	48	135
Montreal Manic	12	18	58	71	124

Southern Division	W	L	GF	GA	PT
Tulsa Roughnecks	17	13	56	49	145
Fort Lauderdale Strikers	14	16	60	63	136
Tampa Bay Rowdies	7	23	48	87	83
Team America	10	20	33	54	79

Western Division	W	L	GF	GA	PT
Vancouver Whitecaps	24	6	63	34	187
Golden Bay Earthquakes	20	10	71	54	169
Seattle Sounders	12	18	62	61	119
San Diego Sockers	11	19	53	65	106

== Bracket ==
Quarterfinals (Best-of-3)
1	New York Cosmos	2	0(2)	–
8	Montreal Manic	4	1(3)	–
3	Tulsa Roughnecks	3	4	–
6	Fort Lauderdale Strikers	2	2	–
4	Golden Bay Earthquakes	6	0	5
5	Chicago Sting	1	1	2
2	Vancouver Whitecaps	1	3	0
7	Toronto Blizzard	0	4	1

Semifinals (Best-of-3)
8	Montreal Manic	1(8)	1	0
3	Tulsa Roughnecks	2(9)	0	3
3	Golden Bay Earthquakes	0(3)	0	–
7	Toronto Blizzard	1(5)	2	–

Soccer Bowl '83 (Single match)
3	Tulsa Roughnecks	2
7	Toronto Blizzard	0
