= Neil Ellett =

Canadian soccer player

Personal information
- Date of birth: January 5, 1944 (age 82)
- Place of birth: Richmond, British Columbia, Canada
- Positions: Defender; midfielder

Senior career*
Years	Team	Apps	(Gls)
1961–1967	Vancouver North Shore		
1969–1970	Croatia S.C.		
- Vancouver Eintracht
1974–1975	Vancouver Whitecaps	24	(1)

International career
1972–1973	Canada	7	(0)
- * Club domestic league appearances and goals

Neil Ellett (born in Richmond, British Columbia) was a Canadian soccer player who spent his career with Vancouver teams, including the Vancouver Whitecaps of the North American Soccer League. He also played for the member of the Canadian national and Olympic soccer teams.

== Club career ==
Neil Ellett graduated from Burnaby North Secondary School. He began playing for Vancouver North Shore of the Pacific Coast Soccer League when he was seventeen. He played at least one season (1969–70) in the Pacific Coast Soccer League (when the league was amateur) with soccer club Croatia S.C. He also played for Vancouver Eintracht. Ellett was an original member of the Vancouver Whitecaps, playing with the team in 1974 and 1975. His only Whitecap goal was the first scored by the team in their history, on May 4, 1974 at Empire Stadium.

== National team ==
From 1967 to 1973, Ellett made 12 "B" (Olympic) and seven "A" appearances for Canada. He was part of Canada's Pan American Games team in 1967 and 1971 as well as the Olympic Qualifying team in 1971. In a memorable CONCACAF Olympic Qualifying match at Empire Stadium in Vancouver, he scored the lone goal on a header in a 1–0 win over Mexico. He also participated in one round of FIFA World Cup Qualifiers in 1972 (he was 27 years old when he made his debut at the "A" level).

== Referee ==
Ellett is currently a soccer referee and a National referee assessor in British Columbia.

He was inducted into the Burnaby Sports Hall of Fame in 2007. He is also a member of the Canadian Soccer Hall of Fame.
