= Chris Bennett (soccer) =

Canadian former soccer player (born 1952)

Personal information
- Date of birth: 15 January 1952 (age 74)
- Place of birth: London, England
- Position: Forward

Youth career
- 1970–1971: Chelsea

Senior career*
Years	Team	Apps	(Gls)
1974	Vancouver Whitecaps	8	(2)
1976–1977	Seattle Sounders	17	(0)
1978	Memphis Rogues	5	(0)
1979–1980	Cleveland Force (indoor)	25	(6)
Total		55	(8)

International career
1973–1975	Canada	6	(1)
1975	Canadian Olympic	4	(1)

Managerial career
- 1993–1997: Canada U20 (assistant)
- 1998–2000: Canada U15
- 2000–2004: Canadian Soccer Association
- 2004, 2005: Whitecaps FC Women
- 2005: Whitecaps FC men's reserves
- * Club domestic league appearances and goals

Chris Bennett (born 15 January 1952) is a former soccer player who played as a forward in the North American Soccer League. Born in England, he played for the Canada national team at international level. He was one of the original Vancouver Whitecaps players from their first season in 1974. Since retiring from playing, he has been a football coach and instructor in the Vancouver area.

== Club career ==
An English immigrant to Canada, Bennett was a member of the Vancouver Whitecaps of the NASL in their inaugural season of 1974, playing 8 games and netting two goals and an assist. Just before the 1976 season, the Whitecaps traded Bennett to the Seattle Sounders in exchange for Tommy Baldwin. In 1978, he moved to the Memphis Rogues. Prior to going to North America, Bennett was a member of Chelsea in 1970 and '71, although he never played a first-team game . He played indoor soccer at some point, likely the 1978–9 season, for the Cleveland Force.

== International career ==
Bennett earned six 'A' caps between 1973 and 1975 for Canada, scoring once. He also earned four Olympic team caps in 1975, scoring once.

== Coaching career ==
Bennett was a coach for 12 years with the Canadian Soccer Association, including 1998 to 2000 as the U-15 boys' team head coach as well as assistant coach to the U-20 side and as an interim to the national side. The U-20 men's team won the 1995-6 CONCACAF gold medal whereas the 1993-4 team finished third in the same tournament. From 2001 he has provided soccer coaching to his local community in Coquitlam and at Penticton, BC, Canada.

Bennett was in 2005 and possibly 2006 coach of the Whitecaps F.C. men's reserves. In 2004, he led the Whitecaps women's team to the W-League championship which subsequently led to his inauguration in the BC Sports Hall of Fame in 2007.

== Special recognition ==
2004 - 2005 BC Directors Coaching Award, for dedication to the development of soccer through coaching
2001 - 2002 Coach of the Year, North Coquitlam
2014 - Canadian Soccer Hall of Fame inductee
