= Bruce Twamley =

Canadian soccer player

Personal information
- Full name: Bruce Richardson Twamley
- Date of birth: 23 May 1952 (age 74)
- Place of birth: Victoria, British Columbia, Canada
- Position: Defender

Senior career*
Years	Team	Apps	(Gls)
1973–74	Ipswich Town	2	(0)
1975	Vancouver Whitecaps	18	(2)
1977	New York Cosmos	2	(0)
1977–1978	Minnesota Kicks	14	(0)
1978	Oakland Stompers	6	(0)
1979	Edmonton Drillers	9	(0)

International career^{‡}
1972–1977	Canada	8	(1)

Managerial career
- 1998: Canada (interim)
- 2008: Canadian U-23 national team
- * Club domestic league appearances and goals as of 31 May 2006 ‡ National team caps and goals as of 22 June 2006

Bruce Richardson Twamley (born 23 May 1952 in Victoria, British Columbia) is a former Canadian international soccer player.

Twamley began his professional career with Ipswich Town but after only two appearances in two seasons, he moved back to Canada and played for the Vancouver Whitecaps of the North American Soccer League (NASL) for one season in 1975. In 1977, he briefly played for the New York Cosmos before being traded to the Minnesota Kicks during the 1977 season. He began 1978 with Minnesota, but was traded mid-season to the Oakland Stompers. He finished his NASL career with the Edmonton Drillers in 1979.

Twamley was the head coach of the Canadian U-23 national soccer team. He served briefly as interim head coach of the national team in 1998.
