= Paul Dailly =

Scottish-Canadian soccer player and coach

Personal information
- Date of birth: 26 July 1971 (age 55)
- Place of birth: Dundee, Scotland
- Height: 5 ft 9 in (1.75 m)
- Position: Midfielder

Youth career
- 1990–1992: Capilano Blues
- 1993–1994: University of British Columbia

Senior career*
Years	Team	Apps	(Gls)
1995–2004	Vancouver 86ers/Whitecaps	164	(25)
1995–1997	Wichita Wings (indoor)	75	(72)
1998–2000	Edmonton Drillers (indoor)	63	(39)
2000–2001	Detroit Rockers (indoor)	18	(10)
Total		320	(146)
- * Club domestic league appearances and goals

Paul Dailly is a retired Scottish-Canadian soccer player and current coach. He played professionally in the National Professional Soccer League and USL First Division.

== Career ==
Born in Dundee, Scotland, Dailly moved to Canada with his family when he was six. He attended Argyle Secondary School, playing on the boys' soccer team which won the 1988 and 1989 Provincial Championship. In 1990, Dailly began his college career at Capilano University. He was the 1992 team MVP and 1992 All Canada. In 1993 and 1994, he played for the University of British Columbia. In 1995, Dailly turned professional with the Vancouver 86ers in the A-League. He would spend his entire outdoor career with Vancouver. In 2001, the team was renamed the Whitecaps. In the fall of 1995, Dailly began his indoor career with the Wichita Wings of the National Professional Soccer League. He was selected to the NPSL All Rookie First Team that season. In 1998, he joined the Edmonton Drillers. In December 2000, the NPSL shut down the Drillers. Dailly moved to the Detroit Rockers. When the Rockers folded in 2001, the Baltimore Blast selected Dailly in the Dispersal Draft.

From 2003 to 2017, Dailly was the head coach of the men's soccer team at Capilano University. He led the Blues to six BCCAA/PACWEST championships and two CCAA championships, and was named BCCAA/PACWEST Coach of the Year seven times and CCAA Coach of the Year twice.
