= Greg Weber =

Canadian soccer player

Personal information
- Date of birth: 15 April 1950 (age 76)
- Place of birth: Winnipeg, Canada
- Height: 6 ft 1 in (1.85 m)
- Position: Goalkeeper

College career
Years	Team	Apps	(Gls)
- UBC Thunderbirds

Senior career*
Years	Team	Apps	(Gls)
1970	Vancouver Cougars		
1971–1972	Vancouver Croatia		
1974–1976	Vancouver Whitecaps	21	(0)
1975	Vancouver Whitecaps (indoor)		

International career
1973	Canada	2	(0)
- * Club domestic league appearances and goals

Greg Weber (born 15 April 1950) is a Canadian former professional soccer player who played as a goalkeeper.

== Club career ==
Born in Winnipeg, Weber played college soccer for UBC Thunderbirds and at club level for Vancouver Cougars, Vancouver Croatia and Vancouver Whitecaps.

Weber was voted the Pacific Coast League's Most Valuable Player in 1970. In July 1972 he played for the B.C. Premier League All-Stars in an exhibition match against Brazilian club Santos.

== International career ==
Weber made his debut for Canada in an August 1973 friendly match against the United States and earned his second and final cap against Luxembourg in October 1973.
