= Garry Ayre =

Canadian soccer player

Personal information
- Date of birth: October 12, 1953 (age 73)
- Place of birth: Vancouver, British Columbia, Canada
- Position: Defender

Youth career
- 1970: Hull City
- 1970: Oxford United

Senior career*
Years	Team	Apps	(Gls)
?–1976	New Westminster Blues (amateur)	?	(?)
1977, 1978	Vancouver Whitecaps	38	(1)
1978	New York Cosmos	5	(0)
1979–80	Portland Timbers	18	(0)
1979–80	Wichita Wings (indoor)	25	(?)
1981	Baltimore Blast (indoor)	10	(?)

International career^{‡}
1973–1977	Canada	15	(0)
1975–1976	Canadian Olympic (amateur)	10	(0)
- * Club domestic league appearances and goals as of May 7, 2008 ‡ National team caps and goals as of May 7, 2008

Garry Ayre (born October 12, 1953) is a Canadian retired soccer player. He played in the North American Soccer League, the Major Indoor Soccer League and for the Canadian national team.

== Career ==
He was with amateur side New Westminster Blues in 1976. In 1977 Garry turned professional with the Vancouver Whitecaps played 23 games in that first season and 15 in 1978 before being transferred to the New York Cosmos. With the Whitecaps, Ayre was used in a special midfield role to shadow the opposition's key offensive player.

With the Cosmos, Ayre played in Soccer Bowl '78 as a substitute as well as a tour of Europe in the fall of 1978, where the team played against Red Star Belgrade, AEK Athens, Atlético Madrid, Galatasaray and Chelsea. Later they toured South America and played against the Argentina U-23 team which included the young Maradona. In 1979, he moved on to the Portland Timbers where he played 18 games the following season. He was with the national team for World Cup qualifying play in 1976 and 1977, but a serious knee injury kept him off the 1980 roster.

In 1973 Ayre won a Gold Medal playing for the British Columbia Under 23 team at the Canada Summer Games, and in 1975 at the Western Canada Summer Games. In 1979, he signed with the Wichita Wings of the Major Indoor Soccer League and played 25 games indoors during the 1979–80 season. In 1981, he returned to the indoor game with Baltimore Blast but only played ten games before a knee injury ended his career.

== International ==
A member of Canada's 1976 Olympic team, at the Olympic Games in Montreal, Ayre played against the Soviet Union and North Korea. He was also a member of Canada's national team at the Pan American Games in Mexico in 1975.

== Personal ==
Garry's son Keegan Ayre is currently a professional soccer player.

== Coaching career ==
On 10 February 2009, the Coquitlam Metro-Ford Soccer Club announced that their new U-21 men's team will be coached by Ayre.
