= Denny Veitch =

Canadian rugby union player and sports administrator

Dennis Veitch (September 28, 1931 – December 22, 2011) was a Canadian rugby union player and sports administrator who was general manager of the BC Lions of the Canadian Football League and the Vancouver Whitecaps of the North American Soccer League.

== Early life ==
Veitch was born and raised in Kitsilano. His grandfather, William Knight, was mayor of Blairmore, Alberta. In June 1936, he fell from the ladder of a box car while trainhopping and his right arm was crushed by the moving train, necessitating its amputation. His mother died a few years later and by the age 12, he was living in a boarding house and working in a bakery to pay rent.

== Playing career ==
Despite the loss of an arm, Veitch had a standout athletic career at Kitsilano High School, where he was an all-star center on the school's football team. He was also a member of the Meraloma junior football club and the Sons of Scotland soccer team.

Veitch played for the Meraloma, Kats, and Vancouver Reps rugby teams.

== Coaching ==
Veitch coached the Meraloma and Kats junior rugby teams to provincial titles. In 1956, he became an assistant coach for the Meraloma junior football team. He helped lead the team to a provincial junior championship and became the head coach the following season. In 1958, he led the 'Lomas to a Junior Big Four Championship. He returned to the team during the 1961 playoffs, succeeding coach Bill Bowes who had to step aside due to illness. The Meralomas won the western title, but lost the national championship game to the Winnipeg Rods 21–8.

== Administration ==
In 1959, Veitch was named coordinator of minor football for the BC Lions. In 1964, he was a finalist for the Calgary Stampeders general manager opening, but the team elected to promote Rogers Lehew rather than hire an outsider. In 1966, he succeed Herb Capozzi as the Lions general manager after Capozzi was elected to the Legislative Assembly of British Columbia. Following the 1970 season, the Lions hired head coach Eagle Keys away from the Saskatchewan Roughriders and promoted head coach Jackie Parker to general manager, ending Veitch’s tenure as GM.

On December 11, 1973, the North American Soccer League awarded an expansion franchise to Vancouver. Capozzi was the team's principal owner and president and Veitch was the club's general manager. Veitch came up with the team’s name, the Vancouver Whitecaps. The club began play in 1974 and consisted of mostly Canadian players due to a tight budget that made it nearly impossible to sign foreign players. Veitch stepped down after the 1976 season to take care of his ailing wife and was replaced by John Best.

Veitch was the general manager of the 1973 Canada Summer Games, which were hosted by New Westminster and Burnaby, British Columbia, and tournament director of the 1983 World Rugby Cup, which was held in Burnaby. He was also the head of the Brockton Oval Rugby, Cricket, and Bad-Knees Marching Society, which privately raised $300,000 and received a $50,000 federal grant to restore the Brockton Pavilion. He was the manager of the Canada national rugby union team from 1986 to 1987, including its appearance in the inaugural Rugby World Cup.

Veitch was a part of three groups that attempted to purchase the B.C. Lions. He was a part of a Capozzi-led group that tried to buy the team in 1975 and led groups backed by John Reynolds and Milan Ilich that attempted to purchase the team in 1989 and 1992, respectively.

== Personal life ==
Veitch’s wife died of cancer in 1977 and he raised their three children as a single parent. His two daughters each married Whitecaps players (Deanne married Bob Lenarduzzi and Karen married Darryl Samson).

Vetich suffered several strokes following a fall and was diagnosed with Alzheimer's disease in 2005. He died on December 22, 2011.

In 2015, Vetich was inducted into the BC Sports Hall of Fame.
