= Gary Thompson (soccer) =

Canadian soccer player

Personal information
- Full name: Gary Thompson
- Date of birth: August 9, 1945 (age 81)
- Place of birth: Vancouver, British Columbia, Canada
- Position: Striker

Youth career
- University of British Columbia

Senior career*
Years	Team	Apps	(Gls)
1974–1977	Vancouver Whitecaps	27	(2)

International career
1971	Canadian Olympic Team	7	(0)
1976–1977	Canada	7	(0)
- * Club domestic league appearances and goals

Gary Thompson (born August 9, 1945) is a Canadian former soccer player who played as a striker at both professional and international levels.

== Career ==
=== Club career ===
After playing college soccer at the University of British Columbia, Thompson spent four seasons as a professional in the North American Soccer League with the Vancouver Whitecaps, making a total of 27 appearances.

=== International career ===
Thompson played seven times for Canada; four games in 1976 and three in 1977. Thompson was also a member of the Canadian Olympic soccer team which failed to qualify for the 1972 Summer Olympics, making seven appearances in total – one during qualifying and six in the Pan American Games.
