= Brian Budd =

Canadian soccer player (1952–2008)

- Budd with the Toronto Blizzard

Personal information
- Date of birth: April 8, 1952
- Place of birth: Toronto, Ontario, Canada
- Date of death: June 11, 2008 (aged 56)
- Place of death: Toronto, Ontario, Canada
- Height: 1.85 m (6 ft 1 in)
- Position: Striker

Youth career
- ?– 1974: UBC Thunderbirds

Senior career*
Years	Team	Apps	(Gls)
1974–1978	Vancouver Whitecaps	39	(7)
1978	Caribous of Colorado	2	(0)
1978	Toronto Metros-Croatia	11	(5)
1978–1979	Cleveland Force (indoor)	19	(24)
1979–1980	Toronto Blizzard	5	(1)
1980	Houston Hurricane	11	(0)
1980–1981	Baltimore Blast (indoor)	17	(6)

International career
1976–1977	Canada	7	(2)
- * Club domestic league appearances and goals

Brian Vincent Budd (April 8, 1952 – June 11, 2008) was a Canadian professional soccer player best known for winning the World Superstars competition three years in a row from 1978 to 1980. He was also a soccer sportscaster.

== Early years ==
Born in Toronto to an Atlantic Canadian couple and raised in Delta, British Columbia, Brian was the second of four children and an only son.

Budd was an all-around athlete in his youth. He was a competitive swimmer and was training to be a figure skater until he quit at age 14. He did not focus on soccer until he was 19 years old.

== College and professional career ==
Budd won a CIAU championship medal as a member of the UBC Thunderbirds in 1974.

Budd played seven seasons in the North American Soccer League. He began his career with the Vancouver Whitecaps in 1974 in the team's inaugural season and remained with the squad until 1978, when he was acquired by the Colorado Caribou in that team's only season. After languishing on the bench and playing in just two games, Budd requested a trade to the Toronto Metros-Croatia, and the deal was made in May 1978. He scored five goals in his first four games with Toronto. In 1979, Budd returned to the team, renamed the Toronto Blizzard under new owners, but did not play regularly. With a year left on his contract, he was offered an outright release by the Blizzard in November so he could play a full season of indoor soccer. He chose to remain with the Blizzard. Budd began the 1980 season in Toronto but was released in June. He then signed with the Houston Hurricane and played there for the remainder of the season, finishing his NASL career. Budd played indoor soccer professionally with the Cleveland Force of the original Major Indoor Soccer League. He led the Force in scoring in their maiden season, 1978–79, with 29 points (25 goals, 4 assists) and was named the team's MVP. The Force finished the year in last place in the six-team league with the weakest offence in the MISL. He did not return the following year because it would have overlapped with training camp for the outdoor season. In 1980, Budd signed a two-year deal with the Baltimore Blast.

== International career ==
Budd was a member of the Canada national soccer team. He scored two goals in earning seven caps, including a goal against the United States in a 1978 World Cup qualifying match played in Port-au-Prince, Haiti on December 22, 1976, in which Canada prevailed 3–0. His shot deflected off a defender, a post and the crossbar before settling in the American net to give Canada a 1–0 lead in a crucial playoff match. Budd's final international appearance came in a 2–1 victory over Suriname on October 12, 1977 in Mexico City, where he played briefly with a broken leg before coming off in the 77th minute, leaving Canada to play with ten men for the latter part of the match.

== Post-retirement ==
Following his retirement, Budd became a colour commentator on Toronto Blizzard broadcasts in 1982 and was the club's director of public affairs until the end of 1983. He also provided reports from Spain of the 1982 World Cup for CKEY (AM) in Toronto.

"Budgie" worked until his death as a soccer analyst on The Score's The Footy Show.

From 2006, Budd also worked in sales management for InBev, owners of Labatt Brewing Company.

== Superstars ==
From 1977 to 1979, Budd won three straight Canadian Superstars competitions. His Canadian victories earned Budd a spot, for those years, in the annual World Superstars contests, produced by U.S. broadcaster ABC Sports, which Budd won each time. Budd was an excellent all-rounder, doing well in each event that he competed in.

Budd's total winnings from the Canadian and World Superstars contests were about $170,000. His best events were the 800 meter/half mile run and chin ups.

ABC Sports imposed a rule that three-time champions were no longer invited back. Some believe that the rule was created specifically for Budd and refer to it as the "Budd rule". Budd believed that ABC wanted him removed from the show because he was not well known to the American TV audience. ABC Sports had earlier applied the rule to soccer player Kyle Rote Jr. and speed skater Anne Henning, when each won three U.S. Superstars contests. However, well known hurdler Renaldo Nehemiah won four U.S. Superstars competitions in the 1980s and continued to compete.

== Death ==
Budd was found collapsed at his Toronto home on the evening of Wednesday, June 11, 2008, and died late that night. He was survived by his wife Brenda, a son, Riley, and a daughter, Bridgette.

After his death, the Canadian Soccer Hall of Fame established the Brian Budd Award to recognize those who have excelled both in soccer and other endeavours, but who might not otherwise qualify for induction. The candidate must exemplify good character, show outstanding dedication, achievements and leadership in developing soccer in Canada and provide inspiration to past, present and future generations.

== Career statistics ==
Scores and results list Canada's goal tally first.

#	Date	Venue	Opponent	Score	Result	Competition
1	December 22, 1976	Stade Sylvio Cator, Port-au-Prince, Haiti	United States	1–0	3–0	1978 FIFA World Cup qualification
2	October 8, 1977	Estadio Universitario, Monterrey, Mexico	El Salvador	1–2	1–2	1978 FIFA World Cup qualification

== Superstars Record ==
Year	Event	Position
1977	Canadian Final	1st
1978	World Final	1st
1978	Canadian Final	1st
1979	World Final	1st
1979	Canadian Final	1st
1980	World Final	1st
