= Tommy Ord =

English footballer (1952–2020)

Personal information
- Date of birth: 15 October 1952
- Place of birth: London, England
- Date of death: 15 December 2020 (aged 68)
- Position: Forward

Senior career*
Years	Team	Apps	(Gls)
–1972	Erith & Belvedere		
1972–1973	Chelsea	3	(1)
1973	Montreal Olympique	17	(6)
1974–1975	Rochester Lancers	38	(21)
1975–1976	New York Cosmos	6	(2)
1976–1977	Vancouver Whitecaps	31	(8)
1977–1979	Seattle Sounders	44	(13)
1979–1980	Buffalo Stallions (indoor)	9	(3)
1979–1980	Tulsa Roughnecks (indoor)	6	(0)
1980	Tulsa Roughnecks	19	(2)
1980	Atlanta Chiefs	9	(1)
1980–1981	Atlanta Chiefs (indoor)	5	(0)
1981	Phoenix Inferno (indoor)	3	(0)
- * Club domestic league appearances and goals

Tommy Ord (15 October 1952 – 15 December 2020) was an English professional football forward. Nearly all of his professional career was spent in North America.

== Career ==
In 1973, Ord transferred to Montreal Olympique of the North American Soccer League. The Olympique sent Ord to the Rochester Lancers before the 1974 season. In 1975, Ord began the season with the Lancers before being traded to the New York Cosmos mid season. In 1976, the Cosmos sent him to the Vancouver Whitecaps. In 1977 they traded Ord to the Seattle Sounders toward the end of the season. Ord picked up a yellow card and scored Seattle's only goal in a 2–1 loss to the Cosmos in Soccer Bowl '77. In 1977, he was named to the Rochester Lancers Team of the Decade.

Just prior to the 1980 season, the Sounders sent Ord, Bruce Rudroff and cash to the Tulsa Roughnecks in exchange for Jack Brand, Roger Davies and David Nish. He also played briefly for the Phoenix Inferno in the Major Indoor Soccer League.

Following his retirement, Ord continued to play for various amateur teams including Matador F.C. He also worked for American Express in New York City.
