= Les Wilson (soccer) =

English footballer (born 1947)

Personal information
- Full name: Leslie John Wilson
- Date of birth: 10 July 1947 (age 79)
- Place of birth: Manchester, England
- Position: Utility player

Youth career
- Vancouver Collingwood
- Vancouver Army & Navy

Senior career*
Years	Team	Apps	(Gls)
1963–1964	Westminster Royals FC		(3)
1964–1971	Wolverhampton	101	(7)
1967	→ Los Angeles Wolves (guest)	?	(0)
1969	→ Kansas City Spurs (guest)	7	(1)
1970–1971	→ Vancouver Spartans (loan)		
1971–1973	Bristol City	43	(1)
1973–1974	Norwich City	6	(0)
1974–1978	Vancouver Whitecaps	37	(1)
- * Club domestic league appearances and goals

Leslie John Wilson (born 10 July 1947) is an English football administrator and former professional player. He played in The Football League for Bristol City, Norwich City, and most notably Wolverhampton Wanderers, one of the first North American-trained players to do so. Following his playing career with the original North American Soccer League's and his hometown Vancouver Whitecaps, Wilson became a Canadian Soccer Association coach and administrator involved in some of the national program's finest ever results. He is an honoured member of the Canada Soccer Hall of Fame.

== Childhood and youth career ==
His family settled in Vancouver, Canada, when Wilson was seven years old. He played youth soccer for Collingwood Legion in the Vancouver and District Juvenile Soccer League.

== Playing career ==
Les Wilson was just 16 years old when he made his Pacific Coast League debut on 15 September 1963 for the Westminster Royals. He scored three goals in that 1963–64 rookie season and won the Ed Bayley Trophy as BC Soccer's most outstanding player in his first year in senior soccer. He was also selected to play for the Vancouver All-Stars in a 10 June exhibition match against touring Liverpool FC.

Wilson was invited to England to try out for Wolverhampton Wanderers. He made his Wolves first team debut in December 1965, in a Second Division away match against Middlesbrough.

Wilson is one of very few professional footballers to have played in matches in nine different positions, as designated in that era by a player's jersey number, something he achieved while playing for Wolves. During his over ten years playing in England, which also included a brief stint at both Bristol City and Norwich City, Wilson played over 100 First Division matches.

== Coaching and administrative career ==
Wilson became a Whitecaps coach immediately following retiring as a player, helping the club lift the 1979 NASL Soccer Bowl, and stayed on with the club as an administrative until the organisation folded in 1984.

Wilson joined Canada Soccer as a national teams administrator. During his tenure, the senior national team reached their first World Cup finals, Mexico 1986. The side also reached the quarter-finals at the 1984 Summer Olympics and beat huge odds to win the 2000 CONCACAF Gold Cup championship with Wilson on staff.

Wilson was named CONCACAF assistant secretary in 1999. The following year he became executive director of the British Columbia Soccer Association.
