= Brian Gant =

Canadian soccer player

Personal information
- Full name: Brian Reginald Gant
- Date of birth: April 23, 1952 (age 74)
- Place of birth: Vancouver, British Columbia, Canada
- Height: 6 ft 0 in (1.83 m)
- Positions: Midfielder; defender

College career
Years	Team	Apps	(Gls)
- Simon Fraser

Senior career*
Years	Team	Apps	(Gls)
1974–1976	Vancouver Whitecaps	43	(8)
1977–1982	Portland Timbers	128	(12)
1980–1982	Portland Timbers (indoor)	25	(3)

International career
1973–1981	Canada	14	(0)
1973–1975	Canada "B"	3	(0)
- * Club domestic league appearances and goals

Brian Reginald Gant (born April 23, 1952) is a Canadian retired soccer player who spent nine seasons in the North American Soccer League and played fifteen games with the Canada national team.

== Player ==
=== Professional ===
After playing college soccer at Simon Fraser University, Gant signed with the Vancouver Whitecaps of the North American Soccer League in 1974. After three seasons in Vancouver, he moved to the Portland Timbers in 1977. He remained with the Timbers until they folded in 1982, playing a total of six outdoor and two indoor seasons with them.

=== International ===
Gant made 17 combined international ("A" and "B") appearances for Canada from 1973 and 1981. He played in two cycles of FIFA World Cup Qualifiers. He also played for Canada in eight exhibition matches against club or select teams.

== Coach ==
Since 1990, Gant has been a youth coach with F.C. Portland, a youth soccer club in Portland, Oregon. He also coached girls' high school soccer at Catlin Gabel School in Portland, and as such was named District 1 Coach of the Year for 2003. Gant led the Catlin Gabel Eagles to 13 state championships, 11 consecutively from 1994 to 2004.

=== Personal ===
Brian's brother Bruce Gant was also a professional and international soccer player. His brother-in-law Bill Sinclair was a teammate with the New Westminster Blues. His niece Christine Sinclair is a star Canadian player for Portland Thorns FC. His wife is a school teacher and sports coach.

== Sources ==
- Brian Gant at Canada Soccer
- www.fcportland.org
- www.oregonlive.com
- NASL stats
