= Darryl Samson =

Canadian soccer player (born 1952)

Personal information
- Date of birth: 25 August 1952 (age 74)
- Place of birth: Vancouver, British Columbia, Canada
- Height: 5 ft 10 in (1.78 m)
- Position: Midfielder

College career
Years	Team	Apps	(Gls)
- UBC Thunderbirds

Senior career*
Years	Team	Apps	(Gls)
1974–1977	Vancouver Whitecaps	21	(3)

International career
1976	Canada	1	(0)
- * Club domestic league appearances and goals

Darryl Samson (born 25 August 1952) is a Canadian former international soccer player who played as a midfielder.

After playing college soccer for UBC Thunderbirds, he played at club level for the Vancouver Whitecaps.

He later worked as a high school teacher and counselor, as a therapist, and in drug and alcohol intervention.
