= Glen Johnson (soccer) =

Canadian soccer player (born 1951)

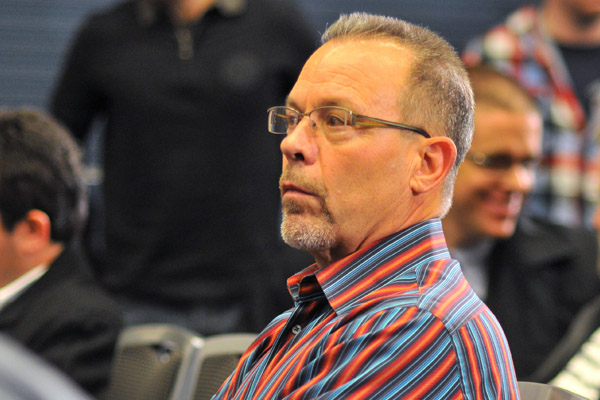

Personal information
- Full name: Lloyd Glen Johnson
- Date of birth: April 22, 1951 (age 75)
- Place of birth: Vancouver, British Columbia, Canada
- Position: Forward

Senior career*
| Years | Team | Apps | (Gls) |
| 1967–68 | Vancouver Firefighters FC | | (1) |
| 1968–69 | Eintracht Vancouver SC | | (8) |
| 1969–1974 | West Bromwich Albion | 3 | (0) |
| 1969, 1970, 1971 | Vancouver Spartans | | |
| 1972 | Eintracht Vancouver SC | | |
| 1972–73 | Norburn | | |
| 1973–74 | Vancouver Pegasus | | |
| 1974–1977 | Vancouver Whitecaps | 59 | (14) |
| 1978–1980 | Vancouver Columbus | | |

International career
| 1972–1976 | Canada | 8 | (1) |
- * Club domestic league appearances and goals

Glen Johnson (born April 22, 1951) is a former Canadian international soccer player and prominent member of the original Vancouver Whitecaps of the NASL. He is an honoured member of the Canada Soccer Hall of Fame.

In the Pacific Coast League, Johnson made his debut at just 16 years old in 1967–68 with Vancouver Firefighters FC. The following season, he joined Vancouver Eintracht and led the team with eight goals. After the 1968–69 season, he joined Vancouver Spartans for the 1969 Western Canada Soccer League season and scored 14 goals in just six weeks. In the club's first-ever match on 18 May, he scored six goals in an 8–2 win over Calgary Buffalo Kickers. Despite playing just half the season, he finished second in league scoring behind John Schepers.

Johnson left in July 1969 for a trial with West Bromwich Albion after he had been spotted in May by manager Alan Ashman during an Albion tour of Canada. He played just 3 league games before suffering a knee injury.

A Vancouver native, Johnson was Whitecap's general manager Denny Veitch's first signing for the team's inaugural season, 1974. Johnson went on to play four seasons in the NASL with the Whitecaps, 1974 through 1977. He was the league's 16th leading scorer in 1975 with 23 points in 21 games. Johnson also played for Vancouver Columbus FC in the 1978, 1979 and 1980 season.

Johnson officially made eight international "A" appearances for Canada from 1972 to 1976, six of which were in FIFA World Cup Qualifiers. He scored in his debut on 20 August 1972 at King George V Park. He played in four games against the United States, three games against Mexico, and one against Poland. He also made four exhibition appearances against club teams from Guatemala, England (Arsenal), and the United States (New York Cosmos).
