= Bruce Wilson (soccer) =

Canadian soccer player (born 1951)

Personal information
- Full name: Bruce Alec Wilson
- Date of birth: June 20, 1951 (age 75)
- Place of birth: Vancouver, British Columbia, Canada
- Height: 1.83 m (6 ft 0 in)
- Position: Fullback

Youth career
- Norburn

Senior career*
Years	Team	Apps	(Gls)
1970	Vancouver Spartans		
1970–1971	Vancouver Columbus FC		
1971–1972	Vancouver Inter-Italia		
1973–1974	Vancouver Italia		
1974–1977	Vancouver Whitecaps	92	(4)
1978–1979	Chicago Sting	60	(0)
1980	New York Cosmos	18	(0)
1981–1984	Toronto Blizzard	106	(3)
1985	Toronto Inex Canada		

International career
1974–1986	Canada "A"	57	(0)
1974–1984	Canada "B"	10	(0)
Medal record
Representing Canada
Men's Association football
CONCACAF Championship
Winner	1985 North America
- * Club domestic league appearances and goals

Bruce Alec Wilson (born June 20, 1951) is a former NASL and Canadian international soccer player. He played the second most games of any player in the former league, 299 (276 regular season and 23 playoff). He also captained the Canadian team at the 1986 FIFA World Cup. In 2012 as part of the Canadian Soccer Association's centennial celebration, he was named to the all-time Canada XI men's team.

== Playing career ==
After starting his career as an attacking player, he switched to outside fullback where his career flourished in the NASL. He played for the Vancouver Whitecaps from 1974 to 1977, the Chicago Sting in 1978 and 1979, the New York Cosmos in 1980, and the Toronto Blizzard from 1981 to 1984. He was a seven-time all-star selection, including three first-team selections (Vancouver in 1977, Chicago in 1979, Toronto in 1984).

Wilson made 57 international "A" appearances for Canada, a record he held at retirement until it was surpassed by Mike Sweeney. In 1998, he was selected to a CONCACAF "team of the century", the only Canadian to receive the honour. Wilson also represented Canada at the 1984 Los Angeles Olympics at a time when lower-ranked countries were allowed to field professional players. The Canadian team reached the quarter-final stage, losing to Brazil.

Wilson became player-coach of the post-NASL Blizzard in 1985 when they were known as Toronto Inex. The Wilson-led Inex played one season of friendlies against touring sides including Linfield and Everton before shutting down. Wilson became head coach of the University of Victoria men's soccer team in 1987, retiring at the end of the 2022 season. He also coached the Victoria Vistas in the Canadian Soccer League.

In 2000 Wilson was inducted into the Canadian Soccer Hall of Fame. In 2003, he was also elected to the U.S. National Soccer Hall of Fame.

== Coaching career ==
Wilson has been head coach of the University of Victoria Vikes for over three decades.

== Honours ==
=== Player ===
New York Cosmos

- NASL: 1980

Toronto Blizzard

- NASL: runners-up: 1983, 1984

Canada

- CONCACAF Championship: 1985

=== Individual ===
- NASL All-Stars: First-team: 1977, 1979, 1984; Second-team: 1978, 1983; Honorable mention: 1976, 1982
- CONCACAF Team of the Century: 1998
