= Sam Lenarduzzi =

Canadian soccer player (born 1949)

Personal information
- Full name: Silvano Lenarduzzi
- Date of birth: December 19, 1949 (age 76)
- Place of birth: Udine, Italy
- Height: 1.78 m (5 ft 10 in)
- Position: Fullback

Youth career
- 1961–1966: Grandview Legion

Senior career*
Years	Team	Apps	(Gls)
1966–72	Vancouver Columbus FC		
1970	Vancouver Spartans		
1973–74	Vancouver Italia		
1974–78	Vancouver Whitecaps	98	(2)
1979–82	Toronto Blizzard	64	(1)
1980	Toronto Blizzard (indoor)	18	(2)

International career
1968–1980	Canada "A"	28	(0)
1967–1974	Canada "B"	15	(0)
- * Club domestic league appearances and goals

Silvano "Sam" Lenarduzzi (born December 19, 1949) is a former Canadian soccer player. He was a two-time national champion with British Columbia Selects (1966) and Vancouver Columbus FC (1969). He represented Canada in three cycles of FIFA World Cup Qualifiers. He was part of the inaugural class honoured by the Canada Soccer Hall of Fame in 2000.

Born in Udine, Italy, but raised in Vancouver, Lenarduzzi made his international debut in 1967 as member of the Pan American Games team in Winnipeg. He went on to play in the Pan American Games again in Cali, Colombia in 1971. In 1977 Lenarduzzi was named into the tournament all star team during the pre-World Cup competition in Mexico. From 1967 to 1980, he made 43 combined international appearances ("A" and "B") for Canada, at the time a national record.

Lenarduzzi was just 16 years old when he made his Pacific Coast League debut with Columbus FC during the 1965–66 season. The following season, he won the Ed Bayley Trophy as BC Soccer's most outstanding player in his first year in senior soccer. He was still a teenager when he won his first of three-straight Pacific Coast League championships in 1968–69. He also helped British Columbia win the inaugural Canada Games Soccer Tournament in 1969.

A full back who was converted to sweeper later in his career, Lenarduzzi joined Vancouver Whitecaps when that club was formed in 1974 and played a major role in defence until he transferred to Toronto Blizzard in 1979.

In July and August 1974, he trained with Eintracht Frankfurt in Germany.

He has coached at the Vancouver Whitecaps running camps. He has even been given the nickname 'The Legend' by some of his fellow coaches. in 2011, he received the BC Community Achievement Award.

== Personal life ==
There were four Lenarduzzi brothers that played soccer in Vancouver: Vanni, Sam, Bob and Dan. Sam played alongside Vanni and Bob with Columbus FC and then later played alongside Bob with Whitecaps FC. Sam and Bob also played together for Canada.
