= Empire Stadium (Vancouver) =

Former sporting venue in British Columbia, Canada

Coordinates: 49°16′57.5″N 123°1′59.6″W

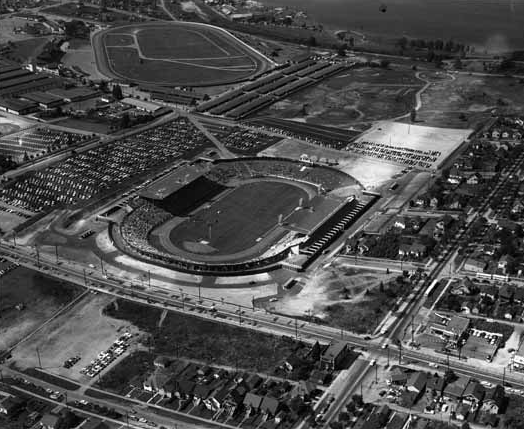
- The stadium in July 1954
- Interactive map of Empire Stadium
- Location: East Hastings Street, Vancouver
- Owner: City of Vancouver
- Capacity: 32,729
- Surface: Natural grass (1954–1969); Artificial turf (1970–1993)

Construction
- Opened: start 1954; 72 years ago
- Demolished: 1993; 33 years ago

Tenants
- BC Lions (CFL) (1954–1982); Vancouver Whitecaps (NASL) (1974–1983); Vancouver Royals (USA/NASL) (1967–1968)

Empire Stadium was a multi-purpose stadium that stood at the Pacific National Exhibition site at Hastings Park in Vancouver, British Columbia, Canada. Track and field and Canadian football, as well as soccer, rugby and musical events, were held at the stadium. The stadium was originally constructed for the 1954 British Empire and Commonwealth Games. The stadium (which sat 32,375 upon opening, but 30,229 after 1974) hosted both Elvis Presley and The Beatles. It saw most of its use as the home of the BC Lions of the CFL from 1954 to 1982, in which the venue also played host to the first Grey Cup game held west of Ontario in 1955. Empire Stadium also hosted the Grey Cup game in 1958, 1960, 1963, 1966, 1971, and 1974; seven times in total.

== History ==
With Vancouver holding the 1954 British Empire and Commonwealth Games, a main stadium venue was required to hold the opening ceremony and the athletics events. However, as the games approached, the city council were $400,000 short and it required a compromise which resulted in work starting on 4 September 1953 on a 25,000 seater venue to the cost of $1.5-million.

The two most famous events of the games were the One mile race, in which both John Landy and Roger Bannister ran the distance in under four minutes. The race's end is memorialized in a statue of the two (with Landy glancing over his shoulder, believing Bannister was on his inside), that stood outside the stadium until its demolition. The statue formerly stood near the south end of Hastings St., but has since been moved to the Pacific National Exhibition north entrance just metres from where the feat took place at the new Empire Fields. The second event was the heart-breaking final stages of the marathon, which saw Jim Peters collapse several times and despite having a near 17 minutes lead he failed to finish and was stretchered away and never raced again.

After the games, BC Lions took control of the venue and it hosted seven Grey Cup games from 1955 to 1974.

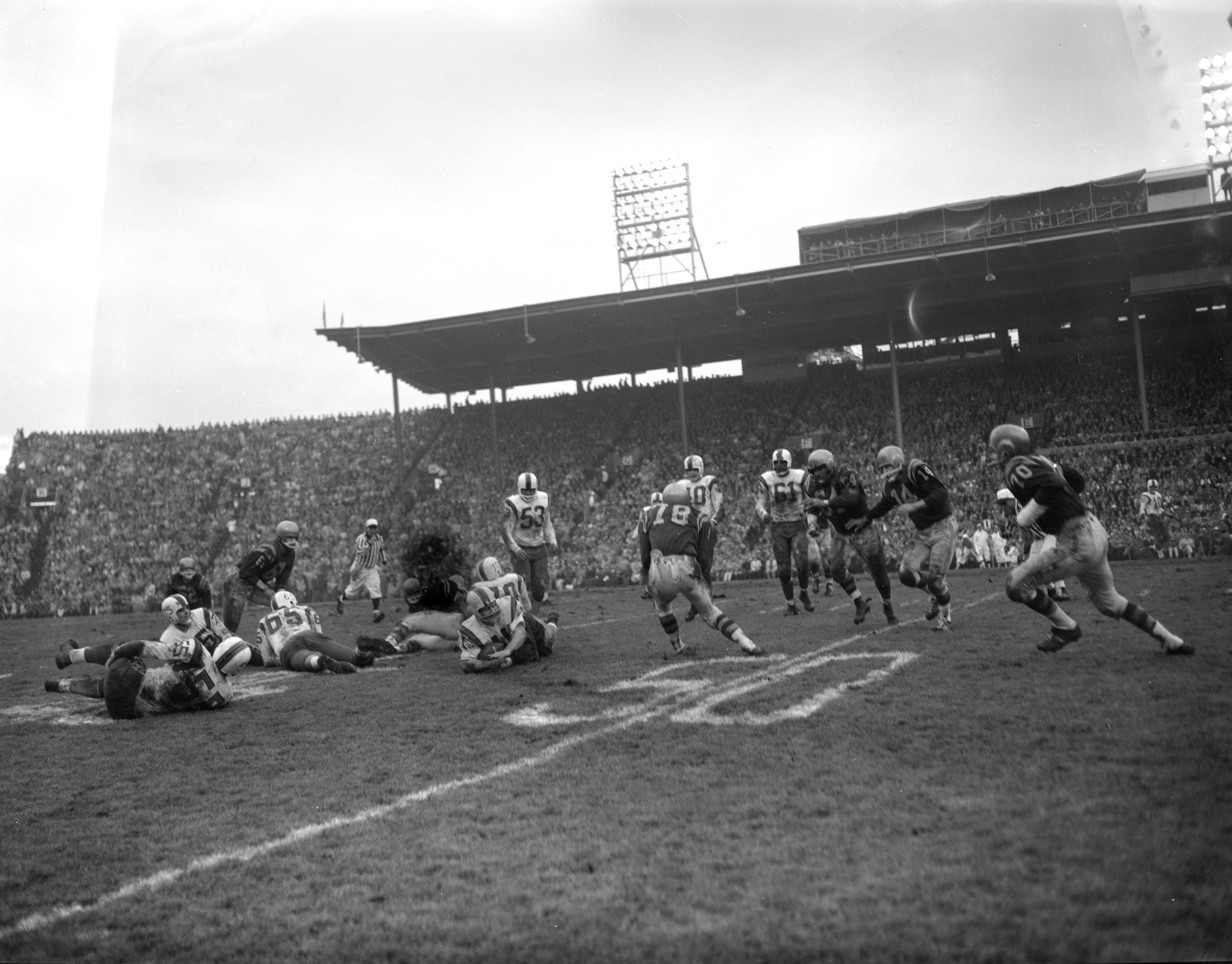
1955 Grey Cup at Empire Stadium

The Stadium was often home to the Shrine Bowl Provincial Championship for provincial senior high school and was also home to the Vancouver Whitecaps of the North American Soccer League during the 1970s and early 1980s, as well as the Vancouver Royals of the same league for their only year of play in 1968.

Just before the 1966 Grey Cup game, the stadium had the new "gooseneck" or "slingshot" goal posts erected invented by Jim Trimble and Joel Rottman, marking the first time these goalposts were used at any level of football in a championship game. They were first used a week earlier at Montreal's Autostade for the 1966 Eastern Conference final; this model goalpost would soon become the standard design in the NFL and CFL. In 1970, it became the first facility in Canada to have artificial playing surface installed made by 3M, under the brand name "Tartan Turf".

By the late 1970s the stadium began to show its age and Erwin Swangard the PNE president suggested a new stadium and convention centre for Hastings Park. False Creek was chosen as the area for the stadium and Coal Harbour for the convention centre, leading to Expo 86 and SkyTrain. Both the Lions and Whitecaps moved to BC Place Stadium for the 1983 season.

The stadium was demolished in the early 1990s. The site served as a parking lot for the neighbouring Pacific National Exhibition as well as Playland for many years before being converted to a soccer field and track on the site of the old field.

With BC Place Stadium undergoing renovations in 2010 and 2011, the BC Lions and Vancouver Whitecaps played their home games at Empire Field, a temporary field constructed on the former grounds of Empire Stadium. After the renovations to BC Place were complete, the temporary stadium was removed. The park and sports fields were restored for community use.

== See also ==
- List of Commonwealth Games venues
