= Vancouver Whitecaps (1974–1984) =

Defunct Canadian soccer club

- Full name: Vancouver Whitecaps
- Nickname: The 'Caps
- Founded: December 11, 1973
- Dissolved: 1984; 42 years ago
- Stadium: Empire Stadium (1974–1983); BC Place (1983–1984); Indoor: Pacific Coliseum (1980–81, 1983–84); PNE Agrodome (1981–1982)
- Capacity: 30,000 (Empire); 60,000 (BC Place); 15,613 (Coliseum); 3,200 (Agrodome)
- League: NASL
- 1984: 2nd, West Division; Playoffs: Semifinals
Home colours	Away colours

The original Vancouver Whitecaps were a professional soccer team founded on December 11, 1973. During the 1970s and 1980s they played in the North American Soccer League (NASL).

The Whitecaps of that era included international players such as Alan Ball, Ruud Krol and Bruce Grobbelaar, but also British Columbian stars like Bobby and Sam Lenarduzzi, Buzz Parsons, and Bruce Wilson.

In 1979, the team from the "Village of Vancouver" (a reference to ABC TV sportscaster Jim McKay's observation that "Vancouver must be like the deserted village right now", with so many people watching the game on TV) beat the powerhouse New York Cosmos in one of the most thrilling playoff series in NASL history to advance to the 1979 Soccer Bowl. Saturday, September 8, 1979, they triumphed against the Tampa Bay Rowdies at the Giants Stadium before a crowd of 50,699 (66,843 tickets had been sold for the game).

It was during this short period that soccer interest peaked in Vancouver. The Whitecaps attendance at Empire Stadium grew to an average of 28,000 per game with playoff matches reaching the 32,000 capacity. The team also recorded two tracks, with "White Is the Colour" (a takeoff on Chelsea's "Blue Is the Colour") becoming a hit on local radio during the run-up to their championship win.

The Whitecaps kit starting in 1978 featured a new two-tone blue design created by Vancouver-based graphic designer Dick Martin, who also re-designed the logo and jersey for the CFL team BC Lions.

After playing at Vancouver's 32,000-seat Empire Stadium for most of their existence, the team moved into the new 60,000-seat BC Place Stadium in 1983.

The team played indoor soccer on and off during their existence. The Pacific Coliseum served as the home field for their 1980–81 and 1983–84 NASL indoor seasons. However, for the 1981–82 indoor season the Whitecaps used the much smaller PNE Agrodome, as the Pacific Coliseum became unavailable.

== History ==
Vancouver was announced as an expansion franchise in the North American Soccer League on December 11, 1973, set to enter the league in 1974 alongside Seattle, Los Angeles, and San Jose. The seven-person ownership group was led by Herb Capozzi and included several businesspeople from the Lower Mainland. The city had previously hosted the Vancouver Royal Canadians, a United Soccer Association team that played for the 1967 season with players from Sunderland A.F.C and in 1968 as the Royals before folding. The team announced their name, the Whitecaps, in February 1974 and signed their first player, former West Bromwich Albion striker and Vancouver native Glen Johnson.

== Year-by-year ==
This is a complete list of seasons for the NASL club. For a season-by-season history including the current MLS franchise, see History of Vancouver Whitecaps FC. For solely MLS results, see List of Vancouver Whitecaps FC seasons.

Season	League											Position			Playoffs	Continental	Average attendance	Top goalscorer(s)	
Season	Div	League	Pld	W	L	D	GF	GA	GD	Pts	PPG	Div.	Conf.	Overall	Playoffs	Continental	Average attendance	Name	Goals
1974	1	NASL	20	5	11	4	29	31	–2	70	3.50	4th	—	12th	DNQ	Ineligible	10,098	(Canada) Brian Gant	6
1975	1	NASL	22	11	11	0	38	28	+10	99	4.50	4th	—	11th	DNQ	Ineligible	7,579	(Canada) Glen Johnson	8
1976	1	NASL	24	14	10	0	38	30	+8	120	5.00	3rd	5th	9th	R1	Ineligible	8,655	3 players	5
1977	1	NASL	26	14	12	0	43	36	+7	124	4.77	2nd	4th	7th	R1	Ineligible	11,897	(England) Derek Possee	11
1978	1	NASL	30	24	6	0	68	29	+39	199	6.63	1st	2nd	2nd	QF	Ineligible	15,736	(England) Kevin Hector	21
1979	1	NASL	30	20	10	0	54	34	+20	172	5.73	1st	3rd	4th	W	Ineligible	22,962	(England) Kevin Hector	15
1980	1	NASL	32	16	16	0	52	47	+5	139	4.34	3rd	7th	14th	R1	Ineligible	26,834	(England) Trevor Whymark	15
1981	1	NASL	32	21	11	0	74	43	+31	186	5.81	1st	—	3rd	R1	Ineligible	23,236	(Canada) Carl Valentine	10
1982	1	NASL	32	20	12	0	58	48	+10	160	5.00	3rd	—	5th	QF	Ineligible	18,254	(England) Ray Hankin	11
1983	1	NASL	30	24	6	0	63	34	+29	187	6.23	1st	—	2nd	QF	Ineligible	29,166	(England) David Cross	19
1984	1	NASL	24	13	11	0	51	48	+3	117	4.88	2nd	—	4th	SF	Ineligible	15,190	(England) Peter Ward	16
Total	–	–	302	182	116	4	568	408	+160	1573	5.21	–	–	–	–	–	Unknown	167	

1. Avg. attendance include statistics from league matches only.
2. Top goalscorer(s) includes all goals scored in League, League Playoffs, Canadian Championship, CONCACAF Champions League, FIFA Club World Cup, and other competitive continental matches.

=== Indoor ===
Season	League							Position		Playoffs
Season	League	Pld	W	L	GF	GA	GD	Conf.	Overall	Playoffs
1975	NASL	2	1	1	18	11	+7	2nd	6th	DNQ
1976	NASL	2	0	2	8	29	−21	4th	12th	DNQ
1980–81	NASL	18	11	7	91	96	−5	1st	5th	SF
1981–82	NASL	18	10	8	93	94	−1	3rd	6th	R1
Total		40	22	18	210	230	−20			

== Honours ==
NASL Championship

- 1979

Conference titles

- 1979 National Conference Champions

Division titles

- 1978 Western Division (National Conference)
- 1979 Western Division (National Conference)
- 1981 Northwest Division
- 1980–81 Northwest Division (indoor)
- 1983 Western Division

NASL attendance leader

- 1983 (29,164 per game)
- 1984 (15,208 per game)

NASL coach of the year

- 1978 Tony Waiters
- 1982 Johnny Giles

North American player of the year

- 1978 Bob Lenarduzzi
- 1983 Tino Lettieri

NASL playoff MVP

- 1979 Alan Ball

NASL leading goalkeeper

- 1978 Phil Parkes (GAA: 0.95, Wins: 23, SO: 10)
- 1979 Phil Parkes (GAA: 0.96, SO: 7)
- 1982 Tino Lettieri (GAA: 1.23)
- 1983 Tino Lettieri (GAA: 0.86, GA: 25, SO: 11)

U.S. Soccer Hall of Fame members

- 2003: Bob Lenarduzzi, Arnie Mausser, Bruce Wilson

Indoor Soccer Hall of Fame members

- 2014 Dale Mitchell

Indoor All-Star game

- 1983–84 Reserves: Carl Valentine, Peter Ward, Tino Lettieri

All-Star First Team selections

- 1977 Bruce Wilson
- 1979 Phil Parkes
- 1980 Rudi Krol
- 1983 David Watson, Frans Thijssen
- 1984 Frans Thijssen, Peter Ward

All-Star Second Team selections

- 1977 Buzz Parsons
- 1978 John Craven, Kevin Hector
- 1979 Alan Ball, Bob Lenarduzzi
- 1981 Peter Lorimer, Pierce O'Leary
- 1983 Tino Lettieri
- 1983–84 Carl Valentine (indoor)
- 1984 Bob Lenarduzzi, Fran O'Brien

All-Star honourable mentions

- 1976 Tommy Ord
- 1982 Carl Valentine, John Wile
- 1983 Peter Beardsley, David Cross, Fran O'Brien
- 1984 Paul Bradshaw, Carl Valentine

Indoor All-Stars

- 1980–81 Carl Valentine, Gerry Gray, Bruce Grobbelaar

Canadian Soccer Hall of Fame members

- 2000 Sam Lenarduzzi, Luigi Moro, Bruce Wilson
- 2001 Gerry Gray, Bob Lenarduzzi, Tino Lettieri, Tony Waiters
- 2002 Dale Mitchell, Mike Sweeney
- 2003 Ian Bridge, Buzz Parsons, Carl Valentine
- 2004 Bob Bolitho
- 2005 Garry Ayre
- 2006 Brian Robinson, Randy Samuel
- 2007 Herb Capozzi, Glen Johnson
- 2008 Bruce Twamley, Les Wilson
- 2009 Neil Ellett
- 2011 Victor Kodelja, Soccer Bowl '79 Champions
- 2014 Chris Bennett

== Statistics ==
=== Attendance ===
The record home attendance for a Whitecaps game was on June 20, 1983. 60,342 came to watch the caps take on the Seattle Sounders in the first game at BC Place Stadium. It was also the largest crowd to ever see a club soccer match in Canada until the Montreal Impact surpassed the mark with 60,860 on May 12, 2012.

Original NASL Whitecaps Logo.

==== Average yearly attendance ====
- 1974 10,098
- 1975 7,579
- 1976 8,656
- 1977 11,897
- 1978 15,724
- 1979 22,962
- 1980 26,834
- 1981 23,236
- 1982 18,251
- 1983 29,164
- 1984 15,208

== See also ==
- Vancouver Royals
- History of Vancouver Whitecaps FC

Preceded by 1978 Cosmos	NASL Champions; 1979 (first title)	Succeeded by 1980 New York Cosmos
