= List of Canada men's international soccer players =

The Canada men's national soccer team represents the country of Canada in international soccer. It is fielded by the Canada Soccer Association, the governing body of soccer in Canada, and competes as a member of the CONCACAF, which encompasses the countries of North America, which includes Central America and the Caribbean region. Canada competed in their first official international soccer match on June 7, 1924, a 3–2 defeat to the Australian national team in Brisbane, Queensland.

Canada have competed in numerous competitions, and all players, either as a member of the starting eleven or as a substitute, are listed below. Each player's details include the number of caps earned and goals scored in all international matches, the date, in yyyy-mm-dd format, and opponent of their first and last matches played in (a blank in the "last cap" column indicates an active player who has been called up in the last 12 months), ordered alphabetically. All statistics are correct up to and including the match played on November 16, 2026. Players that are still active at the club and/or international level are in bold.

== Full list of players ==
Player	Caps	Goals	Date of first cap	Opponent	Date of last cap	Opponent	Notes
**Sam Adekugbe**	43	1	2015-09-08	Belize			
Stephen Ademolu	5	0	2005-11-16	Luxembourg	2010-05-29	Venezuela	
**Stephen Afrifa**	2	0	2024-09-07	United States			
Fernando Aguiar	13	0	1995-01-26	Portugal	1999-07-09	Saudi Arabia	
**Ali Ahmed**	28	1	2023-06-27	Guadeloupe			
**Fraser Aird**	8	1	2015-10-13	Ghana			
Tesho Akindele	19	3	2015-06-11	Dominica	2021-07-29	Mexico	
**Ayo Akinola**	4	0	2021-07-15	Haiti			
**Keven Aleman**	3	0	2013-07-11	Mexico			
Haidar Al-Shaïbani	1	0	2010-05-29	Venezuela	2010-05-29	Venezuela	
George Anderson	6	0	1924-06-07	Australia	1924-07-26	Australia	
**Manny Aparicio**	1	0	2014-10-14	Colombia			
Don Archibald	4	0	1927-06-25	New Zealand	1927-07-23	New Zealand	
**Scott Arfield**	16	2	2016-03-25	Mexico			
Robbie Aristodemo	7	1	1997-08-17	Iran	2000-06-04	Cuba	
Nana Attakora	10	0	2010-01-31	Jamaica	2017-01-22	Bermuda	
Gary Aubert	1	1	1973-08-01	Poland	-	-	
Geoff Aunger	44	4	1992-04-02	China	1997-11-16	Costa Rica	
Garry Ayre	15	0	1973-10-07	Luxembourg	1977-10-22	Mexico	
Jimmie Baillie	1	0	1926-11-06	United States	-	-	
**Theo Bair**	7	1	2020-01-07	Barbados			
Iain Baird	9	0	1984-10-21	Tunisia	1986-09-06	Singapore	
Mike Bakic	4	2	1977-10-12	Suriname	1977-10-22	Mexico	
Carmelo Barbieri	1	0	1974-04-12	Bermuda	-	-	
**Zorhan Bassong**	7	0	2020-01-10	Barbados			
Gary Batchelor	3	0	1973-08-05	United States	1973-11-12	Haiti	
Jonathan Beaulieu-Bourgault	9	0	2009-11-14	North Macedonia			
**Kyle Bekker**	18	0	2013-01-26	Denmark			
John Bell	1	0	1926-11-06	United States	-	-	
Chris Bennett	6	1	1973-11-10	Haiti	1975-01-05	Cuba	
Jason Bent	32	0	1997-10-12	Mexico	2003-11-18	Republic of Ireland	
Eddy Berdusco	18	4	1992-06-13	Hong Kong	1997-11-16	Costa Rica	
Myron Bereza	2	0	1957-07-04	Mexico	1957-07-07	United States	
Patrice Bernier	56	2	2003-11-15	Czech Republic	2017-07-20	Jamaica	
Jim Berry	4	0	1968-10-06	Bermuda	1968-10-27	United States	
Mauro Biello	4	0	1995-10-11	Chile	2000-01-08	Trinidad and Tobago	
Zeljko Bilecki	3	0	1976-12-22	Haiti	1977-10-12	Suriname	
Marc Bircham	17	1	1999-04-27	Northern Ireland	2004-06-16	Belize	
Bob Bolitho	23	2	1974-10-09	East Germany	1981-11-21	Cuba	
**Moïse Bombito**	23	0	2023-06-27	Guadeloupe			
**Tristan Borges**	1	0	2020-01-10	Barbados			
**Milan Borjan**	80	0	2011-02-09	Greece			
Fred Bowman	5	0	1924-06-14	Australia	1924-07-26	Australia	
Jack Brand	1	0	1974-10-28	Hungary	-	-	
**Zachary Brault-Guillard**	8	1	2018-10-16	Dominica			
Adam Braz	12	0	2004-01-18	Barbados	2007-06-01	Venezuela	
Zachary Breganski	1	0	1974-10-09	East Germany	-	-	
Jim Brennan	49	6	1999-04-27	Northern Ireland	2008-09-10	Mexico	
Ian Bridge	34	5	1981-10-12	Trinidad and Tobago	1991-06-30	Mexico	
Bill Brolley	4	0	1927-06-25	New Zealand	1927-07-23	New Zealand	
**Charles-Andreas Brym**	14	1	2020-01-07	Barbados			
**Tajon Buchanan**	69	9	2021-06-05	Aruba	-	-	
Brian Budd	7	2	1976-10-10	Mexico	1977-10-12	Suriname	
Alex Bunbury	64	16	1986-08-24	Singapore	1997-11-16	Costa Rica	
Gordon Burness	1	1	1925-11-08	United States	-	-	
**Alessandro Busti**	1	0	2018-10-16	Dominica			
**Marco Bustos**	6	0	2015-10-13	Ghana			
Buster Cairns	3	0	1957-06-22	United States	1957-07-04	Mexico	
Jeff Cambridge	7	0	1984-10-30	Cyprus	1987-10-06	Mexico	
George Campbell	1	0	1925-06-27	United States	-	-	
Maycoll Cañizalez	5	1	2003-01-18	United States	2003-07-14	Cuba	
Adrian Cann	9	0	2008-01-30	Martinique	2011-02-09	Greece	
Ian Carter	8	0	1992-06-13	Hong Kong	1995-01-26	Portugal	
Arthur Cartwright	1	0	1925-11-08	United States	-	-	
John Catliff	44	18	1984-07-25	Chile	1994-06-12	Netherlands	
**Lucas Cavallini**	40	19	2012-08-15	Trinidad and Tobago			
Harry Chapman	4	0	1924-06-07	Australia	1924-06-28	Australia	
**Jay Chapman**	3	1	2017-01-22	Bermuda			
**Mathieu Choinière**	29	0	2023-10-13	Japan			
Christopher Chueden	6	1	1986-08-24	Singapore	1986-09-06	Singapore	
**Richard Chukwu**	3	0	2026-09-26	Chile			
Tony Chursky	18	0	1973-08-01	Poland	1981-10-12	Trinidad and Tobago	
Frank Ciaccia	2	0	1981-10-12	Trinidad and Tobago	1981-11-12	Honduras	
Andy Clarke	2	0	1925-06-27	United States	1925-11-08	United States	
**Caleb Clarke**	2	0	2013-11-15	Czech Republic			
Jeff Clarke	19	1	1997-08-17	Iran	2002-05-15	Switzerland	
Cosimo Commisso	3	0	1988-03-30	Colombia	1988-04-07	Jamaica	
Enzo Concina	4	1	1988-07-15	Poland	1993-07-18	Mexico	
John Connor	4	0	1983-06-12	Scotland	1983-12-11	Honduras	
Carlo Corazzin	59	11	1994-06-01	Morocco	2004-10-13	Costa Rica	Top scorer in the 2000 GC (4 goals), 2000 GC Best XI
**Theo Corbeanu**	7	2	2021-03-25	Bermuda			
La'Vere Corbin-Ong	1	0	2017-03-22	Scotland	-	-	Later played for Malaysia
**Juan Córdova**	2	0	2017-06-13	Curaçao			
**Derek Cornelius**	48	1	2018-09-09	U.S. Virgin Islands			
Frank Crawley	3	0	1927-07-02	New Zealand	1927-07-23	New Zealand	
**Maxime Crépeau**	39	0	2016-02-05	United States			
Pat Cubellis	6	1	1986-08-24	Singapore	1986-09-06	Singapore	
Nick Dasovic	63	2	1992-04-02	China	2004-01-18	Barbados	
**Jonathan David**	87	45	2018-09-09	U.S. Virgin Islands			Canadian all-time top scorer overall (45), Canadian all-time top scorer in the Gold Cup (6 goals), 2019 GC Golden Boot and Best XI
**Promise David**	18	4	2025-06-07	Ukraine			
Jack Davidson	4	1	1927-06-25	New Zealand	1927-07-23	New Zealand	
**Alphonso Davies**	60	15	2017-06-13	Curaçao			2017 GC Golden Boot, Best XI and Young Player Award, first Canadian player to score at a FIFA World Cup
Philippe Davies	1	0	2013-01-26	Denmark	-	-	
**Luc de Fougerolles**	23	0	2024-03-24	Trinidad and Tobago			
Julian de Guzman	89	4	2002-01-26	Martinique	2016-06-03	Azerbaijan	2007 GC Most valuable player, 2009 GC All-Tournament team
Marcel de Jong	56	3	2007-11-20	South Africa	2018-09-09	U.S. Virgin Islands	
Pasquale De Luca	19	1	1984-03-28	Haiti	1985-09-14	Honduras	
Dwayne De Rosario	81	22	1998-05-18	North Macedonia	2015-01-19	Iceland	Canadian all-time top scorer in the Gold Cup (6 goals)
Nick De Santis	9	1	1988-03-26	Peru	1997-10-12	Mexico	
Jason De Vos	49	4	1997-08-17	Iran	2004-10-13	Costa Rica	2002 GC and 2000 GC Best XI
Barry Deardon	3	0	1986-01-29	Paraguay	1986-02-05	United States	
**Amer Đidić**	2	1	2020-01-10	Barbados			
Fred Dierden	8	0	1924-06-07	Australia	1925-11-08	United States	
Gino DiFlorio	1	0	1988-07-15	Poland	-	-	
Bob DiLuca	4	0	1968-10-06	Bermuda	1968-10-27	United States	
A. Fred Dinnie	1	0	1926-11-06	United States	-	-	
Patrick Diotte	5	0	1991-03-16	United States	1995-10-11	Chile	
Jamar Dixon	3	0	2016-02-05	United States			
Paul Dolan	53	0	1984-10-30	Cyprus	1997-11-16	Costa Rica	
Rudy Doliscat	5	1	1992-04-02	China	1995-01-26	Portugal	
Jimmy Douglas	14	1	1972-08-20	United States	1976-10-20	United States	
Terry Dunfield	14	1	2010-05-29	Venezuela	2013-09-10	Mauritania	
Jim Easton Jr.	7	0	1987-09-30	El Salvador	1992-09-03	United States	
David Edgar	42	4	2011-02-09	Greece	2018-03-24	New Zealand	
Ernie Edmunds	4	0	1927-06-25	New Zealand	1927-07-23	New Zealand	
**Raheem Edwards**	5	0	2017-06-13	Curaçao			
Randy Edwini-Bonsu	10	1	2010-01-31	Jamaica			
Neil Ellett	7	0	1972-08-20	United States	1973-11-10	Haiti	
Pat Ercoli	1	0	1980-09-17	New Zealand	-	-	
**Stephen Eustáquio**	64	5	2019-11-15	United States			
Charlie Falzon	9	0	1983-12-06	Mexico	1989-06-08	Belgium	
Jackson Farmer	1	0	2013-09-08	Mauritania			
Roy Faulkner	3	1	1925-06-27	United States	1926-11-06	United States	
Terry Felix	3	0	1983-06-12	Scotland	1983-06-19	Scotland	
Paul Fenwick	33	0	1994-06-12	Netherlands	2003-11-18	Republic of Ireland	
Don Ferguson	4	0	1986-08-30	Indonesia	1987-10-06	Mexico	
Drew Ferguson	9	1	1985-03-10	Trinidad and Tobago	1991-03-16	United States	
Ricardo Ferreira	1	0	2021-03-29	Cayman Islands			
**Ben Fisk**	2	0	2017-01-22	Bermuda			
John Fitzgerald	12	0	1988-02-18	Bermuda	1990-05-13	Mexico	
Carl Fletcher	40	2	1991-07-03	Jamaica	2003-06-01	Germany	
**Marcelo Flores**	2	0	2026-03-28	Iceland			
Leslie Ford	6	0	1924-06-07	Australia	1924-07-26	Australia	
Craig Forrest	56	0	1988-05-25	Chile	2001-06-04	Cameroon	2000 GC Most valuable player
George Forrest	6	2	1924-06-07	Australia	1924-07-26	Australia	
John B. Foy	1	0	1925-06-27	United States	-	-	
Chris Franks	1	0	1998-05-18	North Macedonia	-	-	
Iain Fraser	30	0	1994-06-01	Morocco	1997-11-16	Costa Rica	
**Liam Fraser**	19	0	2019-10-15	United States			
Rob Friend	33	2	2003-01-18	United States	2011-06-11	Guadeloupe	
**Kianz Froese**	2	0	2015-10-13	Ghana			
David Fronimadis	1	0	2004-01-18	Barbados	-	-	
**Jérémy Gagnon-Laparé**	5	0	2013-09-08	Mauritania			
Jim Galloway	2	0	1925-06-27	United States	1926-11-06	United States	
Brian Gant	15	0	1973-08-01	Poland	1981-11-21	Cuba	
Ken Garraway	22	0	1983-12-06	Mexico	1986-02-05	United States	
Charles Gbeke	3	0	2008-01-30	Martinique	2008-11-19	Jamaica	
Tibor Gemeri	1	0	1980-10-25	United States	-	-	
Ali Gerba	31	15	2005-07-02	Honduras	2011-06-11	Guadeloupe	Canadian all-time top scorer in the Gold Cup (6 goals)
Gabriel Gervais	11	0	2004-01-18	Barbados	2007-06-01	Venezuela	
Bill Gibson	4	1	1927-06-25	New Zealand	1927-07-23	New Zealand	
Nick Gilbert	10	1	1988-02-18	Bermuda	1992-09-03	United States	
Peter Gilfillan	1	0	1991-07-03	Jamaica	-	-	
**Marcus Godinho**	5	0	2018-03-24	New Zealand			
**Owen Goodman**	1	0	2026-10-03	Peru			
George Graham	1	1	1926-11-06	United States	-	-	
Sandro Grande	12	1	2004-09-08	Costa Rica	2006-09-04	Jamaica	
Kevin Grant	9	0	1972-08-20	United States	1975-01-05	Cuba	
Gerry Gray	34	2	1980-09-15	New Zealand	1991-03-16	United States	
Peter Greco	3	0	1968-10-06	Bermuda	1968-10-20	Bermuda	
Doug Greig	3	0	1957-06-22	United States	1957-07-07	United States	
James Grimes	4	1	1988-03-26	Peru	1988-04-07	Jamaica	
Daniel Haber	5	0	2013-05-28	Costa Rica	2014-05-27	Moldova	
**Marcus Haber**	27	3	2010-10-08	Ukraine			
Sven Habermann	11	0	1983-12-11	Honduras	1986-02-05	United States	
Andrew Hainault	44	2	2006-11-15	Hungary			
Art Halliwell	2	0	1925-06-27	United States	1925-11-08	United States	
**Jordan Hamilton**	2	0	2014-10-14	Colombia			
Harold Hansen	2	0	1968-10-20	Bermuda	1968-10-27	United States	
Bob Harley	6	0	1924-06-07	Australia	1924-07-26	Australia	
Kevin Harmse	9	0	2007-03-25	Bermuda	2008-11-19	Jamaica	
Bill Harper	1	0	1968-10-27	United States	-	-	
Pat Harrington	1	0	1992-09-03	United States	-	-	
Alan Harvey	4	0	1968-10-06	Bermuda	1968-10-27	United States	
Richard Hastings	59	1	1998-05-18	North Macedonia	2010-05-29	Venezuela	2007 GC All-Tournament team
Tyler Hemming	2	0	2009-05-30	Cyprus	2010-01-31	Jamaica	
Doneil Henry	44	1	2012-08-15	Trinidad and Tobago			
**Kyle Hiebert**	2	0	2023-03-28	Honduras			
Lars Hirschfeld	48	0	2000-01-11	Bermuda	2013-11-15	Czech Republic	2002 GC Top Goalkeeper
**Junior Hoilett**	70	17	2015-10-13	Ghana			
Kevin Holness	9	2	1995-05-22	Northern Ireland	1996-06-05	Costa Rica	
Lyndon Hooper	67	3	1986-08-24	Singapore	1997-06-01	Costa Rica	
Chris Horrocks	12	0	1972-08-29	United States	1977-09-11	Trinidad and Tobago	
Dick Howard	5	0	1972-08-20	United States	1973-11-10	Haiti	
Art Hughes	4	2	1957-06-22	United States	1957-07-07	United States	
John Hughes	5	0	1986-08-27	North Korea	1987-10-06	Mexico	
Iain Hume	43	6	2003-02-12	Libya	2016-06-07	Uzbekistan	
Atiba Hutchinson	104	8	2003-01-18	United States			Canadian all-time top appearance holder overall (103)
Lucio Ianiero	17	2	1986-08-24	Singapore	1992-04-02	China	
Robert Iarusci	26	2	1976-09-24	United States	1983-06-16	Scotland	
Daniel Imhof	36	0	2000-10-09	Panama	2009-05-24	Argentina	
Dominic Imhof	1	0	2009-05-30	Cyprus	-	-	
Gordie Ion	2	0	1957-06-22	United States	1957-06-30	Mexico	
Greg Ion	6	0	1983-12-06	Mexico	1988-05-19	Greece	
**Callum Irving**	1	0	2017-01-22	Bermuda			
**Jovan Ivanišević**	3	0	2026-09-26	Chile			
Keith Izatt	2	0	1987-10-02	Honduras	1987-10-06	Mexico	
**Simeon Jackson**	49	6	2009-05-30	Cyprus			
Anthony Jackson-Hamel	9	3	2016-10-06	Mauritania			
**Dejan Jakovic**	41	1	2008-01-30	Martinique			
**Evan James**	2	0	2013-01-26	Denmark			
**Manjrekar James**	17	2	2015-01-16	Iceland			
Paul James	47	2	1983-12-06	Mexico	1993-03-09	South Korea	
Steve Jansen	8	0	1988-02-18	Bermuda	1989-06-08	Belgium	
Ante Jazic	35	1	1998-05-18	North Macedonia	2012-10-12	Cuba	
**Daniel Jebbison**	10	0	2025-03-20	Mexico			
Glen Johnson	8	1	1972-08-20	United States	1976-10-27	Mexico	
**Will Johnson**	44	4	2005-11-16	Luxembourg			
**Alistair Johnston**	63	1	2021-03-25	Bermuda			
**Alfie Jones**	2	0	2025-11-18	Venezuela			
Frank Jonke	1	0	2013-01-29	United States	-	-	
Stathis Kappos	1	0	2004-01-18	Barbados	-	-	
Mark Karpun	1	0	1986-04-27	Mexico	-	-	
**Mark-Anthony Kaye**	42	2	2017-06-13	Curaçao			
Jimmy Kelly	1	0	1926-11-06	United States	-	-	
Joe Kennaway	1	0	1926-11-06	United States	-	-	Also played in Scotland national team
**Scott Kennedy**	14	0	2021-06-08	Suriname			
Greg Kern	12	0	1986-02-05	United States	1988-04-07	Jamaica	
John Kerr	10	0	1968-10-06	Bermuda	1977-09-11	Trinidad and Tobago	
**Kevin Khan**	1	0	2026-11-16	Guatemala			
Steve Kindel	4	0	1998-05-18	North Macedonia	1999-07-09	Saudi Arabia	
Mike Klukowski	36	0	2003-02-12	Libya	2012-10-16	Honduras	2009 GC All-Tournament team
**Jamie Knight-Lebel**	5	0	2024-11-19	Suriname			
**Ismaël Koné**	42	4	2022-03-24	Costa Rica			
Tom Kouzmanis	5	4	1995-08-01	Jamaica	1997-08-17	Iran	
Garret Kusch	21	1	1997-04-06	El Salvador	2001-06-04	Cameroon	
**Cyle Larin**	95	32	2014-05-23	Bulgaria			Top scorer in WCQ (17 goals), Top scorer in Concacaf 2022 WCQ
**Richie Laryea**	85	1	2019-09-07	Cuba			
Tony Lecce	8	0	1968-10-06	Bermuda	1972-09-05	Mexico	
Nikolas Ledgerwood	50	1	2007-08-22	Iceland	2017-03-22	Scotland	
Patrick Leduc	3	0	2005-07-02	Honduras	2005-07-09	United States	
Paul Lee	1	0	1983-06-19	Scotland	-	-	
**Wandrille Lefevre**	3	0	2015-10-13	Ghana			
Bob Lenarduzzi	47	4	1973-08-01	Poland	1986-06-09	Soviet Union	
Sam Lenarduzzi	29	0	1968-10-06	Bermuda	1980-09-15	New Zealand	
Tino Lettieri	23	0	1980-09-17	New Zealand	1986-06-09	Soviet Union	
Jayson Leutwiler	3	0	2016-11-11	South Korea			
John Limniatis	44	1	1987-09-30	El Salvador	1997-03-16	United States	
Bill Linning	5	2	1924-06-07	Australia	1924-07-26	Australia	
Dino Lopez	1	0	1992-09-03	United States	-	-	
**Victor Loturi**	1	0	2023-07-04	Cuba			
Jamie Lowery	20	1	1986-01-29	Paraguay	1991-06-30	Mexico	
Shaun Lowther	14	0	1983-12-06	Mexico	1985-05-08	Haiti	
Steven MacDonald	6	1	1992-09-03	United States	1995-10-11	Chile	
Ike MacKay	9	1	1972-08-20	United States	1977-10-20	Haiti	
Ian MacLean	3	0	1995-01-26	Portugal	1995-08-03	Trinidad and Tobago	
**Lukas MacNaughton**	1	0	2022-11-11	Bahrain			
Joseph Majcher	3	0	1991-07-03	Jamaica	1992-06-13	Hong Kong	
Chris Mannella	3	0	2015-01-16	Iceland			
Carmine Marcantonio	2	0	1976-09-24	United States	1980-11-01	United States	
Hector Marinaro	6	0	1986-08-30	Indonesia	1995-10-11	Chile	
Carlo Marini	1	0	1991-06-28	Honduras	-	-	
**Jahkeele Marshall-Rutty**	1	0	2026-03-31	Tunisia			
Craig Martin	6	0	1983-06-19	Scotland	1984-07-25	Chile	
Sita-Taty Matondo	1	0	2003-01-18	United States	-	-	
Gavin McCallum	1	1	2010-05-29	Venezuela	-	-	
Trevor McCallum	18	0	1983-12-06	Mexico	1988-07-15	Poland	
Jim McDonald	4	0	1973-10-07	Luxembourg	1974-04-12	Bermuda	
John McGrane	12	0	1977-10-08	El Salvador	1981-11-06	Haiti	
**Zac McGraw**	4	0	2023-06-27	Guadeloupe			
Bill McKean	2	0	1925-06-27	United States	1925-11-08	United States	
**Ben McKendry**	1	0	2017-01-22	Bermuda			
Kevin McKenna	63	11	2000-05-27	Trinidad and Tobago	2012-10-16	Honduras	2002 GC Best XI
Dave McKenzie	2	0	1925-06-27	United States	1925-11-08	United States	
Doug McKinty	1	0	1992-04-02	China	-	-	
Ed McLaine	2	1	1925-06-27	United States	1925-11-08	United States	
Mitch McLean	6	0	1924-06-07	Australia	1924-07-26	Australia	
Mike McLenaghen	8	0	1975-01-05	Cuba	1981-11-15	Mexico	
Norman McLeod	4	1	1957-06-22	United States	1957-07-07	United States	
Wes McLeod	17	1	1976-10-27	Mexico	1985-06-09	Iraq	
Ed McNally	4	0	1983-06-12	Scotland	1987-09-30	El Salvador	
Doug McNaught	2	0	1985-03-10	Trinidad and Tobago	1985-03-13	Jamaica	
Ralph McPate	4	2	1968-10-06	Bermuda	1968-10-27	United States	
**Sean Melvin**	1	0	2017-01-22	Bermuda			
Tony Menezes	27	0	1998-05-18	North Macedonia	2003-01-18	United States	
Bill Millar	1	0	1973-08-05	United States	-	-	
**Liam Millar**	49	1	2018-03-24	New Zealand			
Bruce Miller	8	2	1975-01-05	Cuba	1984-03-28	Haiti	
Colin Miller	61	5	1983-06-19	Scotland	1997-11-16	Costa Rica	
**Kamal Miller**	52	0	2019-06-23	Cuba			
Bill Milligan	4	0	1927-06-25	New Zealand	1927-07-23	New Zealand	
Dale Mitchell	55	19	1980-09-15	New Zealand	1993-08-15	Australia	
Domenic Mobilio	25	3	1986-01-29	Paraguay	1997-11-09	United States	
James Moir	1	0	1925-11-08	United States	-	-	
Jack Monaghan	4	0	1927-06-25	New Zealand	1927-07-23	New Zealand	
David Monsalve	1	0	2010-01-31	Jamaica			
Malcolm Moon	4	0	1926-11-06	United States	1927-07-09	New Zealand	
Terry Moore	11	0	1983-06-19	Scotland	1986-05-24	England	
Ashtone Morgan	18	0	2011-10-07	Saint Lucia			
Harry Mosher	4	0	1924-06-07	Australia	1924-06-28	Australia	
Doug Muirhead	4	1	1989-04-12	Denmark	1992-04-02	China	
Scott Munson	3	0	1991-06-28	Honduras	1991-07-03	Jamaica	
Issey Nakajima-Farran	38	1	2006-11-15	Hungary			
Martin Nash	38	2	1997-04-06	El Salvador	2008-01-30	Martinique	
Grant Needham	2	0	1991-03-16	United States	1993-08-15	Australia	
**Jayden Nelson**	15	3	2020-01-07	Barbados			
Steve Nesin	3	0	1986-01-29	Paraguay	1986-02-05	United States	
Tony Nocita	8	0	1987-10-02	Honduras	1992-04-02	China	
David Norman	51	1	1983-12-14	Honduras	1994-06-12	Netherlands	
Hank Noseworthy	2	0	1924-07-12	Australia	1924-07-26	Australia	
Tam Nsaliwa	13	0	2001-04-24	Egypt	2008-06-04	Panama	
Olivier Occean	28	6	2004-05-30	Wales	2012-10-12	Cuba	
Norm Odinga	6	1	1989-04-12	Denmark	1993-07-31	Australia	
**Noble Okello**	2	0	2020-01-07	Barbados			
Giuliano Oliveiro	1	0	1995-10-11	Chile	-	-	
**Tani Oluwaseyi**	33	5	2024-06-09	France			
Pat Onstad	57	0	1988-02-18	Bermuda	2010-05-24	Argentina	Longest Canadian international career (22 years)
Andrew Ornoch	3	0	2006-11-15	Hungary	2009-05-30	Cyprus	
**Jonathan Osorio**	92	10	2013-07-07	Martinique			
**Karl Ouimette**	18	0	2013-11-19	Slovenia			
Pedro Pacheco	18	0	2010-05-29	Venezuela			
George Pakos	22	5	1983-12-06	Mexico	1986-06-09	Soviet Union	
Tom Panhuyzen	4	0	1987-10-02	Honduras	1988-06-17	Costa Rica	
Nick Papadakis	4	2	1968-10-06	Bermuda	1968-10-27	United States	
Brad Parker	6	0	1998-05-18	North Macedonia	2000-01-08	Trinidad and Tobago	
Buzz Parsons	24	7	1972-08-20	United States	1980-09-17	New Zealand	
**Tyler Pasher**	2	0	2021-07-15	Haiti			
**Harry Paton**	1	0	2023-10-13	Japan			
Norman Patterson	3	1	1968-10-17	United States	1968-10-27	United States	
Harry J. Paynter	1	0	1927-06-25	New Zealand	-	-	
Ken Pears	4	0	1957-06-22	United States	1957-07-07	United States	
Paul Peschisolido	53	10	1992-06-13	Hong Kong	2004-09-04	Honduras	
Jaime Peters	26	1	2004-08-18	Guatemala	2011-06-01	Ecuador	
**Luca Petrasso**	1	0	2026-10-03	Peru			
**Michael Petrasso**	9	0	2016-06-03	Azerbaijan			
Brian Philley	4	2	1957-06-22	United States	1957-07-07	United States	
Pat Philley	3	0	1957-06-22	United States	1957-07-04	Mexico	
David Phillips	3	0	1984-10-21	Tunisia	1984-11-02	Egypt	
**Samuel Piette**	69	0	2012-06-03	United States			
Tony Pignatiello	10	0	1988-02-18	Bermuda	1988-07-15	Poland	
Matteo Piscopo	1	0	1974-04-12	Bermuda	-	-	
Nevio Pizzolito	8	0	1999-09-02	Jamaica	2004-08-18	Guatemala	
Rocco Placentino	1	0	2005-09-03	Spain	-	-	
**Kwasi Poku**	1	0	2024-10-15	Panama			
Darren Poole	1	0	1981-10-12	Trinidad and Tobago	-	-	
Kyle Porter	7	0	2013-01-26	Denmark			
Chris Pozniak	24	0	2002-01-18	Haiti	2009-05-30	Cyprus	
**Ralph Priso**	6	0	2026-03-28	Iceland			
Tomasz Radzinski	46	10	1995-06-04	Turkey	2009-11-18	Poland	
Randy Ragan	40	0	1980-09-15	New Zealand	1986-08-31	China	
Marco Reda	7	1	2005-02-09	Northern Ireland	2008-01-30	Martinique	
Antonio Ribeiro	3	0	2007-06-01	Venezuela	2010-01-31	Jamaica	
Tosaint Ricketts	61	17	2011-02-09	Greece	2020-01-15	Iceland	
Tom Riley	1	0	1975-01-05	Cuba	-	-	
Carlos Rivas Godoy	1	0	2010-01-31	Jamaica	-	-	
Marco Rizi	12	0	1992-09-03	United States	1995-08-01	Jamaica	
Mallan Roberts	1	0	2015-06-16	Dominica			
Quillan Roberts	1	0	2015-03-30	Puerto Rico	-	-	Later played for Guyana
Brian Robinson	16	1	1972-08-20	United States	1976-12-22	United States	
Peter Roe	9	1	1974-10-09	East Germany	1983-06-19	Scotland	
Mark Rogers	7	0	2000-10-09	Panama	2003-11-18	Republic of Ireland	
Bryan Rosenfeld	1	0	1987-10-02	Honduras	-	-	
Tyler Rosenlund	1	0	2008-01-30	Martinique	-	-	
**Jacen Russell-Rowe**	12	0	2023-06-27	Guadeloupe			
Darryl Samson	1	0	1976-10-27	Mexico	-	-	
**Nathan Saliba**	23	3	2024-09-07	United States			
Randy Samuel	82	0	1983-12-11	Honduras	1997-11-16	Costa Rica	
William Sanford	1	0	1924-06-07	Australia	-	-	
Peter Sarantopoulos	25	0	1988-02-18	Bermuda	1993-03-11	South Korea	
Frank Sauer	2	0	1973-11-13	Haiti	1974-04-12	Bermuda	
Joe Schiraldi	8	1	1972-08-20	United States	1973-11-12	Haiti	
Roderick Scott	5	0	1993-03-04	United States	1993-07-18	Mexico	
Branko Segota	19	2	1980-10-18	Mexico	1988-10-15	Guatemala	
Adrian Serioux	19	1	2004-08-18	Guatemala	2008-10-15	Mexico	
**Jacob Shaffelburg**	39	8	2020-01-10	Barbados			
Alex Shaw	1	0	1957-07-07	United States	-	-	
**Shamit Shome**	2	0	2020-01-07	Barbados			
Eddy Sidra	3	0	2009-05-30	Cyprus	2010-05-29	Venezuela	
**Niko Sigur**	27	2	2024-09-10	Mexico			
Dave Simpson	1	0	2008-01-30	Martinique	-	-	
Josh Simpson	43	4	2004-01-18	Barbados	2012-02-29	Armenia	
Peter Sloly	1	0	1984-11-02	Egypt	-	-	
Alex Smith	1	0	1925-06-27	United States	-	-	
**Justin Smith**	1	0	2026-10-03	Peru			
**Dayne St. Clair**	22	0	2021-06-05	Aruba			
Paul Stalteri	84	7	1997-08-17	Iran	2010-10-08	Ukraine	
Kyriakos Stamatopoulos	21	0	2001-11-14	Malta	2006-10-08	Jamaica	
**Daniel Stanese**	1	0	2015-01-19	Iceland			
Ostap Steckiw	1	1	1957-07-07	United States	-	-	
Jack Steele	3	0	1957-06-22	United States	1957-07-04	Mexico	
Gogie Stewart	4	2	1957-06-22	United States	1957-07-07	United States	
Matt Stinson	1	0	2013-01-29	United States	-	-	
Dick Stobbart	6	2	1924-06-07	Australia	1924-06-27	Australia	
Mike Stojanovic	14	5	1980-09-15	New Zealand	1981-11-21	Cuba	
David Stothard	4	0	1957-06-22	United States	1957-07-07	United States	
Adam Straith	43	0	2010-05-24	Argentina			
Gene Strenicer	9	0	1977-10-08	El Salvador	1980-11-01	United States	
**Frank Sturing**	2	1	2021-03-29	Cayman Islands			
Ive Sulentic	2	0	2004-01-18	Barbados	2005-11-16	Luxembourg	
Greg Sutton	19	0	2004-01-18	Barbados	2009-07-18	Honduras	
Mike Sweeney	61	1	1980-09-17	New Zealand	1993-08-15	Australia	
Gordon Sweetzer	3	0	1981-11-02	El Salvador	1981-11-15	Mexico	
**Ballou Tabla**	2	0	2018-10-18	Dominica			
Stan Tait	4	0	1927-06-25	New Zealand	1927-07-23	New Zealand	
Russell Teibert	26	2	2012-08-15	Trinidad and Tobago			
Elvis Thomas	3	0	1999-10-10	Haiti	2000-01-11	Bermuda	
Simon Thomas	8	0	2013-01-26	Denmark			
Gary Thompson	7	0	1976-09-24	United States	1977-10-22	Mexico	
Niall Thompson	9	2	1993-03-09	South Korea	2000-10-09	Panama	
Maxim Tissot	13	0	2015-01-16	Iceland			
Guido Tittoto	1	0	1989-04-12	Denmark	-	-	
Charlie Trafford	2	0	2015-10-13	Ghana			
Mason Trafford	1	0	2013-01-26	Denmark			
Chris Turner	4	0	1983-06-19	Scotland	1984-05-26	Italy	
Dave Turner	3	1	1927-07-02	New Zealand	1927-07-23	New Zealand	
Joe Turpin	1	0	1975-01-05	Cuba	-	-	
Bruce Twamley	8	1	1972-08-20	United States	1977-10-22	Mexico	
**Kris Twardek**	1	0	2017-10-08	El Salvador			
**Iké Ugbo**	9	0	2021-11-12	Costa Rica			
Carl Valentine	31	1	1985-09-14	Honduras	1993-08-15	Australia	
Tibor Vigh	4	2	1968-10-06	Bermuda	1968-10-27	United States	
**Steven Vitória**	46	5	2016-02-05	United States			
Igor Vrablic	35	12	1984-03-28	Haiti	1986-09-06	Singapore	
Joshua Wagenaar	4	0	2006-11-15	Hungary	2010-05-29	Venezuela	
Gordon Wallace	9	0	1973-10-07	Luxembourg	1980-11-11	Guatemala	
Massih Wassey	2	0	2010-01-31	Jamaica	2010-05-29	Venezuela	
**Joel Waterman**	19	0	2021-03-29	Cayman Islands			
Mark Watson	78	3	1991-03-16	United States	2004-10-13	Costa Rica	
Greg Weber	2	0	1973-08-05	United States	1973-10-07	Luxembourg	
Chris Williams	3	0	2003-01-18	United States	2008-11-19	Jamaica	
Fred Williams	1	0	1925-11-08	United States	-	-	
Richard L. Williams	3	0	1926-11-06	United States	1927-07-23	New Zealand	
Bruce Wilson	57	0	1974-04-12	Bermuda	1986-06-09	Soviet Union	
Jim Wilson	3	2	1924-06-14	Australia	1924-07-26	Australia	
**David Wotherspoon**	13	1	2018-03-24	New Zealand			
Davide Xausa	31	2	1999-04-27	Northern Ireland	2003-01-18	United States	
Frank Yallop	52	0	1990-05-13	Mexico	1997-11-16	Costa Rica	
Bill Young	4	0	1972-08-20	United States	1972-09-05	Mexico	
Gregor Young	1	0	1992-04-02	China	-	-	
Walt Zakaluznyi	2	0	1957-07-04	Mexico	1957-07-07	United States	
Sergio Zanatta	3	1	1968-10-06	Bermuda	1968-10-20	Bermuda	
**Dominick Zator**	3	0	2023-06-27	Guadeloupe			
Gianluca Zavarise	1	0	2010-05-29	Venezuela	-	-	

== Sources ==
- CanadaSoccer.com
- RSSSF data on Canadian players
