= 1987 Canadian Soccer League season =

Canadian Soccer League
- Season: 1987
- Champions: Calgary Kickers
- Division Leaders: Hamilton Steelers (East); Calgary Kickers (West)
- Matches: 80
- Goals: 212 (2.65 per match)
- Top goalscorer: (Canada) Nick Gilbert (10)

The 1987 Canadian Soccer League season was the first season of play for the Canadian Soccer League, a new Division 1 men's soccer league in the Canadian soccer pyramid.

== Format ==
The schedule was not a balanced schedule based on the league principle of playing each club home and away due to travel concerns. The league was divided into two four-team division with each team playing each team in their division four times, twice at home and twice on the road, and playing the teams in the opposing division twice, once at home and once on the road for a total of twenty games. Following the season, the top three teams in each division would advance to the playoffs, with the division leaders earning a first round bye, to designate a national champion club.

== Summary ==
The Canadian Soccer League was the second attempt to create a national professional league in Canada. Many teams were existing franchises from the non-professional provincial leagues, while others had come from semi-professional leagues, including Edmonton (Western Soccer Alliance), Hamilton (Canadian National Soccer League), and Toronto (CNSL and NASL), while some teams, such as the Vancouver 86ers were new. The league opened with a good start with sizable crowds and a fairly high level of play, but teams soon began to feel the financial pressure, particularly in the smaller markets.

The league's inaugural match took place on June 7, 1987 in Aylmer, Quebec between the National Capital Pioneers and the Hamilton Steelers and finished in a 1–1 draw, in a steady drizzle, in front 2,500 spectators.

The Eastern Division in 1987 consisted of National Capital Pioneers, Hamilton Steelers, Toronto Blizzard, and the North York Rockets. The Western Division comprised the Calgary Kickers, Edmonton Brick Men, Vancouver 86ers, and the Winnipeg Fury. Calgary and Hamilton won their divisions and both advanced to the finals in the playoffs. In the final, Calgary defeated Hamilton 2–1, at home, in a winner-take-all one game final.

== Regular season ==
=== East Division ===
Pos	Team	Pld	W	D	L	GF	GA	GD	Pts	Qualification
1	Hamilton Steelers	20	10	6	4	32	22	+10	26	Playoff semifinals
2	National Capital Pioneers	20	7	9	4	22	15	+7	23	Playoff quarterfinals
3	Toronto Blizzard	20	6	8	6	22	27	−5	20	Playoff quarterfinals
4	North York Rockets	20	1	7	12	15	39	−24	9	

Source: Canadian Soccer History Archives 1987 CSL Stats

=== West Division ===
Pos	Team	Pld	W	D	L	GF	GA	GD	Pts	Qualification
1	Calgary Kickers (O)	20	11	5	4	32	22	+10	27	Playoff semifinals
2	Vancouver 86ers	20	9	3	8	37	27	+10	21	Playoff quarterfinals
3	Edmonton Brick Men	20	7	6	7	27	24	+3	20	Playoff quarterfinals
4	Winnipeg Fury	20	5	4	11	25	36	−11	14	

Source: Canadian Soccer History Archives 1987 CSL Stats
(O) Play-off winners

=== Overall ===
Pos	Team	Pld	W	D	L	GF	GA	GD	Pts	Qualification
1	Calgary Kickers (O)	20	11	5	4	32	22	+10	27	Regular season winner
2	Hamilton Steelers	20	10	6	4	32	22	+10	26	
3	National Capital Pioneers	20	7	9	4	22	15	+7	23	
4	Vancouver 86ers	20	9	3	8	37	27	+10	21	
5	Edmonton Brick Men	20	7	6	7	27	24	+3	20	
6	Toronto Blizzard	20	6	8	6	22	27	−5	20	
7	Winnipeg Fury	20	5	4	11	25	36	−11	14	
8	North York Rockets	20	1	7	12	15	39	−24	9	

Source: Canadian Soccer History Archives 1987 CSL Stats
(O) Play-off winners

== Playoffs ==
Home team on top.

Quarter-finals
West
2W	Vancouver	2
3W	Edmonton	1
East
2E	Ottawa	1
3E	Toronto (OT)	2

Semi-finals
1W	Calgary (OT)	4
2W	Vancouver	3
1E	Hamilton	1
3E	Toronto	0

Final
1W	Calgary Kickers	2
1E	Hamilton Steelers	1

=== Quarterfinal ===
September 9, 1987	Vancouver 86ers	2–1	Edmonton Brick Men	Vancouver, British Columbia
19:30	Easton Jr. 48'; Mobilio 89'	[ Report]	Roy Viana 64'	Stadium: Swangard Stadium; Attendance: 3,942; Referee: John Meachin

September 10, 1987	National Capital Pioneers	1–2 (a.e.t.)	Toronto Blizzard	Aylmer, Quebec
	Fred Juett 40'	[ Report]	Luis Lufi 59'; Troy Andeh 112'	Stadium: Aydelu Park; Attendance: 1,100

=== Semifinal ===
September 12, 1987	Hamilton Steelers	1–0	Toronto Blizzard	Hamilton, Ontario
	Bunbury 80'	[ Report]		Stadium: Ivor Wynne Stadium; Attendance: 2,000

September 13, 1987	Calgary Kickers	4–3 (a.e.t.)	Vancouver 86ers	Calgary, Alberta
14:00	Kern 10', 69'; Gilbert 87', 97'	[ Report]	Easton Jr. 23'; Mobilio 58', 63'	Stadium: Mewata Stadium; Attendance: 1,683

=== Final ===
September 20, 1987	Calgary Kickers	2–1	Hamilton Steelers	Calgary, Alberta
15:00	Gilbert 12', 67'	[ Report]	Billy Domazetis 54'	Stadium: Mewata Stadium; Attendance: 5,617; Referee: Mario Perrino

== Statistics ==
=== Top scorers ===
Rank	Player	Club	Goals
1	(Canada) Nick Gilbert	Calgary Kickers	10
2	(Canada) Domenic Mobilio	Vancouver 86ers	9
3	(Socialist Federal Republic of Yugoslavia) Željko Adžić	Hamilton Steelers	8
4	(Canada) Norman Odinga	Edmonton Brick Men	7
4	(South Korea) Han Kim	Winnipeg Fury	7
4	(Canada) James Easton	Vancouver 86ers	7
7	(Scotland) Arnie Meers	Vancouver 86ers	6
7	(Canada) John Catliff	Calgary Kickers	6
7	(Fiji) Ivor Evans	Vancouver 86ers	6
7	(Canada) Billy Domazetis	Hamilton Steelers	6
11	(Canada) John Roumelis	National Capital Pioneers	5
11	(Canada) Ed McNally	National Capital Pioneers	5
11	(Canada) David Bryne	Toronto Blizzard	5

== Honours ==
The following awards and nominations were awarded for the 1987 season.

=== Most Valuable Player ===
Player	Team
(Canada) Nick Gilbert	Calgary Kickers

=== League All-Stars ===
Player	Position
(Canada) Sven Habermann (Calgary Strikers)	Goalkeeper
(Argentina) Diego Castello (Edmonton Brick Men)	Defender
(Canada) Greg Kern (Calgary Strikers)	Defender
(Canada) Paul James (Hamilton Steelers)	Defender
(Canada) Randy Ragan (Toronto Blizzard)	Defender
(Socialist Federal Republic of Yugoslavia) Željko Adžić (Hamilton Steelers)	Midfielder
(England) Ray Hudson (Edmonton Brick Men)	Midfielder
(Canada) James Easton (Vancouver 86ers)	Midfielder
(Canada) Ed McNally (National Capital Pioneers)	Forward
(Canada) Billy Domazetis (Hamilton Steelers)	Forward
(Canada) Nick Gilbert (Calgary Strikers)	Forward

Reserves

Player	Position
(Canada) Don Ferguson (National Capital Pioneers)	Goalkeeper
(Canada) David Norman (Winnipeg Fury)	Defender
(South Korea) Han Kim (Winnipeg Fury)	Midfielder
(Hungary) Zoltan Metzaros (North York Rockets)	Forward

Front office

Person	Role
(Canada) Bill Thompson (National Capital Pioneers)	Head Coach
(Canada) Peter Welsh (Calgary Kickers)	Assistant Coach
(Canada) Buzz Parsons (Vancouver 86ers)	General Manager

== Average home attendances ==
Pos.	Team	GP	Average Attendance
1	Vancouver 86ers	20	5,977
2	Winnipeg Fury	20	4,023
3	Edmonton Brick Men	20	3,491
4	Calgary Strikers	20	2,949
5	National Capital Pioneers	20	2,122
6	Hamilton Steelers	20	2,032
7	Toronto Blizzard	20	1,814
8	North York Rockets	20	1,275
Total Attendance		160	2,817

== See also ==
- Canadian Professional Soccer League (1983) – previous season of D1 soccer in Canada
