= Victoria Riptides =

- Full name: Victoria Riptides
- Nickname: 'Tides
- Founded: May 3, 1984
- Dissolved: November 6, 1985; 39 years ago
- Stadium: Royal Athletic Park
- Capacity: 3,800
- Chairman: Dave Davies (1984); Harry Kuiack (1985)
- Manager: David Keith (1984); Brian Hughes & Buzz Parsons (1985)
- League: PCSL (1984); WSA (1985)

Victoria Riptides (also known as the RipTides and Riptide) were a professional soccer team based out of Victoria, British Columbia. The team played for two seasons; the 1984 season of the Pacific Coast Soccer League, and 1985 season of the Western Alliance Challenge Series. Their home games were played at Royal Athletic Park.

== History ==
David Keith was coach of the Riptides for their first season during which the Riptides secured a record of 7 wins, 2 draws, and 1 loss. The team featured several prominent players including former Vancouver Whitecap, Frank Woods; Simon Keith, who joined the 'Tides after playing in the second tier of the British league for Millwall F.C.; Brian Mousley (Portland Timbers); local stand-out Rob Wallace who signed his first professional contract with the Riptides; as well as several Canada national team pool players: Doug Adlem, Glen Johnson and Scott Weinberg (University of Victoria).

In 1985, four independent west coast soccer clubs joined to create an informal challenge series. The challenge cup pitted the Riptides against F.C. Seattle, F.C. Portland and the San Jose Earthquakes in a home and away series. The cup also included games against the Canada national soccer team which was training for the 1986 World Cup in Vancouver, BC. The national team was not included in the standings.

Brian Hughes was the head coach to start the 1985 season, but was replaced mid-season by real-estate agent Buzz Parsons who also failed to produce winning results. The 1985 Riptides had a 3-1-3 record, finishing second from the bottom in the final standings. The challenge series led to a discussion among the four teams about forming a permanent league or alliance. The Riptides management at the time, disagreed with this approach and did not participate in future games in what became known as the Western Soccer Alliance. They also backed out of joining the newly forming Canadian Soccer Association. The Western Soccer Alliance became the Western Soccer League in 1989 which merged with the American Soccer League in 1990 to form the American Professional Soccer League.

== Year-by-year ==
Year	League	Record	Regular season	Postseason
1984	Pacific Coast Soccer League	7-2-1	2nd	runners-up
1985	Western Alliance Challenge Series	3-1-3	3rd	N/A

== 1984 Pacific Coast Soccer League ==
=== League final standings ===
GP = Games Played, W = Wins, T = Ties, L = Losses, GF = Goals For, GA = Goals Against, Pts= point system

2 points for a win, 1 point for a draw, 0 points for a loss.

-League Premiers (most points). -Other playoff teams.

Team	GP	W	T	L	GF	GA	Pts
New Westminster QPR	10	8	1	1	28	12	17
Victoria Riptides	10	7	2	1	25	8	16
Nanaimo Regal	10	4	3	3	22	13	11
Richmond Olympic	10	1	4	5	13	35	6
Vancouver Pegasus	10	1	4	5	8	17	6
Richmond Club Ireland	10	0	4	6	10	27	4

=== Regular season results ===
Date	Opponent	Venue	Result	Attendance	Goal Scorers	Ref.
June 10, 1984	New Westminster QPR	H	2–3	937	George Pakos, Simon Keith	
June 17, 1984	Vancouver Pegasus	H	3–0	907	John Hughes, Simon Keith, Brain Mousley	
June 24, 1984	Richmond Club Ireland	A	0–1		Glenn Johnston	
June 30, 1984	Nanaimo Regal	H	4–0	100	Ken Garraway (2), Rob Wallace, Mike Collis	
July 7, 1984	Richmond Olympic	H	4–1	982	Simon Keith (2), Doug Adlem, Ken Garraway	
July 14, 1984	New Westminster QPR	A	1–2		Scott Weinberg, Glenn Johnston	
July 22, 1984	Nanaimo Regal	H	1–1	700	Scott Weinberg	
July 29, 1984	Vancouver Pegasus	A	2–2		Glenn Johnston, Brain Mousley	
August 6, 1984	Richmond Club Ireland	H	3–0	600	Ian Klitze (2), Glenn Johnston	
August 12, 1984	Richmond Olympic	A	0–2		Ken Garraway, Doug Adlem	

=== Victoria Cup Final results ===
Date	Opponent	Venue	Result	Attendance	Goal Scorers	Ref.
August 23, 1984	New Westminster QPR	A	6–2		George Pakos, Ken Garraway	
August 26, 1984	New Westminster QPR	H	3–0	907	George Pakos, Doug Adlem, Glenn Johnston	

=== Exhibition results ===
Date	Opponent	Venue	Result	Attendance	Goal Scorers	Ref.
July 17, 1984	Canada Men's National Team	H	0–4	1,105	none	

=== Team management ===
- (Canada) Joe Stott - president
- (Canada) Dave Davies - general manager
- (Canada) David Keith - head coach

== 1985 Western Alliance Challenge Series ==
=== Series final standings ===
Pos	Team	Pld	W	T	L	GF	GA	GD	Pts
1	San Jose Earthquakes	7	4	1	2	10	9	+1	13
2	F.C. Seattle	7	3	1	3	16	11	+5	10
3	Victoria Riptide	7	3	1	3	12	13	−1	10
4	F.C. Portland	7	1	2	4	8	15	−7	5

=== Results by round ===
June 15, 1985 WACS 1	Victoria Riptide	3–2	FC Portland	Victoria, British Columbia
14:00	John Noble 45+', 83'; Ken Andrews 78'	Report	Tim Newton 33'; Brent Goulet 65'	Stadium: Royal Athletic Park; Attendance: 200

July 6, 1985 WACS 2	Victoria Riptide	0–1	San Jose Earthquakes	Victoria, British Columbia
14:00		Report	John Catliff 76' (o.g.)	Stadium: Royal Athletic Park; Attendance: 600

July 13, 1985 WACS 3	Victoria Riptide	4–2	FC Seattle	Victoria, British Columbia
14:00	George Pakos 33', Nick Gilbert 38'; Ken Garraway 49'	Report	Bruce Raney; Brian Schmetzer 85'	Stadium: Royal Athletic Park; Attendance: 450

July 20, 1985 WACS 4	Victoria Riptide	2–1	FC Portland	Victoria, British Columbia
14:00	Ken Garraway 16'; Greg Kern 67' (pen.)	Report	Brent Goulet 37'	Stadium: Royal Athletic Park; Attendance: 400

July 28, 1985 WACS 5	Victoria Riptide	2–2	Canada	Victoria, British Columbia
14:00	Ian Baird 65'; Carey Cleaver 75'	Report	John Catliff 3'; Greg Ion 83'	Stadium: Royal Athletic Park; Attendance: 600

August 9, 1985 WACS 6	FC Seattle	3–0	Victoria Riptide	Seattle, Washington
19:30	Bruce Raney 9'; Robbie Zipp 18'; Brian Schmetzer 34'	Report 1 Report 2		Stadium: Memorial Stadium; Attendance: 1,628

August 17, 1985 WACS 7	San Jose Earthquakes	2–1	Victoria Riptide	San Jose, California
19:30	Fred Hamel 13' (Dangerfield); Carlos Morales (red card) 76'; Chris Dangerfield 85'	Report 1 Report 2	Lou Garraway 21' (McGuire, Hood)	Stadium: Spartan Stadium; Attendance: 3,489

=== Exhibition match results ===
May 26, 1985 friendly	Upper Island Selects	1–2	Victoria Riptide	Nanaimo, British Columbia
	Tony Leach 44'	Report	Ken Andrews 35'; Tony Ensons 85' (pen.)	Stadium: Caledonian Park

May 29, 1985 friendly	Victoria Riptide	2–1	Upper Island Selects	Victoria, British Columbia
	Nick Gilbert 21'; Tony Ensons 86' (pen.)	Report	Doug Muirhead 46'	Stadium: Royal Athletic Park; Attendance: 150

June 2, 1985 friendly	Victoria Riptide	3–2	Mean Green (Dallas, TX)	Victoria, British Columbia
17:00	Jamie Lowery 20'; Ken Andrews 30'; Greg Kern	Report	Manny Servantes; David Easterly 75'	Stadium: Royal Athletic Park; Attendance: 300

June 21, 1985 friendly	Victoria Riptide	1–3	Edmonton Brick Men	Victoria, British Columbia
19:30	David McGill 24' (o.g.)	Report	Carlos Marquez 4', 54', 67'	Stadium: Royal Athletic Park; Attendance: 400

July 21, 1985 friendly	Edmonton Brick Men	5–0	Victoria Riptide	Edmonton, Alberta
16:00	Peter Stepaniak; Ross Ongaro; Carlos Marquez; Norm Odinga; Victoria 90' (o.g.)	Report A Report B		Stadium: Clarke Stadium; Attendance: 967

August 24, 1985 friendly	Victoria Riptide	1–2	PCL All-Stars	Victoria, British Columbia
	Lou Garraway 12'	Report	John Connor 8'; Rick Douglas 45' (pen.)	Stadium: Royal Athletic Park; Attendance: 400; Referee: Graham Cope

=== 1985 Roster ===
Note: Flags indicate national team as defined under FIFA eligibility rules; some limited exceptions apply. Players may hold more than one non-FIFA nationality.

No.	Pos.	Nation	Player
—	GK	CAN	Grant Darley
—	GK	CAN	Sven Habermann
—	GK		Gary Smith
—	GK		Tobin Walker
—	DF	CAN	Randy Samuel
—	DF	CAN	Iain Baird
—	DF	CAN	Greg Kern
—	DF	CAN	Carey Cleaver
—	DF	CAN	Dan Sudeyko
—	DF	WAL	John Hughes
—	DF		Ken Andrews
—	DF		John Noble
—	DF		Gordie Horth
—	MF	CAN	Jamie Lowery
—	MF	CAN	John Catliff

No.	Pos.	Nation	Player
—	MF	CAN	George Pakos
—	MF		John McGuire
—	FW	CAN	Doug Muirhead
—	FW	CAN	Nick Gilbert
—	FW	CAN	Ken Garraway
—	FW	CAN	Lou Garraway
—	FW		Lance Hollett
—		CAN	Buzz Parsons
—		CAN	Keith Bridge
—		CAN	Steve Moss
—			Tony Ensons
—			Demetre Gilbert
—			Mike McStravich
—			Dan Hood

=== Team management ===
- (Canada) Harry Kuiack - president
- (Canada) Drew Finerty - general manager
- (Canada) Brian Hughes - head coach
- (Canada) Bruce Twamley - assistant coach
- (Canada) Buzz Parsons - assistant coach, (became head coach in June)

== See also ==
- Seattle Storm (soccer)
- Portland Timbers (1985–1990)
- Victoria Vistas (1989–1990)
