= 1988 Canadian Soccer League season =

Canadian Soccer League
- Season: 1988
- Champions: Vancouver 86ers
- Division Leaders: Hamilton Steelers (East); Vancouver 86ers (West)
- Matches: 126
- Goals: 405 (3.21 per match)
- Top goalscorer: (Canada) John Catliff (22)

The 1988 Canadian Soccer League season was the second season of play for the Canadian Soccer League, a Division 1 men's soccer league in the Canadian soccer pyramid.

== Format and changes from previous season ==
Montreal Supra joined the league as an expansion franchise, entering the East Division.

The National Capitals Pioneers went bankrupt in their inaugural season, but the club was re-structured and renamed as the Ottawa Intrepid. They also moved their home stadium to Ottawa, after playing the previous year in Aylmer, Quebec

Similar to the previous season, the teams played an unbalanced schedule with two-thirds of a team's matches coming against teams in their own division. Following the season, the top three teams in each division would advance to the playoffs, with the division leaders earning a first round bye, to designate a national champion club.

== Regular season ==
=== East Division ===
Pos	Team	Pld	W	D	L	GF	GA	GD	Pts	Qualification
1	Hamilton Steelers	28	18	6	4	64	28	+36	42	Playoff semifinals
2	Toronto Blizzard	28	8	13	7	44	31	+13	29	Playoff quarterfinals
3	North York Rockets	28	10	8	10	40	39	+1	28	Playoff quarterfinals
4	Ottawa Intrepid	28	8	9	11	32	43	−11	25	
5	Montreal Supra	28	8	8	12	36	44	−8	24	

Source: Canadian Soccer History Archives 1988 CSL Stats

=== West Division ===
Pos	Team	Pld	W	D	L	GF	GA	GD	Pts	Qualification
1	Vancouver 86ers (O)	28	21	6	1	84	30	+54	48	Playoff semifinals
2	Winnipeg Fury	28	9	7	12	33	46	−13	25	Playoff quarterfinals
3	Calgary Kickers	28	6	6	16	39	70	−31	18	Playoff quarterfinals
4	Edmonton Brick Men	28	4	5	19	33	74	−41	13	

Source: Canadian Soccer History Archives 1988 CSL Stats
(O) Play-off winners

== Playoffs ==
Quarter-finals
West
2W	Winnipeg Fury (a.e.t.)	2
3W	Calgary Kickers	1
East
2E	Toronto Blizzard	2
3E	North York Rockets	1

Semi-finals
1W	Vancouver 86ers	3
2W	Winnipeg Fury	1
1E	Hamilton Steelers	1
3E	Toronto Blizzard	0

Final
1W	Vancouver 86ers	4
1E	Hamilton Steelers	1

=== Quarterfinal ===
September 14, 1988	Toronto Blizzard	2–1	North York Rockets	Toronto, Ontario
	Gilbert 78'; Šegota 86'	[ Report]	John Coyle	Stadium: Varsity Stadium; Attendance: 3,179

September 15, 1988	Winnipeg Fury	2–1 (a.e.t.)	Calgary Kickers	Winnipeg, Manitoba
19:30	Cambridge 17'; Wade Gibson 119'	[ Report]	Phillips 44'	Stadium: Winnipeg Stadium; Attendance: 3,606

=== Semifinal ===
September 17, 1988	Hamilton Steelers	1–0	Toronto Blizzard	Hamilton, Ontario
13:00	Bunbury 13'	[ Report]		Stadium: Brian Timmis Stadium; Attendance: 2,102

September 18, 1988	Vancouver 86ers	3–1	Winnipeg Fury	Vancouver, British Columbia
16:00	Mobilio 10', 59'; Mitchell 86'	[ Report]	Doug Leeis 29'	Stadium: Swangard Stadium; Attendance: 4,226

=== Final ===
September 25, 1988	Vancouver 86ers	4–1	Hamilton Steelers	Vancouver, British Columbia
13:00	Valentine 9'; Ion 18'; Catliff 21'; Mitchell 76'	[ Report]	Gasparini 52'	Stadium: Swangard Stadium; Attendance: 6,443; Referee: Gord Arrowsmith

== Statistics ==
=== Top scorers ===
Rank	Player	Club	Goals
1	(Canada) John Catliff	Vancouver 86ers	22
2	(Canada) Domenic Mobilio	Vancouver 86ers	20
3	(Argentina) Amadeo Gasparini	North York Rockets / Hamilton Steelers	18
4	(Socialist Federal Republic of Yugoslavia) Željko Adžić	Hamilton Steelers	14
5	(Canada) Eddy Berdusco	North York Rockets	12
6	(Canada) Nick Gilbert	Toronto Blizzard / Calgary Kickers	11
6	(Canada) Geoff Aunger	Winnipeg Fury	11
8	(Canada) Arthur Calixte	Montreal Supra	10
8	(England) John Rich	Calgary Kickers	10
8	(Canada) Dallas Moen	Ottawa Intrepid	10
8	(Canada) Dale Mitchell	Vancouver 86ers	10
12	(Canada) Alex Bunbury	Hamilton Steelers	9
12	(Fiji) Ivor Evans	Vancouver 86ers	9
12	(Canada) Lucio Ianiero	Hamilton Steelers	9

== Honours ==
The following awards and nominations were awarded for the 1988 season.

=== Most Valuable Player ===
Player	Team
(Canada) John Catliff	Vancouver 86ers

=== League All-Stars ===
Player	Position
(Canada) Paul Dolan (Vancouver 86ers)	Goalkeeper
(Argentina) Diego Castello (Toronto Blizzard)	Defender
(Canada) Burke Kaiser (Calgary Strikers)	Defender
(Canada) Bob Lenarduzzi (Vancouver 86ers)	Defender
(Canada) Paul James (Hamilton Steelers)	Defender
(Canada) Gerry Gray (Ottawa Intrepid)	Midfielder
(Canada) Lyndon Hooper (Montreal Supra)	Midfielder
(Canada) Mike Sweeney (Toronto Blizzard)	Midfielder
(Canada) John Catliff (Vancouver 86ers)	Forward
(Argentina) Amadeo Gasparini (Hamilton Steelers)	Forward
(Canada) Domenic Mobilio (Vancouver 86ers)	Forward

Reserves

Player	Position
(Canada) Pat Harrington (Toronto Blizzard)	Goalkeeper
(Canada) Peter Sarantopoulos (North York Rockets)	Defender
(Croatia) Željko Adžić (Winnipeg Fury)	Midfielder
(Canada) Alex Bunbury (Hamilton Steelers)	Forward

Front office

Person	Role
(Canada) Bob Lenarduzzi (Vancouver 86ers)	Head Coach
(Canada) Alan Errington (Vancouver 86ers)	Assistant Coach
(Canada) John McGrane (Hamilton Steelers)	General Manager

== Average home attendances ==
Pos.	Team	GP	Average Attendance
1	Vancouver 86ers	28	4,919
2	Winnipeg Fury	28	3,207
3	Montreal Supra	28	2,993
4	Toronto Blizzard	28	2,757
5	Hamilton Steelers	28	2,750
6	Edmonton Brick Men	28	2,638
7	Calgary Kickers	28	2,387
8	North York Rockets	28	1,655
9	Ottawa Intrepid	28	1,546
Total Attendance		252	2,761
