= Doug McKinty =

Canadian soccer player

Personal information
- Date of birth: July 1, 1968 (age 58)
- Place of birth: Nanaimo, British Columbia, Canada
- Position: Defender

Senior career*
Years	Team	Apps	(Gls)
1987–1995	Vancouver 86ers	47+	(5+)

International career
1986–1987	Canada U-20	5	(0)
1992	Canada	1	(0)
- * Club domestic league appearances and goals

Doug McKinty is a Canadian retired soccer defender who played professionally with the Vancouver 86ers and earned one cap with the Canada men's national soccer team.

== Club career ==
In 1987, McKinty joined the newly established Vancouver 86ers in the Canadian Soccer League. From 1988 to 1991, Vancouver dominated the CSL, winning four consecutive league championships. When the CSL collapsed following the 1992 season, McKinty and his teammates moved to the American Professional Soccer League. McKinty remained with Vancouver until at least 1995.

== International career ==
In 1986 and 1987, McKinty earned five caps with the Canadian U-20 national team as it qualified for the 1987 FIFA World Youth Championship. He did not enter any of the Canadian games in that tournament.

McKinty also represented Canada at the 1987 Pan American Games. On April 2, 1992, McKinty earned his lone cap with the Canada national team in a 5–2 win over China.
