= Doug Muirhead =

Canadian soccer player

Personal information
- Full name: Douglas Muirhead
- Date of birth: March 20, 1962 (age 64)
- Place of birth: Canada
- Position: Striker

Senior career*
Years	Team	Apps	(Gls)
1989–1997	Vancouver 86ers	233	(34)
1991	Toronto Blizzard	10	(2)

International career^{‡}
1989–1992	Canada	6	(1)
Medal record
Representing Canada
Men's Association football
North American Nations Cup
Winner	1990 Canada
Third place	1991 United States
- * Club domestic league appearances and goals as of 27 June 2009 ‡ National team caps and goals as of 27 June 2009

Doug Muirhead (born 20 March 1962) is a Canadian former soccer player who played for the national team from 1989 to 1992.

== Club career ==
Muirhead played for Canadian Soccer League outfit Vancouver 86ers, for whom he also played in the A-League. He spent a year with the Toronto Blizzard in 1991.

== International career ==
A striker, Muirhead made his debut for Canada in an April 1989 friendly match against Denmark, He earned a total of 6 caps, scoring 1 goal.

His final international game was an April 1992 friendly match against China, in which he scored his only international goal.

He also represented Canada at the inaugural 1989 FIFA Futsal World Championship in the Netherlands.

=== International goals ===
Scores and results list Canada's goal tally first.

#	Date	Venue	Opponent	Score	Result	Competition
1	2 April 1992	Royal Athletic Park, Victoria, Canada	China		5–2	Friendly match

== Honours ==
Canada

- North American Nations Cup: 1990; 3rd place, 1991
