= David Phillips (soccer) =

Canadian soccer player

Personal information
- Date of birth: 25 May 1966 (age 60)
- Position: Striker

College career
Years	Team	Apps	(Gls)
1986–1990	Alberta Golden Bears		(23)

Senior career*
Years	Team	Apps	(Gls)
1986	Edmonton Brick Men		
1987–1988	Calgary Kickers	25	(3)
1989	Edmonton Brick Men	0	(0)
Total		25	(3)

International career
1984–1985	Canada U20	10	(4)
1984	Canada	2	(0)
- * Club domestic league appearances and goals

David Phillips (born 25 May 1966) is a Canadian former international soccer player who played as a striker.

== University career ==
Phillips attended the University of Alberta, playing for the Alberta Golden Bears from 1986 to 1990, where he set the school record for goals with 23, holding the record until 2011 when it was broken by Brett Colvin.

== Club career ==
In 1986, he played for the Edmonton Brick Men in the Western Soccer Alliance.

Phillips played in the Canadian Soccer League with Calgary Kickers in 1987, making two appearances in the playoffs. He re-signed with Calgary for the 1988 season, scoring three goals in 25 regular season matches, and scoring once in one playoff match.

He returned to the Brick Men in 1989, but did not make any appearances.

== International career ==
Phillips made his Canada U20 debut on August 20, 1984, against Guatemala at the 1984 CONCACAF U-20 Tournament. He scored his first goal on August 24 against Cuba and also scored in the tournament final against Mexico in a 2–1 loss.

He made his senior team debut on October 21, 1984, in a friendly against Tunisia.
