= Buzz Parsons =

Canadian soccer player (born 1950)

Personal information
- Full name: Leslie Parsons
- Date of birth: 16 December 1950 (age 75)
- Place of birth: Burnaby, British Columbia, Canada
- Height: 1.75 m (5 ft 9 in)
- Position: Midfielder

Youth career
- Huddersfield Town
- Ipswich Town

College career
Years	Team	Apps	(Gls)
1975	Simon Fraser	20	(21)

Senior career*
Years	Team	Apps	(Gls)
1969–1970	Vancouver Spartans		
1971	Vancouver Eintracht		
1976–1982	Vancouver Whitecaps	106	(17)
1979–1980	→ L.A. Aztecs (indoor)	6	(0)
1980–1981	→ Vancouver Whitecaps (indoor)	8	(2)
1985	Victoria Riptides		
Total		120	(19)

International career
1972–1980	Canada	22	(6)

Managerial career
- Vancouver 86ers
- * Club domestic league appearances and goals

Les "Buzz" Parsons (born 16 December 1950) is a Canadian former soccer player who played at both professional and international levels as a midfielder. During his career in North America with the Vancouver Whitecaps, Parsons was affectionately known as "White Shoes", owing to the white boots he wore. After retiring as a player, Parsons later became a professional soccer coach.

== Career ==
=== Club career ===
Parsons played youth football in England with Huddersfield Town and Ipswich Town, but he never made a senior league appearance for either team. Parsons returned to Canada to play with the Vancouver Spartans and Vancouver Eintracht, winning the Challenge Cup with Eintracht in 1971. He also played with Vancouver Italia (Columbus FC) in 1972–1974. He spent one year (1975) studying and playing at Simon Fraser University, netting 21 goals.

Parsons later played in the North American Soccer League for the Vancouver Whitecaps between 1976 and 1982, scoring 17 goals in 106 appearances. Parsons started at right back in the 1979 NASL championship game that the Whitecaps won 2–1. Parsons also played indoor soccer during this period for the Los Angeles Aztecs and the Whitecaps.

=== International career ===
Between 1972 and 1980, Parsons represented Canada on 22 occasions, scoring 6 goals in the process. He also represented Canada at the 1971 Pan American Games.

=== International goals ===
Scores and results list Canada's goal tally first.

#	Date	Venue	Opponent	Score	Result	Competition
1	20 August 1972	King George V Park, St. John's, Canada	United States	1–0	3–2	1974 FIFA World Cup qualification
2	10 November 1973	Stade Sylvio Cator, Port-au-Prince, Haiti	Haiti	1–4	1–5	Friendly match
3	10 October 1976	Empire Stadium, Vancouver, Canada	Mexico	1–0	1–0	1978 FIFA World Cup qualification
4	12 October 1977	Estadio Azteca, Mexico City, Mexico	Suriname	1–0	2–1	1978 FIFA World Cup qualification
5	16 October 1977	Estadio Azteca, Mexico City, Mexico	Guatemala	1–0	2–1	1978 FIFA World Cup qualification
6	22 October 1977	Estadio Universitario, Monterrey, Mexico	Mexico	1–0	1–3	1978 FIFA World Cup qualification

=== Coaching career ===
Parsons was manager of the Vancouver 86ers and then the Victoria Vistas of the Canadian Soccer League.

== Personal life ==
Parsons was born in Burnaby, British Columbia.

In 2003 Parsons was inducted into the Canadian Soccer Hall of Fame.

Parsons now lives in Victoria, B.C., playing Over 50's soccer at Gorge Soccer Association
