= Chris Chueden =

Canadian retired soccer player

Personal information
- Full name: Christopher Hoyer Chueden
- Date of birth: 18 February 1961 (age 65)
- Place of birth: British Columbia, Canada
- Position: Striker

Senior career*
Years	Team	Apps	(Gls)
1981–1982	Montreal Manic	16	(1)
1981–1982	Montreal Manic (indoor)	11	(2)
1983	San Diego Sockers		
1985–1986	Cleveland Force (indoor)	44	(24)
1987–1988	Los Angeles Lazers (indoor)	74	(40)
1988	Edmonton Brick Men	5	(0)
1988–1989	San Diego Sockers (indoor)	38	(9)

International career
1979	Canada U20	4	(0)
1986	Canada	6	(1)
- * Club domestic league appearances and goals

Christopher Hoyer Chueden (born 18 February 1961 in British Columbia) is a Canadian retired soccer player who earned six caps for the national team in 1986, scoring one goal in the process.

In 1979, Chueden was on the Canadian U-20 team at the 1979 FIFA World Youth Championship.

Chueden played three seasons in the North American Soccer League, two with the Montreal Manic and one with the San Diego Sockers. In 1985, Chueden signed with the Cleveland Force of the Major Indoor Soccer League. On 6 March 1987, the Force traded Chueden to the Los Angeles Lazers in exchange for Paul Kitson. He spent one season in the Canadian Soccer League playing for the Edmonton Brick Men. Chueden then returned to the Sockers, who at that point were playing indoor in the MISL. There he played for one season, 1988–1989.

Chueden, together with three other Canadian players (Igor Vrablic, Hector Marinaro and David Norman), was involved in a match fixing betting scandal at the 1986 Merlion Cup tournament in Singapore. He never played for Canada again.
