= Gregor Young =

Canadian soccer player and coach

Greg Young
Personal information
- Full name: Gregor Young
- Date of birth: 8 February 1966 (age 60)

Team information
- Current team: Coastal WFC U-13 Girls (Head Coach)

Youth career
- UBC Thunderbirds

Senior career*
Years	Team	Apps	(Gls)
1988	Edmonton Brick Men	18	(0)
1989	Calgary Strikers	11	(1)
1989-1992	Vancouver 86ers	36	(3)

International career
1984–1985	Canada U20	6	(0)
1992	Canada	1	(0)

Managerial career
- 1999–2007: Kerrisdale Soccer Club (Technical Director)
- 2008: Vancouver Whitecaps
- 2009–: Coastal WFC U-13 Girls
- * Club domestic league appearances and goals

Gregor Young (born 8 February 1966) is a Canadian soccer coach and former professional player.

== International career ==
Young was part of the Canada team that played at the 1985 FIFA World Youth Championship.

He made his senior debut for Canada in an April 1992 friendly match against China. The game remained his only one ever for the senior team aside from a B International against South Korea, also for the men's national team.

== Coaching career ==
He coached five years for Coastal WFC, and was also the Technical Director of Vancouver United FC. He then became Executive Director of Vancouver United FC.
