= Calgary Kickers =

Former soccer team in Alberta, Canada

Calgary Kickers (1987–88) Calgary Strikers (1989)
- Founded: 1987 (Calgary Kickers); 1989 (Calgary Strikers)
- Dissolved: 1988 (Calgary Kickers); 1989 (Calgary Strikers)
- Stadium: Mewata Stadium; Calgary, Alberta
- Capacity: 10,000
- League: Canadian Soccer League

The Calgary Strikers (formerly the Calgary Kickers) were a Canadian soccer team in Calgary, Alberta, that competed in the Canadian Soccer League from 1987 to 1989. They were founded as the Calgary Kickers for the 1987 and 1988 seasons, winning the first league championship in 1987. In 1989, they became the Calgary Strikers, following which the club folded. Their home stadium was Mewata Stadium.

== History ==
The Kickers' genesis was a team formed in 1953 and represented Alberta inter-provincially several times including winning the 1974 Challenge Trophy and held exhibition matches against professional sides such as Edmonton Drillers.

The Kickers joined the Canadian Soccer League as one of the inaugural franchises for the 1987 season. Prior to the 1987 season, the Kickers had sold more than 2,000 season tickets. They opened their first preseason against English club Sheffield Wednesday. They were sometimes known as the Metro Ford Kickers or Calgary Metro Ford Kickers, after the name of their team sponsor.

During the league's first season, Calgary finished with an 11–5–4 record to finish first in their division and the league, earning a bye in the first round of the playoffs. In the playoffs, they defeated the Vancouver 86ers 4–3 in extra time, advancing to the finals where they defeated Hamilton to win the inaugural Mita Cup title. Nick Gilbert of the Kickers was the league's leading goal scorer and was named league Most Valuable Player.

The Kickers' second season was less successful, falling to a 6–6–13 record, finishing third in the West division. In the first round of the playoffs, Calgary was defeated by the Winnipeg Fury. In 1988, Calgary also played each of the U.S. based Western Soccer Alliance teams, with these games counting in the WSA standings, even though Calgary was not a member of that league, but not counting towards the CSL standings. The team went through tremendous financial difficulty during the season, which included them trading 1987 league MVP Nick Gilbert to the Toronto Blizzard in exchange for a draft pick and cash. Following the 1988 season the team folded and the players were dispersed via a draft, as the Kickers succumbed to their financial problems.

In 1989, a new community owned team named the Calgary Strikers was founded to replace the Kickers. However, the team did not fare much better than their predecessors, playing to crowds of under a thousand people, and in July made a public appeal for 700 supporters to each contribute $200 to keep the club afloat financially, in order to complete the 1989 season. The club managed to finish the season, although they had stopped paying their players and remaining staff in August. By September, injuries and player availability due to the financial situation affected the team's results especially the final away game in which only twelve players traveled to the match. The team managed to finish third in the West Division, qualifying for the playoffs, where they were defeated by Edmonton in the first round. Following the season, the club folded, despite a private individual who was rumored to be interested in operating the team in 1990 and who had fronted money for the community-owned team to be able to travel for the playoffs.

== Seasons ==
as Calgary Kickers

Season	League	Record	Rank	Playoffs	Ref
1987	Canadian Soccer League	11–5–4	1st, West	Champions	
1988	Canadian Soccer League	6–6–16	3rd, West	Quarter-finals	

as Calgary Strikers

Season	League	Record	Rank	Playoffs	Ref
1989	Canadian Soccer League	8–3–15	3rd, West	Did not qualify	

== Notable players ==
- (England) Len Cantello
- (Canada) John Catliff
- (Canada) Barry Deardon
- (Canada) Nick Gilbert
- (Canada) Sven Habermann
- (Canada) Greg Kern
- (United States) Neil Megson
- (Canada) David Norman
- (Canada) David Phillips
- (Scotland) Andy Smith
- (Republic of Ireland) Joe Waters
- (Canada) Gregor Young

Preceded by 1983 Edmonton Eagles	League Champions of Canada; 1987 (first title)	Succeeded by 1988 Vancouver 86ers
