= Luis Mosquera (footballer, born 1959) =

Chilean footballer

Personal information
- Full name: Luis Alberto Mosquera Rivera
- Date of birth: 3 October 1959 (age 67)
- Place of birth: Coquimbo, Chile
- Position: Defender

Senior career*
Years	Team	Apps	(Gls)
1977–1984	Universidad de Chile	219	(6)
1985	Audax Italiano	36	(0)
1986–1988	Universidad de Chile	109	(12)
1988–1989	Monterrey	27	(1)
1990	Edmonton Brick Men	7	(0)

International career
1983	Chile	1	(0)
1984	Chile Olympic	4	(0)
- * Club domestic league appearances and goals

Luis Alberto Mosquera Rivera (born 3 October 1959) is a Chilean former footballer. A defender, played for Universidad de Chile, Audax Italiano, C.F. Monterrey, and the Edmonton Brick Men and also represented Chile.
