= Nick Gilbert =

Canadian soccer player (born 1965)

Personal information
- Full name: Nicholas Michael Gilbert
- Date of birth: 20 July 1965 (age 61)
- Place of birth: Vancouver, British Columbia, Canada
- Position: Striker

Senior career*
Years	Team	Apps	(Gls)
1985	Victoria Riptides		
1987–1988	Calgary Kickers	34	(17)
1988	Toronto Blizzard	9	(5)
1989	Calgary Strikers	13	(8)
1990	Edmonton Brick Men	26	(5)
1991	Winnipeg Fury	7	(1)
1991	Hamilton Steelers	0	(0)
1993	Vancouver 86ers	4	(1)
?–2002	Victoria United		
2000–2001	Victoria Athletic Association		
2002–?	Seattle Hibernian Saints		

International career
1984	Canada U20	2	(0)
1988–1992	Canada	12	(1)
Medal record
Representing Canada
Men's Association football
North American Nations Cup
Winner	1990 Canada
Third place	1991 United States
- * Club domestic league appearances and goals

Nicholas Michael Gilbert (born 20 July 1965) is a former Canadian Soccer League high-scoring soccer striker and Canada men's national soccer team member.

== Club career ==
His first semi-professional experience came as a member of the Victoria Riptides. Gilbert was the Canadian Soccer League's inaugural Most Valuable Player selection as he led the league in goals in 1987 as a member of the Calgary Kickers, with 10. He was the 6th leading goal scoring in 1988 with 11 as he split time between Calgary and the Toronto Blizzard. In the league's 7-year existence Gilbert was its 7th all-time highest goal scorer with 36. Gilbert played four games for the Vancouver 86ers in 1993, all starts, and scored a goal, on 30 July in a 2–1 win over the Montreal Impact.

Gilbert was a long-time member of Victoria United of the Pacific Coast Soccer League. He finished tied for third in the league's 2000 goal scoring leaders with 7. He played for the Victoria Athletic Association of the Vancouver Island Soccer League in 2000–1, apparently while stay playing for United. Gilbert left United to join PCSL rival Seattle Hibernian Saints in July 2002.

== International career ==
Gilbert first played for the national team in the 1984 CONCACAF Under-20 Championship, in a tournament in which Canada finished runners-up. He earned his first senior cap as a 22-year-old in a February 1988 friendly played in Hamilton, Bermuda that ended scoreless, and his last one in September 1992 in a 0–2 loss to the United States, a friendly played in Saint John, New Brunswick. Gilbert earned a total of 10 caps and scored once for Canada.

=== International goals ===
Scores and results list Canada's goal tally first.

#	Date	Venue	Opponent	Score	Result	Competition
1	2 April 1992	Royal Athletic Park, Victoria, Canada	China		5–2	Friendly match

== Honours ==
Calgary Kickers

- Canadian Soccer League: 1

1987

- Canadian Soccer League Top Goalscorer: 1

1987

Canada

- North American Nations Cup: 1990; 3rd place, 1991
