= Keith Izatt =

Canadian soccer player (born 1964)

Personal information
- Date of birth: 12 March 1964 (age 62)
- Place of birth: North Vancouver, Canada
- Position: Defender

College career
Years	Team	Apps	(Gls)
- Simon Fraser University

Senior career*
Years	Team	Apps	(Gls)
1987	Vancouver 86ers	15	(0)
1988-1989	Edmonton Brick Men	45	(1)
1990	Winnipeg Fury	24	(0)

International career
1987–1989	Canada	4	(0)
- * Club domestic league appearances and goals

Keith Izatt (born 12 March 1964) is a Canadian former soccer player who played college soccer for Simon Fraser University, professionally for the Vancouver 86ers, Edmonton Brick Men, and Winnipeg Fury and internationally for the Canada national team.
