= Jim Easton Jr. =

Canadian soccer player (born 1965)

James Easton
Personal information
- Full name: James Howatson Easton
- Date of birth: June 3, 1965 (age 61)
- Place of birth: Dumbarton, Scotland
- Height: 6 ft 1 in (1.85 m)
- Position: Midfielder

Youth career
- 1981: Sutherland Secondary School

Senior career*
Years	Team	Apps	(Gls)
1983	Tampa Bay Rowdies (indoor)	3	(0)
1983	Tampa Bay Rowdies	6	(0)
1983–1986	Dundee United	0	(0)
1985	→ Forfar Athletic (loan)	2	(0)
- New Westminster Q.P.R.
1987	Vancouver 86ers	20	(7)
1989	Vancouver 86ers	26	(6)
1990	Hamilton Steelers	25	(7)
1992–1994	Vancouver 86ers	20+	(4+)

International career
1982	Canada U20	3	(0)
1987–1992	Canada	7	(0)
Medal record
Representing Canada
Men's Association football
North American Nations Cup
Winner	1990 Canada
- * Club domestic league appearances and goals

James Howatson Easton (born June 3, 1965) is a Canadian retired soccer midfielder who played professionally in the North American Soccer League, the Scottish First Division, the Canadian Soccer League and for the Canada men's national team.

== Club career ==
Easton was drafted, as a 16-year-old, by the Tampa Bay Rowdies of the NASL on December 14, 1981 and had previously trained with Leicester City in England. After training with Tampa Bay's reserve team in 1982 and in Brazil at São Paulo FC with three other young Rowdies' players, Easton finally cracked the line-up with the Rowdies senior squad in 1983, making six appearances that season. Earlier in the year, he also appeared in several matches during Tampa Bay's indoor campaign, that had culminated with them winning the 1983 title.

After leaving the Rowdies in 1983, Easton signed with Dundee United of the Scottish Premier Division and joined their reserve team squad. In March 1985 he joined club Forfar Athletic on loan, making two appearances for them in the Scottish First Division. Easton was released by Dundee United at the end of the 1985–86 season, having not made any first team appearances in three years at the club.

Easton later played for the New Westminster Q.P.R. squad that was runner-up for the 1987 Canadian national championship. He was selected as a 1987 CSL All-star for the Vancouver 86ers after scoring seven goals in the 20 match season. Easton was also a part of the 86ers' 46-match unbeaten run (36 wins, 9 draws) that spanned parts of the 1988 and 1989 seasons and led to the 1989 team being inducted into the BC Sports Hall of Fame in 2004. In 77 career matches for the 86ers, he scored 24 goals, good for sixth all-time. He also played for Hamilton Steelers.

== International career ==
In 1982 at age 17, Easton appeared in three matches for the Canadian under 20 squad. Before making his full international debut, he was named in Canada's provisional squad of forty prior to the 1986 FIFA World Cup, but didn't make the final cut. Between 1987 and 1992 he appeared in seven matches for the national team.

== Personal life ==
Easton holds an M.A. and an M.B.A., and as of 2011 is the Managing Director of the San Francisco-based ReThink Management Group, which focuses primarily on sports consulting.

His father, Jim Easton, played for several Scottish sides, including Hibernian and Dundee, before playing one season in the NASL and later managing the original Vancouver Whitecaps during the Whitecaps' first two seasons.

In 2018, Easton was named vice president of soccer operations for the Canadian Premier League.

== Honours ==
Canada

- North American Nations Cup: 1990
