= Jack Steele (soccer) =

Canadian soccer player

Personal information
- Date of birth: 1 November 1932 (age 94)
- Place of birth: Victoria, British Columbia, Canada
- Position: Midfielder

International career
Years	Team	Apps	(Gls)
1957	Canada	3	(0)

Jack Steele (born 1932) is a Canadian former international soccer player.
