= Darren Poole =

Canadian soccer player

Personal information
- Date of birth: 27 October 1962 (age 64)
- Place of birth: Edmonton, Alberta, Canada
- Height: 5 ft 8 in (1.73 m)
- Position: Striker

Senior career*
Years	Team	Apps	(Gls)
1980–1982	Edmonton Drillers	15	(1)
1981–1982	Edmonton Drillers (indoor)		
1983	Edmonton Eagles	?	(0)
1986	Edmonton Brick Men		

International career
1981	Canada	1	(0)
- * Club domestic league appearances and goals

Darren Poole (born 27 October 1962) is a Canadian former international soccer player who played as a midfielder.

He played at club level for Edmonton Drillers, Edmonton Eagles and Edmonton Brick Men.
