= Iain Baird =

Canadian former soccer defender

Personal information
- Full name: Iain Baird
- Date of birth: March 4, 1963 (age 63)
- Place of birth: Nanaimo, British Columbia
- Height: 5 ft 9 in (1.75 m)
- Position: Defender

Senior career*
Years	Team	Apps	(Gls)
1985	Victoria Riptides		
1987–1988	Ottawa Pioneers/Intrepid	46	(0)
1989–1990	Victoria Vistas	22	(0)

International career^{‡}
1984–1986	Canada	9	(0)
1987	Canadian Olympic (amateur)	2	(0)

Managerial career
- 1998–2001: Malaspina University College
Medal record
Representing Canada
Men's Association football
CONCACAF Championship
Winner	1985 North America
- * Club domestic league appearances and goals as of 17:47, 24 February 2007 (UTC) ‡ National team caps and goals as of May 7, 2008

Iain Baird (born January 1, 1963) is a Canadian former soccer defender who earned nine caps with the Canadian national soccer team between 1984 and 1986.

Baird played for the Victoria Riptides during the 1985 Western Soccer Alliance Challenge Cup. He played for the Ottawa Pioneers in the Canadian Soccer League in 1987 and again for the renamed Ottawa Intrepid in 1988.

From 1995 to December 2001, Baird was the head coach of the men's soccer team at Malaspina University College in Nanaimo. In 1998, he led the team to a second place at the Canadian Colleges Athletic Association championships. That year the CCAA awarded Coach Baird its Coaching Excellence Award. During his years as a coach, he also taught physical education and Japanese at John Barsby Secondary School. He taught physical education and coached the junior and senior soccer teams at Dover Bay Secondary School in Nanaimo.

== Honours ==
Canada

- CONCACAF Championship: 1985
