= Bill Harper (soccer) =

Canadian soccer player

International career
Years	Team	Apps	(Gls)
1968	Canada	1	(0)

Bill Harper is a Canadian former international soccer player. He appeared in one game for Canada in 1968, without scoring a goal.
