= Greg Ion =

Canadian retired soccer midfielder (born 1963)

Personal information
- Full name: Gregory Stewart Ion
- Date of birth: March 12, 1963 (age 63)
- Place of birth: Vancouver, British Columbia, Canada
- Height: 5 ft 10 in (1.78 m)
- Position: Midfielder

Senior career*
Years	Team	Apps	(Gls)
1981–1982	Portland Timbers	9	(0)
1983	Montreal Manic	11	(0)
1984	Tulsa Roughnecks	21	(4)
1984–1987	Los Angeles Lazers (indoor)	133	(43)
1987	Minnesota Strikers (indoor)	10	(2)
1987	Vancouver 86ers		
1987–1988	Chicago Sting (indoor)	51	(14)
1988–1990	Kansas City Comets (indoor)	99	(48)
1989	Vancouver 86ers		
1990–1992	Tacoma Stars (indoor)	92	(31)

International career
1983–1988	Canada	6	(0)
- * Club domestic league appearances and goals

Gregory Stewart Ion (born March 12, 1963, in Vancouver) is a Canadian retired soccer midfielder.

== Professional ==
The son of Gordie Ion, Gregory Ion graduated from Burnaby North Secondary School. In 1981, the Portland Timbers selected him in the first round of the North American Soccer League draft. However, he lost the entire 1981 season with a knee injury. He came back in 1982 and played nine games, but the team folded at the end of the season. He then signed with the Montreal Manic, but that team collapsed at the end of the 1983 season. On November 10, 1983, the Fort Lauderdale Strikers purchased his contract from the Manic. The Strikers sent Ion to the Tulsa Roughnecks during the 1984 pre-season. When the NASL collapsed at the end of the season, Ion moved to the Los Angeles Lazers of the Major Indoor Soccer League. He remained with the Lazers until March 26, 1987, when the team traded him to the Minnesota Strikers in exchange for Thompson Usiyan. He finished the season with the Strikers. On October 2, 1987, the Strikers traded him to the San Diego Sockers in exchange for draft picks and cash. On November 6, 1987, the Sockers waived Ion during the pre-season as part of a salary reduction move. The Chicago Sting quickly signed him and he spent the 1987–1988 season in Chicago. The Sting, facing financial collapse, released Ion and ten other players on June 2, 1988. Ion then moved to the Kansas City Comets for two seasons. In 1990, he moved to the Tacoma Stars for two seasons.

During the 1986 and 1989, Ion played for the Vancouver 86ers of the Canadian Soccer League. He is inducted into the BC Sports Hall of Fame as member of the record setting 1989 team.

== National team ==
Ion was part of the Canadian team that participated in the FIFA World Cup in 1986.

== Post-playing career ==
Ion was soccer marketer for Adidas and is Program Director of their ESP youth program. He currently runs his own marketing company. He has also been Administrative Director of Club Development with youth soccer club Washington Premier Football Club, in Tacoma, Washington. He is a USSF A licensed coach.

Greg has three daughters Kelsey, Claire and Katelynn.
