= Sven Habermann =

Canadian soccer player

Personal information
- Full name: Sven Habermann
- Date of birth: November 3, 1961 (age 65)
- Place of birth: West Berlin, West Germany

Senior career*
Years	Team	Apps	(Gls)
1983-1984	Toronto Blizzard	7	(0)
1987	Calgary Kickers	19	(0)
1988-1989	Vancouver 86ers	42	(0)
1990	Hamilton Steelers	7	(0)

International career
- Canada
Medal record
Representing Canada
Men's Association football
CONCACAF Championship
Winner	1985 North America
North American Nations Cup
Winner	1990 Canada
- * Club domestic league appearances and goals

Sven Habermann (born November 3, 1961, in West Berlin, West Germany) is a former Canadian national soccer team goalkeeper, who was a member of the team that competed at the 1984 Summer Olympics in Los Angeles, California. Two years later he was on the Canadian roster at the 1986 FIFA World Cup in Mexico but did not see action.

Habermann played for the NASL Toronto Blizzard in 1983 and 1984.

Habermann played in the Canadian Soccer League for the Calgary Kickers. He was named to the league's All-Star team as Calgary won the league play-off championship over the Hamilton Steelers.

Habermann was a member of the 1989 champion Vancouver 86ers team that, beginning from the previous season, set a North American professional sports record by going 46 consecutive games without defeat.

He was named to the league's all-star team as Calgary won the league play-off championship.

Habermann appeared on an episode of Dragon's Den pitching a prototype pepper-spray delivery and self-defense system. All five Dragons bought into Habermann's pitch.

== Honours ==
Canada

- CONCACAF Championship: 1985
- North American Nations Cup: 1990

== See also ==
- List of German Canadians
