= Royal Athletic Park =

Sports venue in Victoria, British Columbia, Canada

Coordinates: 48.4312°N 123.3541°W

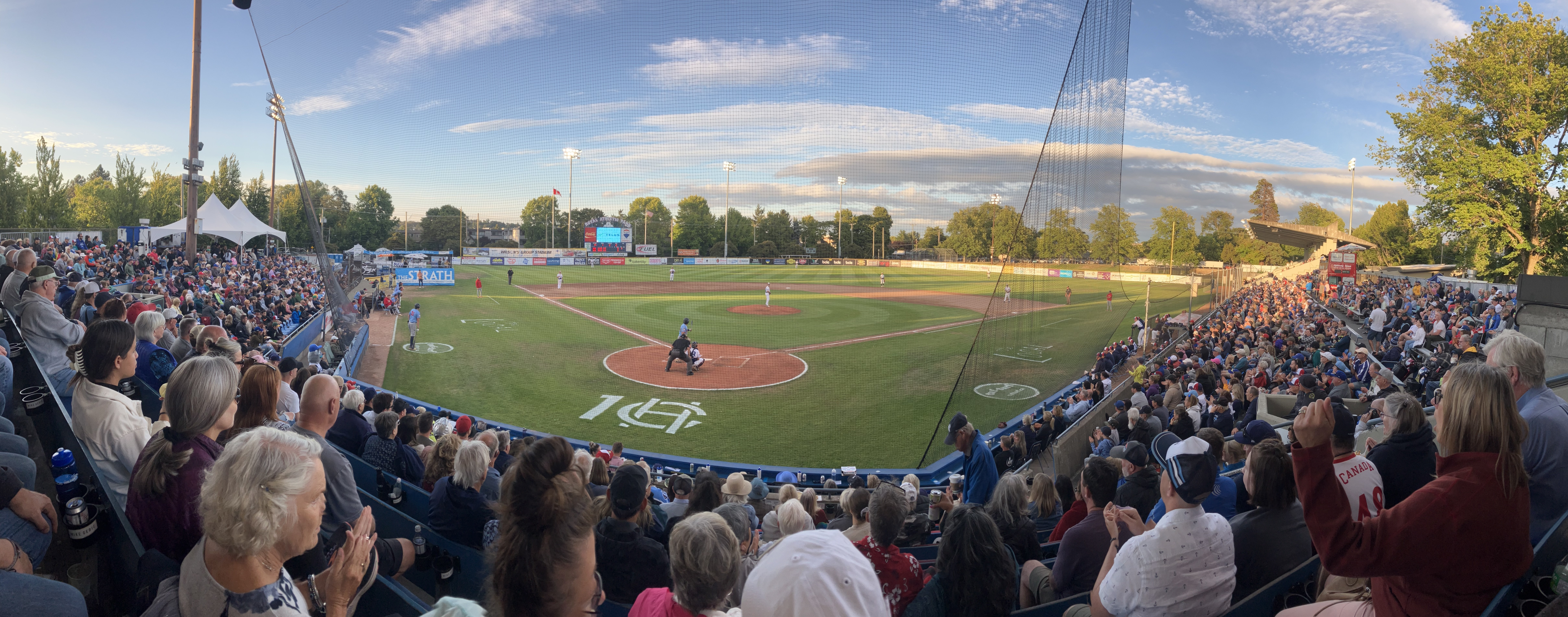

- Location within British Columbia Location within Canada
- Interactive map of Royal Athletic Park
- Address: 1014 Caledonia Avenue; Victoria, British Columbia V8T 1G1
- Owner: City of Victoria
- Capacity: Soccer: 3,800 (Permanent); 10,000 (Temporary, approx.); Baseball: 2,867; expandable to 5,200
- Surface: Natural grass
- Field size: 130 yds × 100 yds (soccer); 160 yds × 75 yds (Canadian football)

Construction
- Groundbreaking: Early 1900s
- Opened: Early 1900s
- Renovated: 1967

Tenants
- Victoria United (PCSL) 1995–2012; Victoria Highlanders (PDL) 2011–2015; Victoria Rebels (CJFL) 1985–2008; Victoria HarbourCats (WCL) 2013–present; Victoria Golden Tide (CCBC) 2021-present; Victoria Athletics (WIL) 1946-1951; Victoria Tyees (WIL) 1919-1954; Victoria Steelers (CoFL) 1967; Victoria Mussels (NWL) 1978-1980; Victoria Riptide (PCSL) 1984-1985; Victoria Vistas (CSL) 1989-1990; Victoria Capitals (CBL) 2003; Victoria Seals (GBL) 2009-2010

Royal Athletic Park (also known as Wilson's Group Stadium at Royal Athletic Park) is a stadium in Victoria, British Columbia, and is used for baseball, soccer, softball and football, but also hosts special events, such as the annual Great Canadian Beer Festival and previously the Rifflandia Music Festival. It is home to the Victoria HarbourCats Baseball Club of the West Coast League. It is located 1 km from the city centre.

== History ==
In 1907 the burgeoning summer athletic teams did not have enough facilities for senior teams with paid attendances. Baseball in particular was challenged to find available dates at Oak Bay Grounds to operate due to a preference for lacrosse.

Subsequently, the supporters of Canada's national summer sport lacrosse, at a meeting chaired by BC Premier Richard McBride formed the Royal Victoria Athletic Association on March 26, 1908, and a senior lacrosse team was founded to enable the best intermediate (Uuder 21) players to play in the British Columbia Amateur Lacrosse Association (BCALA) League. The Oak Bay Grounds were put under the management of the senior baseball team and then later the Rugby Football Club. The lacrosse group, later shortened to the Royal Athletic Association, issued shares at $25 each with deposits of 10% and biannual calls of 10% to raise $25,000 for improvements to the grounds. The lease was signed for 5 acres at the corner of Cook and Pembroke Streets for the grounds.

Contracts had been let by May 12, 1908, and $4,000 from the share offering and gate receipts was spent by June on the construction of a perimeter fence, 2 ticket offices, an inner fence, grandstand, and carriage parking area. The inner fence enclosed the 500-by-285-foot (152 m × 87 m) playing field. The grandstand on the south side of the playing field was 150 by 25 feet (45.7 m × 7.6 m) with 10 rows of seats for more than 1000 spectators. Beneath the grandstand were dressing rooms and concessions. The original layout of the field and grandstand was essentially the same as today's; however, based on maps used in advertising the original field also included half of the city block to the west between Quadra and Vancouver Streets. The carriage parking was on the east side off Cook Street.

The Victoria West Athletic Association, James Bay Athletic Association, and Central Lacrosse Club as well as others with intermediate lacrosse teams also played at the Royal Athletic Association grounds. Field lacrosse was to be the primary sport at the grounds. The facility was a multi-sport community asset from the beginning as cricket, football (Canadian, rugby, and association codes), field sports, boxing, other sports, the circus, fireworks, theatre, and other events were allowed to rent the facility. Due to field shortages, the Victoria and District Football Association (soccer) started renting RAP in September 1908 as the Royal Athletic Association's main winter tenant for district and inter-community league games. The first soccer game played was at 3 pm September 12, 1908, between Victoria West and Fifth Regiment, Victoria West won 10-0. The first recorded baseball game was an exhibition on June 27, 1908, between the Chicago Ladies' Baseball Club and Rendell's Team on June 27, 1908. In the mid-1920s RAP became home to amateur baseball with the construction of the Crystal Gardens on the main Victoria baseball grounds.

The first mention of Royal Athletic Park in the British Colonist (which later merged with the Victoria Times to become the Victoria Times Colonist) is on May 21, 1908. It is an advertisement for an inter-provincial championship lacrosse game against a Vancouver side on May 25, 1908 at the new Royal Athletic Park. Many advertisements right from the start emphasize its location less than 1 1/2 miles (2.4 km) from downtown, still a major feature of the facility's popularity among spectators.

The land was purchased by the city in 1925 from the Royal Athletic Association and the park underwent a major restoration in 1967 after a large fire in 1964 burned the original grandstands. The park has been the home to many different sports teams, notably including the Victoria Rebels (CJFL 1985-2008), Victoria Athletics (Western International League 1946-1954) and Victoria United (Pacific Coast Soccer League 1995-2012).

From July 1 to 11, 2007, Royal Athletic Park was one of six host venues for the 2007 FIFA U-20 World Cup. The stadium hosted Group F, and also featured Japan vs Czech Republic in a Round of Sixteen game.

=== Notable games ===
- 1926 Victoria Reps 1 – 5 English F.A. touring team
- 1927 Victoria Reps 1- 4 Scottish F.A. touring team
- 1929 Victoria 0 – 1 Welsh Selects
- 1930 Victoria West 1 – 8 Glasgow Rangers (really a select side in Vic West colors)
- 1931 Victoria Reps 0 – 7 English 1st Div. Selects
- 1938 Up-Island Selects 3-2 Islington Corinthians F.C.
- 1938 Victoria Reps 3 - 6 Islington Corinthians
- 1950 V & D Selects 2 – 3 English F.A. touring team
- 1951 Victoria & District All-Stars 1-0 Fulham F.C.
- 1952 Island Selects 0 - 7 Tottenham Hotspur F.C.
- 1953 V & D Reps 1 – 5 Irish Professional Team
- 1954 V & D Reps 0 – 7 Glasgow Rangers
- 1963 Victoria 1 – 2 Wolverhampton Wanderers F.C.
- 1966/67 Victoria O'Keefe's 2 – 3 Chelsea F.C.
- 1968/69 Victoria O'Keefe's West Bromwich Albion F.C.
- 1983 Canada 1 - 0 Mexico (Olympic Qualifying)
- 1984 Canada 0 – 0 Costa Rica (Olympic Qualifying)
- 1984 Canada 3 – 0 Cuba (Olympic Qualifying)
- 1985 Canada 2 - 0 Haiti (World Cup Qualifying)
- 1985 Canada 2 – 1 Guatemala (World Cup Qualifying)
- 1991/92 Victoria Vistas vs Dundee United F.C.
- 1991/92 Victoria Vistas vs Chelsea F.C.
- 1992 Canada 5 – 2 China PR (Friendly)
- 1993 Canada 2 – 0 South Korea (Friendly)
- 2024 BC Lions – Ottawa Redblacks (Touchdown Pacific)

== Tenants ==
- Victoria HarbourCats - Baseball

The park is home to a number of local community groups, clubs, and associations. The annual Highland games for example have been a steady user of the facility. The park also plays host to the Great Canadian Beer Festival annually each summer. During the winter and spring Vancouver Island Soccer League games including Jackson Cup playoffs are hosted by RAP. RAP has accommodated everything from amateur as well as professional soccer, junior football, softball to professional baseball games, international competitions, festivals and concerts, among others.

The amateur baseball Victoria HarbourCats of the West Coast League signed a 3-year contract as the anchor tenant starting in 2013. The Harbourcats season runs from June to August. Numerous baseball teams have used RAP since the Victoria Athletics, baseball has been a periodic user of the facility since the Athletics. The Athletics were a New York Yankees b-team in the late 1940s. The last baseball team, the Victoria Seals of the Golden Baseball league, folded after only two seasons, and did not return for the 2011 baseball season.

The park lost their main Canadian football tenant, the Victoria Rebels, in 2008 to the new Bear Mountain Stadium at City Centre Park located in nearby Langford, BC. Field lacrosse is typically played at the Juan de Fuca Recreation Centre and Centennial Stadium. Due to baseball lease arrangements, in 2012 the Victoria United Football Club moved their home grounds to Braefoot Park for 2012. Infrastructure improvements including a more stable moveable outfield fence for baseball are planned to facilitate multiple user groups. RAP was also home to defunct soccer teams, Victoria Riptide and Victoria Vistas of the CSL.

== Layout and design ==
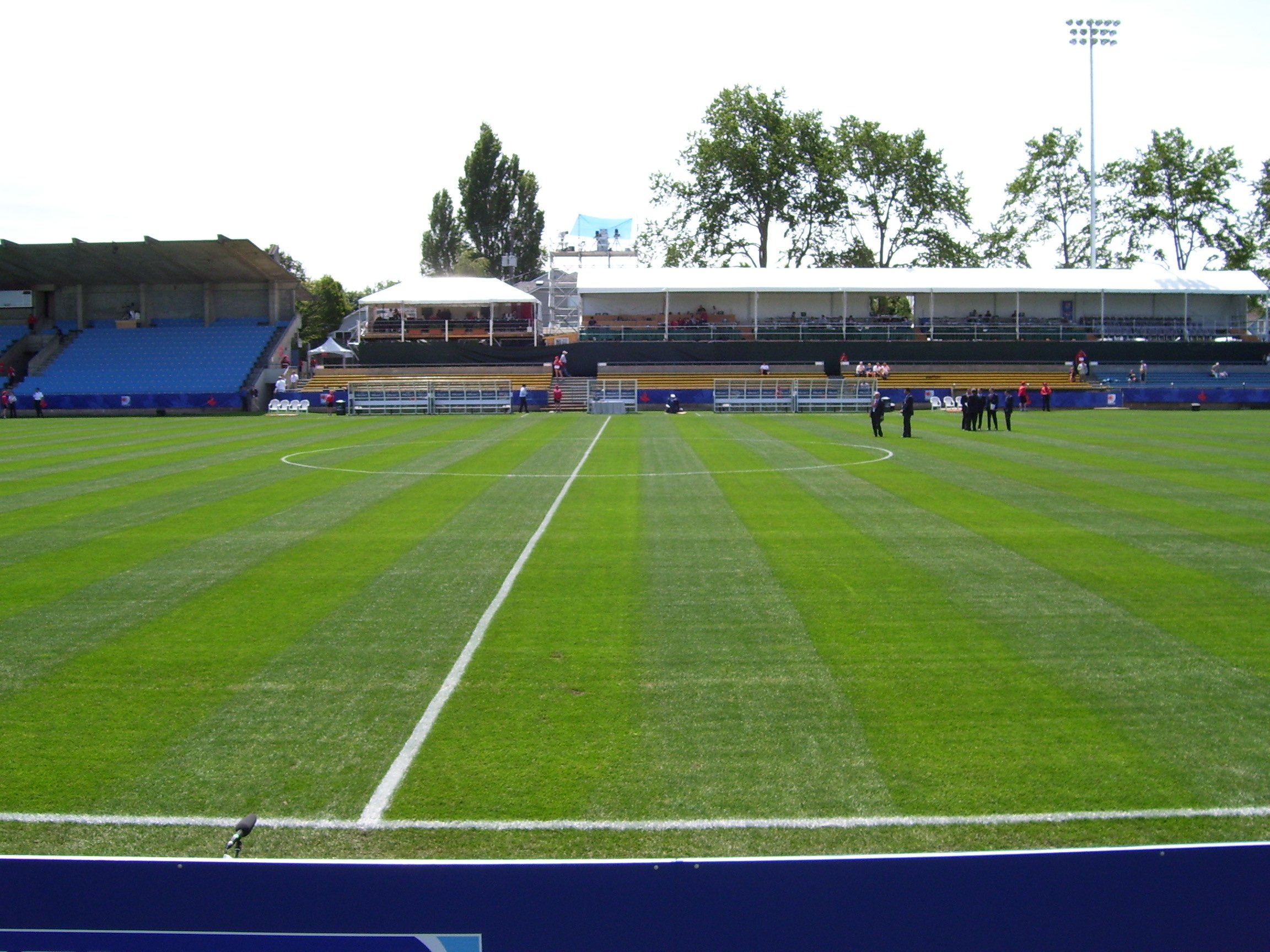
The Park oriented for a soccer match in 2007

The park is a large rectangular plot oriented east-west, and the seating has been designed to accommodate field sports such as football (Canadian, Aussie, Rugby, Association codes), field lacrosse, baseball, and other field sports. The main baseball diamond (there is a secondary one in the NE corner) is located in the southwest corner.

The permanent park seating is set up on the south and west sides of the property in a L-shape. At south sideline midfield, there is the main covered grandstand, about the width of three bleachers, and quite a bit deeper than the bleachers. East of the main grandstand there is a "full length" bleacher and a "half length" bleacher. Between the small "baseball" grandstand at the southwest field corner and the main grandstand there are 4 bleachers. Along the west end of the field extending northward from the smaller "baseball" grandstand is a "full length" bleacher and a "half length" bleacher. The facility is set up to be accessible to as many different sporting entities as possible with the L-shaped seating. The design allows for numerous seating capacities with the addition of temporary seating.

The stadium is surrounded by high-intensity lights on all sides allowing night games. There is surface parking just west of the stadium shared with the hockey arena, Save-On-Foods Memorial Centre. Residential and commercial development including single family detached houses and multi-family developments are on all sides of the city block.

The stadium was recently upgraded with a new $400,000 video scoreboard intended to replace the decades-old minimalist baseball scoreboard. The scoreboard is situated on the northwest side of the park, or just beyond left field using the main baseball diamond configuration. Aside from a large full-colour video screen, the scoreboard also features prominently the name 'Royal Athletic Park' in large, arcing letters overhead.

== Capacity ==
The park has a permanent seating capacity of 5,700 including temporary bleachers. There are 3,800 permanent seats in the covered mid-field grandstand. Depending on its configuration and the event, it can hold a larger capacity, often listed as a max capacity of 9,247. Temporary bleachers were added to expand seating for the 2007 FIFA U-20 World Cup games. (In the above picture, one can see some examples of added temporary seating behind the shorter bleachers on the right half of the picture). An announced total of 14,500 was later altered to 10,500, as temporary grandstands were not erected behind the goal on the east side.

== See also ==
- List of stadiums in Canada
- List of soccer stadiums in Canada
