= Barry Deardon =

Canadian soccer player

Personal information
- Date of birth: 20 March 1963 (age 63)
- Place of birth: Vancouver, Canada
- Height: 5 ft 7 in (1.70 m)
- Position: Midfielder

Senior career*
Years	Team	Apps	(Gls)
1981–1984	Vancouver Whitecaps		
1988	Calgary Kickers	26	(6)

International career
1986	Canada	3	(0)
- * Club domestic league appearances and goals

Barry Deardon (born 20 March 1963) is a Canadian former international soccer player who played as a midfielder.
