= Tom Riley (soccer) =

Canadian soccer player

International career
Years	Team	Apps	(Gls)
1975	Canada	1	(0)

Thomas Riley is a Canadian former international soccer player. He won one cap for Canada in 1975. Riley is a member of the Newfoundland and Labrador Soccer Association Hall of Fame. He attended Memorial University of Newfoundland.
