= Joe Turpin =

Canadian soccer player

International career
Years	Team	Apps	(Gls)
1975	Canada	1	(0)

Joseph Turpin is a Canadian former international soccer player. He won one cap for Canada in 1975. Turpin is a member of the Newfoundland and Labrador Soccer Association Hall of Fame. He attended the University of New Brunswick.
