= Ken Garraway =

Canadian soccer player

Ken Garraway is a former Canadian soccer player.

== Club career ==
Garraway played his youth soccer with the Lakehill Soccer Association in Victoria, British Columbia. Garraway played the summer of 1985 with the Victoria Riptides in the Western Soccer Alliance Challenge Cup.

== International career ==
Garraway played 22 'A' internationals for the Canadian national soccer team.

A forward, Garraway was a regular in the Canadian line-up from 1983 to 1985. Despite his 22 appearances however, he failed to score any national team goals.

Garraway was also a member of the Canadian Olympic team that reached the quarter-finals of the 1984 Los Angeles Olympics, playing in 8 qualifying games. He scored once in qualifying in a 1–2 away loss to Mexico.

He appeared in the final qualifier versus Honduras which clinched qualification for the 1986 World Cup as a substitute for Ian Bridge, but was not in the squad in Mexico.

== Post-retirement ==
Garraway has been a long-time youth soccer coach in Campbell River, British Columbia. He was head coach of the British Columbia Soccer Association's Provincial Under-15 girls' team in 2005–6. He was recognized as "BC Soccer Coach of the Year" in 1993. Most recently in 2009, he won silver in the U-14 division.

== Honours ==
Canada

- CONCACAF Championship: 1985
- BC Soccer Coach of the Year: 1993
