= Ed McNally =

Scottish-born Canadian soccer player

Personal information
- Date of birth: 7 October 1962 (age 64)
- Place of birth: Glasgow, Scotland
- Height: 5 ft 8 in (1.73 m)
- Position: Midfielder

Senior career*
Years	Team	Apps	(Gls)
1981	Toronto Blizzard		
1982	Toronto Italia		
1983	Toronto Nationals		
1983	Hamilton Steelers		
1983	Toronto Italia		
1984	Buffalo Storm		
1987–1989	Ottawa Intrepid	51	(13)
1989	Toronto Blizzard	4	(0)

International career
1983–1987	Canada	4	(0)
- * Club domestic league appearances and goals

Ed McNally (born 7 October 1962) is a Canadian former international soccer player who played as a midfielder.

He played at club level for Toronto Blizzard, Toronto Nationals, Hamilton Steelers, Buffalo Storm and Ottawa Intrepid. In 1982, he played in the National Soccer League with Toronto Italia and assisted in securing the regular season title. In late 1983, he returned to former club Toronto Italia.

In 2014, he was inducted into the Aurora Sports Hall of Fame.
