= Greg Kern =

Canadian soccer player (born 1963)

Personal information
- Full name: Greg Kern
- Date of birth: 14 July 1963 (age 63)
- Place of birth: Calgary, Alberta, Canada
- Position: Defender

Senior career*
Years	Team	Apps	(Gls)
1981–1982	Montreal Manic (indoor)	?	(?)
1982–1983	Montreal Manic	16	(0)
1985	Victoria Riptides	?	(?)
1987	Calgary Kickers	19	(1)
1988	Edmonton Brick Men	23	(2)

International career
1987–1992	Canada Olympic	14	(0)
1986–1988	Canada	12	(0)
- * Club domestic league appearances and goals

Greg Kern (born 14 July 1963) is a Canadian former soccer player who played at both the professional and international levels as a defender.

== Career ==
Born in Calgary, Alberta, Kern signed with the Montreal Manic of the North American Soccer League in the fall of 1981. He would play one indoor and two outdoor seasons with the Manic. In 1985, he played for the Victoria Riptides of the 1985 Western Alliance Challenge Series. In 1986, he joined the Calgary Kickers of the Canadian Soccer League where he was a 1987 First Team All Star. The next year he moved to the Edmonton Brick Men. He also played at full international level for Canada, earning twelve caps between 1986 and 1988.

In 2018, he was appointed as the executive director of Red Deer City Soccer Association.
