= Edmonton Brick Men =

Canadian soccer team

- Founded: 1985
- Dissolved: 1990
- Stadium: John Ducey Park; Clarke Stadium
- Coach: Ross Ongaro
- League: Western Soccer Alliance; Canadian Soccer League

The Edmonton Brick Men (also Edmonton Brickmen) were a Canadian soccer team in Edmonton, Alberta that competed in the Canadian Soccer League and the Western Soccer Alliance. During their time in the WSA and the CSL, the team played at both John Ducey Park and Clarke Stadium for their matches. The choice of John Ducey Park was due in part to the sharing of costs with the Edmonton Trappers.

== History ==
The Edmonton Brick Men were formed in 1985 to fill the void for professional soccer in the city after the Edmonton Drillers of the NASL had folded in 1982 and the Edmonton Eagles of the Canadian Professional Soccer League folded in 1983. The club was owned by Edmonton Oilers owner Peter Pocklington (who previously owned the Drillers) with seed money provided by the Edmonton-based furniture company, The Brick Warehouse, for whom the club was named after, with the logo using the same font for the word Brick as the furniture retailer. The Brick Men were known for giving local players an opportunity, which helped to launch the early careers of several future Canada national team players.

In 1985, while not formally part of the league, they participated in the 1985 Western Alliance Challenge Series where teams from the Western Soccer Alliance (WSA) played a match against either the Brick Men or the Canada national team, with those matches counting towards the standings. The Brick Men played eight games in total in 1985, with a record of four wins, three draws, and a single loss against Dundee FC of the Scottish Premier Division. The next year, they joined the WSA as an official league franchise for the 1986 season. They finished in last place in the seven-team league with a 3–3–8 record, with the record including two matches against Manchester City and Dundee FC. Despite the poor performance that year, their attendance was reasonable, ranging between 3000 and 4000 spectators per game.

After the 1986 season, the Brick Men departed the WSA to join the new Canadian Soccer League for its inaugural season. In their inaugural CSL match on June 7, 1987, they were defeated by the Vancouver 86ers by a score of 4–2. In their first season, they posted a 7–7–6 record, to finish in third place in the West Division, before falling to Vancouver in the first round of the playoffs.

In their second season in the CSL, they struggled, winning only 4 of their 28 matches to finish last in their division and the league. They bounced back in 1989, finishing second in their division, qualifying for the playoffs, where they won their first playoff series, defeating provincial rivals Calgary in the first round, before being trounced by Vancouver 9–3 on aggregate (5–3 and 4–0 losses) in the semi-finals.

In 1990, the club once again failed to make the playoffs, after finishing last in their four-team division. The club folded following the 1990 season.

== Seasons ==
Season	Tier	League	Record	Rank	Playoffs	Ref
1986	1 (US)	Western Soccer Alliance	3–3–8	7th	–	
1987	1	Canadian Soccer League	7–7–6	3rd, West	Quarter-finals	
1988	1	Canadian Soccer League	4–5–19	4th, West	Did not qualify	
1989	1	Canadian Soccer League	9–3–14	2nd, West	Semi-finals	
1990	1	Canadian Soccer League	6–14–6	4th, West	Did not qualify	

== Notable players ==
- (Switzerland) (United States) Bob Ammann
- (Canada) John Baretta
- (England) Dave Barnett
- (Canada) Ivan Belfiore
- (Canada) Rick Celebrini
- (Canada) Chris Chueden
- (Canada) Pasquale de Luca
- (Canada) Paul Dolan
- (England) Justin Fashanu
- (Canada) Drew Ferguson
- (Canada) Nick Gilbert
- (England) Ray Hudson
- (Canada) Keith Izatt
- (Canada) Greg Kern
- (Canada) David McGill
- (Chile) Luis Mosquera
- (Canada) David Norman
- (Canada) Norm Odinga
- (Canada) Giuliano Oliviero
- (Canada) Ross Ongaro
- (Canada) Tony Pesznecker
- (Canada) Darren Poole
- (Canada) Niall Thompson
- (Canada) Gregor Young
