= Jeff Cambridge =

Canadian soccer player

Personal information
- Date of birth: 22 November 1966 (age 59)
- Place of birth: London, Ontario, Canada
- Height: 5 ft 9 in (1.75 m)
- Position: Midfielder

Senior career*
Years	Team	Apps	(Gls)
1987–1990	Winnipeg Fury	81	(12)
1992	London Lasers	11	(0)

International career
1984–1985	Canada U20	14	(1)
1984–1987	Canada	7	(0)
- * Club domestic league appearances and goals

Jeff Cambridge (born 22 November 1966) is a Canadian retired association football player who earned 7 caps for the Canadian national side between 1984 and 1987. He played club football for Winnipeg Fury from 1987 to 1990.

Cambridge has been active since retiring as a youth soccer coach in London, Ontario.
