= Domenic Mobilio =

Canadian soccer player (1969–2004)

Personal information
- Date of birth: January 14, 1969
- Place of birth: Vancouver, British Columbia, Canada
- Date of death: November 13, 2004 (aged 35)
- Place of death: Burnaby, British Columbia, Canada
- Height: 6 ft 0 in (1.83 m)
- Position: Striker

Senior career*
Years	Team	Apps	(Gls)
1987–2000	Vancouver 86ers	280	(167)
1989–1992	Baltimore Blast (indoor)	182	(171)
1993–1994	→ Dundee	2	(0)
1993–1996	Harrisburg Heat (indoor)	46	(72)
1996–1999	Edmonton Drillers (indoor)	79	(92)
1999–2000	Philadelphia Kixx (indoor)	59	(96)
2000–2001	Detroit Rockers (indoor)	15	(27)
Total		661	(625)

International career
1986–1997	Canada	25	(3)
- * Club domestic league appearances and goals

Domenic Mobilio (January 14, 1969 – November 13, 2004) was a Canadian professional soccer player who played as a striker.

== Club career ==
Born in Vancouver, British Columbia, Mobilio was a long-time member of the Vancouver 86ers turned Vancouver Whitecaps. He played 14 seasons beginning with the team in the Canadian Soccer League, later joining the American Professional Soccer League, before finishing up a Whitecap. He retired from the professional outdoor game in 2001.

Although Mobilio had trials overseas, most notably in Scotland (he played two Scottish Premier Division games in the 93/94 season for Dundee F.C.) and the Netherlands, he never left Vancouver. His 167 goals in 280 games is second for a player in professional soccer in Canada and the United States after the NASL's great Giorgio Chinaglia and his total of 243. He was a six time league all-star (CSL 1988, 1990, and 1991; APSL 1993 and 1996; A-League, 1997); the CSL's all-time leading scorer and 1990 top scorer and MVP. He began the 1996-1997 NPSL season with the Harrisburg Heat, but was traded to the Edmonton Drillers after seven games.

He also was a long-time pro indoor soccer player, being named MISL Newcomer of the Year for 1989 playing for the Baltimore Blast. He played with the Blast until 1992. Mobilio also played in the National Professional Soccer League with the Philadelphia Kixx and the Detroit Rockers.

== International career ==
Mobilio was a member of the Canadian U-20 team which competed at the 1987 FIFA World Youth Championship and that won the gold medal in the 1989 Jeux de la Francophonie.

He made his senior debut for Canada in a January 1986 friendly match against Paraguay and went on to earn 25 caps. Mobilio scored three goals, all coming in a nearly successful qualifying campaign for the 1994 FIFA World Cup finals.

His final international was a November 1997 World Cup qualification match against the USA.

== Coaching career ==
Upon retirement, Mobilio worked as a technical director with the Coquitlam City Soccer Association and became a coach of youth soccer in Coquitlam. He also coached the senior boys soccer team at Archbishop Carney Regional Secondary School in Port Coquitlam.

== Personal life and death ==
Mobilio attended high school at Templeton Secondary School in East Vancouver, graduating in 1987. He was not only a prolific soccer player at Templeton but also, a star basketball player.

His cousin Melissa Mobilio played for Vancouver Whitecaps Women and the Trinity Western Spartans.

Mobilio died in 2004 at age 35 of a sudden and massive heart attack, suffered while driving from a friend's house in Burnaby after playing a game of amateur soccer. Friends and relatives then established a foundation in his memory to fund various soccer associations to allow under privileged children an opportunity to enjoy the sport.

== Career statistics ==
Scores and results list Canada's goal tally first.

#	Date	Venue	Opponent	Score	Result	Competition
1	April 18, 1993	Swangard Stadium, Burnaby, Canada	Honduras	1-1	3-1	1994 FIFA World Cup qualification
2	May 2, 1993	Estadio Cuscatlán, San Salvador, El Salvador	El Salvador	2-1	2-1	1994 FIFA World Cup qualification
3	July 31, 1993	Commonwealth Stadium, Edmonton, Canada	Australia	2-1	2-1	1994 FIFA World Cup qualification

== Honours ==
Mobilio was inducted into the Canadian Soccer Hall of Fame in 2006. He was inducted in the Baltimore Blast Hall of Fame on February 16, 2008.
