= Vancouver Whitecaps (1986–2010) =

Defunct Canadian soccer club

- Full name: Vancouver Whitecaps
- Nickname: 'Caps
- Short name: Whitecaps
- Founded: 1986; 40 years ago (as Vancouver 86ers)
- Dissolved: 2010; 16 years ago (MLS 2011)
- Stadium: Swangard Stadium; Burnaby, British Columbia
- Capacity: 5,288
- Owner: Greg Kerfoot
- Head coach: Teitur Thordarson
- League: CSL (1987–1992); APSL (1993–1994); A-League (1995–2004); USL First Division (2005–2009); USSF Division 2 Professional League (2010)
- 2010: Regular Season: 2nd, NASL; Overall: 5th Playoffs: Semifinals
- Website: http://whitecapsfc.com/
Home colours	Away colours

The Vancouver Whitecaps were a Canadian professional soccer club based in Vancouver, British Columbia. Founded in 1986, the team played its final year in the second tier of the United States soccer pyramid in the NASL Conference of the USSF Division 2 Professional League coached by Teitur Thordarson. The team played its home games at Swangard Stadium in nearby Burnaby, British Columbia. The team's colours were blue and white.

On March 19, 2009, an ownership group led by principal Greg Kerfoot was granted a Major League Soccer expansion franchise which began play in 2011 under the name Vancouver Whitecaps FC.

In addition to its men's side the Whitecaps also field a women's team in the USL W-League, two developmental teams (Vancouver Whitecaps Residency, in the USL Premier Development League, and the Whitecaps FC Prospects, in the Pacific Coast Soccer League), and four youth teams in the USL Super Y-League (Coastal WFC, Mountain WFC, Surrey WFC and Okanagan WFC) ranging in age from U13 to U17 for both boys and girls.

The team was previously known as the Vancouver 86ers of both the Canadian Soccer League, American Professional Soccer League (APSL), and later the A-League. The club later played in two later versions of the second tier A-League known as the USL-1 and USSF Division 2 Professional League in North America.

== History ==
=== Vancouver 86ers ===
Vancouver 86ers logo 1993-1998

Vancouver 86ers logo 1986–1992

In 1986, a professional soccer team was again launched in Vancouver. The club was initially going to be named Vancouver United, but that name was rejected for sounding too British. The name Vancouver 86ers was chosen instead to commemorate the founding of the city of Vancouver in 1886, the founding of the team in 1986, the Expo 86 hosted by Vancouver that year, the Canadian national team's first World Cup qualification, and the 86 people who contributed $500 each to fund the new team as the West Coast Soccer Society.

The 86ers played in the Canadian Soccer League (CSL). Led by player/head coach Bob Lenarduzzi and his assistant Alan Errington, the 86ers were triumphant in their inaugural CSL match, as they defeated Edmonton Brick Men 4–2 in front of 7,646 fans at Swangard Stadium in Burnaby, BC, on June 7, 1987. The 86ers went on to finish second in the Western Division standings that year before bowing out to inaugural league champions Calgary Kickers in the playoff semifinals. From 1988 to 1991, the 86ers won four straight CSL Championships, as well and five consecutive CSL regular-season first-place finishes from 1988 to 1992.

In 1988–1989, the team, coached by Bob Lenarduzzi, set a North American professional sports record by playing 46 consecutive games without a loss. Also in 1988 the Vancouver 86ers and Calgary Kickers played six friendly matches each against the Western Soccer Alliance in the month of May.

In 1990, the Vancouver 86ers captured the North American Club Championship after defeating the Maryland Bays 3–2 in the final played in Burnaby. The game was played between the champions of the Canadian Soccer League and the champions of the American Professional Soccer League (APSL). The 86ers however came up short in the first round of the 1992 Professional Cup North American Club Championship. Facing APSL champions Colorado Foxes over two legs, Vancouver suffered a heartbreaking 3–2 defeat in the first leg in Colorado on August 3, 1992, before the Foxes advanced to the final, as a 2–1 second-leg win at Swangard on August 11, 1992, secured a 5–3 aggregate victory for Colorado. Vancouver played in the CSL from its inception in 1987 until the league folded in 1992, and then moved over to the APSL in 1993 which was later absorbed into the USL hierarchy of leagues in 1997 becoming the A-League, later renamed the USL.

=== Vancouver Whitecaps (USL) ===
Logo of the Vancouver Whitecaps during the USL era

In 2001, the team began to use the old Vancouver Whitecaps moniker (signifying both the 'white caps' of the nearby mountains, and the waves of the Pacific Ocean). In 2003, the name was again changed, albeit only slightly, to Whitecaps FC, which encompasses the men's, women's, and youth development teams within the organization. At this time, the Whitecaps logo changed slightly in colour (the light teal-green was replaced with a brighter blue) and the word "Vancouver" was dropped from the image.

In 2006, the Whitecaps organization won an unprecedented double-championship, claiming both the United Soccer Leagues First Division championship trophy, defeating the host Rochester Rhinos 3–0 at PAETEC Park, and winning the W-League women's trophy. The men's team also won the Nation's Cup, a new tournament established by their club as a way to feature the Whitecaps playing against international competition. The 2006 Nation's Cup tournament featured the Chinese and Indian U-20 National teams and Championship Welsh club Cardiff City F.C. (the "Bluebirds"). The gradually added the "Vancouver" back into their name, changing it officially to "Vancouver Whitecaps FC".

The following season, the Whitecaps signed a deal to play an exhibition match against the Los Angeles Galaxy, which featured international David Beckham, and promoted Director of Soccer Operations Bob Lenarduzzi to team president.

October 12, 2008, they claimed their second United Soccer Leagues First Division championship with a 2–1 victory over the Puerto Rico Islanders. Charles Gbeke scored twice with his head in the second half to help secure the title. In 2009, they placed 7th in the league and were eliminated in the final by the Montreal Impact on a 6–3 aggregate.

In November 2009 the Whitecaps, along with several other teams, announced their intent to leave the USL First Division to become the co-founders of a new North American Soccer League, which was to begin play in 2010. On January 7, 2010, the USSF announced that neither the USL nor the NASL would be permitted to have a second division league, and the USSF would administer a league where the NASL and USL are conferences within the league.

On November 24, 2009, it was announced that Paul Barber, the former executive director of Tottenham Hotspur, will become the Chief Executive Operations director of the Caps.

Whitecaps played a 30-match regular season, with 15 home games and a 15 games away in the United States Soccer Federation Division 2 Professional League.

=== The Whitecaps and Major League Soccer ===
In May 2008, the Whitecaps announced plans to move to BC Place stadium once renovations were completed. Following the announcement, MLS commissioner Don Garber commented "there is no doubt the market for professional soccer exists in Vancouver, as we saw last November when nearly 50,000 fans attended the exhibition match between the Los Angeles Galaxy and the Whitecaps".

On July 24, 2008, the MLS announced they were seeking to add two expansion franchises for the 2011 season. One day later, the Whitecaps officially announced that they were pursuing one of the two expansion slots. The Whitecaps also announced that local sports icon Steve Nash will join the Whitecaps ownership team.

Vancouver's bid was officially submitted on October 15, 2008, along with bids from six other cities. Whitecaps representatives Greg Kerfoot and Jeff Mallett met with MLS officials on November 21, 2008, to go over their bid. Don Garber, who was previously involved in National Football League expansion, described the bid presentation as, "one of the best I've ever seen." Garber and MLS president Mark Abbott were in Vancouver on December 7, 2008, to tour BC Place Stadium and learn about the proposed renovations, which were scheduled to be completed in time for the 2011 MLS season.

Vancouver was officially named an MLS expansion city on March 18, 2009, and joined the league in 2011. They began their inaugural MLS season at Empire Field, a temporary stadium built at the former site of Empire Stadium, and moved into BC Place Stadium when renovations to the stadium were completed.

== Players ==
=== Staff ===
==== Management ====
- Greg Kerfoot Owner
- Bob Lenarduzzi President
- Paul Barber Chief Executive Officer
- Rachel Lewis Chief Operating Officer
- Dave Irvine Manager of Technical Programs
- Tom Soehn Director of Soccer Operations
- Chris Murphy Director of Professional Development
- Dan Lenarduzzi Director of Youth Development

==== Sports ====
- Teitur Thordarson Head Coach
- Colin Miller Assistant Coach
- Mike Salmon Goalkeeping Coach

==== Medical ====
- Graeme Poole Physiotherapist
- Chris Franks Physiotherapist
- Al Ezaki Athletic Therapist
- Dr. Bob McCormack Team Physician
- Dr. Jim Bovard Team Physician
- Steve Ramsbottom Strength & Conditioning Specialist
- Darren Woloshen Equipment Manager

== Year-by-year ==
This is a complete list of seasons for the CSL and USL club. For a season-by-season history including the current Vancouver Whitecaps FC MLS franchise, see History of Vancouver Whitecaps FC. For solely MLS results, see List of Vancouver Whitecaps FC seasons.

Season	League											Position		Playoffs	CC	Continental		Average attendance	Top goalscorer(s)	
Season	Div	League	Pld	W	L	D	GF	GA	GD	Pts	PPG	Conf.	Overall	Playoffs	CC	Continental		Average attendance	Name	Goals
1987	1	CSL	20	9	8	3	37	27	+10	30	1.50	2nd	4th	SF	–	Ineligible		5,993	(Canada) Domenic Mobilio	12
1988	1	CSL	28	21	1	6	84	30	+54	69	2.46	1st	1st	W	–	Western Soccer Alliance	N/A (Note: Vancouver played a match against each WSA team in the 1988 season. These matches did count towards the league standings for their opponents, however, Vancouver itself was not included in the league standings, and did not achieve any position. Vancouver finished with a record of 3 wins and 3 losses against WSA opponents.)	4,919	(Canada) John Catliff (Canada) Domenic Mobilio	22
1989	1	CSL	26	18	2	6	65	33	+32	60	2.31	1st	1st	W	–	Ineligible		4,572	(Canada) Domenic Mobilio	12
1990	1	CSL	26	17	6	3	69	26	+43	54	2.08	1st	1st	W	–	North American Club Championship	W	4,218	(Canada) John Catliff	19
1991	1	CSL	28	20	4	4	69	31	+38	64	2.29	N/A	1st	W	–	Ineligible		6,347	(Canada) Domenic Mobilio	26
1992	1	CSL	20	11	6	3	42	28	+14	36	1.80	N/A	1st	RU	–	CONCACAF Champions' Cup Professional Cup	R1 R1	4,344	(Canada) John Catliff (Canada) Dale Mitchell	6
1993	2	APSL	24	15	9	0	43	35	+8	45	1.88	N/A	1st	SF	–	Ineligible		4,866	(Canada) Domenic Mobilio	11
1994	2	APSL	20	7	13	0	25	41	–16	21	1.05	N/A	6th	DNQ	–	Ineligible		4,742	(Canada) Domenic Mobilio	7
1995	2	A-League	24	10	14	0	43	43	0	30	1.25	N/A	3rd	SF	–	Ineligible		4,493	(Canada) Giuliano Oliviero	9
1996	2	A-League	27	13	14	0	38	38	0	39	1.44	N/A	5th	DNQ	–	Ineligible		4,068	(Canada) Domenic Mobilio	14
1997	2	A-League	28	16	12	0	50	29	+21	48	1.71	3rd	6th	SF	–	Ineligible		3,558	(Canada) Domenic Mobilio	22
1998	2	A-League	28	15	13	0	55	42	+13	45	1.61	4th	15th	R1	–	Ineligible		4,185	(Canada) Jason Jordan	8
1999	2	A-League	28	19	9	0	77	31	+46	57	2.04	3rd	4th	R1	–	Ineligible		4,559	(Canada) Niall Thompson	20
2000	2	A-League	28	14	11	3	62	41	+21	45	1.61	5th	9th	QF	–	Ineligible		3,959	(England) Darren Tilley	12
2001	2	A-League	26	16	8	2	44	33	+11	50	1.92	1st	4th	SF	–	Ineligible		5,542	(Canada) Jason Jordan	9
2002	2	A-League	28	11	12	5	41	39	+2	38	1.36	5th	10th	SF	–	Ineligible		3,769	(Canada) Jason Jordan	9
2003	2	A-League	28	15	6	7	45	24	+21	52	1.86	4th	5th	QF	–	Ineligible		4,292	(Canada) Ollie Heald (Canada) Jason Jordan	9
2004	2	A-League	28	14	9	5	38	29	+9	47	1.68	2nd	6th	SF	–	Ineligible		4,833	(Canada) Jason Jordan	7
2005	2	USL-1	28	12	7	9	37	21	+16	45	1.61	N/A	3rd	QF	–	Ineligible		5,086	(Canada) Jason Jordan	17
2006	2	USL-1	28	12	6	10	40	28	+12	46	1.64	N/A	4th	W	–	Ineligible		5,085	(United States) Joey Gjertsen	12
2007	2	USL-1	28	9	7	12	27	24	+3	39	1.39	N/A	7th	QF	–	Ineligible		5,162	(Cuba) Eduardo Sebrango	7
2008	2	USL-1	30	15	7	8	34	28	+6	53	1.77	N/A	2nd	W	3rd	DNQ		4,999	(Cuba) Eduardo Sebrango	16
2009	2	USL-1	30	11	10	9	42	36	+6	42	1.40	N/A	7th	RU	RU	DNQ		5,312	(Canada) Charles Gbeke	13
2010	2	D2 Pro	30	10	5	15	32	22	+10	45	1.50	2nd	5th	SF	RU	DNQ		5,152	(Canada) Martin Nash	5
Total	–	–	639	330	199	110	1139	759	+380	1100	1.72	–	–	–	–	–		–	(Canada) Domenic Mobilio	167

1. Avg. attendance include statistics from league matches only.
2. Top goalscorer(s) includes all goals scored in League, League Playoffs, Canadian Championship, CONCACAF Champions League, FIFA Club World Cup, and other competitive continental matches.
3. Points and PPG have been adjusted from non-traditional to traditional scoring systems for seasons prior to 2003 to more effectively compare historical team performance across seasons.

== Honours ==
=== Major ===
==== Domestic ====
Canadian Soccer League

- Playoff Championship
  - Winners: 1988, 1989, 1990, 1991
  - Runners-up: 1992
- Regular Season
  - Winners: 1988, 1989, 1990, 1991, 1992

Canadian Championship

- Runners up: 2009, 2010

USL First Division

- Playoff Championship
  - Winners: 2006, 2008
  - Runners-up: 2009
- Commissioner's Cup
  - Winners: 1993
  - Runners-up: 2008

==== International ====
- North American Club Championship
  - Winners: 1990

=== Minor ===
Rivalry Cups

- Cascadia Cup
  - Winners: 2004, 2005, 2008
- Voyageurs Cup (USL)
  - Runners-up: 2005, 2007

Other

- Nations Cup
  - Winners: 2006

== Head coaches ==
Name	Nationality	Years	Ref
Bob Lenarduzzi	CAN	1987–1993	
Carl Valentine	ENG	1994–1999	
Dale Mitchell	CAN	2000–2001	
Tony Fonseca	POR	2002–2004	
Bob Lilley	USA	2005–2007	
Teitur Thordarson	ISL	2008–2010	

== Stadium ==
- Swangard Stadium; Burnaby, British Columbia (2003–2010)

=== Proposed new stadium ===
For some time, the City of Vancouver and the ownership group of the Whitecaps were considering the idea to build the team a soccer-specific stadium called Whitecaps Waterfront Stadium. The new stadium was to be built over the railway tracks east of Waterfront Station on Burrard Inlet.

This 16,000-seat stadium would have replaced Swangard Stadium as the home field for the USL's Vancouver Whitecaps.

There was a fair degree of controversy with regards to this location; a Vancouver council session to debate the issue was extended to four nights to allow public input. Detractors viewed the proposed stadium as an incongruous addition to nearby historic Gastown that would block waterfront access and promote piecemeal development of the area. Proponents of the development felt that the stadium would attract new business to the downtown and Gastown areas, particularly since the soccer team tended to attract a family-oriented audience.

On July 11, 2006, Vancouver City Council voted unanimously to proceed with the stadium project, so long as the Whitecaps could meet certain conditions regarding land use. On January 22, 2007, the Whitecaps filed a new proposal shifting the proposed site for the stadium project to the current location of the SeaBus terminal, a short distance northwest of the previous site.

With the Whitecaps moving up to MLS, the franchise has signed to initially play at Empire Field, and then BC Place Stadium from 2011 to at least 2015. It was hoped that the new facility would be completed by the 2016 MLS season. Due to the hurdles of getting the new stadium approved, the project has been abandoned with the team committed to playing at BC Place Stadium.

== Club culture ==
=== Mascot ===
The Whitecaps' mascot was named Winger. He is a bird who wears a Whitecaps jersey and carries a large drum to encourage the crowd. He often uses signs to get fans in the grandstands to cheer.

=== Fans ===
The Whitecaps have an independent supporters group known as the Southsiders. Founded in 1999, the group is named for their preferred seating area in the south end of Swangard Stadium. The Southsiders, once described as a "rabid supporters group", identify themselves as Canada's oldest supporters association for professional domestic soccer.

The group originally called themselves "The Carlsberg Crew," named for the beer company that sponsored Swangard's beer garden. The name was changed to "The Canterbury Chorus" for the subsequent season, as the beer sponsorship had changed between seasons. To avoid changing names every time the sponsor changed, the group chose the name "The Southsiders".

=== Rival clubs ===
The Vancouver Whitecaps have two historic rivals, the Pacific Northwest Portland Timbers and Seattle Sounders. These three teams competed in the yearly Cascadia Cup through 2008. In 2009, the Cup involved only the Whitecaps and Timbers because the Sounders were replaced by an MLS team of the same name.

The Whitecaps also competed on a yearly basis with the Montreal Impact and Toronto FC for the Voyageurs Cup or Canadian Championship. The winner of this series advances to the CONCACAF Champions League.

== Notes ==
Preceded by 2005 Seattle Sounders	USL–1 champions 2006 (first title)	Succeeded by 2007 Seattle Sounders
Preceded by 2007 Seattle Sounders	USL–1 champions 2008 (second title)	Succeeded by 2009 Montreal Impact
