= Canadian Soccer League (1987–1992) =

Former soccer league in Canada

- Founded: 1987
- Folded: 1992
- Commissioner: Dale Barnes (1987–1991)
- Divisions: East and West (1987–1990)
- No. of teams: 6–11
- Country: Canada
- Confederation: CONCACAF
- Most titles: Vancouver 86ers (4 championships)
- Broadcaster: The Sports Network
- Level on pyramid: 1
- International cups: North American Club Championship (1990); Professional Cup (1992)

The Canadian Soccer League was a Division 1 professional soccer league that operated for six seasons between 1987 and 1992. It was a nationwide league that had teams in six provinces over the course of its history. It was the last top-division league in Canada until the Canadian Premier League began play in 2019.

== History ==
=== Early Canadian professional soccer ===
Professional soccer existed in multiple form in Canada in the decades prior to the formation of the CSL. In 1926, the National Soccer League was formed in Canada, which evolved into the modern edition of the Canadian Soccer League, but was more of a semi-professional nature. From 1960 to 1961, the Eastern Canada Professional Soccer League (ECPSL) operated in the country, at times attracting crowds of around 10,000 spectators. From 1968 to 1984, the US-based North American Soccer League (NASL), a top division professional league, contained two Canadian teams at its inception (the Toronto Falcons and Vancouver Royals), rising to five Canadian teams at the time of its folding - the Calgary Boomers, Edmonton Drillers, Montréal Manic, Vancouver Whitecaps and Toronto Blizzard. In 1983, a fully professional Canadian-only league, the Canadian Professional Soccer League was formed, but it failed to last a full season before disbanding.

=== Formation of the CSL ===
Following the folding of the NASL, the Canadian Soccer Association created the Canadian Soccer League (CSL). It was the CSA's second attempt at a national professional league, following the failed CPSL in 1983. The CSL was formed in the aftermath of Canada's participation in the 1986 World Cup finals tournament held in Mexico, for which Canada was an oddity as a country whose association was able to qualify a team despite not having a domestic professional league, or even a domestically based professional team with the demise in 1984 of the U.S.-based North American Soccer League. Founding league commissioner Dale Barnes voiced sentiment aptly when he said the league is to "bring our players home." In its first season the league had 138 Canadian players across its eight teams and most of the players from Canada’s 1986 World Cup squad joined the league. Learning from the CPSL failure, the organizers attempted to lay the foundation more successfully, with several teams coming from existing franchises in the provincial leagues, including a team salary limit of $300,000 for players.

=== Inaugural season ===
In the league's inaugural season, eight teams were divided into two divisions. The East Division consisted of National Capital Pioneers, Hamilton Steelers, Toronto Blizzard, and the North York Rockets. The West Division comprised the Calgary Kickers, Edmonton Brick Men, Vancouver 86ers, and the Winnipeg Fury. The league's inaugural match took place on June 7, 1987 in Aylmer, Quebec between the National Capital Pioneers and the Hamilton Steelers and finished in a 1–1 draw, in a steady drizzle, in front 2,500 spectators. That season, Hamilton won their division both in the regular season and in the playoffs, as did Calgary. The final saw the top point-getting team in the regular season, Calgary, defeat the second-best side, Hamilton, 2–1 at home in a winner take all one game final.

=== Continuation ===
The league gained a leap in credibility when an agreement was reached with TSN to broadcast a CSL Game of the Week, allowing a nationwide audience to view a game on domestic cable TV each Sunday evening. Broadcasts featured play-by-play commentator Vic Rauter and analyst Graham Leggat. The league received sponsorship from companies such as Gatorade, Gillette, Chrysler, Molson, and Umbro, among others. Also the league adopted the standard FIFA points system (2–1–0, then 3–1–0) as well as allowing for draws instead of 'Americanizing' the points system with bonus points and two different categories for both wins and losses unlike the NASL or the APSL which was to follow.

Over the course of the league's six seasons, various teams joined the league including Montreal Supra, Victoria Vistas, London Lasers, Kitchener Spirit, and the Nova Scotia Clippers. Financial instability was common with many teams folding during the years. Only four clubs - Vancouver, North York, Toronto, and Winnipeg - participated in all six seasons. In early 1991, league commissioner Dale Barnes retired before the start of the 1991 season, with Hamilton Steelers owner Mario DiBartolomeo becoming the interim league president. The next year, Montreal Supra owner Frank Aliaga being named the new league president.

The Vancouver 86ers became the dominant team in the league, winning the four consecutive league titles from 1988 to 1991. In 1992, the Winnipeg Fury ended Vancouver's run, winning the final MITA Cup, before the league folded.

=== Downfall and league folding ===
The league and its franchises struggled with financial issues throughout its tenure. After the 1991 season, four franchises folded, which was the start of the end of the league. The financial picture did not improve during the season, and with dysfunction about the most sustainable path for professional soccer, concerns about club stability – declining attendance and red ink continuing to mount in most markets, the resignation of Canadian soccer advocates such as Mario DiBartolomeo, Frank Aliaga, and Karsten von Wersebe. Vancouver media reported that the Vancouver 86ers' owner was the only team to fully pay league dues during the final season and had injected $65,000 for the London Lasers to finish the season, and paid playoff travel and accommodation expenses for the Toronto Blizzard.

On October 6, 1992, the day of the CSL final, it was announced that Vancouver joined the APSL, a league trying to show the USSF it had the wherewithal, new higher standards for 1993 (financial capitalization, salary budget, $1 million operating budget, front office, coaching, market size etc.), to be chosen as the Division 1 league by the USSF. Vancouver cited financial stability and higher growth prospects with the league expected by some to become the USSF's Division 1 league as required by FIFA when awarded the United States the 1994 World Cup.

Even with the Vancouver defection to the United States, the CSL planned to have seven clubs for the 1993 season as of mid-December 1992 including a Burnaby, B.C.-based team; however, opposition from the Vancouver 86ers stymied this ownership's efforts. However, the Toronto Blizzard and Montreal Supra had also planned to join the APSL, although it was not able to meet the financial requirements for the league and instead a new club, Montreal Impact formed and joined the APSL. Meanwhile, Winnipeg and North York joined the Canadian National Soccer League.

When the dust cleared, there were not six Canadian professional teams, the minimum for a league, that survived in any form for the 1993 season, and the league officially folded, bringing an end to the first truly national Canadian league to finish a season. This was a major blow for the Canadian Soccer Association and Canadian soccer, as the CSL had been enormously successful in providing Canadian players with a higher level of competition than had been available at any other time than the North American Soccer League years. As of 2014, after the 1986 World Cup, players from the CSL cohort have still progressed the furthest in World Cup Qualifying and formed the veteran core of the 2000 CONCACAF Gold Cup winning squad.

=== Aftermath ===
Following the demise of the CSL, Canadian professional teams such as the Montreal Impact, Vancouver Whitecaps, and Toronto Lynx continued to play in US-based professional leagues, with later teams such as Toronto FC and Ottawa Fury FC forming as well. In 2019, a new Canadian professional league, the Canadian Premier League was launched, serving as the country's first national professional league since the end of the CSL.

== Teams ==
The Canadian Soccer League showcased 13 teams throughout its six-year history, debuting in 1987 with 8 clubs. The league reached its peak of club participation and national exposure in the 1990 season with 11 clubs, while closing out its final season in 1992 with a low of 6 clubs. Some clubs involved in the league, such as the Vancouver 86ers and Toronto Blizzard, existed prior to the formation of the CSL and would go on to play in other leagues after the CSL's demise in following the 1992 season. Clubs participating in the CSL throughout its six years of existence included:

Team	City	Seasons	Top league rank	Top playoff rank
Calgary Kickers / Calgary Strikers	Calgary, Alberta	3 (1987–1989)	1st	Champion
Edmonton Brick Men	Edmonton, Alberta	4 (1987–1990)	5th	Semi-final
Hamilton Steelers	Hamilton, Ontario	5 (1987–1991)	2nd	Final
Kitchener Spirit / Kitchener Kickers	Kitchener, Ontario	2 (1990–1991)	6th	Semi-final
London Lasers	London, Ontario	2 (1990, 1992)	5th	N/A
Montreal Supra	Montreal, Quebec	5 (1988–1992)	3rd	Semi-final
North York Rockets	North York, Ontario	6 (1987–1992)	2nd	Semi-final
Nova Scotia Clippers	Halifax, Nova Scotia	1 (1991)	6th	Quarter-final
National Capital Pioneers / Ottawa Intrepid	Ottawa, Ontario	4 (1987–1990)	3rd	Quarter-final
Toronto Blizzard	Toronto, Ontario	6 (1987–1992)	2nd	Final
Vancouver 86ers	Vancouver, British Columbia	6 (1987–1992)	1st	Champion
Victoria Vistas	Victoria, British Columbia	2 (1989–1990)	4th	Semi-final
Winnipeg Fury	Winnipeg, Manitoba	6 (1987–1992)	3rd	Champion

== Season summary ==
Canadian Soccer League Winners
Season	Teams	Regular season leaders	Playoff Champions MITA Cup	Final score(s)	Playoff Finalists
1987	8	Calgary Kickers (West); Hamilton Steelers (East)	Calgary Kickers	2–1	Hamilton Steelers
1988	9	Vancouver 86ers (West); Hamilton Steelers (East)	Vancouver 86ers	4–1	Hamilton Steelers
1989	10	Vancouver 86ers (West); Toronto Blizzard (East)	Vancouver 86ers	3–2	Hamilton Steelers
1990	11	Vancouver 86ers (West); Toronto Blizzard (East)	Vancouver 86ers	6–1	Hamilton Steelers
1991	8	Vancouver 86ers	Vancouver 86ers	5–3	Toronto Blizzard
1992	6	Vancouver 86ers	Winnipeg Fury	2–0 1–1	Vancouver 86ers

== Notable players ==
Twenty-six players from the Canadian Soccer League have since been inducted in the Canada Soccer Hall of Fame. From that group, 11 honoured members made their professional debuts in the Canadian Soccer League.

- Bob Bolitho
- Ian Bridge
- Alex Bunbury (1987 rookie)
- John Catliff (1987 rookie)
- Carlo Corazzin (1992 rookie)
- Nick Dasovic
- Jason de Vos (1990 rookie)
- Paul Dolan
- Gerry Gray
- Lyndon Hooper (1987 rookie)
- Paul James
- Bob Lenarduzzi
- Tino Lettieri
- John Limniatis (1987 rookie)
- Colin Miller
- Dale Mitchell
- Domenic Mobilio (1987 rookie)
- Pat Onstad (1987 rookie)
- Paul Peschisolido (1989 rookie)
- Tomasz Radzinski (1991 rookie)
- Randy Ragan
- Randy Samuel
- Branko Šegota
- Mike Sweeney
- Carl Valentine
- Mark Watson (1990 rookie)

== See also ==
- Canadian Professional Soccer League, a Canadian D1 league that existed in 1983
- Canadian Premier League, the current Canadian D1 league that began play in 2019

Preceded by Canadian Professional Soccer League	Division 1 soccer league in Canada; 1987–1992	Succeeded by Canadian Premier League
