= 1979 Vancouver Whitecaps season =

Vancouver Whitecaps 1979 soccer season

Vancouver Whitecaps
1979 season
- Owner: Herb Capozzi
- General manager: John Best
- Head coach: Tony Waiters
- North American Soccer League: Division: 1st Conference: 3rd Overall: 4th
- NASL Playoffs: Champions
- Challenge Trophy: Ineligible (Note: A national championship tournament for professional clubs was not organized by Canada Soccer in 1979, or any year until 2008.)
- Top goalscorer: League: Kevin Hector (15); All: Kevin Hector (17)
- Highest home attendance: 32,875 vs NYC; NASL Playoffs (8/29)
- Lowest home attendance: 16,965 vs SD; NASL (5/02)
- Biggest win: VAN 4–1 NYC NASL (6/16); VAN 3–0 TOR NASL (7/21)
- Biggest defeat: LA 2–0 VAN; NASL (8/04)
Home colours	Away colours

The 1979 Vancouver Whitecaps season was the club's sixth season in the North American Soccer League.

== Roster ==
The 1979 squad coached by Tony Waiters:

Note: Flags indicate national team as defined under FIFA eligibility rules; some limited exceptions apply. Players may hold more than one non-FIFA nationality.

No.	Pos.	Nation	Player
1	GK	ENG	Phil Parkes
2	MF	ENG	Ray Lewington
3	DF	ENG	Bob McNab
4	DF	ENG	John Craven
5	DF	CAN	Robert Lenarduzzi
6	DF	ENG	Roger Kenyon
7	MF	CAN	Buzz Parsons
8	MF	ENG	Jon Sammels
9	FW	ENG	Trevor Whymark
10	MF	CAN	Bob Bolitho
11	FW	ENG	Kevin Hector
12	DF	CAN	Paul Nelson
17	DF	ENG	Peter Daniel
18	DF	CAN	Dan Lenarduzzi

No.	Pos.	Nation	Player
20	FW	SCO	Willie Johnston
21	FW	CAN	Carl Valentine
22	GK	ZIM	Bruce Grobbelaar
23	FW	ENG	Alan Ball
23	MF	CAN	Drew Ferguson
24	FW	ENG	Derek Possee
25	MF	CAN	David McCaig
26	MF	CAN	David McGill
27	MF	SCO	Gerry Gray
28	FW	CAN	Steve Nesin
29	DF	CAN	Carl Shearer
30	DF	CAN	Alan Soundraal
31	FW	CAN	Ralston Dunlop
32	FW	CAN	Brent Barling

== North American Soccer League ==
Competition	First match	Last match	Starting round	Final position	Record							
Competition	First match	Last match	Starting round	Final position	Pld	W	D	L	GF	GA	GD	Win %
Regular season	30 March	11 August	Matchday 1	1st NC West, 4th Overall	30	20		10	54	34	+20	66.67
Playoffs	15 August	8 September	Conference Quarterfinals	Winner	9	7		2	13	8	+5	77.78
Total					39	27	0	12	67	42	+25	69.23

Last updated: 4 August 2023
Source: Competitions

=== Regular season ===
==== Standings ====
-Playoffs via division standings. -Playoffs via wildcard.

NC West Division standings
Pos	Team	Pld	W	L	GF	GA	GD	BP	Pts
1	Vancouver Whitecaps	30	20	10	54	34	+20	52	172
2	Los Angeles Aztecs	30	18	12	62	47	+15	54	162
3	Seattle Sounders	30	13	17	58	52	+6	47	125
4	Portland Timbers	30	11	19	50	75	−25	56	122

Updated to match(es) played on September 2, 1979. Source: Overall standings

National Conference standings
Pos	Div	Team	Pld	W	L	GF	GA	GD	BP	Pts	Qualification
1	E	New York Cosmos	30	24	6	84	52	+32	72	216	Playoffs (division winner)
2	C	Minnesota Kicks	30	21	9	67	48	+19	58	184	Playoffs (division winner)
3	W	Vancouver Whitecaps (N)	30	20	10	54	34	+20	52	172	Playoffs (division winner)
4	E	Washington Diplomats	30	19	11	68	50	+18	58	172	Playoffs (division runner-up)
5	W	Los Angeles Aztecs	30	18	12	62	47	+15	54	162	Playoffs (division runner-up)

Updated to match(es) played on September 2, 1979. Source: Overall standings
Rules for classification: 1) Division position; 2) Points; 3) Wins; 4) Goal differential
(N) Conference champion

Overall standings
Pos	Div	Team	Pld	W	L	GF	GA	GD	BP	Pts
2	AC	Houston Hurricane	30	22	8	61	46	+15	55	187
3	NC	Minnesota Kicks	30	21	9	67	48	+19	58	184
4	NW	Vancouver Whitecaps (C)	30	20	10	54	34	+20	52	172
5	NE	Washington Diplomats	30	19	11	68	50	+18	58	172
6	AE	Tampa Bay Rowdies	30	19	11	67	46	+21	55	169

Updated to match(es) played on September 2, 1979. Source: soccerstats.us
Rules for classification: 1) Points; 2) Wins; 3) Goal differential
(C) NASL Champions

==== Results ====
Match record by division
Conference	West	Central	East	Total
National Conference	4–2 (0–0)	4–2 (0–1)	4–2 (0–0)	12–6 (0–1)
American Conference	6–2 (0–1)	1–1 (1–0)	1–1 (0–1)	8–4 (1–2)
Total	10–4 (0–1)	5–3 (1–1)	5–3 (0–1)	20–10 (1–3)

==== Matches ====
30 March 1	Vancouver Whitecaps	1–2 (SO)	Dallas Tornado	Vancouver, British Columbia
	Hector	Report	Gomez	Stadium: Empire Stadium; Attendance: 24,850

6 April 2 Inter-conference	Vancouver Whitecaps	2–0	Edmonton Drillers	Vancouver, British Columbia
	Hector; Craven	Report		Stadium: Empire Stadium; Attendance: 18,097

14 April 3 Inter-conference	Chicago Sting	2–3 (SO)	Vancouver Whitecaps	Chicago, Illinois
	Granitza; Hanegem	Report	Sammels; Hector	Stadium: Soldier Field; Attendance: 10,130

21 April 4	Vancouver Whitecaps	2–1	Portland Timbers	Vancouver, British Columbia
	Whymark	Report	Bain	Stadium: Empire Stadium; Attendance: 23,137

27 April 5 Inter-conference	San Diego Sockers	1–0	Vancouver Whitecaps	San Diego, California
	Nover	Report		Stadium: Jack Murphy Stadium; Attendance: 10,514

2 May 6 Inter-conference	Vancouver Whitecaps	3–1	San Diego Sockers	Vancouver, British Columbia
	Hector; Whymark	Report	Nover	Stadium: Empire Stadium; Attendance: 16,965

5 May 7 Inter-conference	San Jose Earthquakes	1–2	Vancouver Whitecaps	San Jose, California
	Gersdorff	Report	Hector; Daniel	Stadium: Spartan Stadium; Attendance: 14,107

11 May 8	Vancouver Whitecaps	1–0	Rochester Lancers	Vancouver, British Columbia
	Valentine	Report		Stadium: Empire Stadium; Attendance: 22,078

18 May 9 Inter-conference	Vancouver Whitecaps	2–0	Philadelphia Fury	Vancouver, British Columbia
	Hector; Whymark	Report		Stadium: Empire Stadium; Attendance: 18,293

30 May 10 Inter-conference	Edmonton Drillers	1–3	Vancouver Whitecaps	Edmonton, Alberta
	Kraay	Report	Hector	Stadium: Commonwealth Stadium; Attendance: 10,529

2 June 11 Inter-conference	Vancouver Whitecaps	0–1	Houston Hurricane	Vancouver, British Columbia
		Report	Marasco	Stadium: Empire Stadium; Attendance: 26,013

7 June 12	Tulsa Roughnecks	1–2	Vancouver Whitecaps	Tulsa, Oklahoma
	Abrahams	Report	Valentine; Lewington	Stadium: Skelly Stadium; Attendance: 10,102

9 June 13	Minnesota Kicks	1–0	Vancouver Whitecaps	Bloomington, Minnesota
	Futcher	Report		Stadium: Metropolitan Stadium; Attendance: 24,061

13 June 14 Inter-conference	California Surf	3–2 (SO)	Vancouver Whitecaps	Anaheim, California
	Ingram	Report	Hector; Possee	Stadium: Anaheim Stadium; Attendance: 7,182

16 June 15	Vancouver Whitecaps	4–1	New York Cosmos	Vancouver, British Columbia
	Sammels; Valentine; Hector; Derek Possee	Report	Chinaglia	Stadium: Empire Stadium; Attendance: 32,372

24 June 16 Inter-conference	Vancouver Whitecaps	2–1	California Surf	Vancouver, British Columbia
	Johnston; Ball	Report	Steve David	Stadium: Empire Stadium; Attendance: 20,814

27 June 17	Atlanta Chiefs	1–3	Vancouver Whitecaps	Atlanta, Georgia
	Neill Roberts	Report	Hector; Ball	Stadium: Atlanta-Fulton County Stadium; Attendance: 5,152

30 June 18 Inter-conference	Fort Lauderdale Strikers	3–2 (SO)	Vancouver Whitecaps	Fort Lauderdale, Florida
	Cubillas; Walker	Report	Possee; Whymark	Stadium: Lockhart Stadium; Attendance: 15,290

4 July 19	Toronto Blizzard	2–1	Vancouver Whitecaps	Toronto, Ontario
	Lorimer; Lukacevic	Report	Valentine	Stadium: Varsity Stadium; Attendance: 13,754

7 July 20	Vancouver Whitecaps	3–1	Seattle Sounders	Vancouver, British Columbia
	Ball; Whymark	Report	Ryan	Stadium: Empire Stadium; Attendance: 20,041

11 July 21	Vancouver Whitecaps	0–1	Los Angeles Aztecs	Vancouver, British Columbia
		Report	Cruyff 26'	Stadium: Empire Stadium; Attendance: 28,764

15 July 22	New York Cosmos	2–4	Vancouver Whitecaps	East Rutherford, New Jersey
	Neeskens 60'; Chinaglia 71', (red card) 72'; Eskandarian (red card) 72'	Report (Soccerstats) [Report (Sun) ]	Alberto 6' (o.g.); Hector 49'; Lewington 63'; Johnston (red card) 72'; Craven (red card) 72'; Lenarduzzi 83'	Stadium: Giants Stadium; Attendance: 48,753

18 July 23	Washington Diplomats	2–1	Vancouver Whitecaps	Washington, D.C.
	Askew; Droege	Report	Ball	Stadium: Robert F. Kennedy Stadium; Attendance: 12,321

21 July 24	Vancouver Whitecaps	3–0	Toronto Blizzard	Vancouver, British Columbia
	Whymark; Sammels; Ball	Report		Stadium: Empire Stadium; Attendance: 21,409

25 July 25	Vancouver Whitecaps	1–0	Tulsa Roughnecks	Vancouver, British Columbia
	Whymark	Report		Stadium: Empire Stadium; Attendance: 21,196

28 July 26	Portland Timbers	2–3	Vancouver Whitecaps	Portland, Oregon
	Dale Mitchell	Report	Ball; Lenarduzzi; Whymark	Stadium: Civic Stadium; Attendance: 12,727

1 August 27	Vancouver Whitecaps	1–0	Minnesota Kicks	Vancouver, British Columbia
	Lenarduzzi	Report		Stadium: Empire Stadium; Attendance: 24,656

4 August 28	Los Angeles Aztecs	2–0	Vancouver Whitecaps	Los Angeles, California
	Dangerfield; Cruyff	Report		Stadium: Rose Bowl; Attendance: 11,157

8 August 29 Inter-conference	Vancouver Whitecaps	1–0	San Jose Earthquakes	Vancouver, British Columbia
	Whymark	Report		Stadium: Empire Stadium; Attendance: 25,731

11 August 30	Seattle Sounders	1–2	Vancouver Whitecaps	Seattle, Washington
	Neighbour	Report	Ball; Parsons	Stadium: Kingdome; Attendance: 24,196

=== Playoffs ===
==== Conference Quarterfinals – vs Dallas (N6) ====
15 August Game 1	Dallas Tornado	2–3	Vancouver Whitecaps	Dallas, Texas
	Kewley; Zequinha	Report	Parsons; Hector; Lewington	Stadium: Ownby Stadium; Attendance: 8,829

18 August Game 2	Vancouver Whitecaps	2–1	Dallas Tornado	Vancouver, British Columbia
	Craven	Report	Pecher	Stadium: Empire Stadium; Attendance: 30,328

Vancouver won series 2–0.

==== Conference Semifinals – vs Los Angeles (N5) ====
22 August Game 1	Los Angeles Aztecs	3–2 (SO)	Vancouver Whitecaps	Pasadena, California
	Sibbald; Smeets	Report	Valentine	Stadium: Rose Bowl; Attendance: 21,213

25 August Game 2	Vancouver Whitecaps	1–0	Los Angeles Aztecs	Vancouver, British Columbia
	Smeets 59' (o.g.)	Report		Stadium: Empire Stadium; Attendance: 32,375

25 August Mini-game	Vancouver Whitecaps	1–0	Los Angeles Aztecs	Vancouver, British Columbia
	Hector 4'	[]		Stadium: Empire Stadium; Attendance: 32,375

Series tied 1–1, Vancouver won tiebreaking mini-game.

==== Conference Championships – vs New York (N1) ====
29 August Game 1	Vancouver Whitecaps	2–0	New York Cosmos	Vancouver, British Columbia
	Johnston; Whymark	Report		Stadium: Empire Stadium; Attendance: 32,875

1 September Game 2	New York Cosmos	3–2 (SO)	Vancouver Whitecaps	East Rutherford, New Jersey
	Chinaglia 11', 39'	Report	Craven 28'; Johnston 85'	Stadium: Giants Stadium; Attendance: 44,109
	Penalties
	Marinho (penalty missed); Beckenbauer (penalty scored); Seninho (penalty scored); Garbett (penalty scored)		(penalty missed) Johnston; (penalty scored) Lenarduzzi; (penalty missed) Ball; (penalty missed) Valentine

1 September Mini-game	New York Cosmos	0–1 (SO)	Vancouver Whitecaps	East Rutherford, New Jersey
		Report		Stadium: Giants Stadium; Attendance: 44,109
	Penalties
	Neeskens (penalty scored); Beckenbauer (penalty missed); Garbett (penalty scored); Davis (penalty missed); Morais (penalty missed)		(penalty scored) Lenarduzzi; (penalty missed) Bolitho; (penalty scored) Valentine; (penalty scored) Possee; (penalty missed) Ball

Series tied 1–1, Vancouver won tiebreaking mini-game.

==== Soccer Bowl – vs Tampa Bay (A2) ====
8 September NASL Final	Vancouver Whitecaps	2–1	Tampa Bay Rowdies	East Rutherford, New Jersey
2:00 p.m. EDT	Whymark 13', 60'		Van der Veen 23', (yellow card) 79'; Marsh (yellow card) 34'; Connell (yellow card) 67'; Gorman (yellow card) 86'; Fabbiani (yellow card) 87'	Stadium: Giants Stadium; Attendance: 50,699; Referee: Gino D'Ippolito (United States)
