= 1978 Vancouver Whitecaps season =

Vancouver Whitecaps 1978 soccer season

Vancouver Whitecaps FC
1978 season
- Owner: Herb Capozzi
- General manager: John Best
- Head coach: Tony Waiters
- NASL: Division: 1st Overall: 2nd
- NASL Playoffs: Quarterfinals
- Highest home attendance: 30,752 vs DT July 12, 1978
- Lowest home attendance: 9,266 vs RL April 16, 1978
- Average home league attendance: 15,736
Home colours	Away colours

The 1978 Vancouver Whitecaps season was the fifth season of the Whitecaps, and their fifth year in the North American Soccer League and the top flight of Canadian soccer.

This was coach Tony Waiter's first full season with the club. The team was dominant in the 1978 with 68 goals scored, a thirteen-game winning streak, and a 24-6 record – tied with the dramatically higher spending powerhouse New York Cosmos for the best record in the NASL. The Whitecaps achieved this with mainly unrecognized players, nicknamed the "English Mafia" for primarily English foreign players coupled with locals including Italian-Canadians. Due to the large number of teams, 24, the season was not set up with a balanced home and away schedule with some teams played twice, others once, and still others not at all. After the league during the playoff tournament in which 16 of 24 teams competed, the Whitecaps defeated Toronto Metros-Croatia in front of 30,811 at Empire Stadium (at the time the largest crowd to see two Canadian teams play against each other) before being upset by the Portland Timbers in the quarterfinals two games to nil.

'King' Kevin Hector led the Whitecaps with 21 goals and ten assists while tying for fourth in the golden boot race. Bob Lenarduzzi also had a strong season on the score sheet with ten goals and seventeen assists along with Bob Campbell and John Craven. Phil Parkes was the top goalkeeper in the NASL with 29 games played, a 0.95 GAA and 10 clean sheets. Alan Hinton, Steve Kember, and Bob Bolitho also were main contributors over the season. Despite the team's record and strong attendance at fifth highest in the league, the club received little recognition at the All Star Game with only Kevin Hector and John Craven named to the second team. They recouped that recognition though with Tony Waiters awarded Coach of the Year and the North American Player of the Year awarded to Bob Lenarduzzi.

== Club ==
=== Roster ===
The 1978 squad

Note: Flags indicate national team as defined under FIFA eligibility rules; some limited exceptions apply. Players may hold more than one non-FIFA nationality.

No.	Pos.	Nation	Player
1	GK	(England) ENG	Phil Parkes
2	DF	(Canada) CAN	Garry Ayre
3	DF	(England) ENG	Steve Harrison
4	DF	(England) ENG	John Craven
5	DF	(Canada) CAN	Robert Lenarduzzi
6	DF	(Canada) CAN	Silvano Lenarduzzi
7	MF	(Canada) CAN	Buzz Parsons
8	MF	(England) ENG	Jon Sammels
9	MF	(Canada) CAN	Drew Ferguson
10	MF	(Canada) CAN	Bob Bolitho
11	FW	(England) ENG	Kevin Hector

No.	Pos.	Nation	Player
12	DF	(Canada) CAN	Paul Nelson
14	MF	(England) ENG	Steve Kember
15	MF	(Canada) CAN	Wayne Jentas
16	MF	(Canada) CAN	Dale Mitchell
17	DF	(England) ENG	Peter Daniel
18	DF	(Canada) CAN	Dan Lenarduzzi
19	FW	(Canada) CAN	Sam Saundh
20	FW	(England) ENG	Alan Hinton
21	FW	(England) ENG	Mickey Lambert
21	FW	(Northern Ireland) NIR	Robert Campbell
22	GK	(England) ENG	Steve Humphreys
24	FW	(England) ENG	Derek Possee

=== Team management ===
Tony Waiters' first full season as coach of Vancouver Whitecaps coach in 1978 saw the Whitecaps tied for the best record in the NASL at 24-6 and win the Coach of the Year Award.

== Results ==
=== Results by round ===
Round	1	2	3	4	5	6	7	8	9	10	11	12	13	14	15	16	17	18	19	20	21	22	23	24	25	26	27	28	29	30
Ground	H	H	H	A	A	H	H	A	A	A	H	H	H	A	A	A	H	H	A	A	H	A	H	A	H	A	H	A	H	A
Result	L	W	W	L	W	W	W	W	W	L	W	W	W	L	L	D	L	W	D	W	W	W	W	W	W	W	W	W	W	W

Source: soccerstats.us
A = Away; H = Home; W = Win; D = Draw; L = Loss

=== Match results ===
April 2, 1978 1	Vancouver Whitecaps	1 – 4	San Diego Sockers	Vancouver
	Kevin Hector	Report	Gerry Ingram; Peter Anderson	Stadium: Empire Stadium; Attendance: 11,425

April 9, 1978 2	Vancouver Whitecaps	3 – 0	Seattle Sounders	Vancouver
	Bob Lenarduzzi; Kevin Hector; Alan Hinton	Report		Stadium: Empire Stadium; Attendance: 11,232

May 16, 1978 3	Vancouver Whitecaps	4 – 1	Toronto Metros-Croatia	Vancouver
	Buzz Parsons; John Craven; Kevin Hector; Derek Possee	Report	Mike Stojanovic	Stadium: Empire Stadium; Attendance: 9,266

April 18, 1978 4	California Surf	1 – 0	Vancouver Whitecaps	Los Angeles
	Malcolm Lord	Report		Stadium: Anaheim Stadium; Attendance: 10,602

April 23, 1978 5	Colorado Caribous	0 – 1	Vancouver Whitecaps	Denver, Colorado
		Report	Own goal	Stadium: Mile High Stadium; Attendance: 7,389

April 30, 1978 6	Vancouver Whitecaps	0 – 2	California Surf	Vancouver
	Kevin Hector	Report		Stadium: Empire Stadium; Attendance: 10,649

May 7, 1978 7	Vancouver Whitecaps	1 – 0	Portland Timbers (1975–1982)	Vancouver
	Steve Kember	Report		Stadium: Empire Stadium; Attendance: 13,155

May 10, 1978 8	Seattle Sounders	1 – 2	Vancouver Whitecaps	Seattle
	Tommy Ord	Report	Kevin Hector; Bob Lenarduzzi	Stadium: Memorial Stadium; Attendance: 17,085

May 14, 1978 9	Rochester Lancers	1 – 2	Vancouver Whitecaps	Rochester, New York
	Francisco Bolota	Report	John Craven	Stadium: Holleder Memorial Stadium; Attendance: 4,119

June 5, 1975 10	Minnesota Kicks	3 – 2	Vancouver Whitecaps	Bloomington, Minnesota
	Ian Hamilton; Ace Ntsoelengoe; Alan Willey	Report	Own goal Bob Lenarduzzi	Stadium: Metropolitan Stadium; Attendance: 25,495

May 20, 1978 11	Vancouver Whitecaps	1 – 0	Colorado Caribous	Vancouver
	Kevin Hector	Report		Stadium: Empire Stadium; Attendance: 12,643

May 27, 1978 12	Vancouver Whitecaps	2 – 1	Washington Diplomats	Vancouver
	Kevin Hector; Bob Lenarduzzi	Report	Vitseskic	Stadium: Empire Stadium; Attendance: 12,150

June 1, 1978 13	Vancouver Whitecaps	1 – 0	Tampa Bay Rowdies	Vancouver
	Kevin Hector	Report		Stadium: Empire Stadium; Attendance: 14,051

June 4, 1978 14	New York Cosmos	3 – 2	Vancouver Whitecaps	East Rutherford, New Jersey
	Giorgio Chinaglia; Santiago Formoso	Report	John Craven; Derek Possee	Stadium: Giants Stadium; Attendance: 44,675

June 7, 1978 15	New England Tea Men	2 – 0	Vancouver Whitecaps	Foxborough, Massachusetts
	Mike Flanagan; Roger Gibbins	Report		Stadium: Foxboro Stadium; Attendance: 4,862

June 10, 1978 16	Washington Diplomats	1 – 1 (SO)	Vancouver Whitecaps	Washington, D.C.
	Mike Bakic	Report	John Craven	Stadium: RFK Stadium; Attendance: 10,615

June 17, 1978 17	Vancouver Whitecaps	0 – 1	Toronto Metros-Croatia	Vancouver
		Report	Marko Vujkovic	Stadium: Empire Stadium; Attendance: 15,661

June 22, 1975 18	Vancouver Whitecaps	5 – 1	Tulsa Roughnecks	Vancouver
	Bob Lenarduzzi; Bob Campbell; Steve Kember; Kevin Hector	Report	Billy Gazonas	Stadium: Empire Stadium; Attendance: 10,524

June 28, 1978 19	San Jose Earthquakes	0 – 0 (SO)	Vancouver Whitecaps	San Jose, California
		Report		Stadium: Spartan Stadium; Attendance: 14,263

July 1, 1978 20	Los Angeles Aztecs	0 – 2	Vancouver Whitecaps	Pasadena, California
		Report	Bob Campbell	Stadium: Rose Bowl; Attendance: 3,795

July 5, 1978 21	Vancouver Whitecaps	2 – 1	Detroit Express	Vancouver
	John Craven	Report	Graham Oates	Stadium: Empire Stadium; Attendance: 18,625

July 8, 1978 22	Dallas Tornado	1 – 2	Vancouver Whitecaps	University Park, Texas
	Max Thompson	Report	Bob Campbell; Kevin Hector	Stadium: Ownby Stadium; Attendance: 5,461

July 12, 1978 23	Vancouver Whitecaps	6 – 1	Dallas Tornado	Vancouver
	Jon Sammels; Derek Possee; Kevin Hector; Bob Lenarduzzi; Bob Campbell	Report	Brian Kettle	Stadium: Empire Stadium; Attendance: 30,752

July 15, 1978 24	Memphis Rogues	1 – 2	Vancouver Whitecaps	Midtown, Memphis, Tennessee
	Jimmy Husband	Report	Kevin Hector; Bob Campbell	Stadium: Liberty Bowl Memorial Stadium; Attendance: 8,201

July 17, 1978 25	Vancouver Whitecaps	2 – 1	Oakland Stompers	Vancouver
	Kevin Hector; Bob Campbell	Report	Archie Roboostoff	Stadium: Empire Stadium; Attendance: 18,783

July 21, 1978 26	Portland Timbers	0 – 2	Vancouver Whitecaps	Portland, Oregon
		Report	Kevin Hector	Stadium: Civic Stadium; Attendance: 23,536

July 27, 1978 27	Vancouver Whitecaps	4 – 1	Los Angeles Aztecs	Vancouver
	Kevin Hector; Bob Campbell; Steve Kember	Report	George Dewsnip	Stadium: Empire Stadium; Attendance: 22,910

July 30, 1978 28	Oakland Stompers	2 – 6	Vancouver Whitecaps	Oakland, California
	McCulloch	Report	Bob Campbell; Jon Sammels; Steve Kember; John Craven; Peter Daniel	Stadium: Oakland–Alameda County Coliseum; Attendance: 6,421

August 3, 1978 29	Vancouver Whitecaps	6 – 0	San Jose Earthquakes	Vancouver
	Bob Lenarduzzi; Kevin Hector; Own goal	Report		Stadium: Empire Stadium; Attendance: 24,216

August 6, 1978 30	San Diego Sockers	1 – 2	Vancouver Whitecaps	San Diego, California
	Doganovic	Report	Steve Kember; Jon Sammels	Stadium: Jack Murphy Stadium; Attendance: 5,743

=== Playoffs ===
==== Conference Quarterfinals – vs Toronto (N7) ====
August 9, 1978	Vancouver Whitecaps	4 – 0	Toronto Metros-Croatia	Vancouver
	Bobby Campbell 17'; Alan Hinton 18'; Bob Lenarduzzi	Report		Stadium: Empire Stadium; Attendance: 30,811

==== Conference Semifinals – vs Portland (N4) ====
August 12, 1978 Game 1	Vancouver Whitecaps	0 – 1	Portland Timbers	Vancouver
		Report	Clyde Best	Stadium: Empire Stadium; Attendance: 16,437

August 16, 1978 Game 2	Portland Timbers	2 – 1	Vancouver Whitecaps	Portland, Oregon
	Clyde Best 17'; Willie Anderson	Report	Steve Kember	Stadium: Civic Stadium; Attendance: 32,266

== See also ==
- History of Vancouver Whitecaps FC
- 1978 North American Soccer League season
