= Nover =

Nover is a surname. Notable people with the surname include:

- Matt Nover (born 1970), American basketball player
- Peter Nover (born 1949), German soccer player
- Phillipe Nover (born 1984), American mixed martial artist
