= Phil Parkes =

Phil Parkes may refer to:

- Phil Parkes (footballer, born 1947) (1947–2026), English-born goalkeeper for Wolverhampton Wanderers and various clubs in the NASL
- Phil Parkes (footballer, born 1950), English international goalkeeper who played for Queens Park Rangers and West Ham United
