= Soccer Bowl '79 =

Soccer match

- Event: Soccer Bowl
| Vancouver Whitecaps | Tampa Bay Rowdies |
| 2 | 1 |
- Date: September 8, 1979
- Venue: Giants Stadium, East Rutherford, New Jersey
- Man of the Match: Alan Ball
- Referee: Gino D'Ippolito (United States)
- Attendance: 50,699

Soccer Bowl '79 was the championship final of the 1979 NASL season. The National Conference champion Vancouver Whitecaps played the American Conference champion Tampa Bay Rowdies. The match was played on September 8, 1979, at Giants Stadium, in East Rutherford, New Jersey. This was the second straight year that Giants Stadium hosted the Soccer Bowl. The Whitecaps won the match, 2–1, to claim their first North American championship.

== Background ==
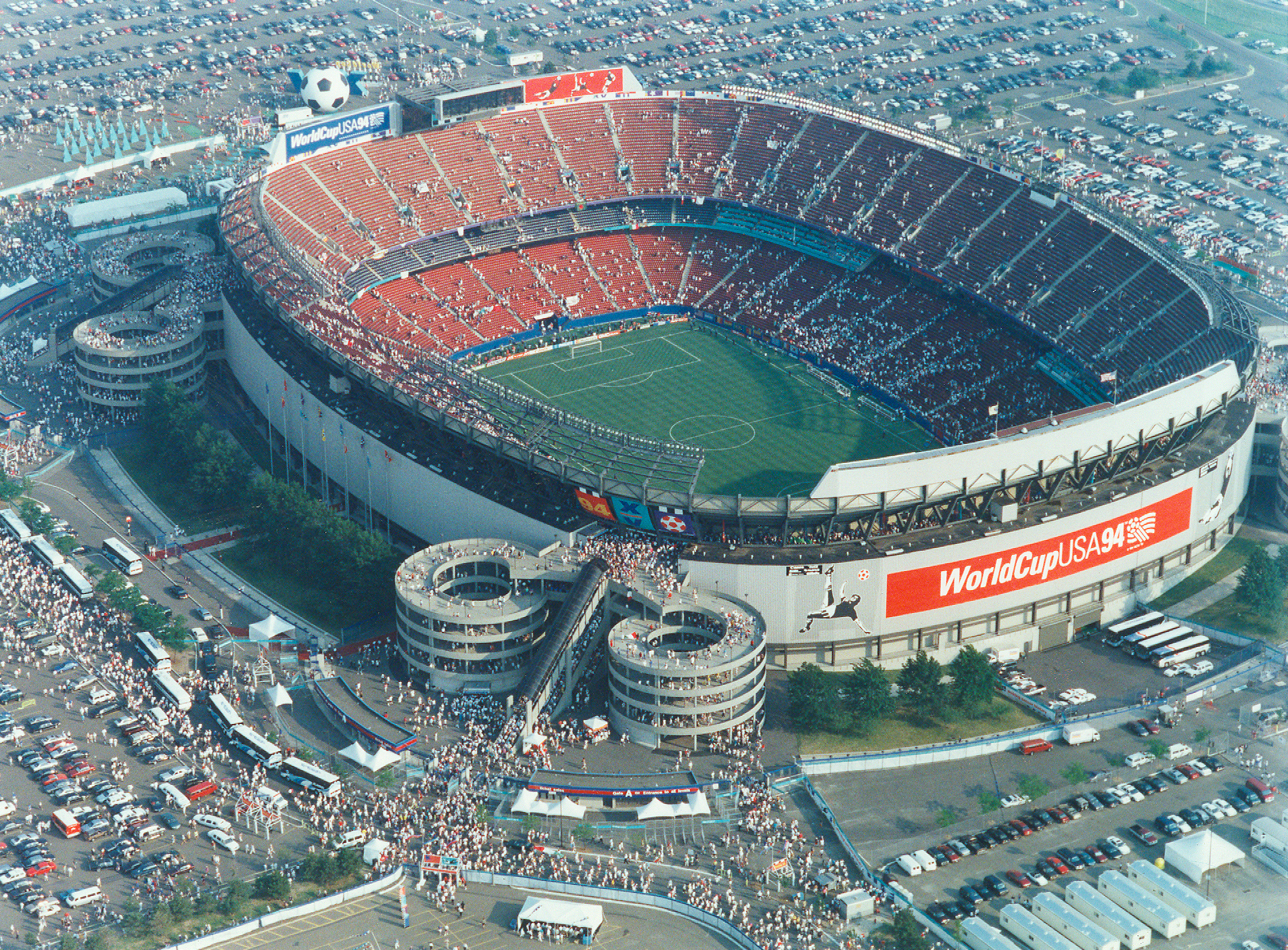
Giants Stadium was the venue for Soccer Bowl '79

=== Vancouver Whitecaps ===
The Vancouver Whitecaps qualified for the playoffs by virtue of winning the Western Division of the National Conference with 172 points. The Whitecaps defeated the Dallas Tornado in a first round series, two games to none. The first leg was played on August 15, 1979, in Dallas. The 'Caps won the match, 3–2. The return leg was played in Vancouver on August 18, 1979, before 30,328 fans. The home side did not disappoint, delivering a series winning, 2–1, victory.

In the conference semifinal series they went up against a divisional foe that knew them well, the Los Angeles Aztecs. Game 1 of the series proved to be their biggest test yet. When regulation ended the teams were level at 2–2. After 15 minutes of scoreless golden goal extra time the teams moved on to an NASL shoot-out, which the Aztecs won, 2–1. With their backs against the wall in Game 2, the Whitecaps delivered a gritty, 1–0, victory to tie the series at one game apiece. The squads took a 10-minute intermission before returning to the pitch to play a 30-minute mini-game tie breaker. Vancouver won it, 1–0, sending 32,375 fans home happy and themselves into the National Conference finals.

In what would prove to be one of the most memorable series in NASL history, they faced the defending champion and number one seeded New York Cosmos. The first game was played in Vancouver on August 29, 1979, before 32,875. The Whitecaps top defense stymied the high powered Cosmos' attack to the tune of 2–0. The second leg was played at Giants Stadium on September 1, 1979, with 44,109 in the stands and millions more watching the nationally televised match on ABC. The affair was a dogfight that saw Willie Johnston level the score at 2–2 with a diving header the 85th minute to force extra time.

The Cosmos won a shootout, 3–1, after neither team was able to break through in the 15 minutes of extra time. This tied the series at 1 game apiece, and set the stage for another 30-minute mini-game. In the mini-game each teamed thought they'd taken the lead, only to have referee Toros Kaibritjain wave off the goal. And so, after another scoreless 30 minutes, a shootout was again the order of the day. This time it however, it was Vancouver who would come out on top, 3–2, to win the National Conference title and earn a hard-fought, well-deserved spot in the Soccer Bowl.

=== Tampa Bay Rowdies ===
The Tampa Bay Rowdies' road to the finals, though not nearly as bumpy as Vancouver's, had its challenges as well. Tampa Bay qualified for the playoffs by virtue of winning the Eastern Division of the American Conference with 169 points. The Rowdies easily dispatched the Detroit Express in a first round series, two games to none. The first leg was played in the climate-controlled Pontiac Silverdome on August 15, 1979. The Rowdies won convincingly that evening, 3–0. The return leg was played at Tampa Stadium in the afternoon heat of August 19, 1979, before 27,210 fans. The Rowdies again proved to be too much for the Express, delivering a series winning, 3–1, victory.

In the conference semifinal series they went up against the upstart Philadelphia Fury, who had coolly swept the number one seeded Houston Hurricane out of the playoffs. On the evening of August 23, 1979, after four second-half goals, game 1 of the series ended level at 2–2. Following a scoreless overtime period, the teams moved to a shoot-out, which the Rowdies won, 2–0. Game 2 was played on a hot and muggy Florida afternoon before 21,112 sweat-drenched fans, with national television coverage from ABC. Tampa Bay counter punched their way to a 1–0 victory on Steve Wegerle's goal and Željko Bilecki's save of a late penalty kick on August 23, 1979. The win propelled them into the American Conference finals.

Their opponent for this series was the Western Division winner, San Diego Sockers, whom the Rowdies had eliminated the previous year via the mini-game. The Sockers took game 1 on August 30, 1979, at home, by the score of 2–1. When the teams returned to Tampa, the pressure was squarely on the Rowdies' shoulders. In a match played under threat of cancellation due to Hurricane David on September 2, 1979, and reminiscent of the previous day's Whitecaps-Cosmos tilt, 38,766 fans witnessed a 2–2 draw that needed a shoot-out to break the deadlock. Tampa Bay wasted no time converting their first three shots, while goalie Winston DuBose snuffed out all three Sockers' attempts.

The ensuing 30-minute mini-game had early drama as the diminutive Ivica Grnja scored in the third minute, just 27 seconds after entering the match as a substitute for the injured John Gorman. From there the Rowdies hung on the rest of the way for a 1–0 win, the American Conference title, and their second straight trip to the Soccer Bowl.

=== Results summary ===
| Vancouver Whitecaps | | | | Phase | Tampa Bay Rowdies | | | |
|---|---|---|---|---|---|---|---|---|
| West division: 1st place National Conference: 3rd seed NC West Division: Pos / Team / Pld / BP / Pts; 1 / Vancouver Whitecaps / 30 / 52 / 172; 2 / Los Angeles Aztecs / 30 / 54 / 162; 3 / Seattle Sounders / 30 / 47 / 125; 4 / Portland Timbers / 30 / 56 / 122; Updated to match(es) played on September 2, 1979. Source: Overall standings -Playoffs via division standings. -Playoffs via wildcard. National Conference playoff seeds: Pos / Team / Pld / BP / Pts; 1 / New York Cosmos / 30 / 72 / 216; 2 / Minnesota Kicks / 30 / 58 / 184; 3 / Vancouver Whitecaps (N) / 30 / 52 / 172; 4 / Washington Diplomats / 30 / 58 / 172; 5 / Los Angeles Aztecs / 30 / 54 / 162; 6 / Dallas Tornado / 30 / 50 / 152; 7 / Tulsa Roughnecks / 30 / 55 / 139; 8 / Toronto Blizzard / 30 / 49 / 133; Updated to match(es) played on September 2, 1979. Source: Overall standings (N) Conference champion -Division winner -Division runner-up -Wildcard team. | | | | Regular season | East division: 1st place American Conference: 2nd seed AC East Division: Pos / Team / Pld / BP / Pts; 1 / Tampa Bay Rowdies / 30 / 55 / 169; 2 / Fort Lauderdale Strikers / 30 / 63 / 165; 3 / Philadelphia Fury / 30 / 51 / 111; 4 / New England Tea Men / 30 / 38 / 110; Updated to match(es) played on September 2, 1979. Source: Overall standings -Playoffs via division standings. -Playoffs via wildcard. American Conference playoff seeds: Pos / Team / Pld / BP / Pts; 1 / Houston Hurricane / 30 / 55 / 187; 2 / Tampa Bay Rowdies (A) / 30 / 55 / 169; 3 / San Diego Sockers / 30 / 50 / 140; 4 / Fort Lauderdale Strikers / 30 / 63 / 165; 5 / Chicago Sting / 30 / 63 / 159; 6 / California Surf / 30 / 50 / 140; 7 / Detroit Express / 30 / 48 / 132; 8 / Philadelphia Fury / 30 / 51 / 111; Updated to match(es) played on September 2, 1979. Source: Overall standings (A) Conference champion -Division winner -Division runner-up -Wildcard team. | | | |
| Opponent | Game 1 | Game 2 | Mini-game | Playoffs | Opponent | Game 1 | Game 2 | Mini-game |
| Dallas Tornado | 3–2 (A) | 2–1 (H) | — | Conference Quarterfinals | Detroit Express | 3–0 (A) | 3–1 (H) | — |
| Los Angeles Aztecs | 2–2 (SO: 1–2) (A) | 1–0 (H) | 1–0 (H) | Conference Semifinals | Philadelphia Fury | 2–2 (SO: 3–2) (A) | 1–0 (H) | — |
| New York Cosmos | 2–0 (H) | 2–2 (SO: 1–3) (A) | 0–0 (SO: 3–2) (A) | Conference Championships | San Diego Sockers | 1–2 (A) | 2–2 (SO: 3–0) (H) | 1–0 (H) |

== Match details ==
September 8
2:00 p.m. EDT

| Vancouver Whitecaps | 2–1 | Tampa Bay Rowdies |
|---|---|---|
| Whymark 13', 60' | Report | Van der Veen 23' |

Giants Stadium, East Rutherford
Attendance: 50,699
Referee: Gino D'Ippolito (United States)

| Vancouver Whitecaps | Tampa Bay Rowdies |

| GK | 1 | (England) Phil Parkes |
| DF | 7 | (Canada) Buzz Parsons | (substituted off) 69:42 |
| DF | 4 | (England) John Craven (c) |
| DF | 6 | (England) Roger Kenyon |
| DF | 5 | (Canada) Bob Lenarduzzi |
| MF | 2 | (England) Ray Lewington |
| MF | 23 | (England) Alan Ball |
| MF | 21 | (England) Carl Valentine |
| FW | 11 | (England) Kevin Hector |
| FW | 9 | (England) Trevor Whymark |
| FW | 20 | (Scotland) Willie Johnston |
Substitutes:
| MF | 10 | (Canada) Bob Bolitho | (substituted on) 69:42 |
| GK | 22 | (Zimbabwe Rhodesia) Bruce Grobbelaar |
| DF | 17 | (England) Peter Daniel |
| MF | 8 | (England) Jon Sammels |
Manager:
(England) Tony Waiters

| GK | 2 | (Canada) Željko Bilecki |
| D | 3 | (Scotland) John Gorman | (yellow card) 85:07 |
| DF | 22 | (England) Barry Kitchener |
| DF | 6 | (South Africa) Mike Connell | (yellow card) 66:24 |
| DF | 21 | (England) Manny Andruszewski |
| MF | 9 | (England) Peter Anderson |
| MF | 5 | (Netherlands) Jan van der Veen | (yellow card) 78:41 |
| MF | 8 | (Canada) Wes McLeod |
| FW | 7 | (South Africa) Steve Wegerle | | (substituted off) 70:50 |
| FW | 20 | (Chile) Oscar Fabbiani | (yellow card) 86:43 |
| FW | 10 | (England) Rodney Marsh (c) | (yellow card) 33:37 | (substituted off) 78:37 |
Substitutes:
| MF | 15 | (Socialist Federal Republic of Yugoslavia) Petar Baralić | | (substituted on) 70:50 |
| FW | 23 | (Socialist Federal Republic of Yugoslavia) Ivica Grnja | | (substituted on) 78:37 |
| GK | 1 | (United States) Winston DuBose |
| DF | 16 | (England) Farrukh Quraishi |
| MF | 12 | (United States) Perry Van der Beck |
Manager:
(England) Gordon Jago

1979 NASL Champions: Vancouver Whitecaps

Soccer Bowl MVP:
Alan Ball (Vancouver)
Assistant referees:
(United States) John Davies
(Canada) Derek Smith

Television: ABC (Simulcast on CTV in Canada)
Announcers: Jim McKay, Paul Gardner

=== Statistics ===
Overall Totals
| Statistic | Vancouver | Tampa Bay |
|---|---|---|
| Goals scored | 2 | 1 |
| Total shots | 13 | 10 |
| Shots on target | 6 | 6 |
| Saves | 5 | 4 |
| Corner kicks | 7 | 8 |
| Fouls | 29 | 16 |
| Offsides | 1 | 4 |
| Yellow cards | 0 | 5 |
| Red cards | 0 | 0 |

== See also ==
- 1979 North American Soccer League season
