= List of Vancouver Whitecaps FC seasons =

Vancouver Whitecaps FC is a soccer team based in Vancouver, Canada, that plays in Major League Soccer (MLS) and other soccer competitions. The team's original namesake played in the North American Soccer League from 1974 to 1984. The club was revived two years later as the Vancouver 86ers and later the Whitecaps from 2001 onward, playing in the second division of American soccer for most of their existence. An MLS expansion team was awarded to Vancouver and began play in 2011 under the Whitecaps name. In addition to league play, Vancouver also competes in annual domestic and international tournaments and can qualify for the CONCACAF Champions Cup.

== Key ==
Key to competitions

- Major League Soccer (MLS) – The top-flight of soccer in the United States, established in 1996.
- Canadian Championship (CC) – The premier knockout cup competition in Canadian soccer, first contested in 2008.
- CONCACAF Champions League (CCL) – The premier competition in North American soccer since 1962. It went by the name of Champions' Cup until 2008.
- Leagues Cup (LC) – A secondary competition in North American soccer since 2019, contested by teams from Major League Soccer and Liga MX.

Key to colours and symbols

1st or W	Winners
2nd or RU	Runners-up
3rd	Third place
SF or 4th	Semi-finalist
Last	Wooden Spoon
♦	MLS Golden Boot
	Highest average attendance
Italics	Ongoing competition

Key to league record

- Season = The year and article of the season
- Div = Division/level on pyramid
- League = League name
- Pld = Games played
- W = Games won
- L = Games lost
- D = Games drawn
- GF = Goals scored
- GA = Goals against
- Pts = Points
- PPG = Points per game
- Conf. = Conference position
- Overall = League position

Key to cup record

- DNE = Did not enter
- DNQ = Did not qualify
- NH = Competition not held or cancelled
- QR = Qualifying round
- PR = Preliminary round
- GS = Group stage
- LP = League phase
- R1 = First round
- R2 = Second round
- R3 = Third round
- R4 = Fourth round
- R5 = Fifth round
- Ro16 = Round of 16
- QF = Quarter-finals
- SF = Semi-finals
- F = Final
- RU = Runners-up
- W = Winners

== Seasons ==
Season	League											Position		Playoffs	CC	International		Other		Average attendance (Note: Average attendance includes statistics from league matches only.)	Top goalscorer(s) (Note: Top goalscorer(s) includes all goals scored in the regular season, MLS Cup Playoffs, Canadian Championship, MLS is Back Tournament, CONCACAF Champions League, FIFA Club World Cup, and other competitive continental matches.)	
Season	Div	League	Pld	W	L	D	GF	GA	GD	Pts	PPG	Conf.	Overall	Playoffs	CC	CCC	LC	Other		Average attendance	Name(s)	Goals
2011	1	MLS	34	6	18	10	35	55	–20	28	0.82	9th	18th	DNQ	RU	DNQ	NH	—		20,412	(Brazil) Camilo Sanvezzo	13
2012	1	MLS	34	11	13	10	35	41	–6	43	1.26	5th	11th	R1	RU	DNQ	NH	—		19,475	(Jamaica) Darren Mattocks	8
2013	1	MLS	34	13	12	9	53	45	+8	48	1.41	7th	13th	DNQ	RU	DNQ	NH	—		20,038	(Brazil) Camilo Sanvezzo	25♦ (Note: Sanvezzo won the MLS Golden Boot (22 goals))
2014	1	MLS	34	12	8	14	42	40	+2	50	1.47	5th	9th	R1	SF	DNQ	NH	—		20,408	(Chile) Pedro Morales	9
2015	1	MLS	34	16	13	5	45	36	+9	53	1.56	2nd	3rd	QF	W	GS	NH	—		20,507	(Uruguay) Octavio Rivero	10
2016	1	MLS	34	10	15	9	45	52	–7	39	1.15	8th	16th	DNQ	RU	SF	NH	—		22,330	(Chile) Pedro Morales	9
2017	1	MLS	34	15	12	7	50	49	+1	52	1.53	3rd	8th	QF	SF	NH	NH	—		21,416	(Colombia) Fredy Montero	15
2018	1	MLS	34	13	13	8	54	67	–13	47	1.38	8th	14th	DNQ	RU	DNQ	NH	—		21,946	(Sierra Leone) Kei Kamara	17
2019	1	MLS	34	8	16	10	37	59	–22	34	1.00	12th	23rd	DNQ	R3	DNQ	DNE	—		19,514	(Colombia) Fredy Montero	8
2020	1	MLS	23	9	14	0	27	44	–17	27	1.17	9th	17th	DNQ	DNQ	DNQ	NH	MLS is Back Tournament	Ro16	22,120 (Note: Does not include home matches played behind closed doors.)	(Canada) Lucas Cavallini	6
2021	1	MLS	34	12	9	13	45	45	0	49	1.44	6th	12th	R1	R1	DNQ	DNQ	—		12,492 (Note: Does not include home matches played in American stadiums.)	(Colombia) Cristian Dájome (United States) Brian White	12
2022	1	MLS	34	12	15	7	40	57	–17	43	1.26	9th	17th	DNQ	W	DNQ	DNE	—		18,643	(Canada) Lucas Cavallini	9
2023	1	MLS	34	12	10	12	55	48	+7	48	1.41	6th	13th	R1	W	QF	Ro32	—		16,745	(United States) Brian White	19
2024	1	MLS	34	13	13	8	52	49	+3	47	1.38	8th	14th	R1	W	R1	Ro32	—		26,121	(United States) Brian White	15
2025	1	MLS	34	18	7	9	66	38	+28	63	1.85	2nd	4th	RU	W	RU	DNE	—		21,806	(United States) Brian White	16
2026	1	MLS	34	19	8	7	74	34	40	64	1.88	1st	2nd	TBD	SF	Ro16	LP	—			(United States) Brian White	21
Total			499	180	188	131	681	725	–44	671	1.34	—	—	—	—	—	—	—	—	—	(United States) Brian White	101
