= Steve Nesin =

Canadian former soccer player (born 1960)

Personal information
- Date of birth: 17 April 1960 (age 66)
- Place of birth: Novi Sad, SFR Yugoslavia
- Position: Striker

Senior career*
Years	Team	Apps	(Gls)
1979–1980	Vancouver Whitecaps	4	(0)
1980–1982	San Diego Sockers (indoor)	72	(20)
1981–1984	San Diego Sockers	36	(1)
Total		112	(21)

International career
1978	Canada U20	3	(0)
1986	Canada	3	(0)
- * Club domestic league appearances and goals

Steve Nesin (born 17 April 1960) is a Canadian former soccer player who played at both professional and international levels as a striker.

== Early and personal life ==
Nesin was born in Novi Sad, SFR Yugoslavia.

== Career ==
=== Club career ===
Nesin played in the NASL for the Vancouver Whitecaps and the San Diego Sockers, also representing the latter in the Major Indoor Soccer League.

=== International career ===
Nesin earned three caps for the Canadian national side in 1986.
