= Trevor Whymark =

English footballer (1950–2024)

Personal information
- Full name: Trevor John Whymark
- Date of birth: 4 May 1950
- Place of birth: Burston, England
- Date of death: 31 October 2024 (aged 74)
- Position: Forward

Senior career*
Years	Team	Apps	(Gls)
- Diss Town
1969–1979	Ipswich Town	261	(75)
1979	→ Sparta Rotterdam (loan)	5	(0)
1979	Derby County	2	(0)
1979–1980	Vancouver Whitecaps	57	(25)
1980–1984	Grimsby Town	93	(16)
1984–1985	Southend United	39	(6)
1985	Peterborough United	3	(0)
- Diss Town
1985	Colchester United	2	(0)
- Diss Town
Total		462	(124)

International career
1973–1974	England U23	7	(3)
1977	England	1	(0)
- * Club domestic league appearances and goals

Trevor John Whymark (4 May 1950 – 31 October 2024) was an English professional footballer who played in the Football League in the 1970s and 1980s, notably with Ipswich Town. A forward, as of 2016, he is the team's sixth-highest goalscorer. He made one appearance for the England national team.

== Club career ==
=== Ipswich Town ===
Whymark started his football career with Anglian Combination team Diss Town whilst working his office job at a Diss builders' merchant and was signed by Bobby Robson in 1969. He made his Ipswich League debut in February 1970 against Manchester City. In the remaining part of the season, Whymark made six starts and two substitute appearances, scoring his first and only goal in a vital 2–0 victory over fellow relegation strugglers Sunderland.

The following season, Whymark only recorded eight starts with two substitute appearances and a single goal (in a 4–0 victory over Manchester United). It would appear this was a season cut short by injury as all of these games were played before 10 October. Whymark also played in goal following an injury to goalkeeper David Best in a game against West Bromwich Albion.

During the 1971–72 season, Whymark was, bar an early substitute appearance, absent from the first team until February 1972. After that, he had a run of 13 games, one as substitute, in which he scored four goals. He had struck up a useful relationship with Rod Belfitt, who had joined the club from Leeds United in November.

At the beginning of the 1972–73 season, Robson gave Whymark a chance to establish himself as Belfitt's striking partner, and the partnership scored ten goals, with Whymark contributing three. Belfitt, Ipswich's top scorer at the time, was exchanged for young Everton striker David Johnson. Whymark went on to score another eight league goals that season, finishing as joint-top scorer with attacking midfielder Bryan Hamilton on eleven goals. Whymark also scored five goals in Ipswich's successful Texaco Cup campaign, including one in the second leg of the final against local rivals Norwich City.

Finishing fourth in the First Division in the previous season meant that Ipswich could compete in the UEFA Cup. After an aggregate 1–0 first-round victory against Real Madrid, a 4–0 first-leg victory over Italian team Lazio at Portman Road followed, in which Whymark scored each of the goals. Before the return match, he was presented with a trophy from some AS Roma supporters, which infuriated the Lazio fans and ensured the second leg in Italy was played in a hostile atmosphere. In a 2007 interview, Whymark stated he had left the pitch carrying an iron bar for protection. Whymark scored one further UEFA Cup goal, against Twente Enscehde. Meanwhile, in the league Whymark scored eleven goals in 39 games, plus a further goal in the League Cup.

Whymark was joint-top league scorer (with Bryan Hamilton) in the 1974–75 season with ten goals from 40 games, supplemented by an FA Cup and three League Cup goals.

The following 1975–76 season, Whymark scored 13 league and two UEFA cup goals. For the second season in succession, he represented Ipswich in all but two of their 42 league games.

During the close season Whymark's striking partner David Johnson was transferred to Liverpool. In his place, Paul Mariner was signed from Plymouth Argyle but on his debut against West Bromwich Albion it was Whymark who scored four goals in a 7–0 victory (Mariner also scored). Whymark scored 14 league goals in 36 appearances during the 1976–77 season, including a hat-trick against Norwich City, resulting in his being the top scorer again. In other competitions, Whymark managed a goal in the FA Cup.

A serious knee injury limited Whymark to 19 league appearances with nine goals in 1977. This still meant he was Ipswich's second-highest scorer behind Mariner and was supplemented by five League Cup goals in three games. In the UEFA Cup, Whymark managed six appearances and six goals, including his third instance of four goals in a game against Landskrona BoIS. Ipswich won the FA Cup in 1978 but Whymark played no part in their route to the final, and missed the final itself due to a knee injury. The following 1978–79 season saw an injury-ridden Whymark limited to eight league appearances with a single goal (against Liverpool). He did play in three FA Cup, one League Cup and three European Cup Winners Cup games. This proved to be the last season Whymark played for Ipswich Town. In a 2007 interview, he spoke of his relationship with Bobby Robson: "We didn't have the best of relationships on a personal level but I think he respected me for what I could do and how I did it. And I respected him for what he's achieved and how's it done, so there was a mutual respect in football terms. I never sat down and had a conversation with him about anything other than football." Following his release from Ipswich, Whymark joined Derby County, where he was limited to just two appearances before contracting glandular fever, which affected his fitness. He left Derby to play in Canada with Vancouver Whitecaps.

=== Vancouver Whitecaps ===
In 1979, Whymark moved to play for Vancouver Whitecaps of the North American Soccer League, and during his two seasons in Canada he scored 25 goals in 57 games. He scored both goals, including the game winner in the 60th minute, of Vancouver's 2–1 Soccer Bowl victory over the Tampa Bay Rowdies in 1979.

=== Return to the UK ===
After that, he had Football League spells with Grimsby Town, Southend United, Peterborough United and Colchester United.

== International career ==
Whymark was first picked for the England Under-23 team to play in a match against Netherlands on 2 January 1973, with Whymark scoring a goal in a 3–1 victory played at Highbury. He featured in six Under-23 games up to June that season, scoring against Scotland in a 2–1 away victory at Rugby Park, Kilmarnock, and against Denmark in a 1–1 draw. After that, he featured in one more game on 19 January 1974, in which England beat Portugal 3–2 in the Benfica Stadium.

Whymark played a single game for England national team against Luxembourg in 1977.

== Post-playing career ==
After retiring from the professional game, Whymark spent a year as player-manager with Diss Town. In 1999–2000, he became coach of Norwich City's under-13 side, and he then returned to Ipswich Town to perform a similar role with their under-12 side.

On 21 April 2023, Whymark's family announced he had been diagnosed with Alzheimer's disease. He died on 31 October 2024, at the age of 74.

== Honours ==
Ipswich Town

- Texaco Cup: 1973

Vancouver Whitecaps

- NASL 1979

Grimsby Town

- Football League Group Cup: 1981–82

Individual

- Ipswich Town Hall of Fame: inducted 2012
