= Wayne Jentas =

Canadian retired soccer midfielder (born 1954)

Personal information
- Date of birth: 9 May 1954 (age 72)
- Place of birth: Toronto, Ontario, Canada
- Position: Midfielder

Senior career*
Years	Team	Apps	(Gls)
1978	Vancouver Whitecaps	4	(0)
1979	Rochester Lancers	1	(0)
1980	Columbus Magic		
1980–1981	Cleveland Force (indoor)	38	(4)
1981–	Canton Invaders (indoor)		

Managerial career
- 1984–1985: Canton Invaders (assistant)
- 1991–1992: Cleveland Crunch (assistant)
- 1993: Denver Thunder
- College of Wooster
- * Club domestic league appearances and goals

Wayne Jentas is a Canadian retired soccer midfielder who played in the North American Soccer League, American Soccer League, Major Indoor Soccer League and American Indoor Soccer Association. He later coached at the youth, college and professional levels.

== Player ==
Although born in Canada, Jentas spent most of his youth in Derby, England. He began playing in 1972. In 1978, he signed with the Vancouver Whitecaps of the North American Soccer League. In 1979, he moved to the Rochester Lancers. In 1980, he played for the Columbus Magic in the American Soccer League. In the fall of 1980, he signed with the Cleveland Force of the Major Indoor Soccer League. After one season, he moved to the Canton Invaders of the American Indoor Soccer Association.

== Coach ==
Since retirement he has coached at numerous teams. From 1982 to 1986, he was the junior varsity soccer coach at Hudson High School. During this time, he also spent one season, 1984–1985, as an assistant with the Canton Invaders. On 11 October 1991, he was named an assistant coach with the Cleveland Crunch. On 26 February 1993, Jentas replaced Paul Kitson as head coach of the Denver Thunder. He later coached the College of Wooster soccer team. He has also coached the East-West Premier Soccer Club. He is currently the Director of Pennine United.
