= Vancouver Whitecaps FC =

Canadian professional soccer club based in Vancouver

- Nicknames: The Blue-and-White; The Village; The Caps
- Founded: March 18, 1974; 52 years ago (Note: Original team founded in 1973. MLS franchise granted in 2009.)
- Stadium: BC Place, Vancouver, British Columbia
- Capacity: 27,695 (Note: Capacity lowered for most games by closing off the upper deck. Full capacity of 54,313 used on occasion.)
- Owners: Greg Kerfoot; Steve Luczo; Jeff Mallett; Steve Nash
- Chairman: Jeff Mallett
- Sporting director: Axel Schuster
- Coach: Jesper Sørensen
- League: Major League Soccer
- 2026: Western Conference: 1st Overall: 2nd Playoffs: TBD
- Website: whitecapsfc.com
Home colours	Away colours	Third colours

Vancouver Whitecaps Football Club is a Canadian professional soccer club based in Vancouver. The Whitecaps compete in Major League Soccer (MLS) as a member of the Western Conference. The club was founded on March 18, 2009, and began play in 2011 as the 17th team to enter Major League Soccer. They are a phoenix club and the third team to use the "Whitecaps" name, which originated in 1974 as a member of the North American Soccer League and was revived in 2001 for a second-division team that last played in the 2010 USSF Division 2. The club has been owned and managed by the same group since they were a second-division franchise.

In the 2012 season, the team became the first Canadian team to qualify for the MLS Cup playoffs. The Whitecaps have won five Canadian Championships, and have advanced to both the CONCACAF Champions Cup and MLS Cup finals in 2025, losing to Cruz Azul and Inter Miami respectively. Vancouver competes against longtime Pacific Northwest rivals Seattle and Portland in the Cascadia Cup, a fan-created trophy awarded based on MLS regular season results.

In 2025, the Whitecaps attracted international attention for the signing of German superstar and 2014 FIFA World Cup winner Thomas Müller on a free transfer. Other notable Whitecaps players include former American international Jay DeMerit, the club's first player and captain; Camilo Sanvezzo, the 2013 MLS Golden Boot winner; and current Canadian men's national team captain Alphonso Davies, a homegrown player.

== History ==
An ownership group in Vancouver were granted the seventeenth Major League Soccer franchise on March 18, 2009, by MLS commissioner Don Garber. While no name was provided at the Vancouver announcement, over a year later the club confirmed it would keep the Whitecaps name, which had been first used in 1974. The original Whitecaps played from 1974 to 1984 in the North American Soccer League and won one league championship, Soccer Bowl '79. After the league folded, a new team named the Vancouver 86ers was founded in 1986 and played in various minor leagues. It adopted the Whitecaps name in 2001.

The team sold the first 5,000 season ticket deposits 48 hours after they became available to the public. Remaining season tickets were made available to season ticket holders for the USSF 2 Whitecaps before becoming available to non-season ticket holders. In preparation for its first MLS season, the Whitecaps brought in executive talent from around the world. On November 24, 2009, Paul Barber, former Tottenham Hotspur executive, was announced to join the club as CEO. Others joining him included former D.C. United head coach Tom Soehn as Director of Operations and Dutch national Richard Grootscholten as the Technical Director and head coach of the residency program.

As the head coach of the USL and later USSF Division 2 Vancouver Whitecaps, former Iceland international Teitur Thordarson was confirmed as head coach on September 2, 2010, for the inaugural MLS season. He was subsequently relieved of his duties on May 30, 2011, after the Whitecaps won just one of their first twelve matches. Tom Soehn, the Whitecaps director of soccer operations, replaced Thordarson on an interim basis.

=== First years ===
The Whitecaps began playing in the 2011 MLS season with their first match on March 19, 2011, against rival Canadians Toronto FC, which they won 4–2. The first goal in the Whitecaps' MLS era was scored by Eric Hassli. After their winning start the Whitecaps struggled, and failed to secure another victory in their next 11 MLS games, drawing six and losing five. In the aftermath of their 1–1 draw with the New York Red Bulls on May 30 head coach Teitur Thordarson was fired. Tom Soehn took over coaching duties for the remainder of the 2011 season, while Martin Rennie was announced as the new permanent head coach on August 9, taking over officially on November 2. The team managed to attract 15,500 season ticket holders in its first MLS season and 13,000 for the second.

On March 3, 2012, the Whitecaps won their first minor, pre-season cup at the 2012 Walt Disney World Pro Soccer Classic defeating Toronto FC 1–0 thanks to a goal by Camilo Sanvezzo. The Whitecaps finished the regular season with 11 wins, 3 losses, and 10 ties positioning the club, fifth in the Western Conference and 11th on the league overall table. On October 21, 2012, the Whitecaps became the first Canadian team to earn a spot in the MLS playoffs. Vancouver were eliminated in the knockout round.

In the 2013 season, Vancouver finished in seventh in the Western Conference, 13th in the league table with 13 wins, 12 losses, and 9 ties in the regular season. They were not able to qualify for the post season, in the playoffs as they had accomplished in the season prior. Two days after the end of the 2013 MLS regular season, Rennie's contract was not renewed sparking a search for the next head coach. In their off-season, the Whitecaps were in the midst of controversy with one of their then players, Camilo, who had played for the team since their inaugural campaign, after the Brazilian went on to join Liga MX club Querétaro. The Mexican club believed that he was no longer under contract, while the Whitecaps reported that he was still on a contract with Vancouver. The scandal was resolved with the Liga MX club paying a transfer fee from Vancouver to acquire the Brazilian forward.

In October 2014, the Whitecaps qualified for the 2015–16 CONCACAF Champions League for the first time as a result of becoming the highest ranked Canadian team in the 2014 MLS season and due to a reformatting of the Canadian Championship in the following season. A week later they qualified for the MLS playoffs for the second time, an achievement unmatched by any Canadian team.

=== First continental seasons ===
In 2015, the Whitecaps would go on to have their best-ever regular season, finishing the season with 53 points. They also went on to win the Canadian Championship for the first time, defeating Montreal 2–0 in the second leg to win the final 4–2 on aggregate. In the 2015 MLS Cup Playoffs and 2014–15 CONCACAF Champions League, however, they did not achieve the same success, getting eliminated in the group stage of the CONCACAF Champions League and the conference semi-final of the playoffs.

In 2016, the Whitecaps took a step back, finishing the regular season with 39 points. In the 2016 Canadian Championship, they reached the final, but lost 2–2 on away goals to Toronto FC. They did go on to win the Cascadia Cup on the final day of the regular season, beating the Portland Timbers 4–1.

During the year of 2017, there were major improvement for the Whitecaps, as they made the CONCACAF Champions League semi-finals for the first time, but were eliminated by Tigres UANL. They finished the regular season with 52 points, making the playoffs for the fourth time in their history. However, despite recording their first-ever playoff win against the San Jose Earthquakes in the knockout round, they were eliminated by Seattle Sounders FC in the conference semi-final.

In 2018, the Whitecaps would record the fourth-worst defensive record of the season, conceding 67 goals. As a result of poor form in the regular season, coach Carl Robinson was relieved of his duties on September 25, 2018. He was replaced by interim Craig Dalrymple for the remainder of the regular season. The Whitecaps finished the season with 47 points and would miss the playoffs for the second time in three seasons.

2019 saw a new-look squad for the Whitecaps, as key players like Alphonso Davies, Kendall Waston, Kei Kamara, and Cristian Techera had all departed following the 2018 season. The team would also appoint a new manager prior to the season, naming Marc Dos Santos to take the club forward. However, they would once again go on to miss the playoffs, finishing the season last place in the Western Conference. They were also eliminated by Cavalry FC in the 2019 Canadian Championship, becoming the first MLS team to get eliminated by a Canadian Premier League side in Canadian Championship history.

=== 2020–2024 ===
2020 was the club's 10th season in Major League Soccer. However, on March 12, 2020, after only two games played, Major League Soccer suspended their season as a result of the COVID-19 pandemic. The Whitecaps' season resumed on July 15, 2020, when they played the San Jose Earthquakes in their first match of the MLS is Back Tournament. Despite losses to the San Jose Earthquakes and Seattle Sounders FC, a 2–0 win against the Chicago Fire was enough for the team to qualify to the round of 16. However, the Whitecaps would ultimately lose to Sporting Kansas City 3–1 on penalties after a scoreless 120 minutes. From August 18 to September 16, 2020, the Whitecaps would play six matches against fellow Canadian MLS teams Toronto FC and Montreal Impact, that would serve as both regular season matches as well as qualifiers for the 2020 Canadian Championship. The Whitecaps would not qualify for the Canadian Championship, finishing at the bottom of the qualification table with only 6 points from 6 games. From September 19, 2020, until the end of the season, the Whitecaps would play the rest of their home matches at Providence Park in Portland, Oregon. They would finish the season with 27 points from 23 matches played, missing the playoffs for the third season in a row.

2021 saw much greater success for the Whitecaps. The season did not start off well initially, with head coach Marc Dos Santos being relieved of his duties on August 27, 2021, as a result of his team sitting below the playoff line after 20 games, as well as once again getting eliminated by Pacific FC in the 2021 Canadian Championship. However, under interim head coach Vanni Sartini, the team would go unbeaten in 12 of their last 14 games to finish the season, making the playoffs for the first time in four years. In the playoffs, the Whitecaps were eliminated in the first round by Sporting Kansas City, losing by a scoreline of 3–1. On November 30, 2021, Sartini was named as the club's new head coach.

In 2022, the Whitecaps would go on to have mixed success. They missed the playoffs for the fourth time in five years, finishing the season with 43 points. However, they won the 2022 Canadian Championship, beating Toronto FC 5–3 on penalties after a 1–1 draw following regulation and extra time. It was the first time that the Whitecaps won the Canadian Championship since their first victory in 2015. The Canadian Championship victory also meant that the Whitecaps would qualify for the 2023 CONCACAF Champions League.

In the 2023 CONCACAF Champions League, the Whitecaps defeated Real C.D. España to advance to the quarterfinals, but were ultimately eliminated by Los Angeles FC. In the regular season, the team would finish with 48 points, qualifying for the playoffs. They were once again eliminated by Los Angeles FC, in a two-game sweep. In the 2023 Leagues Cup, their inaugural appearance in the competition, the Whitecaps advanced to the Round of 32, but were eliminated by Tigres UANL. For the second consecutive season, the Whitecaps won the Canadian Championship for the third time, beating CF Montréal 2–1 in the final. As a result, they qualified for the 2024 CONCACAF Champions Cup.

The 2024 CONCACAF Champions Cup saw the Whitecaps face Tigres UANL, a team that the Whitecaps previously lost to 4–1 on aggregate in the 2016–17 edition. The Whitecaps would once again get eliminated by the Liga MX side, by the same 4–1 aggregate scoreline. In the regular season, the team finished with 47 points, qualifying for the wild-card round of the playoffs where they defeated the Portland Timbers in their wild-card match 5–0. In a Round 1 rematch with Los Angeles FC, the Whitecaps were again eliminated, this time in three games. In the 2024 Leagues Cup, the Whitecaps advanced to the Round of 32 before being eliminated by Pumas UNAM. The Whitecaps won their third consecutive Canadian Championship, winning the 2024 Canadian Championship by defeating Toronto FC 4–2 on penalties after a scoreless draw, qualifying them for the 2025 CONCACAF Champions Cup.

=== 2025 season: Three finals ===
The Whitecaps began the 2025 CONCACAF Champions Cup with a 3–2 aggregate win over Costa Rican side Saprissa. In the Round of 16, they met CF Monterrey led by Sergio Ramos and advanced on away goals (3–3 agg.). They also defeated their quarterfinals opponent UNAM by virtue of away goals (3–3 agg.), after a late stoppage-time equalizer by Tristan Blackmon. Facing the MLS Supporters Shield holders Inter Miami CF, a star-studded side led by Lionel Messi, The Whitecaps upset Miami by winning 5–1 on aggregate, advancing to their first-ever Champions Cup final. The Whitecaps traveled to Mexico City and lost 5–0 to Cruz Azul in the match.

The 2025 Canadian Championship final was held on October 1, 2025, at BC Place in Vancouver, where Vancouver Whitecaps FC defeated Vancouver FC 4–2 to claim their fourth consecutive Voyageurs Cup, the longest championship streak in the tournament's modern era. Midfielder Ali Ahmed was named tournament MVP after scoring twice in the final, while Thomas Müller added a goal and an assist, marking the 300th goal of his career and the 35th trophy of his career, making him the most decorated German footballer of all time. Team captain Ryan Gauld, returning from a seven-month injury absence, sealed the victory with the Whitecaps' fourth goal. Despite goals from Thierno Bah and Nicolás Mezquida for Vancouver FC, the Whitecaps dominated possession and outshot their Canadian Premier League opponents 20–4.

The club had their most successful regular season to date in the MLS-era. On August 6, 2025, the Whitecaps gained international attention due to the signing of German superstar and 2014 FIFA World Cup winner Thomas Müller in free agency after a storied 17-season club career at Bayern Munich, being a key centrepiece towards the team's multiple trophies. Boosted by the addition of Müller, the Whitecaps went on a ten-game unbeaten streak in all competitions, ending with a 1–2 loss to FC Dallas at home in the final regular season match of the season. The Whitecaps finished the 2025 regular season with a MLS-era record 63 points, maintaining a top-3 position in the Western Conference during the entire season. After sweeping FC Dallas in Round 1 of the 2025 MLS Cup playoffs, the Whitecaps hosted a memorable conference semifinals match versus Los Angeles FC, who eliminated Vancouver from the playoffs the previous two years. With an MLS-era record 53,957 fans in attendance, the Whitecaps defeated LAFC in penalties despite Vancouver playing two men short for the final 11 minutes of stoppage time following a red card to Tristan Blackmon and an injury to Belal Halbouni. The Whitecaps won their first Western Conference title, defeating expansion club San Diego FC in the conference finals to advance to their first MLS Cup, where they lost to Inter Miami 1–3.

== Colours and badge ==
On June 8, 2010, it was officially announced the club would continue using the "Whitecaps" name, but with a redesigned logo. The name alludes to the geographic features surrounding the city: snow-capped mountains to the north and the Pacific Ocean's white-capped waves to the west.

The official club colours include navy blue ("deep sea"), white, and light blue ("Whitecaps blue"). The "deep sea" blue represents the maritime landscape of the Vancouver area and the "Whitecaps blue" indicates the reflection of the North Shore Mountains in the Pacific Ocean. The lighter shade of blue also alludes to the primary colour of the original Whitecaps, winners of Soccer Bowl 1979. The silver outline pays homage to the team's championship victories since 1974.

On June 10, 2010, the Whitecaps strip package was unveiled with Bell Canada serving as the inaugural jersey sponsor. The home shirt is white with horizontal, navy blue pinstripes; the stripes broaden slightly from bottom to top. The secondary shirt is deep blue with an embossed, interlocking diamond pattern which is also deep blue and is reflective in the light.

On June 14, 2012, the Whitecaps unveiled a third kit. The third kit is predominantly "arbutus brown", with sky blue accents, which reflects the unique land full of deep roots and the high-reaching arms of the temperate rainforests of British Columbia.

In 2019 they used a redesigned version of their 1979 kit as a 40th anniversary tribute to the team winning the 1979 NASL Soccer Bowl.

In 2023, the club unveiled the Bloodlines Jersey, highlighting "[the] powerful thread that connects us all". This highlighted a partnership with Telus to support Canadian Blood Services, including active community figures and blood donors such as Joban Bal among others involved in Canadian blood donation efforts.

In 2024, they released The 50 Jersey, on the club's 50th anniversary. This honoured the club's status as the longest running professional soccer club in Canada and the United States, creating a modern twist on the original crest during the inaugural season in 1974.

In 2026 the Whitecaps unveiled a third jersey as part of the MLS Archive collection. As a celebration of the 40th anniversary of the Vancouver 86ers the Archive jersey uses the colours of the 86ers, and a chest mark and jock tag with 86ers inspired designs.

=== Kit history ===
Home, away, and third kits.

- Home

2011–12	2013–14	2015–16	2017–18	2019–20	2021–22	2023–24	2025–

- Away

2011–13	2014–15	2016–17	2018–19	2020–21	2022–23	2024–25	2026–

- Third

2012–2013	2025	2026

=== Sponsorship ===
Period	Kit manufacturer	Shirt sponsor
2011–2022	Adidas	Bell
2023–present	Adidas	Telus

== Stadium ==
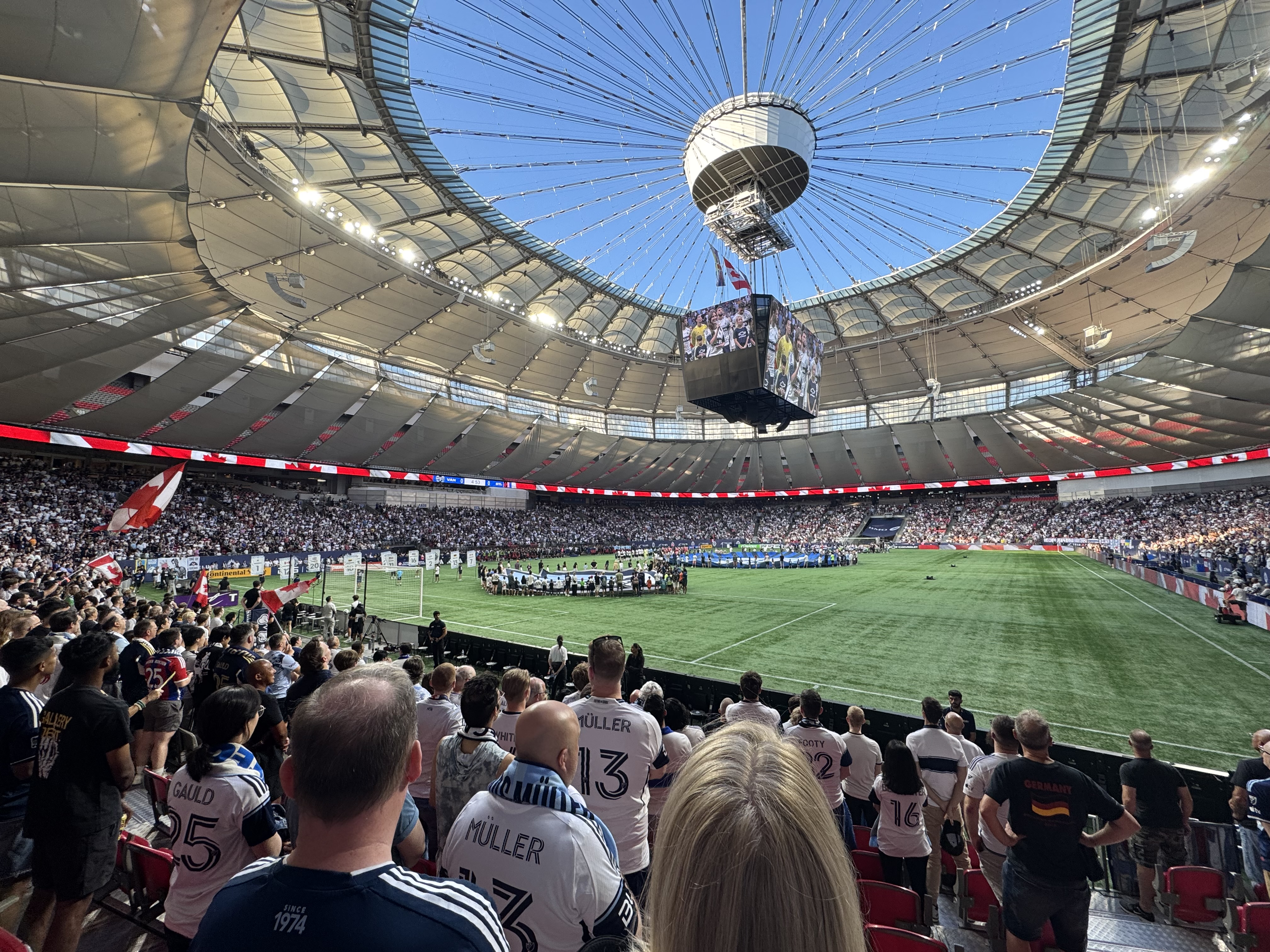
White sheets are used to artificially reduce the capacity of BC Place for most Whitecaps FC matches.

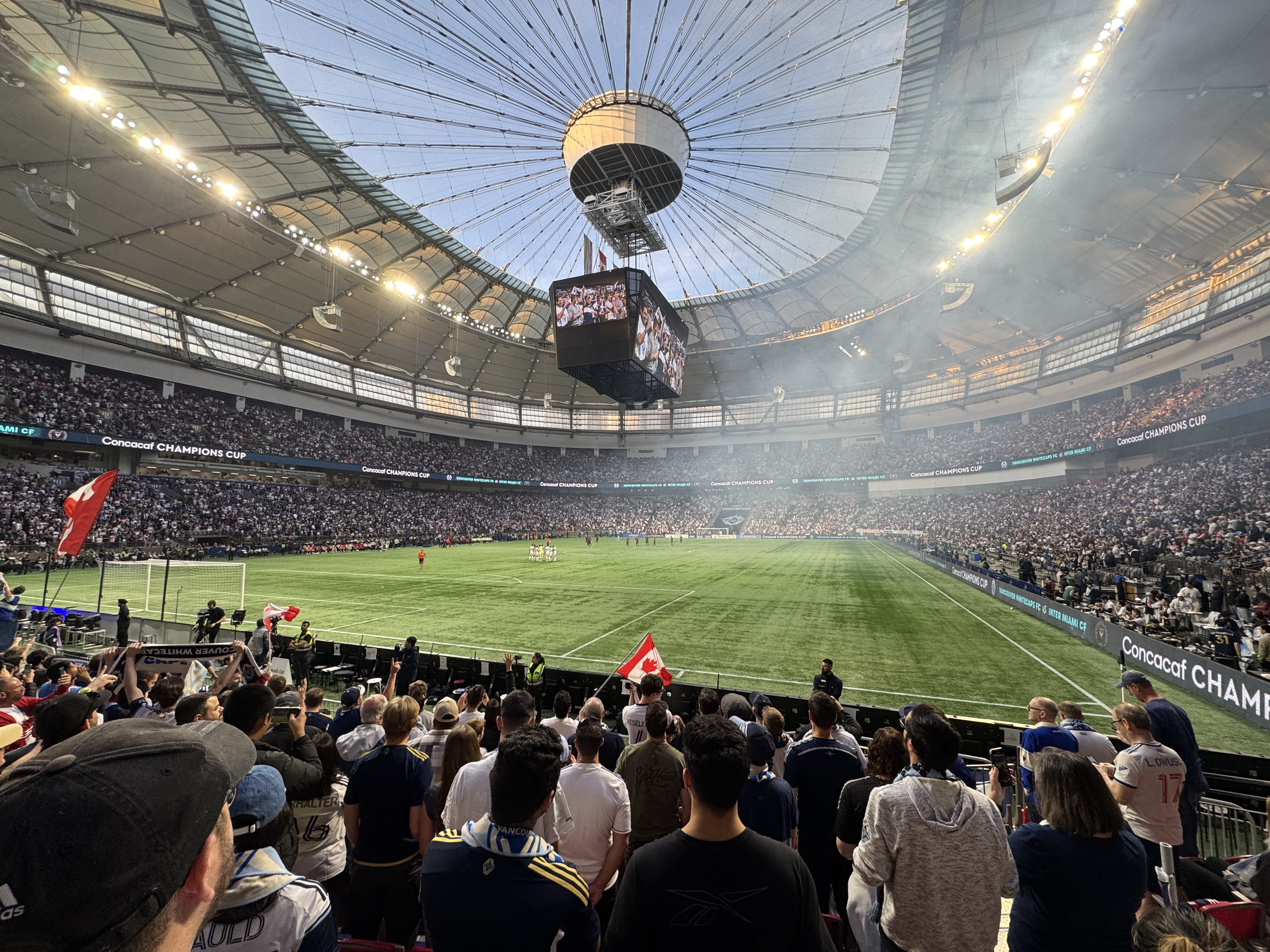
Marquee matches use both the upper and lower bowls.

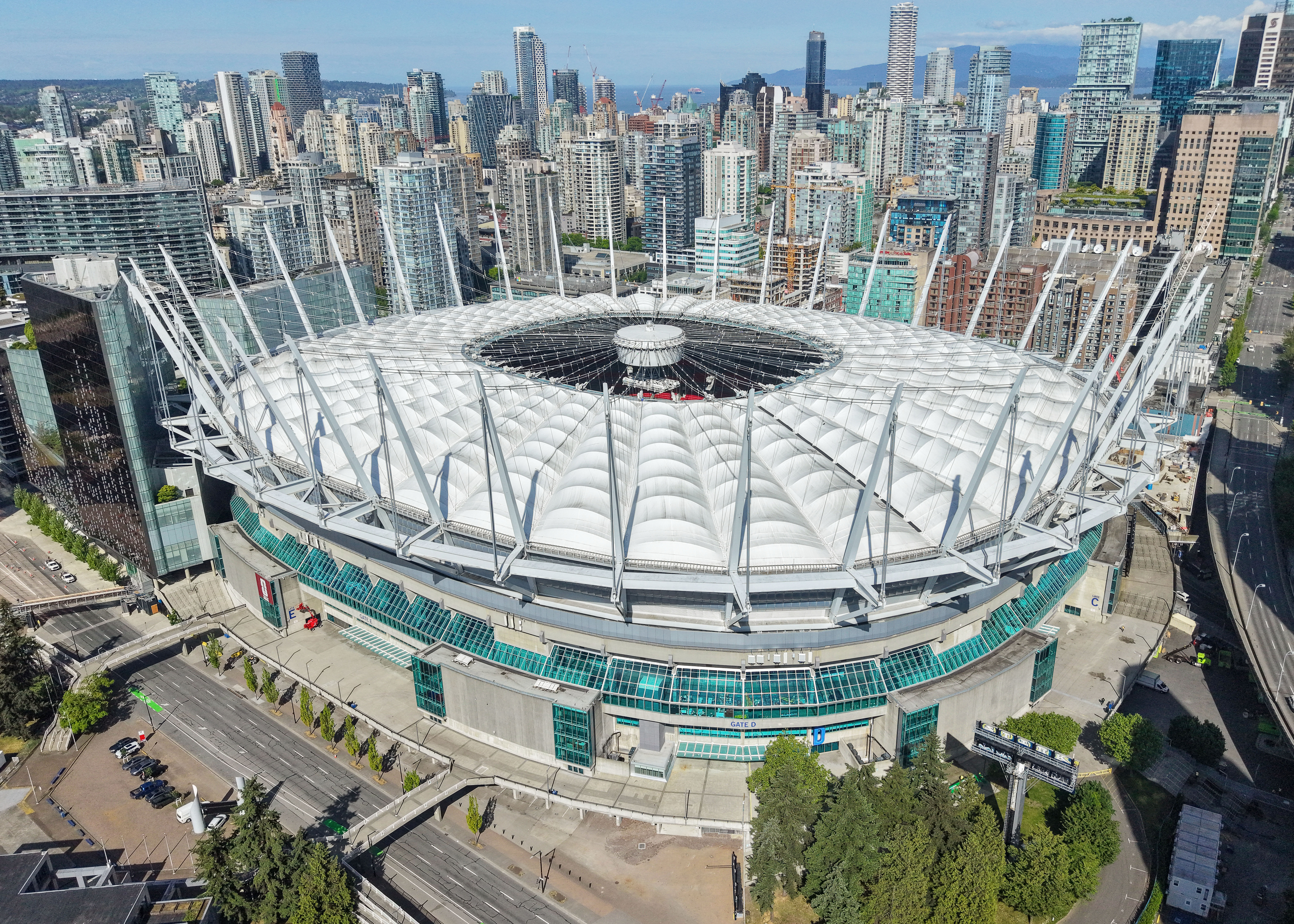
Exterior view of BC Place, May 2026

The Whitecaps plays its home matches since 2011 at BC Place in Vancouver, which it shares with the BC Lions of the Canadian Football League. The 54,500-seat multi-purpose domed stadium opened in 1983 and was designed for both Canadian football and soccer. It underwent a major renovation between 2009 and 2011 to replace the roof with the world's largest cable-supported retractable roof; the renovation also included the installation of white sails (known as the "secondary roof") to close off the upper bowl and reduce capacity to around 22,120 for most Whitecaps matches. BC Place's surface is polytan artificial turf, which is certified by FIFA with a 2-star rating.

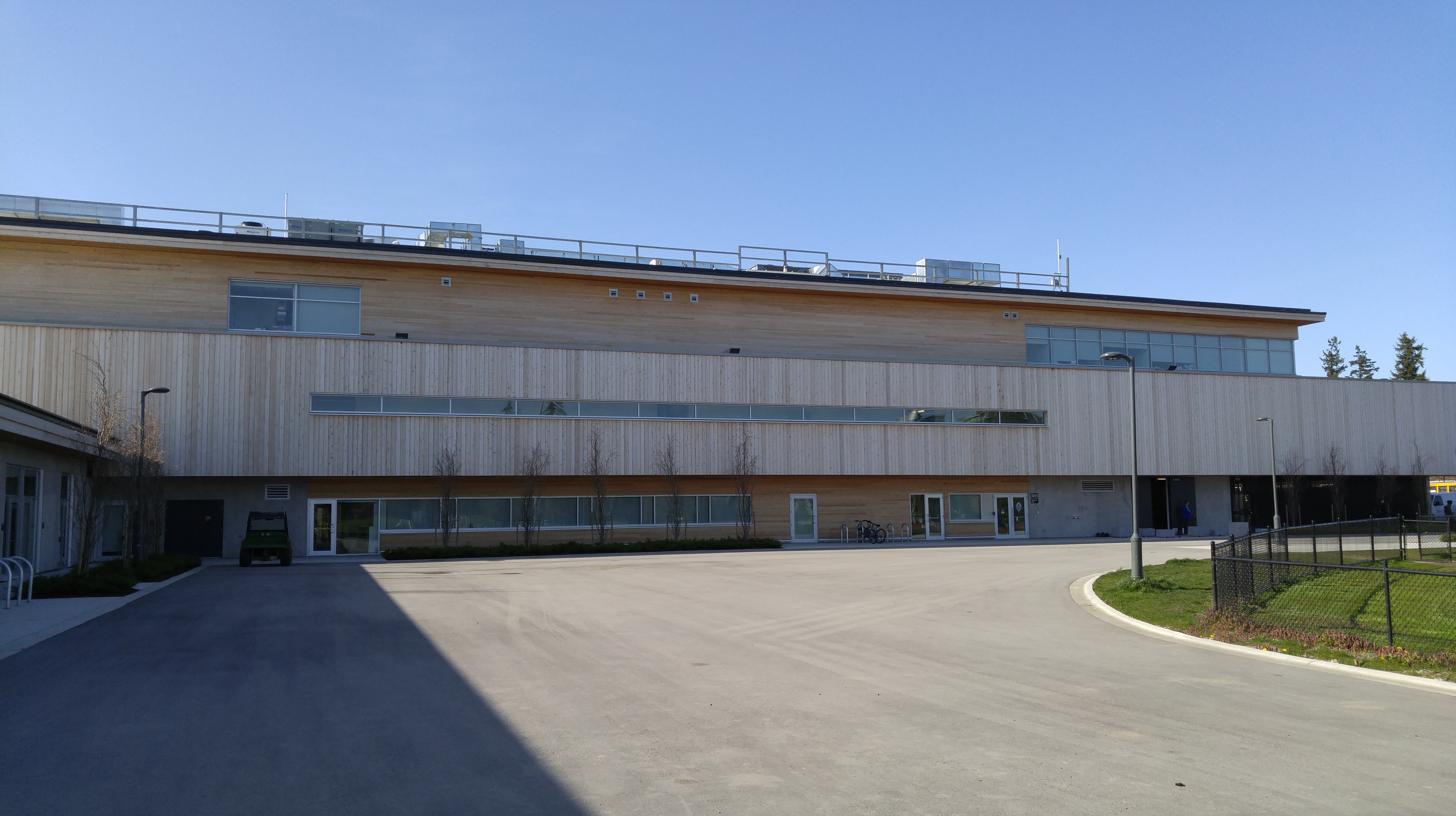
The National Soccer Development Centre on the grounds of the University of British Columbia

The club played most of its inaugural season at Empire Field, a temporary stadium built at the former site of Empire Stadium to house the Whitecaps and the BC Lions while BC Place was being renovated. Empire Field was a 27,500-seat multi-purpose stadium that featured FIFA 1-star rated FieldTurf. The team played its final match at Empire Field on September 24, 2011, a 3–1 loss to Seattle Sounders FC. The following week, the Whitecaps played their first match at BC Place, a 1–0 loss to Portland Timbers on October 2, 2011.

Club ownership initially hoped to build Whitecaps Waterfront Stadium in Gastown in time for the 2016 season. The proposal was abandoned after facing opposition from urbanists and local residents.

Near the end of the 2020 and at the beginning of the 2021 seasons, the club was forced to play their home matches in the United States due to the Canadian government's response to limit cross-border travel during the COVID-19 pandemic. The club shared facilities with the Portland Timbers at Providence Park in Portland, Oregon, where they played one of their rivalry matches as the home team. In 2021, the club played most of their home matches at Rio Tinto Stadium in Sandy, Utah.

In April 2025, it was announced that the Whitecaps and the City of Vancouver were having high level talks about building a new stadium at Hastings Park.

The club initially did not have a permanent training centre, opting instead to use existing facilities around Greater Vancouver. The Whitecaps partnered with the Government of British Columbia and the University of British Columbia (UBC) to build the $32.5 million National Soccer Development Centre on the UBC campus, which opened on September 22, 2017.

== Club culture ==
=== Supporters ===
The largest Whitecaps supporters group is known as the Southsiders. The group began in 1999 when fans of the Vancouver 86ers began congregating in the pitch-level beer garden behind the goal at the south end of Swangard Stadium.

The Southsiders' relationship with the team's ownership has not always been amicable, but improved since the announcement of an MLS expansion team. Images of the Southsiders are featured prominently in Whitecaps' marketing campaigns and the group's board was invited to the invite-only launch of the kits and logo to be used in MLS. The expansion has also increased membership to over 1200 and 100 paid members by July 2010. Southsider supporters were primarily located in the southeast corner (sections 249–254) of BC Place stadium; the majority of the group later relocated to the new general admission section at BC Place in half of section 253 and all of section 254 that was introduced for the 2020 MLS season.

The three biggest supporter groups are the Vancouver Southsiders, Curva Collective and the Rain City Brigade. There are several sub-groups that have emerged, members of which are sometimes also members of the three larger groups. There are generally considered to be 6 separate Whitecaps supporters groups. Founded after the 2011 season, Curva Collective focuses on visual displays and was previously located in the southwest "curve" in sections 203 and 204 at BC Place. Rain City Brigade was established in 2010, occupying part of Section 201 and marching on matchdays from Library Square.

The Whitecaps are also home to North America's first ever all youth supporter group, Vancouver Albion. They stand in section 254, and have become one of the 'Caps biggest groups with over 100 members. The Prawnsiders have existed since the Whitecaps' Swangard years, but organized formally at the beginning of the inaugural MLS season in 2011. The name "Prawnsiders" comes from "prawn-sandwich brigade", a term often used to describe soccer supporters who sit in the more expensive seats. They are primarily located in sections 244 and 245. South Sisters provide a positive meeting space for Vancouver Whitecaps supporters who identify as female, LGBTQ2+, or allies. The group was officially formed in 2019. Couch Ultras, named for their origins as a home-based group, organizes tifo displays at BC Place for the Whitecaps and Canadian national teams.

In 2020, a new general admissions supporters section (named the Village Stand) was introduced in half of Section 253 and all of Section 254, adjacent to the tunnel where the players enter the pitch. Membership in a supporters group is not required and seating is unassigned. The majority of the Vancouver Southsiders and Curva Collective are located here. Standing and chanting are permitted throughout the match in this' section.

=== Mascot ===
The official mascot for the Whitecaps is Spike, a belted kingfisher, a bird common to the Vancouver area. In late spring of 2026, Spike was given a makeover, introducing us to Spike 2.0.

== Rivalries ==
=== Cascadia Cup ===
The Vancouver Whitecaps have longstanding rivalries with both the Portland Timbers and Seattle Sounders FC. The rivalries predate MLS and have been an integral part of the soccer culture in the Pacific Northwest. Matches between these three teams are heated as each of these teams are well-supported by their respective cities.

Portland Timbers

The Portland Timbers are one of the Whitecaps' biggest and longtime rivals, with an antagonistic history between the clubs going back to 1975 in the original North American Soccer League. In the A-League and USL First Division Portland and Vancouver clashed in crucial, and often physical matches during the late 2000s, with the clubs facing each other in memorable playoff duels in 2007, 2009, and 2010. The two clubs played for the 100th time in 2017, and the rivalry is one of the most-played in US soccer history.

Seattle Sounders FC

The rivalry with the Seattle Sounders FC trace back to the 1970s North American Soccer League and have endured through multiple league incarnations, including the USL First Division and MLS since 2011. As of mid-2025, the teams have met over 160 times. Vancouver's most sustained winning run came in the early 1980s, while Seattle's longest unbeaten stretch occurred between 2017 and 2022.

=== Canadian rivalries ===
The Vancouver Whitecaps also have rivalries with Toronto FC and the CF Montreal. Vancouver's first game in MLS was against Toronto in an attempt by the league to spur a rivalry between the two Canadian teams. Montreal was a rival in the second division. The three teams have played each other during Voyageurs Cup competitions.

== Broadcasting ==
All Whitecaps matches are broadcast on television and radio. Through the 2013 season, Sportsnet Pacific and Sportsnet One nationally broadcast all "regional" Whitecaps games not televised by TSN or TSN2 as part of its national package of MLS games, broadcasting 24 games per season. Regional matches were called by Craig MacEwen, who does play-by-play, and former Vancouver 86ers goalkeeper Paul Dolan, who provides colour commentary. Dolan replaced former Vancouver Whitecaps midfielder Martin Nash, who provided colour commentary during the Whitecaps FC inaugural season. In January 2014, TSN (which is owned by Bell Media, a subsidiary of the Whitecaps' founding sponsor Bell Canada) announced that it would take over broadcast rights to these "regional" Whitecaps games beginning in the 2014 Major League Soccer season. In 2014, selected games aired on CIVT-DT and CIVI-DT due to scheduling conflicts. As of 2021, TSN streams all 34 regular season games, with playoff games if qualified. The current broadcasting team features Blake Price doing play-by-play, and Dolan as colour commentator, after Peter Schaad was relieved of his play-by-play duty in April 2021. Since 2023, the only regional broadcast is CKGO-AM, as TSN will only carry selected Whitecaps matches due to the new worldwide MLS broadcast deal with Apple TV.

On radio, Whitecaps games are primarily broadcast on CKNW.com with Asa Rehman and Colin Miller. Until the end of the 2016 season, matches broadcast on radio had play-by-play duties shared between Schaad and Scott Rintoul, and by former Vancouver Whitecaps midfielder David Norman, who provides colour commentary. Norman replaced Paul Dolan prior to the 2012 MLS season, after Dolan joined the Sportsnet broadcasting team.

== Ownership ==
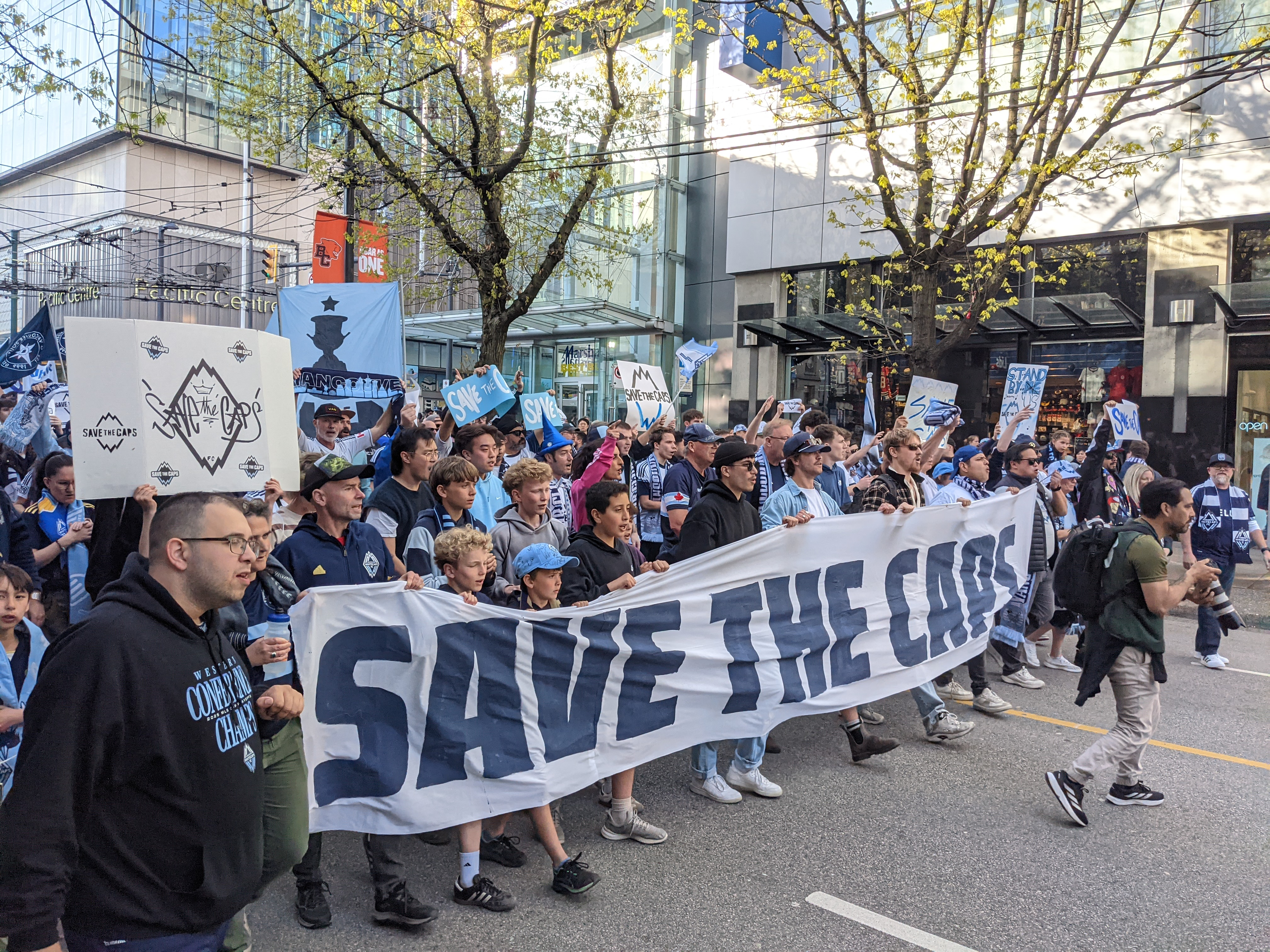
Supporters marching on Robson Street in April 2026 for "Save The Caps" as the teams future in Vancouver is uncertain.

The club is owned by a group of four investors: Greg Kerfoot, Steve Luczo, Jeff Mallett, and Steve Nash. The group has a collective net worth over $2 billion. Kerfoot has been the majority owner of the Whitecaps since 2002, when he saved the club from contraction after previous owner David Stadnyk left the club, selling it to United Soccer Leagues. Mallett, a former chief operating officer (COO) of Yahoo!, was raised in Victoria, British Columbia, and played for several collegiate soccer teams. He later purchased minority stakes in the San Francisco Giants of Major League Baseball and English soccer club Derby County F.C. Having first met at a charity soccer event in 2005, Mallett partnered with Steve Nash—a two-time National Basketball Association (NBA) Most Valuable Player who was also raised in Victoria—to put together a bid for a minority share of English soccer club Tottenham Hotspur F.C. in 2008. After that transaction fell through, the duo contacted Kerfoot about a minority stake in the club. Nash is the older brother of former Whitecaps midfielder Martin Nash. The fourth partner, Steve Luczo, is the president, chairman, and CEO of Seagate Technology and a partner in Boston Basketball Partners L.L.C., a group which owns the NBA's Boston Celtics. Luczo met Kerfoot while the two were both employed by Seagate Technology, and Kerfoot contacted Luczo proposing he become part of the club's MLS bid. In 2009, the group paid a $35 million expansion fee to MLS for the right to join the league. As of 2023, the club is valued at $410 million by Forbes.

In April 2026, a formal offer to buy the team and move it to Las Vegas was received from Grant Gustavson and a group of investors. Gustavson is the son of Public Storage heir and billionaire Tamara Gustavson.

== Current players and staff ==
For details on former players, see All-time Vancouver Whitecaps FC roster.

=== Roster ===
As of September 26, 2026

Note: Flags indicate national team as defined under FIFA eligibility rules; some limited exceptions apply. Players may hold more than one non-FIFA nationality.

No.	Pos.	Nation	Player
1	GK	JPN	Yohei Takaoka
2	DF	URU	Mathías Laborda
3	DF	CAN	Sam Adekugbe
4	DF	SRB	Ranko Veselinović (vice-captain)
6	DF	CAN	Ralph Priso
7	FW	SEN	Cheikh Sabaly
8	MF	USA	Oliver Larraz
11	FW	USA	Emmanuel Sabbi
12	DF	SYR	Belal Halbouni
13	FW	GER	Thomas Müller (DP)
14	FW	ECU	Bruno Caicedo (U22)
15	DF	COL	Sebastián Ramírez (on loan from Fortaleza CEIF)
17	MF	PER	Kenji Cabrera (U22)
18	DF	COL	Édier Ocampo (U22)
19	FW	TUN	Rayan Elloumi (HG)

No.	Pos.	Nation	Player
20	MF	PAR	Andrés Cubas
22	FW	CAN	Kwasi Poku
23	MF	SRB	Aleksa Cvetković
24	FW	USA	Brian White
25	MF	SCO	Ryan Gauld (captain; DP)
28	DF	USA	Tate Johnson (GA)
29	DF	MDA	Mihail Gherasimencov (HG)
30	GK	USA	Adrian Zendejas
32	GK	CAN	Isaac Boehmer (HG)
33	DF	USA	Tristan Blackmon
41	DF	USA	Nikola Djordjevic
59	MF	CAN	Jeevan Badwal (HG)
63	FW	CAN	Johnny Selemani (HG)
70	DF	ANG	Rui Modesto
77	FW	GUI	Yadaly Diaby

=== Out on loan ===
Note: Flags indicate national team as defined under FIFA eligibility rules; some limited exceptions apply. Players may hold more than one non-FIFA nationality.

No.	Pos.	Nation	Player
27	DF	AUS	Giuseppe Bovalina (at Örebro SK through 2026)
42	FW	HAI	Nelson Pierre (at Halifax Wanderers through 2026)
97	MF	CAN	Liam Mackenzie (HG; at Halifax Wanderers through 2026)
—	MF	CAN	Emrick Fotsing (at Vancouver FC through 2026)

=== Technical staff ===
As of July 10, 2025

Role	Name	Nation
Head coach	Jesper Sørensen	Denmark
Assistant coach	Brendan Shaw	Ireland
Assistant coach	Michael D'Agostino	Canada
Goalkeeper coach	Youssef Dahha	Morocco
First team video analyst	Drew Foster	Canada
First team assistant video analyst	James Grieve	Scotland

=== Executive leadership ===
Role	Name	Nation
Chief Executive officer & sporting director	Axel Schuster	Germany
Chief Administrative officer	Manav Deol	Canada
Chief Commercial officer	Aditi Bhatt	United States
Chief Financial officer	Lisa Abbate	Canada

== Former players and staff ==
=== Head coaches ===
Years	Name	Nation
September 1, 2010 – May 30, 2011	Teitur Thordarson	Iceland
May 30, 2011 – October 25, 2011	Tom Soehn (interim)	United States
October 26, 2011 – October 29, 2013	Martin Rennie	Scotland
December 16, 2013 – September 25, 2018	Carl Robinson	Wales
September 25, 2018 – November 7, 2018	Craig Dalrymple (interim)	England
November 7, 2018 – August 27, 2021	Marc Dos Santos	Canada
August 27, 2021 – November 30, 2021	Vanni Sartini (interim)	Italy
November 30, 2021 – November 26, 2024	Vanni Sartini	Italy
January 14, 2025 –	Jesper Sørensen	Denmark

=== Club captains ===
Years	Name	Nation
2011–2014	Jay DeMerit	United States
2014–2016	Pedro Morales	Chile
2016–2017	David Ousted	Denmark
2017–2018	Kendall Waston	Costa Rica
2019	Jon Erice	Spain
2020–2023	Russell Teibert	Canada
2024–present	Ryan Gauld	Scotland

== Affiliated teams ==
=== Whitecaps FC 2 ===
Whitecaps FC 2 is the club's reserve team that began playing in the newly established MLS Next Pro league in 2022.

The team previously played in the United Soccer League from 2015 to 2017 until the team was temporarily disbanded in favour of a partnership with 2018 USL expansion club Fresno FC.

=== Vancouver Rise FC ===
Vancouver Rise FC is a women's club that competes in the Northern Super League, the top flight of the Canadian women's soccer league system. The Rise were one of the first two clubs to join the Northern Super League, and are a spiritual successor to the Whitecaps' former women's team. The club was co-developed with the league itself, in an effort to retain female players from the Whitecaps' academy team, and provide equity between the organization's men's and women's programs.

=== Whitecaps FC Academy ===
Whitecaps FC Academy, formerly known as the Whitecaps Residency program, is the youth academy and development system of Vancouver Whitecaps FC that was established in 2007. The academy fields men's and women's teams in League1 British Columbia, which commenced in 2022.

=== Defunct teams ===
Vancouver Whitecaps FC (women)

The Whitecaps organization owned and operated a women's team in the USL W-League from 2001 to 2012 that played at Swangard Stadium. Originally named the Vancouver Breakers, the club was renamed the Whitecaps in 2003 under the ownership of Greg Kerfoot. The team won the W-League championship twice (in 2004 and 2006) and finished as runners-up in 2010. In its place, the Whitecaps launched an EXCEL youth development program for girls in partnership with B.C. Soccer and Canada Soccer.

In 2019, several former Whitecaps Women players published allegations of sexual abuse and misconduct from coaches at the club. The claims centered around behaviour by head coach Bob Birarda, who was fired in 2008 after an internal investigation, and Hubert Busby Jr., who coached the team from 2011 to 2012. Several supporters groups for the men's team organized protests and walk-outs during matches in April and May 2019 in support of an independent investigation into the allegations. At one protest in May, they were joined by visiting Portland Timbers fans.

In late 2021, MLS announced an independent investigation and review into the conduct of both coaches as well as the Whitecaps organization. The investigation found that the Whitecaps' response "was appropriate" and "adhered to all of the [internal] investigator's recommendations". A parallel investigation into Canada Soccer's actions found that the allegations of Birarda's behaviour with the under-20 team were "mishandled" by CSA.

Fresno FC

In November 2017, Vancouver Whitecaps FC entered into an official USL affiliation agreement with Fresno FC, a newly established USL expansion team set to begin play in the 2018 season.

The partnership between Vancouver Whitecaps FC and Fresno FC effectively ended when Fresno FC ceased operations on October 29, 2019.

== Honours ==
Domestic
Competition	Titles	Seasons	Runners-up
MLS Cup	0	–	2025
Supporters' Shield	0	–	2026
Western Conference (Playoff)	1	2025	–
Western Conference (Regular Season)	1	2026	2015, 2025
Canadian Championship	5	2015, 2022, 2023, 2024, 2025	2011, 2012, 2016, 2018
Continental
CONCACAF Champions Cup	0	–	2025

== Awards ==
=== Team ===
- Cascadia Cup: 2013, 2014, 2016, 2023, 2025, 2026

=== Players ===
==== Golden Boot ====
Top scorer by season
Year	Player	Goals
2011	(Brazil) Camilo	12
2012	(Jamaica) Darren Mattocks	7
2013	(Brazil) Camilo	22
2014	(Chile) Pedro Morales	10
2015	(Uruguay) Octavio Rivero	10
2016	(Chile) Pedro Morales	9
2017	(Colombia) Fredy Montero	13
2018	(Sierra Leone) Kei Kamara	14
2019	(Colombia) Fredy Montero	8
2020	(Canada) Lucas Cavallini	6
2021	(United States) Brian White	12
2022	(Canada) Lucas Cavallini	9
2023	(United States) Brian White	15
2024	(United States) Brian White	15
2025	(United States) Brian White	16
2026	(United States) Brian White	20

Note: Only MLS regular season goals counted

==== Player of the Year ====
Year	Player	Nation
2011	Camilo	Brazil
2012	Lee Young-Pyo	South Korea
2013	Camilo	Brazil
2014	Pedro Morales	Chile
2015	Kendall Waston	Costa Rica
2016	Jordan Harvey	United States
2017	Kendall Waston	Costa Rica
2018	Alphonso Davies	Canada
2019	Maxime Crépeau	Canada
2020	Ali Adnan	Iraq
2021	Maxime Crépeau	Canada
2022	Ryan Gauld	Scotland
2023	Ryan Gauld	Scotland
2024	Ryan Gauld	Scotland
2025	Sebastian Berhalter	United States
2026	Andrés Cubas	Paraguay

==== Additional Awards ====
Honour	Player	Year
MLS Best XI	Kendall Waston	2015, 2017
MLS Best XI	Tristan Blackmon	2025
MLS Best XI	Sebastian Berhalter	2025
MLS Defender of the Year Award	Tristan Blackmon	2025
George Cross Memorial Trophy	Russell Teibert	2015
George Cross Memorial Trophy	Ryan Gauld	2022
George Cross Memorial Trophy	Julian Gressel	2023
George Cross Memorial Trophy	Isaac Boehmer	2024
George Cross Memorial Trophy	Ali Ahmed	2025
Best Young Canadian Player Award	Ryan Raposo	2022
Best Young Canadian Player Award	Ali Ahmed	2023
Best Young Canadian Player Award	Isaac Boehmer	2024
Best Young Canadian Player Award	Jayden Nelson	2025
Best Young Canadian Player Award	Jeevan Badwal	2026

=== Staff ===
Award	Recipient	Year
MLS Sporting Executive of the Year	Axel Schuster	2025

== Team records ==
=== Year-by-year ===
This is a partial list of the last five seasons completed by the Whitecaps. For the full season-by-season history, see List of Vancouver Whitecaps FC seasons. For a historical list encompassing results from the previous two incarnations of the club, see History of Vancouver Whitecaps FC.

Last five seasons
Season	League											Position		Playoffs	CC	Continental		Other	Average attendance	Top goalscorer(s)	
Season	Div	League	Pld	W	L	D	GF	GA	GD	Pts	PPG	Conf.	Overall	Playoffs	CC	CCL	LC	Other	Average attendance	Name(s)	Goals
2021	1	MLS	34	12	9	13	45	45	0	49	1.44	6th	12th	R1	R1	DNQ	DNQ	DNE/DNQ	12,492 (Note: Does not include home matches played in American stadiums.)	(Colombia) Cristian Dájome (United States) Brian White	12
2022	1	MLS	34	12	15	7	40	57	–17	43	1.26	9th	17th	DNQ	W	DNQ	DNE	DNE/DNQ	18,643	(Canada) Lucas Cavallini	9
2023	1	MLS	34	12	10	12	55	48	+7	48	1.41	6th	13th	R1	W	QF	Ro32	DNE/DNQ	16,745	(United States) Brian White	19
2024	1	MLS	34	13	13	8	52	49	+3	47	1.38	8th	14th	R1	W	R1	Ro32	DNE/DNQ	26,121	(United States) Brian White	15
2025	1	MLS	34	18	7	9	66	38	+28	63	1.85	2nd	5th	RU	W	RU	DNP (Note: VWFC qualified, but did not participate in the 2025 Leagues Cup due to an MLS rule limiting clubs to participating in a maximum of two 2025 cup competitions; VWFC participated in the Canadian Championship and CONCACAF Champions Cup.)	DNE/DNQ	21,806	(United States) Brian White	16

1. Avg. attendance include statistics from league matches only.
2. Top goalscorer(s) includes all goals scored in League, MLS Cup Playoffs, Canadian Championship, MLS is Back Tournament, CONCACAF Champions League, FIFA Club World Cup, and other competitive continental matches.

=== International tournaments ===
Vancouver has qualified for the CONCACAF Champions Cup five times, the first in the 2015–16 edition of the tournament.

The following is a list of results for Vancouver Whitecaps FC in international competitions. Vancouver Whitecaps FC's scores are listed first.

Year	Tournament	Round	Opponent	Home	Away	Agg.
2011	World Football Challenge	Group Stage	(England) Manchester City	1–2		
2015–16	CONCACAF Champions League	Group Stage	(United States) Seattle Sounders FC	1–1		
2015–16	CONCACAF Champions League	Group Stage	(Honduras) Olimpia	1–0		
2015–16	CONCACAF Champions League	Group Stage	(United States) Seattle Sounders FC		0–3	
2015–16	CONCACAF Champions League	Group Stage	(Honduras) Olimpia		0–1	
2016–17	CONCACAF Champions League	Group Stage	(Trinidad and Tobago) Central		1–0	
2016–17	CONCACAF Champions League	Group Stage	(United States) Sporting Kansas City	3–0		
2016–17	CONCACAF Champions League	Group Stage	(United States) Sporting Kansas City		2–1	
2016–17	CONCACAF Champions League	Group Stage	(Trinidad and Tobago) Central	4–1		
2016–17	CONCACAF Champions League	Quarter-finals	(United States) New York Red Bulls	2–0	1–1	3–1
2016–17	CONCACAF Champions League	Semi-finals	(Mexico) Tigres UANL	1–2	0–2	1–4
2023	CONCACAF Champions League	Round of 16	(Honduras) Real España	5–0	2–3	7–3
2023	CONCACAF Champions League	Quarter-finals	(United States) Los Angeles FC	0–3	0–3	0–6
2023	Leagues Cup	Group Stage	(Mexico) León	2–2		
2023	Leagues Cup	Group Stage	(United States) LA Galaxy		2–1	
2023	Leagues Cup	Round of 32	(Mexico) Tigres UANL	1–1		
2024	CONCACAF Champions Cup	Round One	(Mexico) Tigres UANL	1–1	0–3	1–4
2024	Leagues Cup	Group Stage	(United States) Los Angeles FC		2–2	
2024	Leagues Cup	Group Stage	(Mexico) Tijuana	3–1		
2024	Leagues Cup	Round of 32	(Mexico) Pumas UNAM	0–2		
2025	CONCACAF Champions Cup	Round One	(Costa Rica) Saprissa	2–0	1–2	3–2
2025	CONCACAF Champions Cup	Round of 16	(Mexico) Monterrey	1–1	2–2	3–3
2025	CONCACAF Champions Cup	Quarter-finals	(Mexico) Pumas UNAM	1–1	2–2	3–3
2025	CONCACAF Champions Cup	Semi-finals	(United States) Inter Miami CF	2–0	3–1	5–1
2025	CONCACAF Champions Cup	Final	(Mexico) Cruz Azul		0–5	
2026	CONCACAF Champions Cup	Round One	(Costa Rica) Cartaginés	2–0	0–0	2–0
2026	CONCACAF Champions Cup	Round of 16	(United States) Seattle Sounders FC	0–3	1–2	1–5
2026	Leagues Cup	League Phase	(Mexico) Atlante	0–1		
2026	Leagues Cup	League Phase	(Mexico) Juárez	1–3		
2026	Leagues Cup	League Phase	(Mexico) Tigres UANL		1–1	
2027	CONCACAF Champions Cup	TBD	TBD			

CONCACAF Champions Cup history
First match	Whitecaps FC 1–1 Seattle Sounders FC (United States) (August 5, 2015; Vancouver, Canada)
Biggest win	Whitecaps FC 5–0 Real España (Honduras) (March 8, 2023; Vancouver, Canada)
Biggest defeats	Seattle Sounders FC 3–0 Whitecaps FC (September 23, 2015; Seattle, United States) Whitecaps FC 0–3 Los Angeles FC (April 5, 2023; Vancouver, Canada) Los Angeles FC 3–0 Whitecaps FC (April 11, 2023; Los Angeles, United States) UANL 3–0 Whitecaps FC (February 14, 2024; San Nicolás de los Garza, Mexico)
Best result	Runners-up in 2025
Worst result	Group stage (3rd in group) in 2015–16

=== Record by opponent ===
Team	Pld	W	D	L	GF	GA	GD	WPCT
(Mexico) Atlante	1	0	0	1	0	1	−1	0.00
(Costa Rica) Cartaginés	2	1	1	0	2	0	+2	50.00
(Mexico) Cruz Azul	1	0	0	1	0	5	−5	0.00
(Trinidad and Tobago) Central	2	2	0	0	5	1	+4	100.00
(Mexico) Juárez	1	0	0	1	1	3	−2	0.00
(United States) LA Galaxy	1	1	0	0	2	1	+1	100.00
(Mexico) León	1	0	1	0	2	2	0	0.00
(United States) Los Angeles FC	3	0	1	2	2	8	−6	0.00
(United States) Inter Miami CF	2	2	0	0	5	1	+4	100.00
(England) Manchester City	1	0	0	1	1	2	−1	0.00
(Mexico) Monterrey	2	0	2	0	3	3	0	0.00
(United States) New York Red Bulls	2	1	1	0	3	1	+2	50.00
(Honduras) Olimpia	2	1	0	1	1	1	0	50.00
(Mexico) Pumas UNAM	3	0	2	1	3	5	−2	0.00
(Honduras) Real España	2	1	0	1	7	3	+4	50.00
(Costa Rica) Saprissa	2	1	0	1	3	2	+1	50.00
(United States) Seattle Sounders FC	4	0	1	3	2	9	−7	0.00
(United States) Sporting Kansas City	2	2	0	0	5	1	+4	100.00
(Mexico) Tigres UANL	6	0	3	3	4	10	−6	0.00
(Mexico) Tijuana	1	1	0	0	3	1	+2	100.00
Total	41	13	12	16	54	60	−6	31.71

Source: Results

== Player records ==
=== Appearances ===
Rank	Pos.	Player	Nation	Career	MLS	Playoffs	CC	CCL	LC	MIB	Total
1	Midfielder	Russell Teibert	Canada	2011–23	250	2	32	10	2	4	300
2	Defender	Jordan Harvey	United States	2011–17	179	5	12	4	–	–	200
2	Defender	**Ranko Veselinović**	Serbia	2020–present	158	6	13	14	5	4	200
4	Forward	**Brian White**	United States	2021–present	136	9	14	15	6	–	180
5	Defender	Jake Nerwinski	United States	2017–23	138	4	11	2	–	4	159
6	Midfielder	Gershon Koffie	Ghana	2011–15	134	4	13	1	–	–	152
7	Goalkeeper	David Ousted	Denmark	2013–17	142	3	2	4	–	–	151
8	Midfielder	**Ryan Gauld**	Scotland	2021–present	114	11	12	8	3	–	148
8	Midfielder	**Sebastian Berhalter**	United States	2022–present	106	9	14	14	5	–	148
8	Midfielder	Ryan Raposo	Canada	2020–24	119	3	12	6	5	3	148

As of December 1, 2025

CC = Canadian Championship; CCL = CONCACAF Champions League; MIB = MLS is Back Tournament
Bolded players are currently on the Whitecaps FC roster.

=== Goals ===
Rank	Pos.	Player	Nation	Career	MLS	Playoffs	CC	CCL	LC	Total
1	Forward	**Brian White**	United States	2021–present	62	4	5	7	1	79
2	Midfielder	**Ryan Gauld**	Scotland	2021–present	34	5	6	1	0	46
3	Forward	Camilo	Brazil	2011–13	39	–	4	–	–	43
4	Midfielder	Pedro Morales	Chile	2014–16	25	0	4	0	–	29
4	Midfielder	Cristian Techera	Uruguay	2015–18	23	1	0	5	–	29
6	Forward	Fredy Montero	Colombia	2017, 2019–20	26	1	0	1	–	28
7	Forward	Kekuta Manneh	Gambia	2013–17	22	0	1	1	–	24
8	Forward	Darren Mattocks	Jamaica	2012–15	19	1	2	0	–	22
9	Forward	Yordy Reyna	Peru	2017–20	20	0	1	–	–	21
10	Forward	Lucas Cavallini	Canada	2020–2022	18	0	0	–	–	18

As of September 14, 2024

CC = Canadian Championship; CCL = CONCACAF Champions League; MIB = MLS is Back Tournament
Bolded players are currently on the Whitecaps FC roster.

=== Clean sheets ===
Rank	Player	Nation	Career	MLS	Playoffs	CC	CCL	LC	MIB	Total
1	David Ousted	Denmark	2013–2018	43	1	1	1	–	–	46
2	**Yohei Takaoka**	Japan	2023–present	28	3	1	3	0	–	35
3	Joe Cannon	United States	2010–2014	13	–	0	–	–	–	13
3	Maxime Crépeau	Canada	2018–2022	12	0	1	–	–	0	13
5	Brad Knighton	United States	2012–2013	7	0	3	–	–	–	10
6	Thomas Hasal	Canada	2019–2024	6	–	–	0	–	2	8
7	Cody Cropper	United States	2022–2023	5	–	1	–	–	–	6
7	Stefan Marinovic	New Zealand	2017–2019	3	2	1	–	–	–	6
9	**Isaac Boehmer**	Canada	2021–present	1	–	4	0	0	–	5
10	Paolo Tornaghi	Italy	2014–2017	1	–	1	2	–	–	4

As of December 1, 2025

CC = Canadian Championship; CCL = CONCACAF Champions League; MIB = MLS is Back Tournament
Bolded players are currently on the Whitecaps FC roster.
