= Peter Nover =

German footballer (born 1949)

Personal information
- Date of birth: 18 July 1949 (age 77)
- Place of birth: Holzheim, West Germany
- Height: 1.94 m (6 ft 4 in)
- Position: Defender

Senior career*
Years	Team	Apps	(Gls)
1972–1973	1. FC Saarbrücken	30	(4)
1973–1974	Wuppertaler SV	0	(0)
1974–1976	1. FC Mülheim	26	(1)
1976	Boston Minutemen	18	(2)
1976–1977	Bonner SC	13	(1)
1977	Team Hawaii	26	(7)
1977–1978	Schwarz-Weiß Essen	7	(1)
1978–1980	San Diego Sockers	71	(12)
1980–1981	Atlas	15	(0)
Total		206	(28)
- * Club domestic league appearances and goals

Peter Nover (born 18 July 1949) is a German former professional footballer who played as a defender in the 2. Bundesliga, North American Soccer League and Mexican Primera División.

== Career ==
Born in Holzheim, Rhineland-Palatinate, Nover began playing football with amateurs Itzehoer SV 1909. He turned professional with Regionalliga Südwest side 1. FC Saarbrücken before joining Bundesliga side Wuppertaler SV Borussia in 1973. He only made one DFB-Pokal appearance for Wuppertaler before leaving for second division side 1. FC Mülheim in 1974.

In 1976, Nover moved to the United States to play in the NASL. He played for the Boston Minutemen and Team Hawaii, returning to Germany after each season for stints with Bonner SC and Schwarz-Weiß Essen, before settling with the San Diego Sockers in 1978. The physically imposing defender was known for both his defensive and offensive abilities.

Nover finished his playing career with Club Atlas during the 1980–81 season.
