= Bob Lenarduzzi =

Canadian soccer player (born 1955)

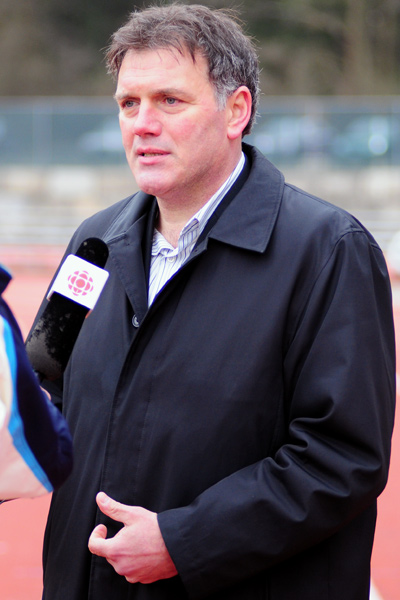

Personal information
- Full name: Robert Italo Lenarduzzi
- Date of birth: May 1, 1955 (age 71)
- Place of birth: Vancouver, British Columbia, Canada
- Height: 1.83 m (6 ft 0 in)
- Position: Defender

Senior career*
| Years | Team | Apps | (Gls) |
| 1970–1976 | Surrey kidhaa | 67 | (2) |
| 1970, 1971 | → Vancouver Spartans | | |
| 1970–1971 | → Vancouver Columbus FC | | |
| 1974–1984 | Vancouver Whitecaps | 288 | (31) |
| 1979–1980 | → Los Angeles Aztecs (indoor) | 12 | (2) |
| 1980–1984 | Vancouver Whitecaps (indoor) | 58 | (22) |
| 1984–1986 | Tacoma Stars | 96 | (16) |
| 1987–1988 | Vancouver 86ers | | |

International career
| 1973–1986 | Canada | 48 | (5) |

Managerial career
- 1987–1993: Vancouver 86ers
- 1993–1998: Canada
Medal record
Representing Canada
Men's Association football
CONCACAF Championship
| Winner | 1985 North America |
- * Club domestic league appearances and goals

Robert Italo Lenarduzzi, OBC (born May 1, 1955) is a former North American Soccer League player, Canadian international, and coach of the Canadian national and Olympic soccer teams. He is currently club liaison for Vancouver Whitecaps FC. He is a member of the National Soccer Hall of Fame.

== Club career ==
Lenarduzzi began his professional playing career as a midfielder and defender at age 15 with Reading in the English Football League and went on to play 67 first-team games and score two goals with the club. Lenarduzzi then also joined the NASL Vancouver Whitecaps in 1974 in the team's first season. Until 1976, he divided his time between Vancouver in the summer and Reading in the winter. He played 11 seasons for Vancouver until the Whitecaps' last season in 1984, when the league folded. Lenarduzzi holds the record for most games played in the league, with 312. Lenarduzzi played all eleven positions during his tenure with the team, including 45 minutes as goalkeeper. He was also voted NASL North American player of the year in 1978. The Whitecaps won the NASL Soccer Bowl championship in 1979. In 1984, Lenarduzzi joined the Tacoma Stars of Major Indoor Soccer League (MISL). He spent two seasons with them before in 1986 becoming executive director of the Vancouver 86ers of the Canadian Soccer League. In 1987, he returned to the field as a player and a coach with the 86ers.

=== Indoor career ===
Lenarduzzi and two Vancouver teammates spent the 1979–80 NASL Indoor season on loan to the Los Angeles Aztecs, as the Whitecaps themselves did not field an indoor team for that year. Vancouver did participate in three subsequent indoor seasons, and Lenarduzzi featured in all three for the Whitecaps.

== National team playing career ==
Lenarduzzi earned 48 caps playing for Canada. He played all the country's matches both as the squad progressed to the quarterfinals of the 1984 Summer Olympics and as it participated in the first round of the 1986 World Cup finals.

=== International goals ===
Scores and results list Canada's goal tally first.

| # | Date | Venue | Opponent | Score | Result | Competition |
|---|---|---|---|---|---|---|
| 1 | 22 December 1976 | Stade Sylvio Cator, Port-au-Prince, Haiti | United States | 2–0 | 3–0 | 1978 FIFA World Cup qualification |
| 2 | 16 October 1977 | Estadio Azteca, Mexico City, Mexico | Guatemala | 2–0 | 2–1 | 1978 FIFA World Cup qualification |
| 3 | 15 September 1980 | Empire Stadium, Vancouver, Canada | New Zealand | 1–0 | 4–0 | Friendly match |
| 4 | 17 September 1980 | Commonwealth Stadium, Edmonton, Canada | New Zealand | 1–0 | 3–0 | Friendly match |
| 5 | 14 October 1981 | Stade Pierre-Antonius, Pointe-à-Pitre, Guadeloupe | Guadeloupe | 1–0 | 2–1 | Friendly match |

== Coaching career ==
Lenarduzzi resumed his pro career in 1987 as a player–coach with the newly formed Vancouver 86ers of the newly founded Canadian Soccer League. After retiring permanently from playing in September 1988, he continued to coach the 86ers for the next five seasons. He led the franchise to four consecutive CSL titles from 1988 to 1991. His team set a record for professional North American sports teams by going 46 games unbeaten between June 6, 1988, and August 8, 1989.

=== Canada national team ===
Lenarduzzi was the head coach for the Canadian men's national team briefly in 1989 and for a longer term that started in 1992. In his first of two bids to see Canada back through to a World Cup finals, his squad twice came close but failed to progress to the 1994 finals. First they lost at home to Mexico despite scoring the game's first goal in a game with which Canada could have gone through to the finals with a win. (See 1994 FIFA World Cup qualification (CONCACAF).) As CONCACAF qualifying winners-up, Canada then lost the away leg to Australia in a match decided by penalty kicks that saw the winner of the home-and-away series go on to play Argentina in a home-and-away series for a finals spot (won by Argentina).

In qualifying for the 1998 finals, Canada failed to finish in the top three of a six-nation CONCACAF final qualifying round league tournament and progress. (See 1998 FIFA World Cup qualification (CONCACAF).) Lenarduzzi subsequently resigned his post in 1997.

== Administrative career ==
Lenarduzzi served as 86ers general manager from 1988 to 1993. He resumed the post in 1998 and was named the A-League's executive of the year for 2000. In 2001, he also assumed the position of the Whitecaps Head of Soccer Operations. (The 86ers changed their name to Whitecaps in 2001.)

During the 2008 MLS season, Lenarduzzi served as colour commentator during CBC Television's Toronto FC broadcasts before Jason DeVos arrived to fill the position on a more permanent basis.

Lenarduzzi was the president of Vancouver Whitecaps FC from the time it entered Major League Soccer until August 15, 2019, when the role was eliminated in favour of the role of sporting director. He then became club liaison.

== Recognition ==
In 2001, Lenarduzzi was inducted as a player into the Canadian Soccer Hall of Fame. In 2005, he was awarded the Order of British Columbia. In 2003, he was inducted into the U.S. National Soccer Hall of Fame. Lenarduzzi was voted one of the Top 30 Players of the Century in the Confederation of North, Central America and Caribbean Association Football (CONCACAF) region.

== Honours ==
Canada

- CONCACAF Championship: 1985
