= John Craven (footballer) =

English footballer

Personal information
- Full name: John Roland Craven
- Date of birth: 15 May 1947
- Place of birth: Lytham St Annes, England
- Date of death: 14 December 1996 (aged 49)
- Place of death: Orange, California, US
- Height: 5 ft 11 in (1.80 m)
- Position: Midfielder

Senior career*
Years	Team	Apps	(Gls)
1965–1971	Blackpool	163	(24)
1971–1973	Crystal Palace	63	(14)
1973–1977	Coventry City	89	(8)
1976–1978	Plymouth Argyle	45	(3)
1978–1980	Vancouver Whitecaps	70	(10)
1981	California Surf	19	(0)
Total		360	(49)
- * Club domestic league appearances and goals

John Roland Craven (15 May 1947 – 14 December 1996) was an English professional footballer. He began his playing career as a defender, but also played as a centre-forward on occasion. He also played in the United States and captained the Vancouver Whitecaps, including in their Soccer Bowl '79 winning year. The side were inducted into the Canadian Soccer Hall of Fame and Museum as a Team of Distinction in 2011.

== Death ==
Craven died of a heart attack while in Orange, California, in December 1996.
