= Phil Parkes (footballer, born 1947) =

English footballer (1947–2026)

Personal information
- Date of birth: 14 July 1947
- Place of birth: West Bromwich, England
- Date of death: 8 August 2026 (aged 79)
- Position: Goalkeeper

Youth career
- 1962–1964: Wolverhampton Wanderers

Senior career*
Years	Team	Apps	(Gls)
1964–1978	Wolverhampton Wanderers	303	(0)
1967	→ Los Angeles Wolves (guest)	7	(0)
1969	→ Kansas City Spurs (guest)	8	(0)
1976–1979	Vancouver Whitecaps	78	(0)
1980–1981	Chicago Sting	40	(0)
1980–1981	Chicago Sting (indoor)	10	(0)
1981	San Jose Earthquakes	1	(0)
1982–1983	Oklahoma City Slickers	28+	(0)
1983	Toronto Blizzard	1	(0)
- * Club domestic league appearances and goals

Philip Parkes (14 July 1947 – 8 August 2026) was an English professional footballer who played as a goalkeeper. He began his career with Wolverhampton Wanderers and later played in North America.

== Career ==
Parkes missed out on a winners' medal in the League Cup when he broke an ankle in the run-up to the 1974 final.

== Personal life and death ==
After retiring from his football career, Parkes returned to England and settled in Wolverhampton. Parkes, who suffered a serious fall in 2025 and lived under medical supervision, died on 8 August 2026, at the age of 79.
