= 1970 FIFA World Cup qualification =

1970 FIFA World Cup Qualification
Tournament details
- Dates: 19 May 1968 - 14 December 1969
- Teams: 75 (from 6 confederations)

Tournament statistics
- Matches played: 172
- Goals scored: 542 (3.15 per match)
- Top scorer: (Brazil) Tostão (10 goals)

A total of 75 teams entered the 1970 FIFA World Cup qualification rounds, competing for a total of 16 spots in the final tournament. Hosts Mexico and defending champions England qualified automatically, leaving 14 spots open for competition.

For the first time, the winners of both the African zone and the Asian and Oceanian zone were guaranteed a direct place in the final tournament. The 16 spots available in the 1970 World Cup would be distributed among the continental zones as follows:

- Europe (UEFA): 9 places, 1 of them went to automatic qualifier England, while the other 8 places were contested by 29 teams.
- South America (CONMEBOL): 3 places, contested by 10 teams.
- North, Central America and Caribbean (CONCACAF): 2 places, 1 of them went to automatic qualifier Mexico, while the other 1 place was contested by 13 teams.
- Africa (CAF): 1 place, contested by 13 teams. (13 teams applied, but FIFA rejected the entries of Guinea and Zaire, leaving 11 teams. A 14th team from Africa, Rhodesia, entered through a non-CAF qualifying system.)
- Asia and Oceania (AFC/OFC): 1 place, contested by 7 teams (including Rhodesia).

A total of 68 teams played in at least one qualifying match. A total of 172 qualifying matches were played, and 542 goals were scored (an average of 3.15 per match).

Listed below are the dates and results of the qualification rounds.

Key:

- Teams highlighted in green qualified for the finals.
- Teams highlighted in red in the same table finished level on points and advanced to a play-off on neutral ground.

== Qualified teams ==
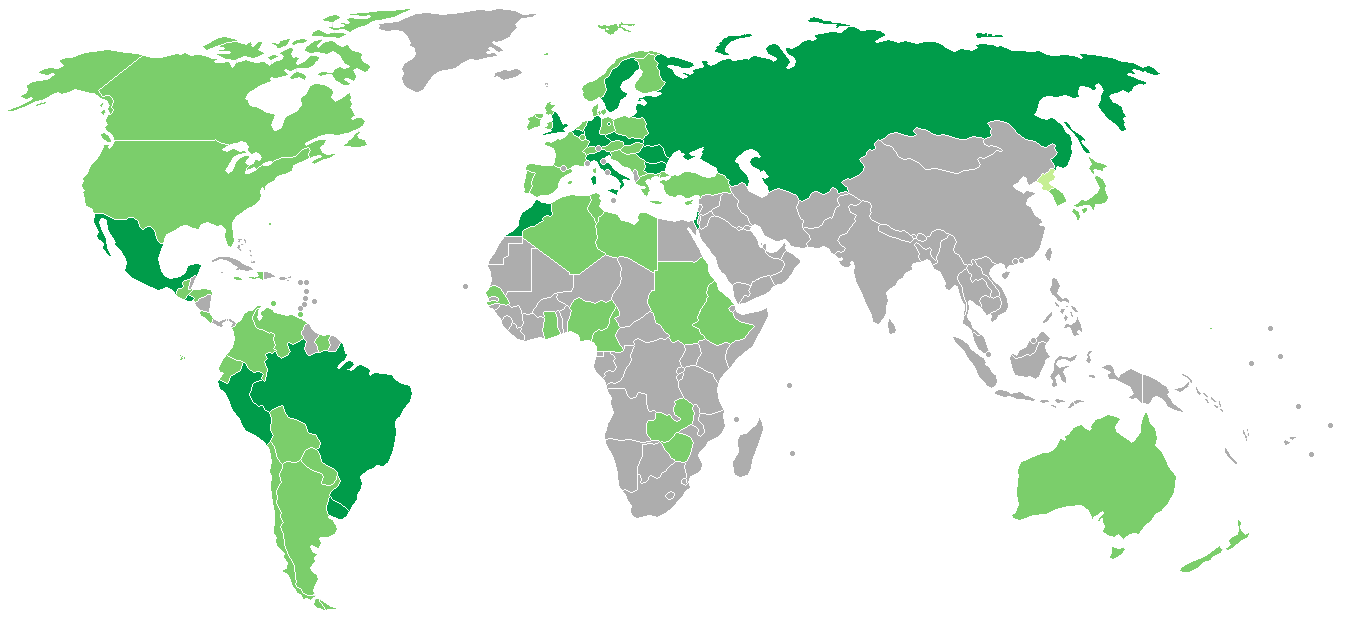
FIFA World Cup qualification 1970

Team	Method of qualification	Date of qualification	Finals appearance	Streak	Previous best performance
Mexico	Hosts	8 October 1964	7th	6	Group stage (1930, 1950, 1954, 1958, 1962, 1966)
England	Defending Champions	30 July 1966	6th	6	Winners (1966)
Belgium	UEFA Group 6 Winners	30 April 1969	5th	1 (Last: 1954)	Group stage (1930, 1934, 1938, 1954)
Uruguay	CONMEBOL Group 3 Winners	10 August 1969	6th	3	Winners (1930, 1950)
Brazil	CONMEBOL Group 2 Winners	24 August 1969	9th	9	Winners (1958, 1962)
Peru	CONMEBOL Group 1 Winners	31 August 1969	2nd	1 (Last: 1930)	Group stage (1930)
El Salvador	CONCACAF Winners	8 October 1969	1st	1	—
Sweden	UEFA Group 5 Winners	15 October 1969	5th	1 (Last: 1958)	Runners-up (1958)
West Germany	UEFA Group 7 Winners	22 October 1969	7th	5	Winners (1954)
Morocco	CAF Winners	26 October 1969	1st	1	—
Soviet Union	UEFA Group 4 Winners	4 November 1969	4th	4	Fourth place (1966)
Romania	UEFA Group 1 Winners	16 November 1969	4th	1 (Last: 1938)	Group stage (1930, 1934, 1938)
Italy	UEFA Group 3 Winners	22 November 1969	7th	3	Winners (1934, 1938)
Czechoslovakia	UEFA Group 2 Winners	3 December 1969	6th	1 (Last: 1962)	Runners-up (1934, 1962)
Bulgaria	UEFA Group 8 Winners	7 December 1969	3rd	3	Group stage (1962, 1966)
Israel	AFC/OFC Winners	14 December 1969	1st	1	—

== Confederation qualification ==
=== AFC and OFC ===
- First Round: Australia, Japan, South Korea and Rhodesia were included in group A, but the other three countries involved refused to play against Rhodesia due to political concerns regarding apartheid. Australia, Japan and South Korea played against each other twice in South Korea and after the matches in Seoul were completed, FIFA determined that the winner would still have to meet Rhodesia in what resulted to be the second round of Group A. North Korea was included in Group B but withdrew for political reasons and the group was contested by only two teams. The group winners would advance to the Final Round.
- Final Round: The 2 teams played against each other on a home-and-away basis. The winner would qualify.

==== First round ====
Rank	Team	Pts	Pld	W	D	L	GF	GA	GD
1	Australia	6	4	2	2	0	7	4	3
2	South Korea	4	4	1	2	1	6	5	1
3	Japan	2	4	0	2	2	4	8	−4

==== Second round ====
Rank	Team	Pts	Pld	W	D	L	GF	GA	GD
1=	Australia	2	2	0	2	0	1	1	0
1=	Rhodesia	2	2	0	2	0	1	1	0

==== Play-off ====
Rank	Team	Pts	Pld	W	D	L	GF	GA	GD
1	Australia	2	1	1	0	0	3	1	+2
2	Rhodesia	0	1	0	0	1	1	3	−2

===== Group 2 =====
Rank	Team	Pts	Pld	W	D	L	GF	GA	GD
1	Israel	4	2	2	0	0	6	0	+6
2	New Zealand	0	2	0	0	2	0	6	−6
—	North Korea	withdrew							

==== Final round ====
Rank	Team	Pts	Pld	W	D	L	GF	GA	GD	Qualification
1	Israel	3	2	1	1	0	2	1	+1	Final Tournament
2	Australia	1	2	0	1	1	1	2	−1	

=== CAF ===
FIFA rejected the entries of Guinea and Zaire. There would be three rounds of play:

- First Round: Ghana received a bye and advanced to the Second Round directly. The remaining 10 teams were paired up to play knockout matches on a home-and-away basis. The winners (determined by aggregate score) would advance to the Second Round.
- Second Round: The 6 teams were paired up to play knockout matches on a home-and-away basis. The winners would advance to the Final Round.
- Final Round: The 3 teams played against each other on a home-and-away basis. The group winner would qualify.

==== First round ====
Team 1	Agg.	Team 2	1st leg	2nd leg	3rd leg
Zambia	6–6	Sudan	4–2	2–4 (aet)	
Morocco	4–2	Senegal	1–0	1–2	2–0
Algeria	1–2	Tunisia	1–2	0–0	
Nigeria	4–3	Cameroon	1–1	3–2	
Libya	3–5	Ethiopia	2–0	1–5	
Ghana	Bye				

==== Second round ====
Team 1	Agg.	Team 2	1st leg	2nd leg	3rd leg
Tunisia	2–2	Morocco	0–0	0–0 (aet)	2–2 (aet)
Ethiopia	2–4	Sudan	1–1	1–3	
Nigeria	3–2	Ghana	2–1	1–1	

==== Final round ====
Rank	Team	Pts	Pld	W	D	L	GF	GA	GD	Qualification
1	Morocco	5	4	2	1	1	5	3	+2	Final Tournament
2	Nigeria	4	4	1	2	1	8	7	+1	
3	Sudan	3	4	0	3	1	5	8	−3	

=== CONCACAF ===
FIFA rejected the entry of Cuba. There would be three rounds of play:

- First Round: The remaining 12 teams were divided into 4 groups of 3 teams each. The teams played against each other on a home-and-away basis. The group winners would advance to the Semifinal Round.
- Semifinal Round: The 4 teams were paired up to play knockout matches on a home-and-away basis. The winners would advance to the Final Round.
- Final Round: The 2 teams played against each other on a home-and-away basis. The winner would qualify.

==== First round ====
===== Group 1 =====
Rank	Team	Pts	Pld	W	D	L	GF	GA	GD
1	United States	6	4	3	0	1	11	6	+5
2	Canada	5	4	2	1	1	8	3	+5
3	Bermuda	1	4	0	1	3	2	12	−10

===== Group 2 =====
Rank	Team	Pts	Pld	W	D	L	GF	GA	GD
1	Haiti	5	4	2	1	1	9	5	+4
2	Guatemala	4	4	1	2	1	5	3	+2
3	Trinidad and Tobago	3	4	1	1	2	4	10	−6

===== Group 3 =====
Rank	Team	Pts	Pld	W	D	L	GF	GA	GD
1	Honduras	7	4	3	1	0	7	2	+5
2	Costa Rica	5	4	2	1	1	7	3	+4
3	Jamaica	0	4	0	0	4	2	11	−9

===== Group 4 =====
Rank	Team	Pts	Pld	W	D	L	GF	GA	GD
1	El Salvador	6	4	3	0	1	10	5	+5
2	Suriname	4	4	2	0	2	10	9	+1
3	Netherlands Antilles	2	4	1	0	3	3	9	−6

==== Second round ====
===== Group 1 =====
Rank	Team	Pts	Pld	W	D	L	GF	GA	GD
1	Haiti	4	2	2	0	0	3	0	+3
2	United States	0	2	0	0	2	0	3	−3

===== Group 2 =====
Rank	Team	Pts	Pld	W	D	L	GF	GA	GD
1=	El Salvador	2	2	1	0	1	3	1	+2
1=	Honduras	2	2	1	0	1	1	3	−2

==== Play-off ====
Rank	Team	Pts	Pld	W	D	L	GF	GA	GD
1	El Salvador	2	1	1	0	0	3	2	+1
2	Honduras	0	1	0	0	1	2	3	–1

==== Third round ====
Rank	Team	Pts	Pld	W	D	L	GF	GA	GD
1=	Haiti	2	2	1	0	1	4	2	+2
1=	El Salvador	2	2	1	0	1	2	4	−2

==== Play-off ====
Rank	Team	Pts	Pld	W	D	L	GF	GA	GD	Qualification
1	El Salvador	2	1	1	0	0	1	0	+1	Final Tournament
2	Haiti	0	1	0	0	1	0	1	–1	

=== CONMEBOL ===
The 10 teams were divided into 3 groups; two groups with 3 teams and one group with 4 teams. The teams played against each other on a home-and-away basis. The group winners would qualify.

==== Group 1 ====
Rank	Team	Pts	Pld	W	D	L	GF	GA	GD	Qualification
1	Peru	5	4	2	1	1	7	4	+3	Final Tournament
2	Bolivia	4	4	2	0	2	5	6	−1	
3	Argentina	3	4	1	1	2	4	6	−2	

==== Group 2 ====
Rank	Team	Pts	Pld	W	D	L	GF	GA	GD	Qualification
1	Brazil	12	6	6	0	0	23	2	+21	Final Tournament
2	Paraguay	8	6	4	0	2	6	5	+1	
3	Colombia	3	6	1	1	4	7	12	−5	
4	Venezuela	1	6	0	1	5	1	18	−17	

==== Group 3 ====
Rank	Team	Pts	Pld	W	D	L	GF	GA	GD	Qualification
1	Uruguay	7	4	3	1	0	5	0	+5	Final Tournament
2	Chile	4	4	1	2	1	5	4	+1	
3	Ecuador	1	4	0	1	3	2	8	−6	

=== UEFA ===
(30 teams competing for 8 berths)

FIFA rejected the entry of Albania. The remaining 29 teams were divided into 8 groups, 3 groups with 3 teams and 5 groups with 4 teams. The teams played against each other on a home-and-away basis. The group winners would qualify.

Group 1

Team	Pld	Pts	Qualification
Romania	6	8	Final Tournament
Greece	6	7	
Switzerland	6	5	
Portugal	6	4	

Group 2

Team	Pld	Pts	Qualification
Czechoslovakia	6	9	Final Tournament
Hungary	6	9	
Denmark	6	5	
Republic of Ireland	6	1	

Group 3

Team	Pld	Pts	Qualification
Italy	4	7	Final Tournament
East Germany	4	5	
Wales	4	0	

Group 4

Team	Pld	Pts	Qualification
Soviet Union	4	7	Final Tournament
Northern Ireland	4	5	
Turkey	4	0	

Group 5

Team	Pld	Pts	Qualification
Sweden	4	6	Final Tournament
France	4	4	
Norway	4	2	

Group 6

Team	Pld	Pts	Qualification
Belgium	6	9	Final Tournament
Yugoslavia	6	7	
Spain	6	6	
Finland	6	2	

Group 7

Team	Pld	Pts	Qualification
West Germany	6	11	Final Tournament
Scotland	6	7	
Austria	6	6	
Cyprus	6	0	

Group 8

Team	Pld	Pts	Qualification
Bulgaria	6	9	Final Tournament
Poland	6	8	
Netherlands	6	7	
Luxembourg	6	0	

== Goalscorers ==
10 goals

- (Brazil) Tostão

9 goals

- (West Germany) Gerd Müller

7 goals

- (El Salvador) Juan Ramón Martínez
- (Italy) Gigi Riva
- (Poland) Włodzimierz Lubański

6 goals

- (Belgium) Johan Devrindt
- (Brazil) Pelé
- (Hungary) Ferenc Bene
- (Poland) Kazimierz Deyna
- (Scotland) Colin Stein
- (Sweden) Ove Kindvall

5 goals

- (Austria) Erich Hof
- (Belgium) Odilon Polleunis
- (Czechoslovakia) Jozef Adamec

4 goals

- (Australia) Tom McColl
- (Austria) Helmut Redl
- (Bulgaria) Georgi Asparuhov
- (Bulgaria) Hristo Bonev
- (Haiti) Guy Saint-Vil
- (Nigeria) Garba Okoye
- (Poland) Andrzej Jarosik
- (Socialist Federal Republic of Yugoslavia) Dragan Džajić

3 goals

- (Brazil) Jairzinho
- (Czechoslovakia) Karol Jokl
- (Denmark) Ole Sørensen
- (Finland) Arto Tolsa
- (France) Hervé Revelli
- (Greece) Vasilis Botinos
- (Greece) Giorgos Sideris
- (Haiti) Guy François
- (Haiti) Joseph Obas
- (Hungary) Antal Dunai
- (Israel) Mordechai Spiegler
- (Morocco) Houmane Jarir
- (Norway) Ola Dybwad-Olsen
- (Portugal) Eusébio
- (Romania) Florea Dumitrache
- (Scotland) Alan Gilzean
- (Spain) José Eulogio Gárate
- (United States) Peter Millar
- (United States) Willy Roy
- (West Germany) Wolfgang Overath
- (Trinidad and Tobago) Warren Archibald
- (Socialist Federal Republic of Yugoslavia) Vahidin Musemić
- (Socialist Federal Republic of Yugoslavia) Slaven Zambata
- (Zambia) Emment Kapengwe

2 goals

- (Argentina) Rafael Albrecht
- (Australia) Ray Baartz
- (Australia) Johnny Watkiss
- (Belgium) Wilfried Puis
- (Bolivia) Raúl Alvarez
- (Brazil) Eduardo Antunes Coimbra
- (Bulgaria) Dinko Dermendzhiev
- (Canada) Ralph McPate
- (Canada) Nick Papadakis
- (Canada) Tibor Vigh
- (Chile) Adolfo Olivares
- (Chile) Francisco Valdéz
- (Colombia) Jaime González
- (Colombia) Hermenegildo Segrera
- (Costa Rica) Eduardo Chavarría
- (Czechoslovakia) Vladimír Hagara
- (Czechoslovakia) Ladislav Kuna
- (Czechoslovakia) Andrej Kvašňák
- (East Germany) Wolfram Löwe
- (East Germany) Eberhard Vogel
- (El Salvador) Elmer Acevedo
- (El Salvador) Víctor Azúcar
- (El Salvador) Juan Francisco Barraza
- (El Salvador) Joel Estrada
- (El Salvador) José Quintanilla
- (Ethiopia) Zerga Geremew
- (Ethiopia) Asmeron Germa
- (Finland) Tommy Lindholm
- (France) Jean-Claude Bras
- (Greece) Giorgos Dedes
- (Haiti) Hugues Guillaume
- (Honduras) Rigoberto Gómez
- (Honduras) Donaldo Rosales
- (Hungary) Lajos Kocsis
- (Republic of Ireland) Don Givens
- (Israel) Yehoshua Feigenbaum
- (Israel) Giora Spiegel
- (Italy) Sandro Mazzola
- (Japan) Teruki Miyamoto
- (Luxembourg) Johny Léonard
- (Morocco) Mohammed El Filali
- (Netherlands) Theo Pahlplatz
- (Nigeria) Mohammed Lawal
- (Nigeria) Olumuyiwa Oshode
- (Northern Ireland) Terry Harkin
- (Paraguay) Saturnino Arrúa
- (Peru) Oswaldo Ramírez
- (Portugal) Jacinto Santos
- (Rhodesia) Bobby Chalmers
- (Scotland) Bobby Murdoch
- (South Korea) Jeong Kang-ji
- (South Korea) Park Soo-il
- (Soviet Union) Kakhi Asatiani
- (Soviet Union) Volodymyr Muntyan
- (Soviet Union) Givi Nodia
- (Spain) Amancio Amaro
- (Sudan) Nasr El-Din Abbas
- (Sudan) Aboubakar Bakheit
- (Sudan) Ali Gagarin
- (Sudan) Abubakr Osman
- (Suriname (Kingdom of the Netherlands)) Paul Ruben Corte
- (Suriname (Kingdom of the Netherlands)) Jules Lagadeau
- (Suriname (Kingdom of the Netherlands)) Ruud Schoonhoven
- (Suriname (Kingdom of the Netherlands)) Roy Vanenburg
- (Sweden) Bo Larsson
- (Switzerland) Fritz Künzli
- (Switzerland) Georges Vuilleumier
- (Tunisia) Ezzedine Chakroun
- (United States) Gerry Baker
- (West Germany) Helmut Haller
- (Socialist Federal Republic of Yugoslavia) Josip Bukal
- (Socialist Federal Republic of Yugoslavia) Metodije Spasovski

1 goal

- (Algeria) Boualem Amirouche
- (Argentina) Alberto Rendo
- (Argentina) Aníbal Tarabini
- (Australia) Willie Rutherford
- (Australia) Johnny Warren
- (Austria) Wilhelm Kreuz
- (Austria) Helmut Siber
- (Austria) August Starek
- (Belgium) Léon Semmeling
- (Bermuda) Clyde Best
- (Bermuda) Winston Trott
- (Bolivia) Ramiro Blacut
- (Bolivia) Juan Américo Díaz
- (Brazil) Rivellino
- (Bulgaria) Dimitar Penev
- (Bulgaria) Dimitar Yakimov
- (Cameroon) David Ayo
- (Cameroon) Dieudonné Bassanguen
- (Cameroon) Norbert Owona
- (Canada) Norman Patterson
- (Canada) Sergio Zanatta
- (Colombia) Jorge Ramírez Gallego
- (Colombia) Orlando Mesa
- (Colombia) Javier Tamayo
- (Costa Rica) Leonel Hernández
- (Costa Rica) Edgar Núñez
- (Costa Rica) Roy Sáenz
- (Costa Rica) Walford Vaughns
- (Costa Rica) Mario Vega
- (Cyprus) Panicos Efthimiadis
- (Cyprus) Nicos Kantzilieris
- (Czechoslovakia) Dušan Kabát
- (Czechoslovakia) František Veselý
- (Denmark) Bent Jensen
- (Denmark) Ulrik Le Fevre
- (Denmark) Ole Madsen
- (East Germany) Henning Frenzel
- (East Germany) Hans-Jürgen Kreische
- (East Germany) Peter Rock
- (Ecuador) Félix Lasso
- (Ecuador) Tom Rodríguez
- (El Salvador) Mauricio Ernesto González
- (El Salvador) Mauricio Alonso Rodríguez
- (Ethiopia) Kebede Asfaw
- (Ethiopia) Emmanuel Feseha
- (Ethiopia) Mengistu Worku
- (Finland) Turo Flink
- (France) Jean Djorkaeff
- (Ghana) Abeka Ankrah
- (Ghana) Emmanuel Ola
- (Greece) Mimis Domazos
- (Greece) Kostas Elefterakis
- (Greece) Giorgos Koudas
- (Greece) Mimis Papaioannou
- (Guatemala) Édgar González
- (Guatemala) Nelson Melgar
- (Guatemala) David Stokes
- (Haiti) Claude Barthélemy
- (Haiti) Jean-Claude Désir
- (Haiti) Reynold Saint Surin
- (Haiti) Philippe Vorbe
- (Honduras) José Cardona
- (Honduras) Rafael Dick
- (Honduras) Reynaldo Mejia
- (Honduras) Marco Antonio Mendoza
- (Honduras) Jorge Urquía
- (Honduras) Leonard Wells
- (Hungary) Flórián Albert
- (Hungary) János Farkas
- (Hungary) László Fazekas
- (Hungary) Zoltán Halmosi
- (Hungary) Lajos Puskás
- (Hungary) Lajos Szűcs
- (Republic of Ireland) Eamonn Rogers
- (Italy) Angelo Domenghini
- (Jamaica) Lascelles Dunkley
- (Jamaica) Evan Welsh
- (Japan) Yasuyuki Kuwahara
- (Japan) Masashi Watanabe
- (Libya) Mahmoud Al-Jahani
- (Libya) Ahmed Ben Soed
- (Libya) Mohamed Koussa
- (Luxembourg) Josy Kirchens
- (Luxembourg) Paul Philipp
- (Morocco) Hassan Akesbi
- (Morocco) Driss Bamous
- (Morocco) Boujemaa Benkhrif
- (Morocco) Ahmed Faras
- (Morocco) Cherkaoui Hafnaoui
- (Morocco) Moulay Khanousi
- (Netherlands) Johan Cruyff
- (Netherlands) Dick van Dijk
- (Netherlands) Willem van Hanegem
- (Netherlands) Wim Jansen
- (Netherlands) Sjaak Roggeveen
- (Netherlands) Wietse Veenstra
- (Netherlands) Henk Wery
- (Netherlands Antilles) Wouter Brokke
- (Netherlands Antilles) Antonio Martina
- (Netherlands Antilles) Elcio Martina
- (Nigeria) Joseph Aghoghovbia
- (Nigeria) Peter Anieke
- (Nigeria) Sam Garba
- (Nigeria) Sebastian Broderick Imasuen
- (Nigeria) Sunday Ineh
- (Nigeria) Augustine Ofuokwu
- (Nigeria) Samuel Opone
- (Northern Ireland) George Best
- (Northern Ireland) William Campbell
- (Northern Ireland) Derek Dougan
- (Northern Ireland) Eric McMordie
- (Northern Ireland) Jimmy Nicholson
- (Norway) Odd Iversen
- (Paraguay) Lorenzo Gimenez
- (Paraguay) Aurelio Martínez
- (Paraguay) Pablo Rojas
- (Paraguay) Alcides Sosa
- (Peru) Roberto Chale
- (Peru) Luis Cruzado
- (Peru) Teófilo Cubillas
- (Peru) Alberto Gallardo
- (Peru) Pedro Pablo León
- (Poland) Bronisław Bula
- (Poland) Jerzy Wilim
- (Portugal) José Augusto de Almeida
- (Portugal) Jacinto João
- (Portugal) Fernando Peres
- (Romania) Emerich Dembrovschi
- (Romania) Nicolae Dobrin
- (Romania) Flavius Domide
- (Scotland) Billy Bremner
- (Scotland) Tommy Gemmell
- (Scotland) Eddie Gray
- (Scotland) Willie Henderson
- (Scotland) Jimmy Johnstone
- (Scotland) Denis Law
- (Scotland) Billy McNeill
- (Senegal) Emile Pierre Diéme
- (Senegal) Abdoulaye Makhtar Diop
- (South Korea) Kim Ki-bok
- (South Korea) Lee Yi-woo
- (Soviet Union) Anatoliy Byshovets
- (Soviet Union) Vitaliy Khmelnytskyi
- (Spain) Juan Manuel Asensi
- (Spain) Miguel Ángel Bustillo
- (Spain) Pirri
- (Spain) Joaquín Sierra
- (Spain) Manuel Velázquez
- (Sudan) Gadalla Kheir El-Sayed Ali
- (Sudan) Osman El-Fadil
- (Sudan) Omar Ali Hasab El-Rasoul
- (Sudan) Abdel Kafi El-Sheikh
- (Sudan) Abdel-Wahab Abdel-Fadil Jadallah
- (Sudan) Awad Nasr Musa
- (Sudan) Ahmed Bushara Wahba
- (Suriname (Kingdom of the Netherlands)) Stuart Oosthuizen
- (Suriname (Kingdom of the Netherlands)) Edwin Schal
- (Sweden) Leif Eriksson
- (Sweden) Ove Grahn
- (Sweden) Roland Grip
- (Sweden) Örjan Persson
- (Switzerland) René-Pierre Quentin
- (Trinidad and Tobago) Everald Cummings
- (Tunisia) Tahar Chaïbi
- (Tunisia) Abdesselem Cheman
- (Turkey) Ender Konca
- (Turkey) Ogün Altıparmak
- (United States) Dietrich Albrecht
- (United States) Siegfried Stritzl
- (Uruguay) Atilio Ancheta
- (Uruguay) Rúben Bareño
- (Uruguay) Julio César Cortés
- (Uruguay) Pedro Rocha
- (Uruguay) Oscar Zubía
- (Venezuela) Luis Mendoza Benedetto
- (Wales) Mike England
- (Wales) David Powell
- (Wales) John Toshack
- (West Germany) Klaus Fichtel
- (West Germany) Sigfried Held
- (West Germany) Horst-Dieter Höttges
- (West Germany) Reinhard Libuda
- (West Germany) Max Lorenz
- (Socialist Federal Republic of Yugoslavia) Rudolf Belin
- (Socialist Federal Republic of Yugoslavia) Ivica Osim
- (Socialist Federal Republic of Yugoslavia) Miroslav Pavlović
- (Socialist Federal Republic of Yugoslavia) Denijal Pirić
- (Socialist Federal Republic of Yugoslavia) Edin Sprečo
- (Zambia) Godfrey Chitalu
- (Zambia) Sandy Kaposa
- (Zambia) Dickson Makwaza

1 own goal

- (Australia) David Zeman (playing against Israel)
- (Austria) Johann Eigenstiller (playing against West Germany)
- (Bermuda) Rudolph Smith (playing against the United States)
- (Ecuador) Ramiro Tobar (playing against Chile)
- (Japan) Aritatsu Ogi (playing against Australia)
- (Paraguay) Valentín Mendoza (playing against Brazil)
- (Peru) Héctor Chumpitaz (playing against Bolivia)
- (Portugal) José Torres (playing against Greece)
- (Rhodesia) Phillemon Tegire (playing against Australia)
- (Switzerland) Bruno Michaud (playing against Romania)
- (Trinidad and Tobago) Tyrone de la Bastide (playing against Guatemala)
- (Trinidad and Tobago) Selwyn Murren (playing against Guatemala)

== Notes ==
- In the African zone, aggregate score was used to determine the winners of two-legged ties. However, different tie-breakers were used in the matches when the aggregate score was tied.
- Morocco was the first African team to qualify since Egypt in the 1934 World Cup.
- As a result of the hostile relationship between El Salvador and Honduras, and rioting during the qualification matches between them, the short-lived Football War broke out between the two countries.
- Israel qualified for their only World Cup to date as an Asian team. However, soon after this, they were expelled from the Asian Football Confederation, and now compete in the European zone as they are now a member of UEFA.
