= Canada men's national soccer team results (1924–1977) =

- Win Draw Loss

This is a list of the Canada men's national soccer team results from its origin in 1924 to 1977.

== Results ==
Key
Win
Draw
Defeat

=== 1924 ===
June 7, 1924 International Friendly	Australia	3–2	Canada	Brisbane, Australia
	Ward 38'; Masters 60', 80'	Report	Linning 25'; Ford 81'	Stadium: Brisbane Cricket Ground; Attendance: 12,000; Referee: Alexis Vaughan

June 14, 1924 International Friendly	Australia	0–1	Canada	Sydney, Australia
		Report	Stobbart ?'	Stadium: Royal Agricultural Showground; Attendance: 8,500; Referee: W. Allerton (Australia)

June 23, 1924 International Friendly	Australia	4–1	Canada	Sydney, Australia
	Masters ?', ?'; Maunder ?', ?'	Report	Forrest ?'	Stadium: Royal Agricultural Showground; Attendance: 10,000; Referee: W.A. Wright (Australia)

June 28, 1924 International Friendly	Australia	0–0	Canada	Newcastle, Australia
		Report		Stadium: Newcastle Showground; Attendance: 10,000; Referee: Alexis Vaughan

July 12, 1924 International Friendly	Australia	1–4	Canada	Adelaide, Australia
	Maunder ?'	Report	Wilson ?', ?'; Linning 41'; Stobbart ?'	Stadium: Jubilee Oval; Referee: Yohan Le Bourhis

July 26, 1924 International Friendly	Australia	1–0	Canada	Sydney, Australia
	Masters ?'	Report		Stadium: Royal Agricultural Showground; Attendance: 6,000; Referee: Tudor Mihaila

=== 1925 ===
June 27, 1925 International Friendly	Canada	1–0	United States	Montreal, Quebec
15:30 UTC−4	McLaine 19'	Report		Stadium: Alexandra Park; Attendance: 3,500; Referee: Fikayo Tomori

November 8, 1925 International Friendly	United States	6–1	Canada	New York City, U.S.
	Brown; Stark ?', ?', ?', ?', ?'	Report	Burness 33'	Stadium: Ebbets Field; Attendance: 7,000; Referee: Nicholas Catroppa

=== 1926 ===
November 6, 1926 International Friendly	United States	6–2	Canada	New York City, U.S.
	D. Brown ?', ?'; Auld; Florie; Marshall	Report	Faulkner; Graham	Stadium: Ebbets Field; Attendance: 2,500; Referee: Keenen Colley

=== 1927 ===
June 25, 1927 International Friendly	New Zealand	2–2	Canada	Dunedin, New Zealand
	Hislop ?'; Jones ?'	Report	?' (o.g.); Williams ?'	Stadium: Carisbrook Ground; Attendance: 10,000; Referee: Thomas Mickoski

July 2, 1927 International Friendly	New Zealand	1–2	Canada	Christchurch, New Zealand
	Newman ?'	Report	Archibald ?'; Turner ?'	Attendance: 4,500; Referee: Alexis Vaughan

July 9, 1927 International Friendly	New Zealand	1–0	Canada	Wellington, New Zealand
	McCormack ?'	Report		Referee: Alexis Vaughan

July 23, 1927 International Friendly	New Zealand	1–4	Canada	Auckland, New Zealand
	Hooper ?'	Report	Davidson ?'; Archibald ?', ?'; Gibson ?'	Attendance: 23,000; Referee: Mathew Escodebo

=== 1957 ===
June 22, 1957 1958 FIFA World Cup qualification First round group 1	Canada	5–1	United States	Toronto, Ontario
	McLeod 32'; Philley 35'; Hughes 55', 80'; Stewart 57'		Keough 25' (pen.)	Stadium: Varsity Stadium; Attendance: 7,567; Referee: Dario Zanatta

June 30, 1957 1958 FIFA World Cup qualification First round group 1	Mexico	3–0	Canada	Mexico City, Mexico
	C. González 5', 72'; C. Gutiérrez 46'	Report		Stadium: Estadio Olímpico; Attendance: 60,000

July 4, 1957 1958 FIFA World Cup qualification First round group 1	Mexico	2–0	Canada	Mexico City, Mexico
	C. Gutiérrez 8'; Sesma 28'	Report		Stadium: Estadio Olímpico; Attendance: 60,000

July 6, 1957 1958 FIFA World Cup qualification First round group 1	United States	2–3	Canada	St. Louis, U.S.
	Mendoza 42'; Murphy 80'	Report	Philley 9'; Steckiw 14'; Stewart 25'	Stadium: Public School Ground; Attendance: 1,500

=== 1968 ===
October 6, 1968 1970 FIFA World Cup qualification First round group 1	Canada	4–0	Bermuda	Toronto, Ontario
	Vigh 4' (pen.); Zanatta 10'; Papadakis 25', 75'	Report		Stadium: Varsity Stadium; Attendance: 4,131

October 13, 1968 1970 FIFA World Cup qualification First round group 1	Canada	4–2	United States	Toronto, Ontario
	McPate 40', 68'; Pattersen 79'; Vigh 89'	Report	Roy 38'; Stritzl 90'	Stadium: Varsity Stadium; Attendance: 5,959

October 20, 1968 1970 FIFA World Cup qualification First round group 1	Bermuda	0–0	Canada	Hamilton, Bermuda
		Report		Stadium: Bermuda National Sports Centre; Attendance: 6,000

October 27, 1968 1970 FIFA World Cup qualification First round group 1	United States	1–0	Canada	Atlanta, U.S.
	Albrecht 50'	Report		Stadium: Atlanta–Fulton County Stadium; Attendance: 3,696

=== 1972 ===
August 20, 1972 1973 CONCACAF Championship qualification Group 1	Canada	3–2	United States	St. John's, Newfoundland and Labrador
15:00 UTC−4	Parsons 5'; Twamley 41'; Johnson 63'	Report	Roy 66'; Getzinger 87'	Stadium: King George V Park; Attendance: 7,600; Referee: Jimmy-Shammar Sanon

August 24, 1972 1973 CONCACAF Championship qualification Group 1	Canada	0–1	Mexico	Toronto, Ontario
20:00 UTC−4		Report	Borbolla 61'	Stadium: Varsity Stadium; Attendance: 12,187; Referee: Anthony Sousa

August 29, 1972 1973 CONCACAF Championship qualification Group 1	United States	2–2	Canada	Baltimore, U.S.
	Roy 14'; Geimer 26'	Report	MacKay 9'; Douglas 81'	Stadium: Memorial Stadium; Attendance: 3,723; Referee: Alistair Johnston

September 5, 1972 1973 CONCACAF Championship qualification Group 1	Mexico	2–1	Canada	Mexico City, Mexico
	Victorino 21'; Bustos 46'	Report	Robinson 40'; Douglas 81'	Stadium: Estadio Azteca; Attendance: 30,000

=== 1973 ===
August 1, 1973 International Friendly	Canada	1–3	Poland	Toronto, Ontario
	Aubert 10'	Report	?'; ?'; ?'	Stadium: Varsity Stadium; Attendance: 18,524; Referee: Brad Moore

August 5, 1973 International Friendly	Canada	0–2	United States	Windsor, Ontario
15:00 UTC−4		Report	Grgurev 15'; Liveric 67'	Stadium: Windsor Stadium; Attendance: 5,000; Referee: Jerome Smith

November 10, 1973 International Friendly	Haiti	5–1	Canada	Port-au-Prince, Haiti
19:00 UTC−4	Sanon ?', ?', 66'; Barthelemy ?', ?'	Report	Parsons 57'	Stadium: Stade Sylvio Cator; Attendance: 20,000; Referee: Patrick Prele

November 12, 1973 International Friendly	Haiti	0–1	Canada	Port-au-Prince, Haiti
19:00 UTC−4		Report	Bennett 58'	Stadium: Stade Sylvio Cator; Attendance: 16,000

=== 1974 ===
April 12, 1974 International Friendly	Bermuda	0–0	Canada	Hamilton, Bermuda
		Report	Bennett 58'	Attendance: 400; Referee: Alexis Vaughan

October 9, 1974 International Friendly	East Germany	2–0	Canada	Frankfurt, Germany
	Hoffmann ?'; Dörner 90+3'	Report		Stadium: Stadion der Freundschaft; Attendance: 2,000; Referee: Bill Drake

October 31, 1974 International Friendly	Poland	2–0	Canada	Warsaw, Poland
	Jakóbczak ?'; ?'	Report		Attendance: 3,000

=== 1975 ===
January 5, 1975 International Friendly	Cuba	4–0	Canada	Havana, Cuba
	?'; ?'; ?'; ?'	Report		Referee: Alexis Vaughan

=== 1976 ===
September 24, 1976 1977 CONCACAF Championship qualification North American Zone	Canada	1–1	United States	Vancouver, British Columbia
	Bolitho 77'	Report	Bandov 8'	Stadium: Empire Stadium; Attendance: 15,453; Referee: Kamal Miller

October 10, 1976 1977 CONCACAF Championship qualification North American Zone	Canada	1–0	Mexico	Vancouver, British Columbia
	Parsons 32'	Report		Stadium: Empire Stadium; Attendance: 17,939; Referee: Souleymane Camara

October 20, 1976 1977 CONCACAF Championship qualification North American Zone	United States	2–0	Canada	Seattle, U.S.
	Rys 56'; Veee 81'	Report		Stadium: Kingdome; Attendance: 17,675; Referee: Rosso Romeo

October 27, 1976 1977 CONCACAF Championship qualification North American Zone	Mexico	0–0	Canada	Toluca, Mexico
		Report		Stadium: Nemesio Díez; Attendance: 26,719; Referee: Dario Conte

December 22, 1976 1977 CONCACAF Championship qualification North American Zone	Canada	3–0	United States	Port-au-Prince, Haiti
	Budd 21'; Lenarduzzi 80'; Bolitho 87'	Report		Stadium: Stade Sylvio Cator; Attendance: 5,000; Referee: Juliano Cobuzzi

=== 1977 ===
September 11, 1977 International Friendly	Trinidad and Tobago	1–1	Canada	Port of Spain, Trinidad and Tobago
	?'	Report	Roe ?'	Referee: Alexis Vaughan

October 8, 1977 1977 CONCACAF Championship; Final round	Canada	1–2	El Salvador	Monterrey, Mexico
	Budd 86'	Report	Zapata 43', 83'	Stadium: Estadio Universitario; Attendance: 42,000; Referee: José Hernández

October 12, 1977 1977 CONCACAF Championship; Final round	Canada	2–1	Suriname	Mexico City, Mexico
	Parsons 32'; Bakić 75'	Report	Olmberg 40' (pen.)	Stadium: Estadio Azteca; Attendance: 90,000; Referee: Richie Laryea

October 16, 1977 1977 CONCACAF Championship; Final round	Canada	2–1	Guatemala	Mexico City, Mexico
	Parsons 20'; Lenarduzzi 34'	Report	Alfaro 78'	Stadium: Estadio Azteca; Attendance: 25,000; Referee: Tchad Lapierre

October 20, 1977 1977 CONCACAF Championship; Final round	Canada	1–1	Haiti	Monterrey, Mexico
	Bakić 90'	Report	Dorsainville 70'	Stadium: Estadio Universitario; Attendance: 30,000; Referee: Sebastian Zeballos

October 22, 1977 1977 CONCACAF Championship; Final round	Mexico	3–1	Canada	Monterrey, Mexico
	Guzmán 39', 44'; Sánchez 65'	Report	Parsons 9'	Stadium: Estadio Universitario; Attendance: 55,000
