= 1970 FIFA World Cup qualification (CONCACAF) =

Tournament details
- Dates: 6 October 1968 – 8 October 1969
- Teams: 12

Tournament statistics
- Matches played: 32
- Goals scored: 97 (3.03 per match)
- Attendance: 386,978 (12,093 per match)
- Top scorer: (El Salvador) Juan Ramón Martínez (7 goals)

The North, Central American and Caribbean section of the 1970 FIFA World Cup qualification acted as qualifiers for the 1970 FIFA World Cup in Mexico, for national teams which are members of the Confederation of North, Central American and Caribbean Association Football (CONCACAF). Twelve teams participated in the tournament to compete for one place in the final tournament.

== Format ==
The qualification structure was as follows:

- First round: The remaining 12 teams were divided into 4 groups of 3 teams each. The teams played against each other on a home-and-away basis. The group winners would advance to the semi-final round.
- Second round: The 4 teams were paired up to play knockout matches on a home-and-away basis. The winners would advance to the Final Round.
- Third round: The 2 teams played against each other on a home-and-away basis. The winner would qualify.

== Entrants ==
Twelve national teams entered into CONCACAF qualification. Another team, Cuba, had their entry rejected.

- Bermuda
- Canada
- Costa Rica
- El Salvador
- Guatemala
- Haiti
- Honduras
- Jamaica
- Netherlands Antilles
- Suriname
- Trinidad and Tobago
- United States

== First round ==
=== Group 1 ===
Rank	Team	Pts	Pld	W	D	L	GF	GA	GD
1	United States	6	4	3	0	1	11	6	+5
2	Canada	5	4	2	1	1	8	3	+5
3	Bermuda	1	4	0	1	3	2	12	−10

6 October 1968

Canada	4–0	Bermuda
Vigh 3' (pen.); Zanatta 10'; Papadakis 25', 75'

Toronto, Ontario, Canada
Attendance: 3,432
Referee: Segura (Mexico)

13 October 1968

Canada	4–2	United States
McPate 40', 68'; Patterson 79'; Vigh 89'		Roy 38'; Stritzl 89'

Toronto, Ontario, Canada
Attendance: 5,959
Referee: Figaroa (Netherlands Antilles)

20 October 1968

Bermuda	0–0	Canada

Hamilton, Bermuda
Attendance: 5,324
Referee: Koetsier (Netherlands Antilles)

26 October 1968

United States	1–0	Canada
Albrecht 50'

Atlanta, United States
Attendance: 2,727
Referee: Soto Paris (Costa Rica)

3 November 1968

United States	6–2	Bermuda
Millar 22', 63', 82'; Baker 25', 56'; Roy 60'		Trott 34'; Best 51'

Kansas City, United States
Attendance: 2,265
Referee: Fingal (Netherlands Antilles)

11 November 1968

Bermuda	0–2	United States
		Smith 8' (o.g.); Roy 41'

Hamilton, Bermuda
Attendance: 2,942
Referee: Felipe (Mexico)

United States advanced to the semi-final round.

=== Group 2 ===
Rank	Team	Pts	Pld	W	D	L	GF	GA	GD
1	Haiti	5	4	2	1	1	9	5	+4
2	Guatemala	4	4	1	2	1	5	3	+2
3	Trinidad and Tobago	3	4	1	1	2	4	10	−6

17 November 1968

Guatemala	4–0	Trinidad and Tobago
Stokes 30'; Murren 66' (o.g.); De la Bastide 78' (o.g.); Melgar 88'

Guatemala City, Guatemala
Attendance: 26,845
Referee: Araya Muñoz (Costa Rica)

20 November 1968

Guatemala	0–0	Trinidad and Tobago

Guatemala City, Guatemala (Note: Trinidad and Tobago and Jamaica played all of their matches away.)
Attendance: 16,215
Referee: Osorio Castillo (Mexico)

23 November 1968

Haiti	4–0	Trinidad and Tobago
Saint-Vil 39', 52'; Obas 57'; François 86'

Port-au-Prince, Haiti
Attendance: 6,368
Referee: Gamboa (Costa Rica)

25 November 1968

Haiti	2–4	Trinidad and Tobago
Guillaume 23'; Vorbe 52'		Archibald 3', 73', 85'; Cummings 42'

Port-au-Prince, Haiti
Attendance: 2,233
Referee: Archundia (Mexico)

8 December 1968

Haiti	2–0	Guatemala
Désir 15'; Barthélemy 45'

Port-au-Prince, Haiti
Attendance: 7,755
Referee: Molina (Costa Rica)

23 February 1969

Guatemala	1–1	Haiti
González 21'		Obas 64'

Guatemala City, Guatemala
Attendance: 53,728
Referee: Chaplin (Jamaica)

Haiti advanced to the semi-final round.

=== Group 3 ===
Rank	Team	Pts	Pld	W	D	L	GF	GA	GD
1	Honduras	7	4	3	1	0	7	2	+5
2	Costa Rica	5	4	2	1	1	7	3	+4
3	Jamaica	0	4	0	0	4	2	11	−9

27 November 1968

Costa Rica	3–0	Jamaica
Hernández 78'; Vaughns 88'; Sáenz 89'

San José, Costa Rica
Attendance: 14,940
Referee: De Oca (Guatemala)

1 December 1968

Costa Rica	3–1	Jamaica
Chavarría 17'; Vega 34'; Núñez 62'		Hamilton 45'

San José, Costa Rica
Attendance: 11,273
Referee: Archundia (Mexico)

5 December 1968

Honduras	3–1	Jamaica
Urquía 18'; Rosales 41'; Dick 56'		Welsh 89'

Tegucigalpa, Honduras
Attendance: 7,441
Referee: King (United States)

8 December 1968

Honduras	2–0	Jamaica
Mendoza 42'; Mejía 73'

Tegucigalpa, Honduras
Attendance: 3,577
Referee: Lee (Canada)

22 December 1968

Honduras	1–0	Costa Rica
Gómez 32'

Tegucigalpa, Honduras
Attendance: 8,724
Referee: Wuertz (United States)

29 December 1968

Costa Rica	1–1	Honduras
Chavarría 44'		Rosales 25' (pen.)

San José, Costa Rica
Attendance: 21,636
Referee: Cumberbatch (Trinidad and Tobago)

Honduras advanced to the semi-final round.

=== Group 4 ===
Rank	Team	Pts	Pld	W	D	L	GF	GA	GD
1	El Salvador	6	4	3	0	1	10	5	+5
2	Suriname	4	4	2	0	2	10	9	+1
3	Netherlands Antilles	2	4	1	0	3	3	9	−6

24 November 1968

Suriname	6–0	Netherlands Antilles
Corte 11', 59'; Schoonhoven 23', 39'; Vanenburg 67', 73'

Paramaribo, Suriname
Attendance: 8,000
Referee: King (United States)

1 December 1968

El Salvador	6–0	Suriname
Estrada 23', 84'; Azúcar 56', 88'; Barraza 87'; Martínez 90'

San Salvador, El Salvador
Attendance: 10,037
Referee: De Gourville (Trinidad and Tobago)

5 December 1968

Netherlands Antilles	2–0	Suriname
Brokke 60'; A. Martina 74'

Oranjestad, Netherlands Antilles
Attendance: 1,592
Referee: King (Canada)

12 December 1968

El Salvador	1–0	Netherlands Antilles
Quintanilla 28'

San Salvador, El Salvador
Attendance: 12,205
Referee: Di Salvatore (United States)

15 December 1968

El Salvador	2–1	Netherlands Antilles
Martínez 58'; Barraza 83'		E. Martina 51'

San Salvador, El Salvador (Note: Netherlands Antilles played its "home" game away in El Salvador.)
Attendance: 13,059
Referee: De Gourville (Trinidad and Tobago)

22 December 1968

Suriname	4–1	El Salvador
Lagadeau 16', 21'; Oosthuizen 43'; Schal 74'		González (?)

Paramaribo, Suriname
Attendance: 4,327
Referee: Downer (Trinidad and Tobago)

El Salvador advanced to the semi-final round.

== Second round ==
=== Group 1 ===
Rank	Team	Pts	Pld	W	D	L	GF	GA	GD
1	Haiti	4	2	2	0	0	3	0	+3
2	United States	0	2	0	0	2	0	3	−3

20 April 1969

Haiti	2–0	United States
Obas 8'; Saint-Vil 54'

Port-au-Prince, Haiti
Attendance: 6,917
Referee: Segura (Mexico)

11 May 1969

United States	0–1	Haiti
		Saint-Vil 43'

San Diego, United States
Attendance: 4,274
Referee: Dunstan (Bermuda)

Haiti advanced to the Final Round.

=== Group 2 ===
Rank	Team	Pts	Pld	W	D	L	GF	GA	GD
1=	El Salvador	2	2	1	0	1	3	1	+2
1=	Honduras	2	2	1	0	1	1	3	−2

8 June 1969

Honduras	1–0	El Salvador
Wells 89'

Tegucigalpa, Honduras
Attendance: 17,827
Referee: Yamasaki (Mexico)

15 June 1969

El Salvador	3–0	Honduras
Martínez 27' (pen.), 41'; Acevedo 29'

San Salvador, El Salvador
Attendance: 36,470
Referee: Van Rosberg (Netherlands Antilles)

==== Play-off ====
El Salvador and Honduras finished level on points, and a play-off on neutral ground was played to decide who would advance to the Final Round.

27 June 1969

El Salvador	3–2 (a.e.t.)	Honduras
Martínez 8', 28'; Rodríguez 101'		Gómez 22', 52'

Mexico City, Mexico
Attendance: 15,326
Referee: Abel Aguilar Elizalde (Mexico)

El Salvador advanced to the Final Round. Additionally, these matches featured prominently in the Football War.

== Third round ==
Rank	Team	Pts	Pld	W	D	L	GF	GA	GD
1=	Haiti	2	2	1	0	1	4	2	+2
1=	El Salvador	2	2	1	0	1	2	4	−2

21 September 1969

Haiti	1–2	El Salvador
Obas 59'		Acevedo 43'; Rodríguez 62'

Port-au-Prince, Haiti
Attendance: 10,415
Referee: Yamasaki (Mexico)

28 September 1969

El Salvador	0–3	Haiti
		Désir 20'; François 40'; Barthélemy 44'

San Salvador, El Salvador
Attendance: 36,403
Referee: Elizalde (Mexico)

=== Play-off ===
El Salvador and Haiti finished level on points, and a play-off on neutral ground was played to decide who would qualify.

8 October 1969

El Salvador	1–0 (a.e.t.)	Haiti
Martínez 104'

Kingston, Jamaica
Attendance: 6,742
Referee: Dunstan (Bermuda)

El Salvador qualified.

== Qualified teams ==
The following two teams from CONCACAF qualified for the final tournament.

Team	Qualified as	Qualified on	Previous appearances in FIFA World Cup
Mexico	Host	8 October 1964	6 (1930, 1950, 1954, 1958, 1962, 1966)
El Salvador	Third round winners	8 October 1969	0 (debut)

== Goalscorers ==
There were 97 goals scored in 32 matches, for an average of 3.03 goals per match.

7 goals

- (El Salvador) Juan Ramón Martínez

4 goals

- (Haiti) Guy Saint-Vil

3 goals

- (Haiti) Guy François
- (Haiti) Joseph Obas
- (Trinidad and Tobago) Warren Archibald
- (United States) Peter Millar
- (United States) Willy Roy

2 goals

- (Canada) Ralph McPate
- (Canada) Nick Papadakis
- (Canada) Tibor Vigh
- (Costa Rica) Eduardo Chavarria
- (El Salvador) Elmer Acevedo
- (El Salvador) Victor Manuel Azucar
- (El Salvador) Juan Francisco Barraza
- (El Salvador) Joel Estrada
- (El Salvador) José Quintanilla
- (Haiti) Hugues Guillaume
- (Honduras) Rigoberto Gómez
- (Honduras) Donaldo Rosales
- (Suriname (Kingdom of the Netherlands)) Paul Ruben Corte
- (Suriname (Kingdom of the Netherlands)) Jules Lagadeau
- (Suriname (Kingdom of the Netherlands)) Ruud Schoonhoven
- (Suriname (Kingdom of the Netherlands)) Roy Vanenburg
- (United States) Gerry Baker

1 goal

- (Bermuda) Clyde Best
- (Bermuda) Winston Trott
- (Canada) Norman Patterson
- (Canada) Sergio Zanatta
- (Costa Rica) Leonel Hernández
- (Costa Rica) Edgar Núñez
- (Costa Rica) Roy Sáenz
- (Costa Rica) Walford Vaughns
- (Costa Rica) Mario Vega
- (El Salvador) Mauricio Ernesto González
- (El Salvador) Mauricio Alonso Rodríguez
- (Guatemala) Édgar González
- (Guatemala) Nelson Melgar
- (Guatemala) David Stokes
- (Haiti) Claude Barthélemy
- (Haiti) Jean-Claude Désir
- (Haiti) Reynold Saint Surin
- (Haiti) Philippe Vorbe
- (Honduras) José Cardona
- (Honduras) Rafael Dick
- (Honduras) Reynaldo Mejia
- (Honduras) Marco Antonio Mendoza
- (Honduras) Jorge Urquía
- (Honduras) Leonard Wells
- (Jamaica) Lascelles Dunkley
- (Jamaica) Evan Welsh
- (Netherlands Antilles) Wouter Brokke
- (Netherlands Antilles) Antonio Martina
- (Netherlands Antilles) Elcio Martina
- (Suriname (Kingdom of the Netherlands)) Stuart Oosthuizen
- (Suriname (Kingdom of the Netherlands)) Edwin Schal
- (Trinidad and Tobago) Everald Cummings
- (United States) Dietrich Albrecht
- (United States) Siegfried Stritzl

1 own goal

- (Bermuda) Rudolph Smith (against United States)
- (Trinidad and Tobago) Tyrone de la Bastide (against Guatemala)
- (Trinidad and Tobago) Selwyn Murren (against Guatemala)
