= 1968–69 in Scottish football =

Division One champions
- Celtic

Division Two champions
- Motherwell

Scottish Cup winners
- Celtic

League Cup winners
- Celtic

Junior Cup winners
- Cambuslang Rangers

Scotland national team
- 1969 BHC, 1970 World Cup qualification

The 1968–69 season was the 96th season of competitive football in Scotland and the 72nd season of Scottish league football.

== Scottish League Division One ==
| Pos | Team | Pld | W | D | L | GF | GA | GD | Pts |
|---|---|---|---|---|---|---|---|---|---|
| 1 | Celtic | 34 | 23 | 8 | 3 | 89 | 32 | +57 | 54 |
| 2 | Rangers | 34 | 21 | 7 | 6 | 81 | 32 | +49 | 49 |
| 3 | Dunfermline Athletic | 34 | 19 | 7 | 8 | 63 | 45 | +18 | 45 |
| 4 | Kilmarnock | 34 | 15 | 14 | 5 | 50 | 32 | +18 | 44 |
| 5 | Dundee United | 34 | 17 | 9 | 8 | 61 | 49 | +12 | 43 |
| 6 | St Johnstone | 34 | 16 | 5 | 13 | 66 | 59 | +7 | 37 |
| 7 | Airdrieonians | 34 | 13 | 11 | 10 | 46 | 44 | +2 | 37 |
| 8 | Heart of Midlothian | 34 | 14 | 8 | 12 | 52 | 54 | −2 | 36 |
| 9 | Dundee | 34 | 10 | 12 | 12 | 47 | 48 | −1 | 32 |
| 10 | Morton | 34 | 12 | 8 | 14 | 58 | 68 | −10 | 32 |
| 11 | St Mirren | 34 | 11 | 10 | 13 | 40 | 54 | −14 | 32 |
| 12 | Hibernian | 34 | 12 | 7 | 15 | 60 | 59 | +1 | 31 |
| 13 | Clyde | 34 | 9 | 13 | 12 | 35 | 50 | −15 | 31 |
| 14 | Partick Thistle | 34 | 9 | 10 | 15 | 39 | 53 | −14 | 28 |
| 15 | Aberdeen | 34 | 9 | 8 | 17 | 50 | 59 | −9 | 26 |
| 16 | Raith Rovers | 34 | 8 | 5 | 21 | 45 | 67 | −22 | 21 |
| 17 | Falkirk | 34 | 5 | 8 | 21 | 33 | 69 | −36 | 18 |
| 18 | Arbroath | 34 | 5 | 6 | 23 | 41 | 82 | −41 | 16 |

Source: "1968-1969 First Division - SPFL Archive". SPFL.

Champions: Celtic
Relegated: Falkirk, Arbroath

== Scottish League Division Two ==
| Pos | Team | Pld | W | D | L | GF | GA | GD | Pts | Promotion or relegation |
|---|---|---|---|---|---|---|---|---|---|---|
| 1 | Motherwell | 36 | 30 | 4 | 2 | 112 | 23 | +89 | 64 | Promotion to the 1969–70 First Division |
| 2 | Ayr United | 36 | 23 | 7 | 6 | 82 | 31 | +51 | 53 | Promotion to the 1969–70 First Division |
| 3 | East Fife | 36 | 21 | 6 | 9 | 82 | 45 | +37 | 48 | |
| 4 | Stirling Albion | 36 | 21 | 6 | 9 | 67 | 40 | +27 | 48 | |
| 5 | Queen of the South | 36 | 20 | 7 | 9 | 75 | 41 | +34 | 47 | |
| 6 | Forfar Athletic | 36 | 18 | 7 | 11 | 71 | 56 | +15 | 43 | |
| 7 | Albion Rovers | 36 | 19 | 5 | 12 | 60 | 56 | +4 | 43 | |
| 8 | Stranraer | 36 | 17 | 7 | 12 | 57 | 45 | +12 | 41 | |
| 9 | East Stirlingshire | 36 | 17 | 5 | 14 | 70 | 62 | +8 | 39 | |
| 10 | Montrose | 36 | 15 | 4 | 17 | 59 | 71 | −12 | 34 | |
| 11 | Queen's Park | 36 | 13 | 7 | 16 | 50 | 59 | −9 | 33 | |
| 12 | Cowdenbeath | 36 | 12 | 5 | 19 | 54 | 67 | −13 | 29 | |
| 13 | Clydebank | 36 | 6 | 15 | 15 | 52 | 67 | −15 | 27 | |
| 14 | Dumbarton | 36 | 11 | 5 | 20 | 46 | 69 | −23 | 27 | |
| 15 | Hamilton Academical | 36 | 8 | 8 | 20 | 37 | 72 | −35 | 24 | |
| 16 | Berwick Rangers | 36 | 7 | 9 | 20 | 42 | 70 | −28 | 23 | |
| 17 | Brechin City | 36 | 8 | 6 | 22 | 40 | 78 | −38 | 22 | |
| 18 | Alloa Athletic | 36 | 7 | 7 | 22 | 45 | 79 | −34 | 21 | |
| 19 | Stenhousemuir | 36 | 6 | 6 | 24 | 55 | 125 | −70 | 18 | |

Source: "1968-1969 Second Division - SPFL Archive". SPFL.

Promoted: Motherwell, Ayr United

== Cup honours ==
| Competition | Winner | Score | Runner-up |
|---|---|---|---|
| Scottish Cup 1968–69 | Celtic | 4 – 0 | Rangers |
| League Cup 1968–69 | Celtic | 6 – 2 | Hibernian |
| Junior Cup | Cambuslang Rangers | 1 – 0 | Kirkintilloch Rob Roy |

== Individual honours ==
| Award | Winner | Club |
|---|---|---|
| Footballer of the Year | (Scotland) Bobby Murdoch | Celtic |

== Other honours ==
=== National ===
| Competition | Winner | Score | Runner-up |
|---|---|---|---|
| Scottish Qualifying Cup – North | Inverness Caledonian | 5 – 2 * | Ross County |
| Scottish Qualifying Cup – South | Tarff Rovers | 4 – 3 * | St Cuthbert Wanderers |

=== County ===
| Competition | Winner | Score | Runner-up |
|---|---|---|---|
| Aberdeenshire Cup | Peterhead | | |
| Ayrshire Cup | Ayr United | | Kilmarnock |
| East of Scotland Shield | Hearts | 2 – 1 | Hibernian |
| Fife Cup | Raith Rovers | 4 – 1 * | East Fife |
| Forfarshire Cup | Dundee United | 2 – 0 | Arbroath |
| Glasgow Cup | Rangers | 3 – 2 | Partick Thistle |
| Lanarkshire Cup | Motherwell | 2 – 1 † | Airdrie |
| Stirlingshire Cup | East Stirling | 3 – 2 | Alloa Athletic |

^{*} – aggregate over two legs
† – play off

=== Highland League ===
Top Three
| Pos | Team | Pld | W | D | L | GF | GA | GD | Pts |
|---|---|---|---|---|---|---|---|---|---|
| 1 | Elgin City | 30 | 24 | 4 | 2 | 100 | 32 | +68 | 52 |
| 2 | Inverness Thistle | 30 | 20 | 3 | 7 | 106 | 53 | +53 | 43 |
| 3 | Ross County | 30 | 17 | 9 | 4 | 83 | 46 | +37 | 43 |

== Scotland national team ==
| Date | Venue | Opponents | Score | Competition | Scotland scorer(s) |
|---|---|---|---|---|---|
| 16 October 1968 | Idraetsparken, Copenhagen (A) | Denmark | 1–0 | Friendly | Bobby Lennox |
| 6 November 1968 | Hampden Park, Glasgow (H) | Austria | 2–1 | WCQG7 | Denis Law, Billy Bremner |
| 11 December 1968 | Palaio GSP Stadium, Nicosia (A) | Cyprus | 5–0 | WCQG7 | Colin Stein (2), Alan Gilzean (2), Bobby Murdoch |
| 16 April 1969 | Hampden Park, Glasgow (H) | West Germany | 1–1 | WCQG7 | Bobby Murdoch |
| 3 May 1969 | The Racecourse Ground, Wrexham (A) | Wales | 5–3 | BHC | Billy McNeill, Colin Stein, Alan Gilzean, Billy Bremner, Tommy McLean |
| 6 May 1969 | Hampden Park, Glasgow (H) | Northern Ireland | 1–1 | BHC | Colin Stein |
| 10 May 1969 | Wembley Stadium, London (A) | England | 1–4 | BHC | Colin Stein |
| 17 May 1969 | Hampden Park, Glasgow (H) | Cyprus | 8–0 | WCQG7 | Colin Stein (4), Billy McNeill, Willie Henderson, Tommy Gemmell (pen.), Eddie Gray |

Key:

- (H) = Home match
- (A) = Away match
- WCQG7 = World Cup qualifying – Group 7
- BHC = British Home Championship
