= 1970 FIFA World Cup qualification (CONMEBOL) =

Tournament details
- Dates: 6 July – 31 August 1969
- Teams: 10 (from 1 confederation)

Tournament statistics
- Matches played: 24
- Goals scored: 65 (2.71 per match)
- Top scorer: (Brazil) Tostão (10 goals)

Listed below are the dates and results for the 1970 FIFA World Cup qualification rounds for the South American Zone (CONMEBOL). For an overview of the qualification rounds, see the article 1970 FIFA World Cup qualification.

The 10 teams were divided into 2 groups of 3 teams each and 1 group of 4 teams. 3 spots were open for competition. The teams would play against each other on a home-and-away basis.

== Groups ==
=== Group 1 ===
Rank	Team	Pts	Pld	W	D	L	GF	GA	GD
1	Peru	5	4	2	1	1	7	4	+3
2	Bolivia	4	4	2	0	2	5	6	−1
3	Argentina	3	4	1	1	2	4	6	−2

27 July 1969

Bolivia	3–1	Argentina
Díaz 18'; Blacut 51' (pen.); Álvarez 70'		Tarabini 43'

Estadio Hernando Siles, La Paz, Bolivia
Attendance: 21,267
Referee: Sosa Miranda (Paraguay)

3 August 1969

Peru	1–0	Argentina
León 52'

Estadio Nacional, Lima, Peru
Attendance: 43,147
Referee: De Moraes (Brazil)

10 August 1969

Bolivia	2–1 (Note: The Bolivia v Peru match on 10 August 1969 is infamous for being fixed by Argentina in favour of Bolivia. Match referee Sergio Chechelev annulled a valid goal from Peru without any justification, allowing Bolivia to win 2–1. Years later, Chechelev excused himself saying that Argentina had paid him to favour Bolivia.)	Peru
Díaz 69'; Chumpitaz 80' (o.g.)		Chale 51'

Estadio Hernando Siles, La Paz, Bolivia
Attendance: 20,670
Referee: Chechelev (Venezuela)

17 August 1969

Peru	3–0	Bolivia
Cubillas 36'; Cruzado 40'; Gallardo 58'

Estadio Nacional, Lima, Peru
Attendance: 43,148
Referee: Ramirez (Colombia)

24 August 1969

Argentina	1–0	Bolivia
Albrecht 62' (pen.)

La Bombonera, Buenos Aires, Argentina
Attendance: 47,069
Referee: Pena Rocha (Uruguay)

31 August 1969

Argentina	2–2	Peru
Albrecht 80' (pen.); Rendo 90'		Ramírez 64', 81'

La Bombonera, Buenos Aires, Argentina
Attendance: 53,627
Referee: Diaz (Chile)

Peru qualified. This has been the only time that Argentina failed to qualify to a World Cup tournament.

=== Group 2 ===
Rank	Team	Pts	Pld	W	D	L	GF	GA	GD
1	Brazil	12	6	6	0	0	23	2	+21
2	Paraguay	8	6	4	0	2	6	5	+1
3	Colombia	3	6	1	1	4	7	12	−5
4	Venezuela	1	6	0	1	5	1	18	−17

27 July 1969

Colombia	3–0	Venezuela
González 34', 56'; Segrera 76' (pen.)

Estadio El Campín, Bogotá, Colombia
Referee: Murgueytio (Ecuador)

2 August 1969

Venezuela	1–1	Colombia
Mendoza 55'		Tamayo 61'

Estadio Olímpico Universitario, Caracas, Venezuela
Referee: Ortube Vargas (Bolivia)

6 August 1969

Colombia	0–2	Brazil
		Tostão 37', 44'

Estadio El Campín, Bogotá, Colombia
Referee: Tejada Burga (Peru)

6 August 1969

Venezuela	0–2	Paraguay
		Rojas 38'; Sosa 53'

Estadio Olímpico Universitario, Caracas, Venezuela
Referee: Palacio (Chile)

10 August 1969

Colombia	0–1	Paraguay
		Martínez 57'

Estadio El Campín, Bogotá, Colombia
Referee: Pedraza (Peru)

10 August 1969

Venezuela	0–5	Brazil
		Tostão 60', 72', 77'; Pelé 71', 79'

Estadio Olímpico Universitario, Caracas, Venezuela
Referee: Villacis (Ecuador)

17 August 1969

Paraguay	0–3	Brazil
		Mendoza 70' (o.g.); Jairzinho 81'; Edu 90'

Estadio de Puerto Sajonia, Asunción, Paraguay
Referee: Conley (Chile)

21 August 1969

Brazil	6–2	Colombia
Tostão 15', 40'; Edu 48'; Pelé 60'; Rivellino 86'; Jairzinho 88'		Mesa 18'; Gallego 89'

Estádio do Maracanã, Rio de Janeiro, Brazil
Attendance: 99,947
Referee: Comesana (Argentina)

21 August 1969

Paraguay	1–0	Venezuela
Jiménez 11'

Estadio de Puerto Sajonia, Asunción, Paraguay
Referee: Otero (Uruguay)

24 August 1969

Brazil	6–0	Venezuela
Tostão 3', 22', 24'; Jairzinho 30'; Pelé 45' (pen.), 69'

Estádio do Maracanã, Rio de Janeiro, Brazil
Referee: Ortube Vargas (Bolivia)

24 August 1969

Paraguay	2–1	Colombia
Arrúa 38', 49'		Segrera 83' (pen.)

Estadio de Puerto Sajonia, Ascuncion, Paraguay
Referee: Pestarino (Argentina)

31 August 1969

Brazil	1–0	Paraguay
Pelé 68'

Estádio do Maracanã, Rio de Janeiro, Brazil
Referee: Barreto Ruiz (Uruguay)

Brazil qualified.

=== Group 3 ===
Rank	Team	Pts	Pld	W	D	L	GF	GA	GD
1	Uruguay	7	4	3	1	0	5	0	+5
2	Chile	4	4	1	2	1	5	4	+1
3	Ecuador	1	4	0	1	3	2	8	−6

Source=

6 July 1969

Ecuador	0–2	Uruguay
		Bareño 31'; Zubía 60'

Estadio Modelo, Guayaquil, Ecuador
Referee: Arppi Filho (Brazil)

13 July 1969

Chile	0–0	Uruguay

Estadio Nacional, Santiago, Chile
Referee: Bossolino (Argentina)

20 July 1969

Uruguay	1–0	Ecuador
Ancheta 76'

Estadio Centenario, Montevideo, Uruguay
Referee: Osorio (Paraguay)

27 July 1969

Chile	4–1	Ecuador
Olivares 55'; Valdéz 62', 86'; Ramiro Tobar 79' (o.g.)		Macías 89'

Estadio Nacional, Santiago, Chile
Referee: Ramírez (Colombia)

3 August 1969

Ecuador	1–1	Chile
Rodríguez 14'		Olivares 61'

Estadio Modelo, Guayaquil, Ecuador
Referee: Angeles (Peru

10 August 1969

Uruguay	2–0	Chile
Cortés 44'; Rocha 90'

Estadio Centenario, Montevideo, Uruguay
Referee: Marques (Brazil)

Uruguay qualified.

== Qualified teams ==
The following three teams from CONMEBOL qualified for the final tournament.

Team	Qualified as	Qualified on	Previous appearances in FIFA World Cup^{1}
Peru	Group 1 winners	31 August 1969	1 (1930)
Brazil	Group 2 winners	31 August 1969	8 (1930, 1934, 1938, 1950, 1954, **1958**, **1962**, 1966)
Uruguay	Group 3 winners	10 August 1969	5 (**1930**, **1950**, 1954, 1962, 1966)

^{1} Bold indicates champions for that year. Italic indicates hosts for that year.

== Goalscorers ==
There were 65 goals scored in 24 matches, for an average of 2.71 goals per match.

10 goals

- (Brazil) Tostão

6 goals

- (Brazil) Pelé

3 goals

- (Brazil) Jairzinho

2 goals

- (Argentina) Rafael Albrecht
- (Bolivia) Raúl Alvarez
- (Brazil) Edu
- (Chile) Adolfo Olivares
- (Chile) Francisco Valdéz
- (Colombia) Jaime González
- (Colombia) Hermenegildo Segrera
- (Paraguay) Saturnino Arrúa
- (Peru) Oswaldo Ramírez

1 goal

- (Argentina) Alberto Rendo
- (Argentina) Aníbal Tarabini
- (Bolivia) Ramiro Blacut
- (Bolivia) Juan Américo Díaz
- (Brazil) Rivellino
- (Colombia) Jorge Ramírez Gallego
- (Colombia) Orlando Mesa
- (Colombia) Javier Tamayo
- (Ecuador) Félix Lasso
- (Ecuador) Tom Rodríguez
- (Paraguay) Lorenzo Gimenez
- (Paraguay) Aurelio Martínez
- (Paraguay) Pablo Rojas
- (Paraguay) Alcides Sosa
- (Peru) Roberto Challe
- (Peru) Luis Cruzado
- (Peru) Teófilo Cubillas
- (Peru) Alberto Gallardo
- (Peru) Pedro Pablo León
- (Uruguay) Atilio Ancheta
- (Uruguay) Rúben Bareño
- (Uruguay) Julio César Cortés
- (Uruguay) Pedro Rocha
- (Uruguay) Oscar Zubía
- (Venezuela) Luis Mendoza Benedetto

1 own goal

- (Ecuador) Ramiro Tobar (against Chile)
- (Paraguay) Valentín Mendoza (against Brazil)
- (Peru) Héctor Chumpitaz (against Bolivia)
