= Manuel Ortiz =

Manuel Ortiz or Ortíz may refer to:

- Manuel Ortiz (boxer) (1916–1970), American boxer
- Manuel Ortiz (fencer) (1948–2008), Cuban fencer
- Manuel Antonio Ortiz (fl.1840–1841), President of Paraguay
- Manuel Jesús Ortiz, Chilean football midfielder
- Manuel Rivera-Ortiz (born 1968), Puerto Rican-American documentary photographer
- Manuel Ortiz Guerrero (1897–1933), Paraguayan poet and musician
- Manuel Ortiz Partida, (born 1971), Mexican wrestler (also known under ring names Halloween and Ciclope)
- Manuel Ortiz Toribio (born 1984), Spanish footballer
- Manuel Ortíz de Zárate (1887–1946), Chilean painter
- Manuel Ortiz (pastor) (1938–2017), American pastor
