= 1968–69 British Home Championship =

Tournament details
- Dates: 3–10 May 1969
- Teams: 4

Final positions
- Champions: England (44th title)
- Runners-up: Scotland

Tournament statistics
- Matches played: 6
- Goals scored: 22 (3.67 per match)
- Top scorer(s): (England) Martin Peters (England) Geoff Hurst (Scotland) Colin Stein (Wales) Ron Davies (3 each)

The 1968–69 British Home Championship was the third edition of the tournament to be held while England were World Champions following their victory in the 1966 FIFA World Cup. The tournament was reverted to its pre–First World War format, being played at the end of the season in a short period of time, to relax the demands on the players during the competitive season. England re-emphasised their dominance over the British game with a second comfortable win in a row. The tournament began with the favourites England and Scotland securing comfortable (if dramatic) wins over their weaker opponents, before England repeated the feat in a tougher game against Wales and Scotland were held to a draw by Ireland. Going into the final game needing a win, the Scots were thoroughly beaten by a strong English team, who took the trophy in a 4–1 victory.

== Table ==
Team	Pld	W	D	L	GF	GA	GD	Pts
England (C)	3	3	0	0	9	3	+6	6
Scotland	3	1	1	1	7	8	−1	3
Ireland	3	0	2	1	2	4	−2	2
Wales	3	0	1	2	4	7	−3	1

Rules for classification: 1) points. The points system worked as follows: 2 points for a win and 1 point for a draw.
(C) Champions

== Results ==
3 May 1969

Wales	3–5	Scotland
Davies 29', 57'; Toshack 44'		McNeill 13'; Stein 16'; Gilzean 55'; Bremner 72'; McLean 87'

Racecourse Ground, Wrexham
Attendance: 18,765
Referee: Jim Finney (England)

3 May 1969

Ireland	1–3	England
McMordie 63'		Peters 39'; Lee 64'; Hurst 74' (pen.)

Windsor Park, Belfast
Attendance: 23,000
Referee: William Mullan (Scotland)

6 May 1969

Scotland	1–1	Ireland
Stein 53'		McMordie 11'

Hampden Park, Glasgow
Attendance: 7,483
Referee: David Smith (England)

7 May 1969

England	2–1	Wales
B. Charlton 58'; Lee 72'		Davies 18'

Wembley Stadium, London
Attendance: 70,000
Referee: John Adair (Northern Ireland)

10 May 1969

Ireland	0–0	Wales

Windsor Park, Belfast
Attendance: 12,500
Referee: Eric Jennings (England)

10 May 1969

England	4–1	Scotland
Peters 16', 64'; Hurst 20', 60' (pen.)		Stein 43'

Wembley Stadium, London
Attendance: 89,902
Referee: Robert Héliès (France)
