= McMordie =

McMordie is a surname. Notable people with the surname include:

- Ali McMordie (born 1959), Northern Irish bass guitarist
- Eric McMordie (born 1946), Northern Irish footballer
- Julia McMordie (1860–1942), Northern Irish politician
- R. J. McMordie (1849–1914), Irish barrister and politician
