= Bobby Stein =

Scottish footballer (1938/39–2021)

Personal information
- Date of birth: 1938 or 1939
- Date of death: 13 August 2021 (aged 82)
- Position: Right back

Senior career*
Years	Team	Apps	(Gls)
- Broxburn Athletic
1960–1969	Raith Rovers		
1969–1970	Montrose		
1971–1977	East Stirlingshire		
- * Club domestic league appearances and goals

Robert Stein (1938/9 – 13 August 2021) was a Scottish professional footballer who played for Broxburn Athletic, Raith Rovers, Montrose and East Stirlingshire as a right back.

His brother Colin was also a footballer.
