= Adolfo Olivares =

Chilean footballer (1940–2025)

Personal information
- Full name: Adolfo Alamiro Olivares Aravena
- Date of birth: 20 December 1940
- Place of birth: Ocoa, Chile
- Date of death: 23 June 2025 (aged 84)
- Height: 1.76 m (5 ft 9 in)
- Position: Striker

Youth career
- Estrella de Ocoa

Senior career*
Years	Team	Apps	(Gls)
1961	Everton	13	(7)
1962–1963	Ferrobádminton	45	(19)
1964–1966	Universidad de Chile	26	(13)
1966	Palestino	1	(0)
1967	Huachipato	33	(10)
1968–1969	Santiago Morning	60	(32)
1970–1971	Audax Italiano	25	(5)
1972	Magallanes	21	(6)
1973	Alianza		
1974–1976	The Strongest		
1977	CD Aurora		
1978	Huachipato	0	(0)
1979	Unión San Felipe		

International career
1968–1969	Chile	15	(7)
- * Club domestic league appearances and goals

Adolfo Alamiro Olivares Aravena (20 December 1940 – 23 June 2025) was a Chilean footballer who played as a striker. Besides Chile, he played in El Salvador and Bolivia.

== Club career ==
As a youth player, Olivares was with club Estrella de Ocoa. At a professional level, he mainly developed his career in the Chilean top division. He made his professional debut with Everton de Viña del Mar in 1961. After two seasons with Ferrobádminton, he joined Universidad de Chile in 1964, taking part in the well-known squad known as El Ballet Azul, staying with them for three seasons. In his homeland at the top division, he also played for Palestino, Huachipato, Santiago Morning, Audax Italiano and Magallanes.

Abroad, he played for Alianza in El Salvador and both The Strongest and Aurora in Bolivia. With The Strongest, where he coincided with his compatriot Manuel Jesús Ortiz, he won the league title in 1974 and took part in the 1975 Copa Libertadores.

His last club was Unión San Felipe in the 1979 season.

Following his retirement, he went on playing football at the amateur level in leagues such as Liga La Reina from Huechuraba and Liga Independiente de Fútbol from Santiago.

== International career ==
Olivares made fifteen appearances for the Chile national team in friendly matches and the 1970 FIFA World Cup qualifiers and scored seven goals between 1968 and 1969.

== Personal life and death ==
He was nicknamed Cuchi-Cuchi, a nickname that was given by his fellow footballer Rubén Marcos after he went out with Silvia Ferrer, known by that stage name, an Argentine star from the Bim Bam Bum theater.

After suffering and getting over lymph node cancer, he was helped by Martín Gálvez, a former player of Universidad de Chile. Adolfo died on 23 June 2025, at the age of 84.
