= Manuel Jesús Ortiz =

Chilean footballer

Personal information
- Full name: Manuel Jesús Ortiz Faúndez
- Place of birth: Chile
- Position: Left winger

Senior career*
Years	Team	Apps	(Gls)
1966–1970	Huachipato	78	(10)
1971–1972	Santiago Wanderers	61	(11)
1973–1975	The Strongest		
- Litoral
- * Club domestic league appearances and goals

Manuel Jesús Ortiz Faúndez is a Chilean former football player who played as a left winger. Ortiz also played in Bolivia for The Strongest.

== Playing career ==
A left winger, his first club was Huachipato, with whom he won the 1966 Segunda División de Chile and earned the promotion to the top division. He stayed with them in the top division until the 1970 season.

Ortiz switched to Santiago Wanderers in 1971, making his debut in a match against Unión San Felipe on 11 April. He also played for them in 1972.

In 1973 he moved to Bolivia and joined The Strongest, spending three seasons with them until 1975. In that club, he coincided with his compatriot Adolfo Olivares and won the 1974 league title. In Bolivia, Ortiz also played for Litoral from La Paz.

== Personal life ==
As a football player, he was nicknamed Chueco (Bow-legged).
