= Gary Aubert =

Canadian retired soccer player

Personal information
- Date of birth: 13 August 1952 (age 74)
- Place of birth: Winnipeg, Canada
- Position: Striker

International career
Years	Team	Apps	(Gls)
1973	Canada	1	(1)

Gary Aubert (born 13 August 1952) is a Canadian retired soccer player who earned one cap for the national team in 1973, scoring one goal in the process.

== International career ==
Aubert made his debut for Canada in an August 1973 friendly match against Poland in which he immediately scored his first international goal. He also played in the unofficial match against Malta in September 1973.
