= Tonín Mendoza =

Honduran footballer (1947–2022)

Personal information
- Full name: Marco Antonio Mendoza Abate
- Date of birth: 1947
- Place of birth: Tegucigalpa, Francisco Morazán, Honduras
- Date of death: 22 January 2022 (aged 75)
- Place of death: New Jersey, United States
- Position: Midfielder

Senior career*
Years	Team	Apps	(Gls)
1966–1978	Olimpia		(9)

International career
1967–1972	Honduras		(1)
- * Club domestic league appearances and goals

Marco Antonio Mendoza Abate (1947 – 22 January 2022) was a Honduran footballer. Nicknamed Tonín Mendoza, he played for Olimpia throughout the late 1960s and the 1970s, winning many titles with the club. He also represented Honduras for the 1967 and 1971 CONCACAF Championships.

== Club career ==
Mendoza began his career for Olimpia during the 1966–67 Honduran Liga Nacional where his inaugural season saw the club win their first ever national title with this success later being emulated in the following 1967–68 Honduran Liga Nacional. He was a part of the golden generation of the 1970s that saw him win the 1969–70 and 1970–71 Honduran Liga Nacional. He also was part of the winning squad for the 1972 CONCACAF Champions' Cup that later participated in the 1973 Copa Interamericana, serving as captain throughout this period. His final season was also a winning one, taking home the 1977–78 Honduran Liga Nacional before his retirement with 9 goals throughout his entire career.

== International career ==
Mendoza was first called up to represent Honduras for the 1967 CONCACAF Championship where the Catrachos achieved third place in the tournament. Two years later, he was part of the Honduran squad that participated in the 1970 FIFA World Cup qualifiers, notably playing in the away match against El Salvador at the Estadio Flor Blanca that would later culminate in the outbreak of the Football War. Following his participation in the 1971 CONCACAF Championship, he participated in the 1973 CONCACAF Championship qualifiers but wouldn't appear in the final squad for the tournament.

== Personal life ==
Mendoza died on 22 January 2022 in New Jersey at the age of 75 from COVID-19 complications.
