= Don Archibald =

Canadian soccer player

Personal information
- Date of birth: 19 September 1906
- Place of birth: Truro, Canada
- Date of death: 10 May 1968 (aged 61)
- Position: Forward

International career
| Years | Team | Apps | (Gls) |
| 1927 | Canada | 4 | (3) |

Don Archibald (19 September 1906 – 10 May 1968) was a Canadian soccer player who earned four caps for the national team in 1927, scoring three goals in the process.
