= Gordon Stewart (soccer) =

South African soccer player

Personal information
- Full name: James Gordon Stewart
- Date of birth: 7 August 1927
- Place of birth: Cape Town, South Africa
- Date of death: December 1980 (aged 53)
- Place of death: Natal, South Africa
- Height: 1.70 m (5 ft 7 in)
- Position: Inside forward

Senior career*
Years	Team	Apps	(Gls)
- Parkhill
1951–1953	Leeds United	9	(2)

International career
- South Africa
- * Club domestic league appearances and goals

James Gordon Stewart (7 August 1927 — December 1980) was a South African footballer who played as an inside forward.

== Career ==
In October 1951, Stewart travelled to England to sign for Leeds United from South African club Parkhill, after impressing for South Africa during a Wolverhampton Wanderers tour of the country. In just over a year at the club, Stewart made 11 first team appearances during his time at Leeds, scoring twice. In 1953, Stewart returned to his native South Africa.
