= Tibor Vigh =

Hungarian-born Canadian soccer player

Personal information
- Date of birth: 21 December 1941 (age 84)
- Place of birth: Budapest, Hungary
- Position: Forward

Senior career*
Years	Team	Apps	(Gls)
1957–1959	Windsor Hungaria		
1960	Windsor Teutonia		
1961	Ravanica		
1962–1964	Windsor Teutonia		
1965	Detroit Kickers		
1965–1966	Windsor Teutonia		
1966–1967	New York Hungaria		
1968	Houston Stars	28	(12)
1968	Greek American AA		
1969	Rochester Lancers		
1969–1970	Laguna		
1970–1971	Torreón		
1973	New York Cosmos	6	(0)
1973	Montreal Olympique	10	(0)
1974	Greek American AA		
1974	New York Apollo		

International career
1968	Canada	4	(2)
- * Club domestic league appearances and goals

Tibor Vigh is a Hungarian-born Canadian former soccer player who earned 4 caps for the Canadian national side in 1968, scoring 2 goals.

== Career ==
Vigh played at youth level with Ferencvárosi, but was forced to flee Hungary in 1956 as result of the failure of the Hungarian Revolution. He initially landed in Belgium before permanently settling in Windsor, Canada along with the rest of his family. Once settled in Canada he immediately played at the local regional league the Essex County Soccer League with Windsor Hungaria in 1957. In 1960, he signed with league rivals Windsor Teutonia. The following season he played in the Michigan-Ontario Soccer League with Ravanica.

He returned to play with Windsor Teutonia as Teutonia joined the Michigan-Ontario Soccer League in 1962. He assisted in securing a league double for Windsor in 1962, and finished as the leagues top goal scorer. In early 1965, he played with Detroit Kickers, and the remainder of the season he played in the National Soccer League as Windsor became a league member. In his debut season in the NSL he recorded 27 goals in 13 matches.

After the conclusion of the NSL season he played in the German-American Soccer League with New York Hungaria. He re-signed with Windsor for the 1966 season, and assisted in securing the NSL Championship against Toronto Croatia. He returned to play with New York Hungaria for the 1966–67 season, and was named to the all-star team. In 1968, he played abroad in the North American Soccer League with Houston Stars where he served as the team captain. He continued playing in the German-American League with Greek American AA, and assisted in securing the 1969 National Challenge Cup.

After the folding of Houston in 1969 he played with Rochester Lancers in the American Soccer League. In late 1969, he played in the Primera División de México for Club de Fútbol Laguna and later with Club de Fútbol Torreón. After three seasons in Mexico he returned to the NASL to sign with the New York Cosmos. Midway through the 1973 season he was traded to Montreal Olympique. In early 1974, he returned to play with Greek American, and assisted in winning his second National Challenge Cup.

In late 1974, he returned to the ASL to sign with New York Apollo, and assisted New York in reaching the ASL Championship final. In 1977, he was named to the Rochester Lancers Team of the Decade.

== International career ==
He made his debut for the Canada men's national soccer team on 6 October 1968 against Bermuda in a World Cup qualifier match.

=== International goals ===
Scores and results list Canada's goal tally first.

#	Date	Venue	Opponent	Score	Result	Competition
1	6 October 1968	Varsity Stadium, Toronto, Canada	Bermuda	1–0	4–0	1970 FIFA World Cup qualification
2	17 October 1968	Varsity Stadium, Toronto, Canada	United States	4–1	4–2	1970 FIFA World Cup qualification

== Personal life ==
His brother Zoltan Vigh was also a footballer who played as a goalkeeper.
