= Rúben Bareño =

Uruguayan footballer (born 1944)

Ruben Bareño
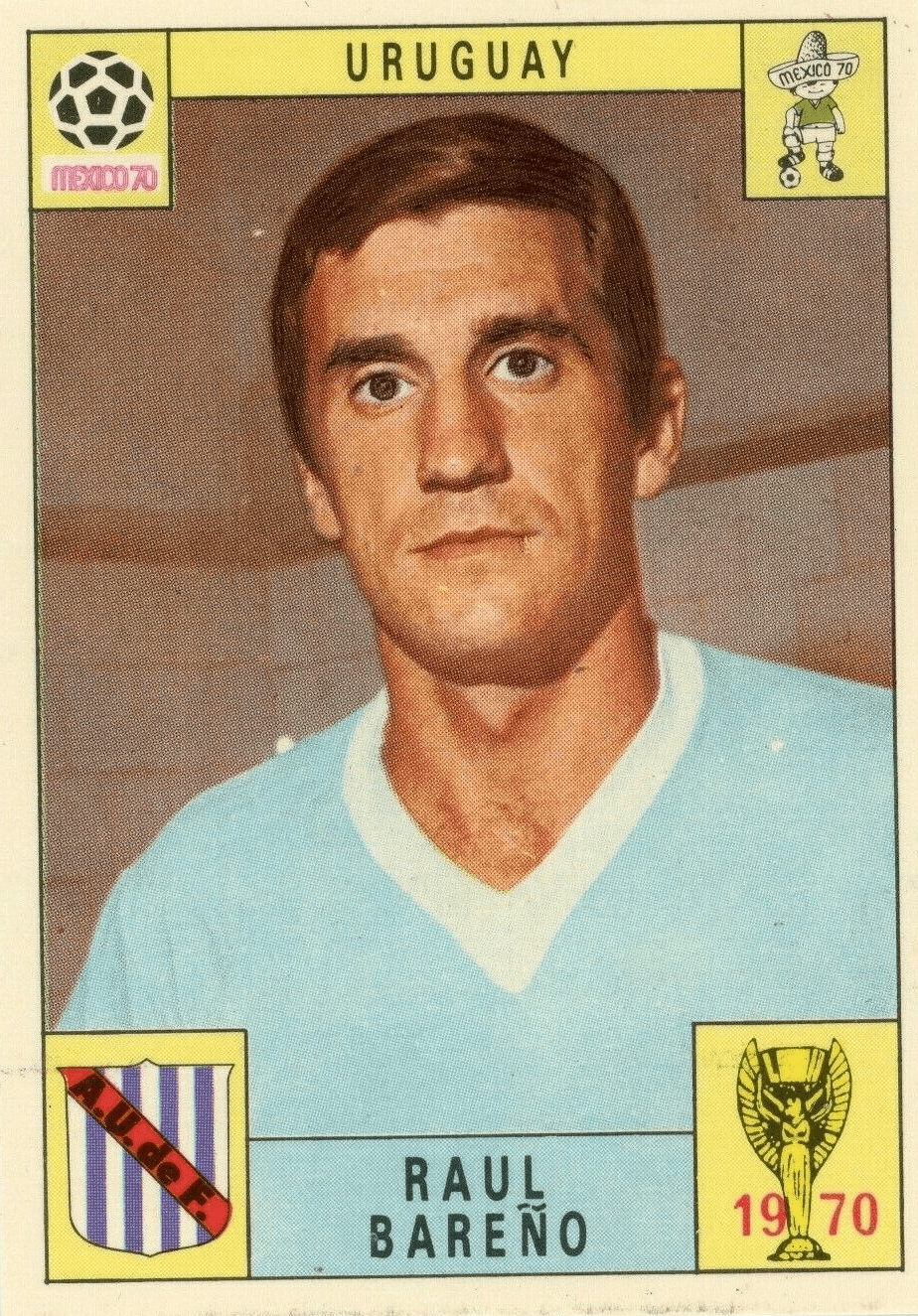
- Bareño in the 1970 FIFA World Cup

Personal information
- Full name: Ruben Laudelino Bareño Silva
- Date of birth: 23 January 1944 (age 82)
- Place of birth: Uruguay
- Height: 1.74 m (5 ft 9 in)
- Position: Forward

Senior career*
Years	Team	Apps	(Gls)
- C.A. Cerro
1970-1971	Nacional		
1974	Racing Club de Avellaneda	20	(3)

International career
1967–1970	Uruguay	13	(3)
- * Club domestic league appearances and goals

Ruben Laudelino Bareño Silva (born 23 January 1944) is a Uruguayan football forward who played for Uruguay in the 1970 FIFA World Cup. He also played for C.A. Cerro. In Argentina, he played for Racing.

== Honours ==
Nacional

- Uruguayan Primera División: 1970, 1971
- Copa Libertadores: 1971
