= Colin Stein =

Scottish footballer (born 1947)

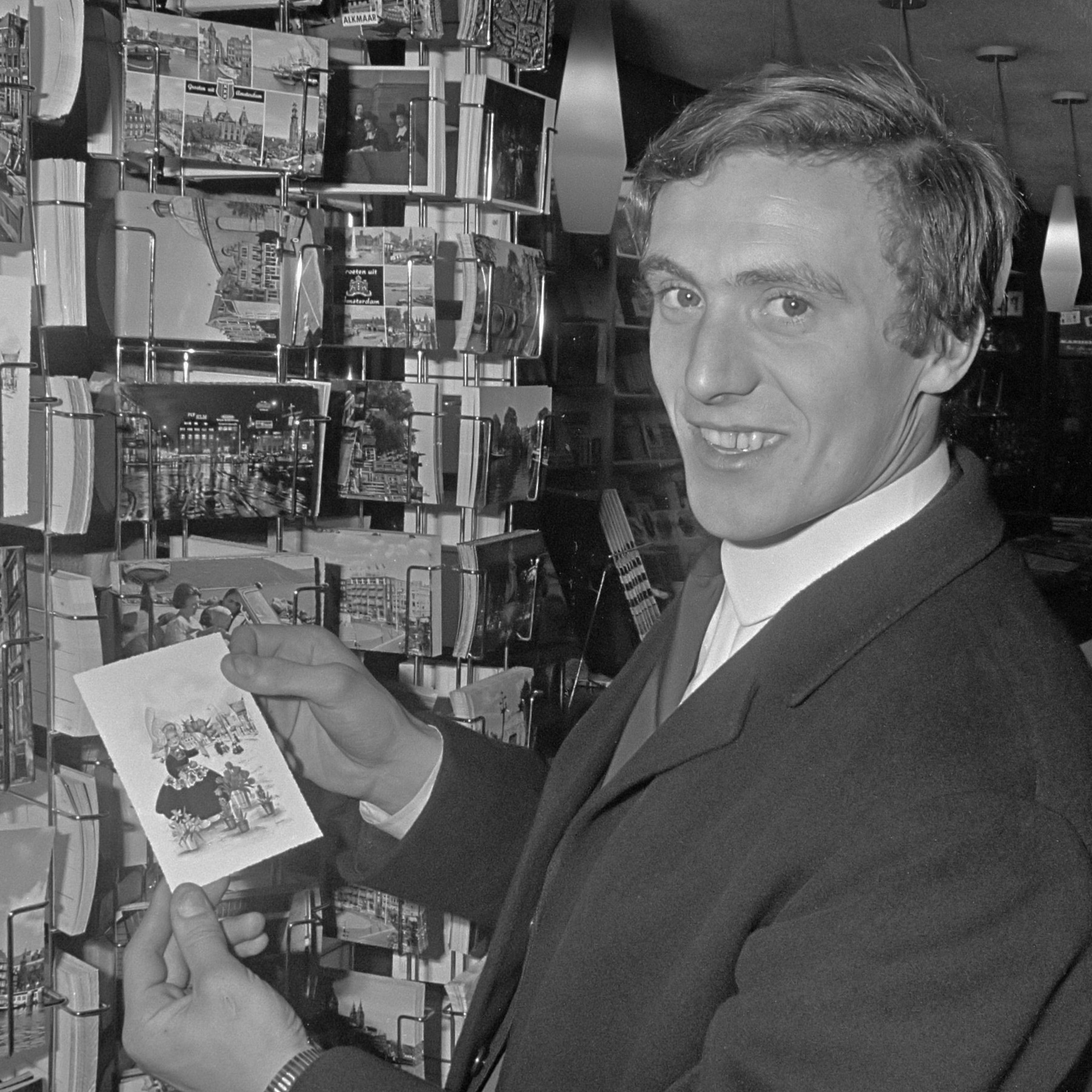
- Stein in 1969.

Personal information
- Full name: Colin Anderson Stein
- Date of birth: 10 May 1947 (age 79)
- Place of birth: Linlithgow, Scotland
- Position: Forward

Youth career
- Armadale Thistle

Senior career*
Years	Team	Apps	(Gls)
1965–1968	Hibernian	74	(41)
1968–1972	Rangers	112	(60)
1972–1975	Coventry City	83	(22)
1975–1978	Rangers	16	(4)
1977–1978	→ Kilmarnock (loan)	24	(8)
Total		309	(135)

International career
1968–1973	Scotland	21	(9)
1968–1972	Scottish League XI	3	(1)
- * Club domestic league appearances and goals

Colin Anderson Stein (born 10 May 1947) is a Scottish former footballer, who played for Hibernian, Rangers (two spells), Coventry City and Kilmarnock. Stein was part of the Rangers team that won the 1971–72 UEFA Cup Winners' Cup, and he scored one of the goals in a 3–2 victory against Dinamo Moscow in the final. Stein also represented Scotland and the Scottish League XI. He scored nine goals in 21 appearances for Scotland, including four goals in a 1970 FIFA World Cup qualification match against Cyprus.

== Early life ==
Stein was born in Linlithgow and attended Linlithgow Academy before working as an apprentice joiner.

== Career ==
Stein began his career with Armadale Thistle. He went on to play professionally for Hibernian, Rangers and the Scotland national team during the 1960s and 1970s. He also had a spell in England with Coventry City. He played an important part in Rangers winning the 1972 UEFA Cup Winners' Cup Final, scoring the opening goal in the final. Rangers beat Stade Rennais, Sporting CP, Torino, Bayern Munich and Dinamo Moscow to win the competition.

On 2 January 1971, during an Old Firm match at Ibrox, Stein scored an equaliser in stoppage time to salvage a draw for Rangers after Celtic had taken the lead in the 89th minute. Minutes later after full-time, barriers on Stairway 13 at Ibrox gave way, causing a chain-reaction pileup of spectators that killed 66 and injured over 200 in what would be remembered as the second Ibrox disaster. Initial reports speculated that Rangers supporters who had left the ground turned back upon hearing the crowd roar at Stein's goal, leading to the disaster. The official inquiry into the tragedy conclusively proved that all the spectators were moving in the same direction at the time of the collapse, however.

Stein registered a hat-trick for Scotland in 1969, when he scored four goals in a match against Cyprus. He held the distinction of being the last player to score a hat-trick for Scotland until 2015, when Steven Fletcher scored three times against Gibraltar. Stein won a total of 21 caps for Scotland, scoring nine goals.

In the twilight of his career, after leaving Kilmarnock, Stein also played for Elgin City, who were then a Highland League side.

== Personal life ==
His elder brother, Bobby Stein, was also a professional footballer. He married Linda Smith in 1969 and has a son and a daughter.

== Career statistics ==
=== International appearances ===
Appearances and goals by national team and year
National team	Year	Apps	Goals
Scotland	1968	2	1
Scotland	1969	7	8
Scotland	1970	4	0
Scotland	1971	3	0
Scotland	1972	1	0
Scotland	1973	4	0
Total		21	9

=== International goals ===
Scores and results list Scotland's goal tally first

No.	Date	Venue	Opponent	Score	Result	Competition	Ref
1.	11 December 1968	GSP Stadium, Nicosia	Cyprus	5–0	5–0	1970 FIFA World Cup qualification	(Note: Some sources, including RSSSF, credit Stein with scoring two goals in the game played against Cyprus on 11 December 1968. The Scottish FA only credit Stein with one goal, scored in the 43rd minute, and credit the goal scored in the 42nd minute to Bobby Murdoch.)
2.	3 May 1969	Racecourse Ground, Wrexham	Wales	2–0	5–3	1969–70 British Home Championship	
3.	6 May 1969	Hampden Park, Glasgow	Northern Ireland	1–1	1–1	1969–70 British Home Championship	
4.	10 May 1969	Wembley Stadium, London	England	1–2	1–4	1969–70 British Home Championship	
5.	17 May 1969	Hampden Park, Glasgow	Cyprus	3–0	8–0	1970 FIFA World Cup qualification	
6.	17 May 1969	Hampden Park, Glasgow	Cyprus	4–0	8–0	1970 FIFA World Cup qualification	
7.	17 May 1969	Hampden Park, Glasgow	Cyprus	5–0	8–0	1970 FIFA World Cup qualification	
8.	17 May 1969	Hampden Park, Glasgow	Cyprus	6–0	8–0	1970 FIFA World Cup qualification	
9.	21 September 1969	Dalymount Park, Dublin	Republic of Ireland	1–0	1–1	Friendly match	

== See also ==
- List of Scotland national football team hat-tricks
