= Claude Barthélemy (footballer) =

Haitian footballer (1945–2020)

Personal information
- Date of birth: 9 May 1945
- Place of birth: Cap-Haïtien, Haiti
- Date of death: 6 April 2020 (aged 74)
- Place of death: New Jersey
- Height: 1.68 m (5 ft 6 in)
- Position: Striker

Senior career*
Years	Team	Apps	(Gls)
1961–1964	AS Capoise		
1965–1974	Club Haitien		
1968	→ Detroit Cougars (loan)	3	(0)

International career
1967–1976	Haiti	15	(4)
- * Club domestic league appearances and goals

Claude Barthélemy (9 May 1945 – 6 April 2020) was a Haitian footballer who played at both professional and international levels as a striker. He played for AS Capoise between 1961 and 1964, then joined Racing Club Haitien until 1974, and played one season for the Detroit Cougars in 1968. He played for the national team between 1967 and 1976, including two games at the 1974 FIFA World Cup.

Barthélemy died in 2020 in New Jersey.

== Career ==
=== Professional ===
Barthélemy spent time in the North American Soccer League with the Detroit Cougars.

=== International ===
Barthélemy also represented the Haitian national team at the international level, and participated in the 1974 FIFA World Cup as well as 1970 and 1974 World Cup qualifying.
