= Juan Américo Díaz =

Bolivian footballer (1944-2013)

Personal information
- Date of birth: 12 November 1944
- Date of death: 29 May 2013 (aged 68)
- Position: Forward

International career
Years	Team	Apps	(Gls)
1975	Bolivia	4	(0)

Juan Américo Díaz (12 November 1944 – 29 May 2013) was a Bolivian footballer. He played in four matches for the Bolivia national football team in 1975. He was also part of Bolivia's squad for the 1975 Copa América tournament.
