= Norman Patterson (soccer) =

Canadian soccer player

Personal information
- Full name: Norman Thomas Patterson
- Date of birth: 27 October 1945
- Place of birth: Belfast, Northern Ireland
- Date of death: 21 August 2012 (aged 66)
- Place of death: Toronto, Canada
- Height: 1.73 m (5 ft 8 in)
- Position: Centre forward

College career
Years	Team	Apps	(Gls)
- Concordia University

Senior career*
Years	Team	Apps	(Gls)
- St. Paul Rovers
- Celtic Verdun

International career
1968	Canada	3	(1)
- * Club domestic league appearances and goals

Norman Thomas Patterson (27 October 1945 – 21 August 2012) was a Canadian international soccer player.

Born in Belfast, Northern Ireland, Patterson grew up in Quebec and played club soccer for St. Paul Rovers and Celtic Verdun. He represented Canada at the 1967 Pan American Games. He died from cancer in Toronto.
