= Tyrone de la Bastide =

Trinidad and Tobago footballer

Personal information
- Full name: Tyrone Carl de la Bastide
- Date of birth: 18 October 1938
- Place of birth: Diego Martin, Trinidad and Tobago
- Date of death: 23 March 2008 (aged 69)
- Height: 1.64 m (5 ft 5 in)
- Position: Defender

Senior career*
Years	Team	Apps	(Gls)
1958–1960	Dynamos FC		
1961–1971	Maple		

International career
1959–1969	Trinidad and Tobago	17	(0)
- * Club domestic league appearances and goals

Tyrone de la Bastide (18 October 1938 – 23 March 2008) was a Trinidad and Tobago footballer.
