= David Stokes (Guatemalan footballer) =

Guatemalan footballer (1946–2025)

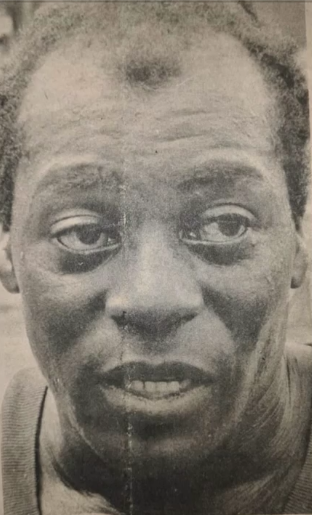

Personal information
- Full name: David Stokes Brown
- Date of birth: 4 January 1946
- Place of birth: Izabal, Guatemala
- Date of death: 16 December 2025 (aged 79)
- Height: 1.73 m (5 ft 8 in)

Senior career*
| Years | Team | Apps | (Gls) |
| 1961–1965 | Comunicaciones | | (17) |
| 1965–1969 | C.D. Oro | | |

International career
- Guatemala
- * Club domestic league appearances and goals

David Stokes Brown (4 January 1946 – 16 December 2025) was a Guatemalan footballer. He competed in the men's tournament at the 1968 Summer Olympics, and is known for scoring the first Olympic goal for Guatemala in a 1–0 win against Czechoslovakia.

Stokes had his professional debut on 20 January 1961, at the age of 15. On his debut, he played against Universidad scoring two goals in a 2–0 win. He followed his debut in a clasico against Municipal where Cremas won 2–0 with David scoring both goals.

Stokes died on 16 December 2025, at the age of 79.
