= Guy François (footballer) =

Haitian footballer (1947–2019)

Personal information
- Date of birth: 18 September 1947
- Place of birth: Haiti
- Date of death: 3 June 2019 (aged 71)
- Place of death: Montreal, Canada
- Position: Midfielder

Senior career*
Years	Team	Apps	(Gls)
- Violette A.C.

International career
- Haiti
- * Club domestic league appearances and goals

Guy François (18 September 1947 – 3 June 2019) was a Haitian football midfielder who played for Haiti in the 1974 FIFA World Cup. He also played for Violette A.C.
