= Dietrich Albrecht =

American soccer player (born 1940)

Personal information
- Full name: Dietrich Albrecht
- Date of birth: 4 February 1940 (age 86)
- Place of birth: Danzig, Nazi Germany

Senior career*
Years	Team	Apps	(Gls)
1965	New Yorkers		
1967	Philadelphia Spartans	17	(5)
1968	Cleveland Stokers	31	(6)
1969	Baltimore Bays	0	(0)
1970–1971	SK Sturm Graz	14	(2)

International career
1968–1969	United States	9	(2)
- * Club domestic league appearances and goals

Dietrich Albrecht is an American retired soccer player. He spent one season in the National Professional Soccer League and two in the North American Soccer League. He also earned nine caps, scoring three goals, with the United States national team in 1968 and 1969.

== Professional career ==
In 1965, Albrecht spent a single season with the New Yorkers of the International Soccer League. At the time, he was playing in the German American Soccer League. In 1967, he signed with the Philadelphia Spartans of the National Professional Soccer League (NPSL). In December 1967, the NPSL merged with the United Soccer Association to form the North American Soccer League (NASL). The Spartans folded during the off-season, but the Cleveland Stokers of NASL signed many of the Spartans players. In 1969, he moved to the Baltimore Bays where he played one more season in the NASL. From 1970 to 1971 Albrecht played for Austrian side SK Sturm Graz, where he made 14 appearances (2 goals).

== National team ==
Albrecht played nine times with the U.S. national team in 1968 and 1969. His first caps came in a 4–0 loss to Israel on September 25, 1968. He scored two goals a month later in a 6–3 victory over Haiti. His third goal with the national team came a week later he scored in a 1–0 victory over Canada in a World Cup qualification game. His last game with the national team came in a May 11, 1969, in a World Cup qualifying loss to Haiti which put the U.S. out of the 1970 FIFA World Cup.
