= Ralph McPate =

Canadian soccer player

Personal information
- Date of birth: 10 October 1940 (age 86)
- Place of birth: Airdrie, Scotland
- Height: 1.73 m (5 ft 8 in)
- Position: Winger

Senior career*
Years	Team	Apps	(Gls)
	Airdrieonians	0	(0)
	Third Lanark	0	(0)
1968	Toronto Emerald		
1969	Toronto Italia		
1969	Rochester Lancers		

International career
1967	Canada Olympic	5	(2)
1968	Canada	4	(2)
- * Club domestic league appearances and goals

Ralph McPate (born 10 October 1940) is a former soccer player who played as a winger. Born in Scotland, he represented Canada at international level.

== Club career ==
Born in Airdrie, Scotland, McPate began his career playing with Airdrieonians and Third Lanark, but failed to play in the League for either team.

He moved to Canada at the age of 19, combining his playing career with a job in a surveyor's practice. He played locally in Toronto, for the Ontario team, and in inter-provincial competitions. In 1968, he played in the Toronto and District Soccer League with Toronto Emerald.

In 1969 he played in the National Soccer League with Toronto Italia. That same season he also played for the Rochester Lancers in the American Soccer League.

== International career ==
He gained Canadian citizenship, and earned 4 caps for the national team in 1968, scoring 2 goals. He also represented Canada at the 1967 Pan American Games.

== Later life ==
McPate returned to Scotland in the early 2000s, living in Edinburgh.
