= Eric McMordie =

Northern Irish footballer (born 1946)

Personal information
- Full name: Alexander S. McMordie
- Date of birth: 12 August 1946 (age 80)
- Place of birth: Belfast, Northern Ireland
- Height: 5 ft 8 in (1.73 m)
- Positions: Midfielder; forward

Youth career
- –1964: Dundela

Senior career*
Years	Team	Apps	(Gls)
1964–1975	Middlesbrough	241	(22)
1974	→ Sheffield Wednesday (loan)	9	(6)
1975–1976	York City	42	(2)
1976–1978	Hartlepool United	47	(2)
Total		339	(32)

International career
1967	Northern Ireland U23	1	(0)
1968–1972	Northern Ireland	21	(3)
- * Club domestic league appearances and goals

Alexander S. McMordie (born 12 August 1946), known as Eric McMordie, is a Northern Irish former professional footballer. An attacking midfielder or inside forward, his career lasted from 1965 to 1978. He played for Middlesbrough, York City and Hartlepool United making a total of 339 league appearances, scoring 32 goals. He also represented the Northern Ireland national team on 21 occasions.

== Career ==
=== Early days ===
McMordie was born in Belfast, Northern Ireland. He was spotted by Manchester United playing as a junior in Belfast and was invited for a two-week trial at Old Trafford in July 1961. He travelled to Manchester with George Best, however, both players became homesick and soon returned to Belfast, Best was soon persuaded to return while McMordie stayed at home. On leaving school he worked as a plasterer and played football for the east Belfast part-time side Dundela F.C.

=== Middlesbrough ===
After showing good form for Dundela, McMordie was signed by Middlesbrough in September 1964 as an eighteen-year-old. He made his debut in September 1965 against Plymouth Argyle and scored his first goal against Rotherham United two weeks later. McMordie was a first team regular at Boro for eight seasons, playing 241 games and scoring 22 goals. During his time with Middlesbrough, McMordie represented Northern Ireland on 21 occasions between 1968 and 1972, scoring three goals.

The team narrowly missed out on promotion to the top flight on several occasions. The arrival of Graeme Souness for the 1972–73 season severely restricted McMordie's first team appearances, Middlesbrough won promotion to Division one in 1973–74, however McMordie was not a member of the side, with new manager Jack Charlton preferring Souness, Bobby Murdoch and David Armstrong in midfield.

During the following 1974–75 season McMordie was loaned out to Second Division Sheffield Wednesday for two months (mid October to mid December). During his time at Sheffield he played nine games and scored six goals in a struggling Wednesday side who were relegated to Division Three at the end of the season. Those six goals made McMordie Wednesday's top scorer that season and included two goals in a 3-3 away draw with Notts County, a match made memorable by County's Ian Scanlon scoring a hat-trick in 165 seconds. At the end of the loan spell, McMordie could not agree terms for a full transfer to Wednesday and returned to Middlesbrough.

=== York City, Hartlepool United ===
McMordie signed for York City for the 1975–76 season, the team were relegated to Division Three in his first season and he was sold midway through his second season after making 42 league appearances and scoring two goals. He signed for Hartlepool United in December 1976, making 47 league appearances before deciding to retire early in the 1978–79 season, shortly after his 32nd birthday.
