= Sufian Anuar =

Singaporean footballer (born 1987)

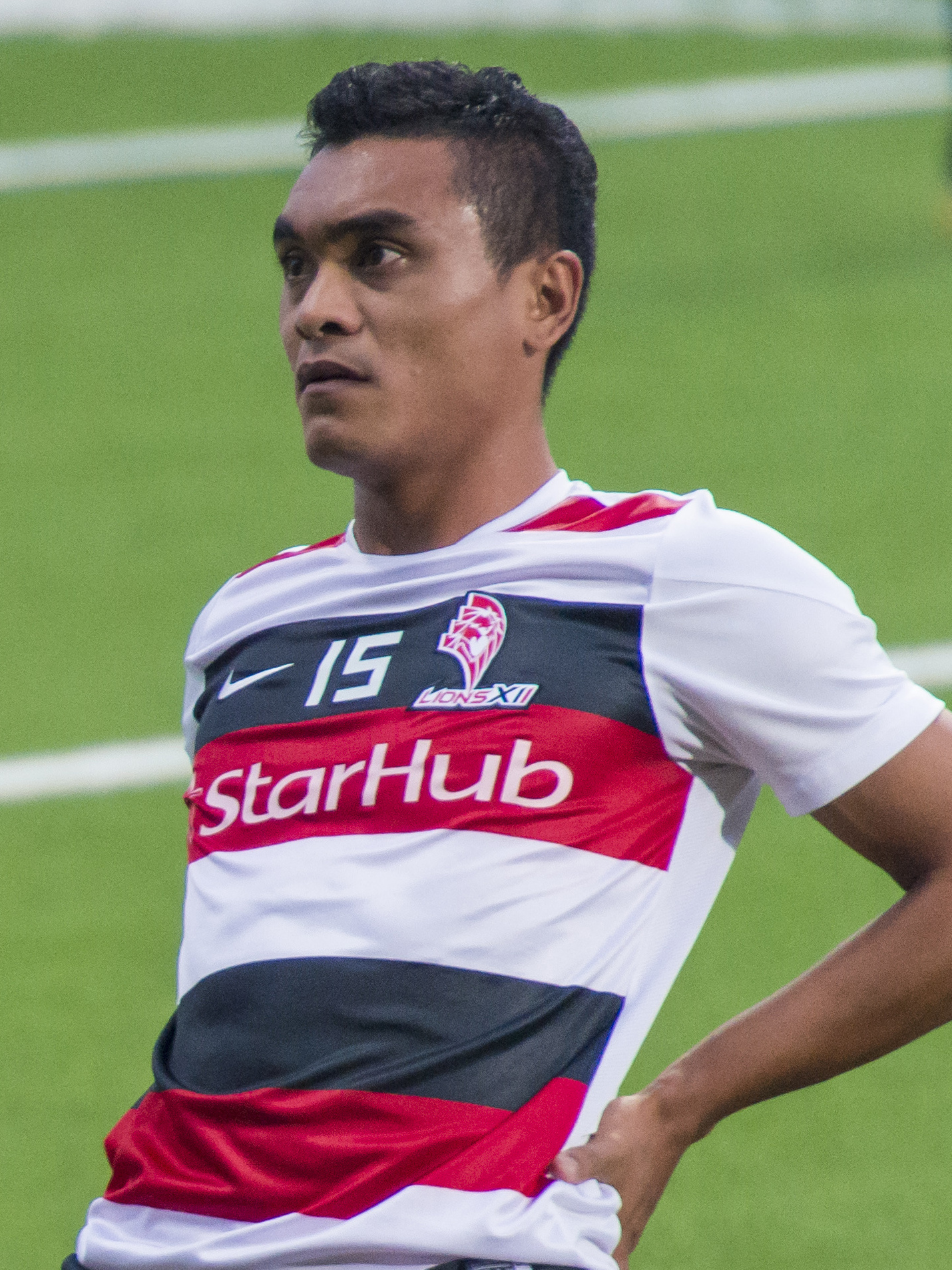
- Sufian Anuar warming up before a MSL match against Kelantan in March 2014.

Personal information
- Full name: Muhammad Sufian bin Anuar
- Date of birth: 26 August 1987 (age 39)
- Place of birth: Singapore
- Height: 1.70 m (5 ft 7 in)
- Position: Forward

Youth career
- 2002–2006: National Football Academy

Senior career*
Years	Team	Apps	(Gls)
2006	Home United	19	(3)
2007–2008	Young Lions	20	(3)
2009–2011	Home United	52	(9)
2012	LionsXII	19	(2)
2013	Warriors	20	(4)
2014	LionsXII	21	(4)
2015	Warriors FC	24	(4)
2016–2017	Tampines Rovers FC	13	(2)
Total		169	(31)

International career^{‡}
2010–2012	Singapore	4	(0)
- * Club domestic league appearances and goals as of 15 April 2014 ‡ National team caps and goals as of 9 February 2013

Muhammad Sufian bin Anuar (born 26 August 1987) is a Singapore international former footballer who played as a forward.

Sufian spent most of his career times as the team backup striker role.

== Club career ==
=== LionsXII ===
==== 2012 season ====
In the 2012 season, Sufian joined LionsXII. On 6 March, he scored his first goal of the season, scoring the Lions' second goal in a 3–1 win against FELDA United. On 20 March, he scored against Selangor at the Jalan Besar Stadium, though the match ended in a 1–1 draw. On 12 May, he scored the Lions' second goal in a 3–3 draw against Kedah. On 16 June, he scored a header from Shaiful Esah's free kick in a 9–0 defeat of Sabah. On 19 June, Sufian scored a late winner against Terengganu away from home. However, the Lions finished league runners-up. Sufian was left out of V. Sundramoorthy's 2013 squad as the Lions added the under-23 squad players to replace the current squad.

==== 2014 season ====
During the 2014 season, Sufian rejoined the Lions XII squad after team captain Shahril Ishak, Hariss Harun and Baihakki Khaizan left the squad. However, he could not make the starting line-up as fellow LionsXII striker, Khairul Amri, was first choice under head coach Fandi Ahmad. On 15 April, during the game against Pahang, Sufian replaced the injured Khairul Nizam, and in the dying minutes of the game, he became the second LionsXII player to score a hat-trick, (first was by Hariss Harun during the game against Sabah) as the Lions won 4–1. He scored a total of 4 goals in 21 matches for the club.

=== 2015 season ===
In January 2015, he rejoined Warriors FC. Despite spending most of his time on the bench, he still managed to score 4 goals in 23 appearances for the club.

=== 2016 season ===
He joined Tampines Rovers FC to serve as a backup striker for Fazrul Nawaz.

== Honours ==
Singapore U17

- Lion City Cup: 2004

LionsXII

- Malaysia Super League: 2013
- FA Cup Malaysia: 2015
