= 2012 LionsXII season =

LionsXII
2012 season
- Chairman: Zainudin Nordin
- Manager: V. Sundramoorthy
- Stadium: Jalan Besar Stadium
- Malaysia Super League: 2nd
- Malaysia FA Cup: Quarter-finals
- Malaysia Cup: Semi-finals
- Top goalscorer: League: Shahril Ishak (10); All: Shahril Ishak (14)
Home colours	Away colours

The 2012 season was LionsXII's debut season in the Malaysia Super League. LionsXII returned to Malaysia competitions 18 years after their predecessor withdrew from the competitions. The Lions finished MSL runners-up at the end of the season.

== Malaysia Super League ==
LionsXII debuted in the 2012 Malaysia Super League on 10 January 2012 with a 1–2 home defeat to defending champions Kelantan FA. The Lions's first win was a 2–1 victory over Kuala Lumpur FA on 17 January. They achieved the biggest win in the season by defeating Sabah FA 9–0 on 16 June 2012. LionsXII eventually finished second in the league behind Kelantan FA.

On 29 December 2012, assistant coach Kadir Yahaya left his position at LionsXII and was replaced by Gombak United FC chief K. Balagumaran.

Date	Pos.	Opponents	H/A	Score	Goalscorers
10 Jan	10th	Kelantan	H	1–2	Baihakki Khaizan 33'
14 Jan	12th	Kedah	A	0–0	
17 Jan	8th	Kuala Lumpur	H	2–1	Aiman Syazwan 43' (og), Shahdan Sulaiman 56'
21 Jan	6th	Sabah	A	0–1	Hariss Harun 19'
28 Jan	7th	Terengganu	H	0–1	
8 Feb	6th	Selangor	A	1–1	Shahril Ishak 43'
11 Feb	4th	Negeri Sembilan	H	3–1	Shahril Ishak 30' (pen), 60', Shahdan Sulaiman 49'
14 Feb	4th	Perak	A	1–2	Shahril Ishak 35', 74'
6 Mar	2nd	FELDA United	H	3–1	Hariss Harun 6', Sufian Anuar 51', Shahril Ishak 67' (pen)
17 Mar	3rd	Sarawak	A	0–1	Shahril Ishak 10' (pen)
20 Mar	2nd	Selangor	H	1–1	Sufian Anuar 62'
31 Mar	2nd	T-Team	H	2–1	Shahril Ishak 51', Shahdan Sulaiman 85' (pen)
3 Apr	1st	Negeri Sembilan	A	2–4	Safuwan Baharudin 14', Khairul Nizam 20', Shahril Ishak 41', Shahdan Sulaiman 70'
7 Apr	1st	Johor FC	A	0–1	Khairul Nizam 42'
10 Apr	1st	Perak	H	2–1	Shahdan Sulaiman 43' (pen), Irwan Shah 87'
14 Apr	1st	PKNS	A	1–0	
17 Apr	1st	PKNS	H	5–0	Safuwan Baharudin 17', Shaiful Esah 19', Sevki Sha'ban 26', Agu Casmir 53', 84'
4 May	1st	Kelantan	A	3–0	
8 May	1st	FELDA United	A	0–2	Shaiful Esah 31', Shahdan Sulaiman 76'
12 May	1st	Kedah	H	3–3	Shahril Ishak 10', Sufian Anuar 29', Baihakki Khaizan 57'
15 May	1st	Kuala Lumpur	A	0–0	
22 May	1st	Sarawak	H	3–0	Safuwan Baharudin 7', Agu Casmir 36', 63'
16 Jun	1st	Sabah	H	9–0	Casmir 19', Hariss 22', 41', 73', Shahdan 62', 65', Irwan 68', Sufian 84', Shahrul 88' (og)
19 Jun	2nd	Terengganu	A	0–1	Sufian Anuar 90'
10 Jul	2nd	T-Team	A	2–1	Bojan Petrić 26' (og)
14 Jul	2nd	Johor FC	H	0–1	

Final standings

Pos	Team	Pld	W	D	L	GF	GA	GD	Pts	Qualification or relegation
1	Kelantan (C, Q)	26	18	6	2	53	18	+35	60	2013 AFC Cup group stage
2	LionsXII (Note: LionsXII are not eligible for any AFC competition spots)	26	15	5	6	48	23	+25	50	
3	Selangor (Q)	26	12	7	7	40	26	+14	43	2013 AFC Cup group stage (Note: Qualified as the next highest-placed local team behind Liga Super and 2012 Piala FA winners Kelantan.)
4	Perak	26	13	3	10	40	43	−3	42	
5	Terengganu	26	11	8	7	41	33	+8	41	

Source: RSSSF
Rules for classification: 1) points; 2) goal difference; 3) number of goals scored
(C) Champions; (Q) Qualified for the phase indicated

== Malaysia FA Cup ==
LionsXII began their 2012 Malaysia FA Cup quest on 18 February, with a 3–0 win over UiTM FC. The LionsXII made their way to the quarter-final with a 2–0 win over Betaria FC on 10 March 2012. However, they were beaten by Terengganu FA in the quarter-finals.

Date	Round	Opponents	H/A	Score	Goalscorers
18 Feb	Round of 32	UiTM	A	0–3	Shaiful Esah 32', Madhu Mohana 15', Shahir Ismail 83' (og)
10 Mar	Round of 16	Betaria	H	2–0	Shahril Ishak 55', Sufian Anuar 84'
24 Mar	Quarter-finals	Terengganu	A	1–0	
27 Mar	Quarter-finals	Terengganu	H	0–0	

== Malaysia Cup ==
The Lions marked their return to their most successful competition with a 0–0 draw away to Johor FC. They eventually bowed out in the semi-finals after losing a penalty shootout to ATM FA with the score tied at 2–2 after extra time.

Date	Round	Opponents	H/A	Score	Goalscorers
22 Aug	Group stage	Johor FC	A	0–0	
25 Aug	Group stage	PKNS	H	3–1	Khairul Amri 13', Shaiful Esah 18', Shahril Ishak 48'
28 Aug	Group stage	Johor FA	A	0–0	
1 Sep	Group stage	Johor FA	H	1–0	Khairul Amri 2'
4 Sep	Group stage	PKNS	A	1–0	
14 Sep	Group stage	Johor FC	H	0–0	
25 Sep	Quarter-finals	Pahang	A	2–1	Jalaluddin Jaafar 20' (og)
2 Oct	Quarter-finals	Pahang	H	2–0	Shahril Ishak 35', 78'
5 Oct	Semi-finals	ATM	H	1–1	Safuwan Baharudin 81'
11 Oct	Semi-finals	ATM	A	1–1 (aet); 5–4 (pso)	Agu Casmir 27'

== Squad statistics ==
Squad No.	Pos.	Name	Malaysia Super League		Malaysia FA Cup		Malaysia Cup		Total	
Squad No.	Pos.	Name	Apps	Goals	Apps	Goals	Apps	Goals	Apps	Goals
1	GK	Izwan Mahbud	11	0	1	0	8	0	20	0
2	MF	Fazli Ayob	1	0	0	0	0	0	1	0
3	DF	Shaiful Esah	16	2	1	1	10	1	27	4
4	MF	Isa Halim	23	0	3	0	8	0	34	0
5	DF	Baihakki Khaizan	16	2	0	0	10	0	26	2
6	DF	Madhu Mohana	11	0	4	1	2	0	17	1
8	MF	Shahdan Sulaiman	25	8	4	0	10	0	39	8
9	MF	Taufiq Rahmat	5	0	1	0	0	0	6	0
10	FW	Khairul Amri	6	0	0	0	9	2	15	2
11	FW	Agu Casmir	14	5	0	0	6	1	20	6
14	MF	Hariss Harun (vc)	22	5	2	0	10	0	34	5
16	DF	Raihan Rahman	7	0	0	0	1	0	8	0
17	FW	Shahril Ishak (c)	19	10	3	1	10	3	32	14
18	GK	Hyrulnizam Juma'at	16	0	3	0	2	0	21	0
19	DF	Irwan Shah	23	2	3	0	9	0	35	2
20	FW	Quentin Chen	15	2	2	0	0	0	17	2
21	DF	Safuwan Baharudin	13	3	2	0	4	1	19	4
22	MF	Sevki Sha'ban	18	1	3	0	6	0	27	1
23	DF	Juma'at Jantan	17	0	0	0	4	0	21	0
24	MF	Firdaus Kasman	15	0	3	0	5	0	23	0
25	FW	Sufian Anuar	17	5	2	1	1	0	20	6
26	DF	Shakir Hamzah	14	0	3	0	0	0	17	0
27	MF	Yasir Hanapi	20	0	1	0	7	0	28	0
28	FW	Safirul Sulaiman	7	0	2	0	9	0	18	0
29	MF	Pravin Guanasagaran	1	0	0	0	0	0	1	0
30	GK	Al-Faiz Ishak	0	0	0	0	0	0	0	0
31	GK	Khairulhin Khalid	0	0	0	0	0	0	0	0
32	DF	Abdil Qaiyyim	2	0	0	0	3	0	5	0
-	DF	Shakir Hamzah	0	0	0	0	0	0	0	0
-	MF	Gabriel Quak	0	0	0	0	0	0	0	0
-	MF	Izzdin Shafiq	0	0	0	0	0	0	0	0

Registered mid-season window
De-registered mid-season window

- LionsXII were restricted to Under-28 players in their first MSL season.
- The number 12 is retired in honour of the fans, also known as the "twelfth man".
