= 2014 LionsXII season =

LionsXII
2014 season
- Chairman: Zainudin Nordin
- Manager: Fandi Ahmad
- Stadium: Jalan Besar Stadium
- Malaysia Super League: 8th
- Malaysia FA Cup: Round of 16
- Top goalscorer: League: Khairul Amri; All: Khairul Amri
- Highest home attendance: 8,000 vs Johor Darul Ta'zim (20 May, Malaysia Super League)
- Lowest home attendance: 4,986 vs Johor Darul Ta'zim (14 Jun, Malaysia Super League)
Home colours	Away colours	Third colours

The 2014 season is LionsXII's third in the Malaysia Super League.

After winning the 2013 Malaysia Super League title, head coach V. Sundramoorthy left for Malaysia Premier League side Negeri Sembilan at the end of the previous season. Singapore legend and former Singapore Lions teammate Fandi Ahmad was appointed as the new head coach on 7 December 2013 with another ex-teammate Nazri Nasir joining him as his assistant on 16 December.

On the playing front, the Lions lost the services of key players midfielder Hariss Harun, defender Baihakki Khaizan, club captain and top-scorer Shahril Ishak to rival Super League clubs. Khairul Amri (Tampines Rovers) and Sufian Anuar (Warriors) were signed to booster the depleted squad while midfielder Isa Halim was appointed the new LionsXII captain.

== Pre-season friendlies ==
LionsXII preceded their campaign with a year-end friendly against under-23 side Young Lions. The team then went on a pre-season tour of Indonesia where they played matches against three local clubs.

Date	Opponents	H/A	Score	Goalscorers
31 Dec	Young Lions	N	1–3	Ignatius Ang 69'
4 Jan	Persis Solo	A	3–0	
7 Jan	PPSM Magelang	A	1–2	Khairul Amri 55', Sufian Anuar 60'
10 Jan	PSS Sleman	A	0–1	Khairul Amri 45'

== Malaysia Super League ==
The Football Association of Singapore (FAS) announced a 24-man squad for the new season in December 2013; eight senior players were included in the initial list. Midfielder Firdaus Kasman (on loan from Tampines Rovers) and centre-back Faliq Sudhir were confirmed as player additions in mid-January. Following the loss of several influential players and an increased foreign player quota for the rest of the league, the Lions targeted a top-three finish in the Malaysian Super League.

LionsXII started their 2014 campaign with a 1–0 loss to Pahang in the Charity Cup and league match season opener. They defeated traditional rivals Selangor with a Khairul Amri injury time goal in the next fixture. A visit to big-spending title favourites Johor Darul Takzim saw them coming back from two goals down to tie the game after Johor's playmaker Pablo Aimar was substituted.

February started with a goalless draw at home to Terengganu despite the Lions' domination of the game. Afiq Yunos' first goal and late winner over ATM saw LionsXII move into the top half of the table for the first time this season. Head coach Fandi Ahmad also revealed he was looking to add a centre-back and a striker to his squad in the April transfer window.

March began on the wrong note for LionsXII. Two defensive lapses, the second resulting from a wrong judgmental call by Isa Halim in the last minute of regulation time, condemned them to a loss to Kelantan and a first league defeat at home in 19 months. LionsXII started with Safuwan Baharudin in a supporting role behind striker Khairul Amri against Sarawak a week later; however they succumbed to a second consecutive defeat. They arrested the slide with a home win over PKNS on 22 March, with Zulfahmi Arifin scoring with a free kick on his return to the first XI and Faris Ramli with the winner on the hour mark. This marked the last game before captain Isa was ruled out for the rest of the league campaign following surgery on his persistent Achilles' tendon injury. Three days later, Safuwan Baharudin scored a late winner over Perak to send LionsXII 5th in the league table. He scored again in a 1–1 draw with T-Team on 29 March.

LionsXII started April with a 2–0 win away to Sime Darby but lost by a goal to the same team in the reverse fixture a week later. Sufian Anuar came on as a second-half substitute and scored a hat-trick to defeat league leaders Pahang 4–1 at home. They ended the month with a 1–0 loss to traditional rivals Selangor, entering the mid-season break sixth in the league standings.

LionsXII re-signed former centre-half Baihakki Khaizan in May. They resumed the league fixtures with a 2–1 loss away to Terengganu on 17 May. Despite leading by two goals, LionsXII conceded three times to lose to Johor Darul Takzim three days later.

The spell continued when LionsXII travelled to hosts Terengganu, as the Turtles staged a comeback to beat the Singaporeans 2–1. LionsXII finally ended the three-match losing streak by edging relegation-threatened ATM in a 2–1 victory, concluding the rounds of fixtures in May.

In June, LionsXII failed to register wins, falling to Kelantan and PKNS 2–1, while being held to a stalemate by Sarawak. Collecting only one point out of the maximum nine, coach Fandi Ahmad reviewed the target set earlier in the year and targeted a top-ten finish in the league instead in order to qualify for the Malaysia Cup without going through the qualification play-offs.

Date	Pos.	Opponents	H/A	Score	Goalscorers
17 Jan	9th	Pahang	A	0–1	
25 Jan	7th	Selangor	H	2–1	Shakir Hamzah 44', Khairul Amri 90'+3
28 Jan	7th	Johor Darul Takzim	A	2–2	Khairul Amri 66', Hafiz Sujad 69'
8 Feb	9th	Terengganu	H	0–0	
15 Feb	5th	ATM	A	1–2	Khairul Amri 47', Afiq Yunos 90'+2
8 Mar	7th	Kelantan	H	1–2	Khairul Amri 26'
15 Mar	8th	Sarawak	A	3–1	Nazrul Nazari 36'
22 Mar	8th	PKNS	H	2–1	Zulfahmi Arifin 43', Faris Ramli 60'
25 Mar	5th	Perak	A	0–1	Safuwan Baharudin 90'+3
29 Mar	5th	T–Team	H	1–1	Safuwan Baharudin 24'
5 Apr	4th	Sime Darby	A	0–2	Safuwan Baharudin 52', Khairul Amri 62'
12 Apr	6th	Sime Darby	H	0–1	
15 Apr	5th	Pahang	H	4–1	Safuwan Baharudin 29', Sufian Anuar 79', 90'+2, 90'+6
19 Apr	6th	Selangor	A	1–0	
17 May	8th	Terengganu	A	2–1	Khairul Amri 8'
20 May	8th	Johor Darul Takzim	H	2–3	Faris Ramli 38', Zulfahmi Arifin 41'
24 May	8th	ATM	H	2–1	Khairul Amri 16', Zulfahmi Arifin 21'
10 Jun	8th	Kelantan	A	2–1	Faris Ramli 68'
14 Jun	8th	Sarawak	H	0–0	
17 Jun	8th	PKNS	A	2–1	Gabriel Quak 25'
21 Jun	8th	Perak	H	0–2	
25 Jun	8th	T–Team	A	0–1	Faris Ramli 66'

Final standings

Pos	Team	Pld	W	D	L	GF	GA	GD	Pts
6	Kelantan	22	10	1	11	26	29	−3	31
7	Sarawak	22	9	3	10	26	31	−5	30
8	LionsXII (Note: LionsXII are not eligible for any AFC competition spots)	22	8	4	10	26	27	−1	28
9	Perak	22	8	2	12	22	27	−5	26
10	ATM	22	6	6	10	29	34	−5	24

Source: RSSSF, FAM Official Site, Astro Arena
Rules for classification: 1) points; 2) goal difference; 3) number of goals scored

== Malaysia FA Cup ==
The Lions suffered an early exit to eventual semi-finalists Pahang in the round of 16 of the 2014 Malaysia FA Cup. Pahang went two goals up before Safuwan Baharudin scored a consolation goal late in the match.

The loss ended an 18-month undefeated streak at the Jalan Besar Stadium.

Date	Round	Opponents	H/A	Score	Goalscorers
21 Jan	Round of 32	DRB-Hicom	H	3–0	Sufian Anuar 28', Gabriel Quak 54', Faris Ramli 90+2'
1 Feb	Round of 16	Pahang	H	1–2	Safuwan Baharudin 86'

== Mid-season friendlies ==
=== Myanmar training tour ===
During the one-month Malaysian Super League break in late April and early May, the LionsXII went on a training tour to Myanmar to play the Myanmar national football team led by former Singapore coach Raddy Avramovic and Myanmar National League side Nay Pyi Taw.

Date	Opponents	H/A	Score	Goalscorers
30 Apr	Nay Pyi Taw	A	1–0	
2 May	Myanmar	A	2–1	Gabriel Quak 36′

=== Singapore training tour ===
The Lions took on S.League clubs Hougang United and Young Lions in their final series of friendly matches.

Date	Opponents	H/A	Score	Goalscorers
7 May	Hougang United	A	1–4	Afiq Yunos 36′, Faritz Hameed 41', Safuwan Baharudin 66', Ignatius Ang 86'
11 May	Young Lions	N	5–1	Safuwan Baharudin 28', Gabriel Quak 32' & 43', Khairul Amri (pen.) 34', Sufian Anuar 74'

== Malaysia Cup ==
Date	Round	Opponents	H/A	Score	People
69 May	Group stage	FELDA United	H		
19 Aug	Group stage	Pahang	H		
22 Aug	Group stage	Johor Darul Takzim	A		
26 Aug	Group stage	Johor Darul Takzim	H		
29 Aug	Group stage	Pahang	A		
2 Sep	Group stage	FELDA United	Majlis Perbandaran Selayang Stadium		

== Squad statistics ==
Squad No.	Pos.	Name	Malaysia Super League		Malaysia FA Cup		Malaysia Cup		Total		Discipline	
Squad No.	Pos.	Name	Apps	Goals	Apps	Goals	Apps	Goals	Apps	Goals	Yellow card	Red card
1	GK	**Izwan Mahbud**	17	0	2	0	0	0	19	0	69	0
2	DF	Shakir Hamzah	17	1	2	0	0	0	19	1	3	0
3	DF	**Afiq Yunos**	14	1	2	0	0	0	16	1	3	0
4	MF	**Isa Halim** (c)	8	0	2	0	0	0	10	0	2	0
5	FW	Syafiq Zainal	1	0	1	0	0	0	2	0	0	0
6	DF	Madhu Mohana	12	0	2	0	0	0	14	0	3	0
7	FW	**Gabriel Quak**	9	0	2	1	0	0	11	1	1	0
8	MF	**Hafiz Sujad**	14	1	2	0	0	0	16	1	2	0
9	DF	**Faritz Hameed**	16	0	2	0	0	0	18	0	3	0
10	FW	Khairul Nizam	2	0	0	0	0	0	2	0	0	0
11	DF	Nazrul Nazari	8	1	1	0	0	0	9	1	0	0
13	MF	Aqhari Abdullah	7	0	0	0	0	0	7	0	2	0
15	FW	**Sufian Anuar**	12	3	2	1	0	0	14	4	0	0
16	MF	Raihan Rahman	9	0	1	0	0	0	10	0	3	0
17	MF	Faris Ramli	17	2	2	1	0	0	19	3	0	0
18	GK	Khairulhin Khalid	0	0	0	0	0	0	0	0	0	0
19	FW	**Khairul Amri**	17	7	1	0	0	0	18	7	0	0
21	DF	Safuwan Baharudin (vc)	17	4	2	1	0	0	19	5	3	0
22	MF	Ignatius Ang	0	0	0	0	0	0	0	0	0	0
23	MF	Zulfahmi Arifin	14	3	2	0	0	0	16	3	5	0
24	MF	**Firdaus Kasman**	13	0	0	0	0	0	13	0	2	0
25	DF	Emmeric Ong	0	0	0	0	0	0	0	0	0	0
26	MF	Shahfiq Ghani	9	0	0	0	0	0	9	0	1	0
27	MF	Samuel Nadarajah	0	0	0	0	0	0	0	0	0	0
28	DF	**Baihakki Khaizan**	2	0	0	0	0	0	2	0	0	0
30	GK	Qadir Yusoff	0	0	0	0	0	0	0	0	0	0
–	DF	**Faliq Sudhir**	0	0	0	0	0	0	0	0	0	0

Registered mid-season window
De-registered mid-season window

- LionsXII are predominantly an Under-23 team. Senior players aged 23 and over are indicated in **bold**. Quota of senior players is subject to approval by the FAM.

Statistics accurate as of match played 24 May 2014.
