= 2013 LionsXII season =

LionsXII
2013 season
- Chairman: Zainudin Nordin
- Manager: V. Sundramoorthy
- Stadium: Jalan Besar Stadium
- Malaysia Super League: 1st
- Malaysia FA Cup: 1st round
- Malaysia Cup: Quarter-finals
- Top goalscorer: League: Shahril Ishak (8); All: Shahril Ishak (9)
Home colours	Away colours

The 2013 season was LionsXII's 2nd season in the Malaysia Super League, when they won their first MSL title.

LionsXII were set a target of finishing in the top five for the 2013 Malaysia Super League. Five senior players, namely Shahril Ishak, Isa Halim, Fazrul Nawaz, Irwan Shah and Baihakki Khaizan were included in the 29-man squad, while other key players such as Shahdan Sulaiman and Shaiful Esah were left out. The main aim was to develop the U-23 players and prepare them for the upcoming 2013 Southeast Asian Games held in Myanmar at the end of the year.

== Malaysia Super League ==
LionsXII began their campaign by defeating ATM FA 1–0 away. Subsequently, they vanquished the nation's traditional rivals Selangor FA. However, they stumbled to three losses against lowly T-Team FC and PKNS FC away. One sent them crashing out of the 2013 Malaysia FA Cup. In a turn of events, LionsXII went on a long unbeaten streak, securing important wins over Pahang FA (3–0), Kelantan FA (1–0), and ATM FA (3–1) at home.

On 2 July 2013, a 4–0 win over relegation-threatened FELDA United FC in the penultimate league game made LionsXII league champions. Singapore Prime Minister Lee Hsien Loong was present for the match played in front of a sold-out crowd at the Jalan Besar Stadium. The MSL trophy was also brought to the stadium as the LionsXII received it on home soil after the final whistle. LionsXII became the first foreign team to win the MSL, adding to the four Malaysian league titles it had won in 1979, 1981, 1985, and 1994. The title run was defined by a combination of good defence (15 goals conceded, the best record in the MSL) and goals from set-pieces (17 out of 32). The club also went invincible at home (10 wins and 1 draw) in the league.

The news of V. Sundramoorthy leaving to helm Negeri Sembilan FA was confirmed on 7 October 2013. On 13 October, the Football Association of Singapore posted an advertisement openly to recruit the succeeding LionsXII coach. Former Johor Darul Takzim coach and ex-Singapore international Fandi Ahmad is speculated to take over the position. Other candidates include former Warriors FC coach Richard Bok and Liverpool F.C. stalwart Steve McMahon.

Date	Pos.	Opponents	H/A	Score	Goalscorers
9 Jan	5th	ATM	A	0–1	Shahril 66'
12 Jan	2nd	Selangor	H	1–0	Fazrul 23'
15 Jan	4th	PKNS	A	1–0	
19 Jan	3rd	Terengganu	H	2–1	Safuwan 64', Syafiq 74'
22 Jan	4th	T-Team	A	1–0	
16 Feb	2nd	Pahang	H	3–0	Faris 12', Safuwan 64', Fazrul 76'
19 Feb	2nd	Johor Darul Takzim	A	2–2	Hariss 4', Baihakki 38'
2 Mar	3rd	FELDA United	A	0–0	
9 Mar	3rd	Kelantan	H	1–0	Shahfiq 87'
30 Mar	1st	Negeri Sembilan	H	1–0	Shahril 79'
6 Apr	1st	Perak	H	2–1	Shahril 7', 57'
13 Apr	1st	Negeri Sembilan	A	1–1	Fazrul 19'
20 Apr	1st	ATM FA	H	3–1	Shahfiq 27', 70', Shahril 45'+1 (pen.)
27 Apr	1st	Selangor	A	0–0	
7 May	1st	Terengganu	A	1–2	Baihakki 78', Hasmizan 90'+1 (o.g.)
11 May	1st	T-Team	H	3–0	Shahril 9', Shakir 28', Fazrul 35'
17 May	1st	Pahang	A	1–1	Shahril 11'
27 May	1st	PKNS	H	3–1	Hariss 54', Nazrul 58', Khairul Nizam 89'
22 Jun	1st	Johor Darul Takzim	H	1–1	Safuwan 82'
25 Jun	1st	Perak	A	1–1	Shahfiq 75'
2 Jul	1st	FELDA United	H	4–0	Azrul 46' (o.g.), Shahril 57', Fazrul 61', Shahfiq 83'
6 Jul	1st	Kelantan	A	2–0	

Final standings

Pos	Team	Pld	W	D	L	GF	GA	GD	Pts	Qualification or relegation
1	LionsXII (Note: LionsXII was not eligible for any AFC competition spots as they were a foreign side.)	22	12	7	3	32	15	+17	43	
2	Selangor	22	10	10	2	31	17	+14	40	2014 AFC Cup group stage
3	Johor Darul Ta'zim	22	11	7	4	32	26	+6	40	
4	Kelantan	22	10	6	6	32	20	+12	36	2014 AFC Cup group stage (Note: Qualified as 2013 Piala FA winners)
5	Pahang	22	10	5	7	36	32	+4	35	

Source: RSSSF
Rules for classification: 1) points; 2) goal difference; 3) number of goals scored

== Malaysia FA Cup ==
Following inclement weather and a water-logged pitch, the match against PKNS was abandoned in the 38th minute with PKNS leading 1–0. The scoreline was reset for the rescheduled match but the teams had to submit the same starting line-ups. LionsXII were forced to bring on two substitutes in Faris Azienuddin and Izzdin Shafiq in the first minute as initial players Faritz Hameed and Shahril Ishak were unavailable. Raihan Rahman was dismissed for a second yellow card in the 24th minute with his first caution from the abandoned match carrying over. Fauzan Dzulkifli scored the only goal in the match to knock the Lions out of the competition.

Date	Round	Opponents	H/A	Score	Goalscorers
26 Jan	Round 1	PKNS	A	1–0	

== Malaysia Cup ==
On 27 July, LionsXII were drawn into Group D for the 2013 Malaysia Cup with Perak FA, Sarawak FA and Kedah FA. They drew Kedah (2–2) in Singapore and succumbed to two collapses against Perak (1–0) and Sarawak (2–1). With those results, they nearly bowed out of the tournament. At that time, coach V. Sundramoorthy was rumoured to leave LionsXII at the end of the season to take charge of Malaysian Premier League side Negeri Sembilan FA.On the contrary, LionsXII eked out three victories (2–1 versus Perak, 1–0 versus Sarawak and 3–1 versus Kedah which marked the biggest away accomplishment of the season) out of the three remaining games to progress to the next round.

On 28 September, LionsXII narrowed a 1–0 victory over ATM FA in the first leg of the quarter-finals of the 2013 Malaysia Cup but squandered their lead and lost 1–4 in the return fixture on 4 October.

Date	Round	Opponents	H/A	Score	Goalscorers
20 Aug	Group stage	Kedah	H	2–2	Shahril 10', Shahfiq 64'
24 Aug	Group stage	Sarawak	A	2–1	Safuwan 76'
27 Aug	Group stage	Perak	A	1–0	
31 Aug	Group stage	Perak	H	2–1	Hariss 61', Safuwan 84'
18 Sep	Group stage	Sarawak	H	1–0	Fazrul 63'
21 Sep	Group stage	Kedah	A	1–3	Hariss 23', Baihakki 37', Hafiz 65'
28 Sep	Quarter-finals	ATM	H	1–0	Madhu 39'
4 Oct	Quarter-finals	ATM	A	4–1	Hafiz 48'

== Squad statistics ==
Squad No.	Pos.	Name	Malaysia Super League		Malaysia FA Cup		Malaysia Cup		Total		Discipline	
Squad No.	Pos.	Name	Apps	Goals	Apps	Goals	Apps	Goals	Apps	Goals	Yellow card	Red card
1	GK	Izwan Mahbud	21	0	1	0	8	0	30	0	1	0
2	DF	Shakir Hamzah	14	1	0	0	8	0	22	1	3	0
3	DF	Faris Azienuddin	4	0	1	0	0	0	5	0	0	0
4	MF	Isa Halim	21	0	1	0	8	0	30	0	5	0
5	DF	Baihakki Khaizan	15	2	1	0	8	1	24	3	13	1
6	DF	Madhu Mohana	4	0	0	0	3	1	7	1	3	1
7	FW	Gabriel Quak	11	0	1	0	3	0	15	0	1	0
8	MF	Hafiz Abu Sujad	18	0	1	0	7	2	26	2	11	0
9	DF	Faritz Hameed	16	0	1	0	7	0	24	0	3	0
10	FW	Fazrul Nawaz	18	5	1	0	7	1	26	6	3	1
11	MF	Safirul Sulaiman	16	0	0	0	0	0	16	0	2	0
13	MF	Izzdin Shafiq	9	0	1	0	1	0	11	0	0	0
14	MF	Hariss Harun (vc)	16	2	0	0	8	2	24	4	3	0
15	MF	Zulfahmi Arifin	5	0	0	0	3	0	8	0	2	0
16	MF	Fazli Ayob	1	0	0	0	1	0	2	0	1	0
16*	DF	Raihan Rahman	4	0	1	0	0	0	5	0	2	1
17	FW	Shahril Ishak (c)	21	8	1	0	6	1	28	9	2	0
18	GK	Khairulhin Khalid	2	0	0	0	0	0	2	0	0	0
19	DF	Irwan Shah	15	0	1	0	2	0	18	0	2	0
20	FW	Quentin Chen	3	1	0	0	1	0	4	1	0	0
21	DF	Safuwan Baharudin	18	3	1	0	7	2	26	5	9	0
22	FW	Randy Pay	0	0	0	0	0	0	0	0	0	0
22*	FW	Iqbal Hussain	1	0	0	0	0	0	1	0	0	0
23	DF	Nazrul Nazari	15	1	0	0	6	0	21	1	4	0
24	FW	Faris Ramli	8	1	0	0	6	0	14	1	0	0
25	DF	Ali Hudzaifi Yusof	2	0	0	0	0	0	2	0	0	0
26	MF	Shahfiq Ghani	13	5	0	0	6	1	19	6	3	1
27	MF	Aqhari Abdullah	4	0	1	0	3	0	8	0	2	0
28	GK	Neezam Aziz	0	0	0	0	0	0	0	0	0	0
29	GK	Syed Sufian	0	0	0	0	0	0	0	0	0	0
30	FW	Syafiq Zainal	8	1	0	0	1	0	9	1	0	0
31	DF	Fariss Hamran	0	0	0	0	0	0	0	0	0	0

Registered mid-season window
De-registered mid-season window

- Five senior players aged 23 and over were included in the 2013 squad.

Statistics accurate as of match played 4 October 2013
