= Gabriel Quak =

Singaporean professional footballer (born 1990)

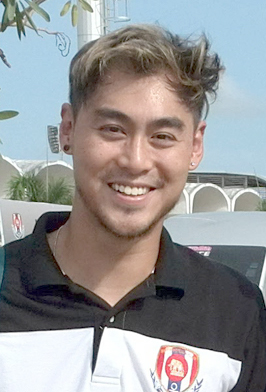
- Gabriel Quak in 2018

Personal information
- Full name: Gabriel Quak Jun Yi
- Date of birth: 22 December 1990 (age 35)
- Place of birth: Singapore
- Height: 1.78 m (5 ft 10 in)
- Position: Winger

Youth career
- National Football Academy

Senior career*
Years	Team	Apps	(Gls)
2008–2011	Young Lions	66	(5)
2012–2015	LionsXII	80	(10)
2016–2017	Geylang International	47	(6)
2018	Royal Thai Navy	13	(3)
2019	Warriors	23	(9)
2020–2022	Lion City Sailors	59	(29)
2023–2025	Hougang United	46	(8)
Total		334	(70)

International career^{‡}
2013	Singapore U23	5	(2)
2013–2022	Singapore	40	(6)
Medal record
Men's football
Representing Singapore
Sea Games
Bronze medal – third place	Vientiane 2009	Football
Bronze medal – third place	Naypyidaw 2013	Football
- * Club domestic league appearances and goals as of 29 May 2023 ‡ National team caps and goals as of 14 June 2022

Gabriel Quak Jun Yi (Chinese: 郭俊谊, born 22 December 1990) is a Singaporean former professional footballer who played as a winger. He represented the Singapore national team.

== Club career ==
=== Young Lions ===
Gabriel began his professional football career with Young Lions in the 2008 S.League season. On 19 February, he make his professional debut coming on a substitution in a match against Sengkang Punggol. Gabriel scored his first career goal in a 3–1 lost against Super Reds on 26 May.

Gabriel was one of the Young Lions players involved in an on-pitch fight with Beijing Guoan Talent players in their S.League match on 7 September 2010. He was charged by the Football Association of Singapore (FAS) for gross misconduct and bringing the game into disrepute and was banned for four months and fined S$1,000 for his part in the brawl. Quak missed the 2010 Asian Games as a result of the ban.

=== LionsXII ===
On 5 December 2011, the FAS announced that Gabriel was to join the newly formed LionsXII for the 2012 Malaysia Super League. National service commitments however meant that Quak failed to make a single appearance throughout the 2012 season. He was de-registered in the mid-season transfer window.

Gabriel returned to the LionsXII squad for the 2013 season. He made his long-awaited debut against PKNS on 15 January. He made 15 appearances in all competitions as the Lions won the 2013 Malaysia Super League.

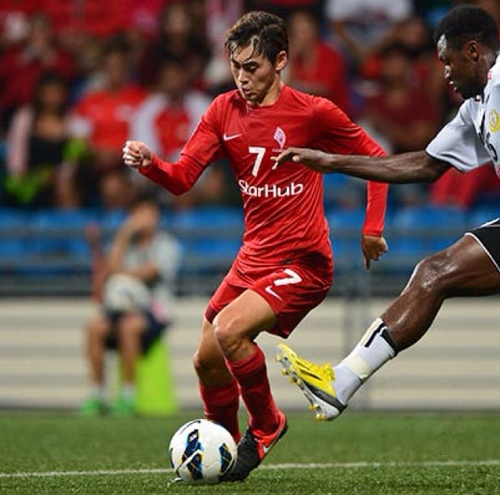
Quak playing for LionsXII in 2013

The left-footed Gabriel was switched to the right side of attack for both club and country for the 2014 season. He scored his first LionsXII goal in a 3–0 win over DRB-Hicom in the Malaysia FA Cup on 21 January. He scored his first league goal, an opener against newly promoted side PDRM FA, as Lionsxii defeated them 5–3.

On the opening day of the 2015 season, Gabriel scored the Lionsxii's first goal of the season, helping the Lionsxii win their opening match 5–3 against PDRM FA. Similarly, in the LionsXII's opening game in the Malaysia FA Cup on 28 February, Gabriel scored the 3rd goal in a 4–0 win against minnows Kedah United to push the LionsXII into the round of 16. In the round of 16, Gabriel scored a goal against SPA in a 4–0 win to send the team to the quarter-finals. He helped LionsXII to win the 2015 Malaysia FA Cup.

=== Geylang International ===
Following the dissolution of the LionsXII, Gabriel signed for Geylang International in January 2016. He make his debut on 15 February in the Eastern Derby match against Tampines Rovers in a 3–3 match. On 1 April, he scored his first goal for the club in a 2–2 league match against Warriors FC, ending a long goalscoring drought.

==== Matsumoto Yamaga trial ====
After Geylang International and Matsumoto Yamaga signed a MOU, Quak together with fellow winger Shawal Anuar went on a one-week trial with the J2 League side.

=== Royal Thai Navy ===
On 2 February 2018,Gabriel signs for Thai League 1 side Royal Thai Navy and fill up their ASEAN import slot ahead of the In the upcoming 2018 season. On 11 February, Gabriel made his starting debut against Ubon UMT United. He started as the 1st eleven in the 1st 2 matches but was substituted at half time in both matches. Gabriel scored his first goal for the club in a 3–2 thriller win against Sukhothai

In total, Gabriel scored 4 goals and created 1 assist in 24 games for the Thai side which were relegated eventually.

=== Warriors FC ===
In January 2019, Gabriel signed for Warriors FC for the 2019 season despite receiving lucrative offers from overseas club in order to spend more time with his young family. During the 2019 Singapore Cup, Warriors' captain Khairul Nizam was injured and Gabriel took over the captaincy for the competition.

=== Lion City Sailors ===
In January 2020, Gabriel joined the newly privatised Singapore club, Lion City Sailors. He make his debut for the club in a league match against Tanjong Pagar United where he assisted Andy Pengelly in a 1–1 draw.

In 2021, Gabriel won the league 'Goal of the Year' for his volley goal in the 4–1 win over Balestier Khalsa on 18 April during the FAS Awards Night.

On 15 April 2022, Gabriel make his AFC Champions League debut against eventual winners from Japan, Urawa Red Diamonds in a 4–1 lost. On 24 April, he provided an assist to Pedro Henrique in a 3–2 win over Chinese side Shandong Taishan. Gabriel was then released by Lion City Sailors on 28 November 2022. He departed after scoring 29 goals across three seasons for the Sailors, as well as winning the Singapore Premier League 'Player of the Year' award in 2020.

=== Hougang United ===
Following his release from Lion City Sailors, Gabrel signed for Hougang United on 18 January 2023 to boost the range of attacking options in head coach Firdaus Kassim's squad. The 32-year-old joins his fifth Singapore Premier League club in his 11th SPL season. On 19 April 2024, he extended his contract until the end of the 2024–25 season. On 4 June 2025, Gabriel was released by the cheetahs upon the expiry of his contract, ending his career with the cheetahs with 9 goals and 7 assists.

== International career ==
=== Youth ===
Gabriel has played for Singapore at Under-15, Under-18 and Under-23 levels. He represented Singapore in the Lion City Cup, AFF U15 Tournament, Asian Youth Games Qualifiers, AFC U18 Qualifiers, VFF Cup and Southeast Asian Games.

=== Senior ===
Gabriel earned his first international cap in a friendly match against Laos on 7 June 2013, scoring a goal on his debut. His first competitive goal came in an upset 2–1 win over Syria in a 2015 AFC Asian Cup qualification match on 15 October 2013. He is the first Singapore-born Chinese player to feature regularly for the national team in 7 years since Goh Tat Chuan despite the ethnic Chinese forming the majority of the population.

Gabriel scored a goal and recorded an assist during the 2023 AFC Asian Cup qualification match in a 6–2 over Myanmar.

=== Others ===
==== Singapore Selection Squad ====
He was selected as part of the Singapore Selection squad for The Sultan of Selangor’s Cup to be held on 6 May 2017.

== Personal life ==
Gabriel was born on 22 December 1990 to Alan, a technical associate at a building consultancy and Juet May, an early childhood educator in 1990. He has a younger sister, Gu Ting.

Gabriel received his primary school education at Catholic High School and went to Guangyang Secondary School. He graduated with a diploma in Industrial and Operations Management from Republic Polytechnic.

Gabriel is married and has three children.

== Career statistics ==
=== Club ===
As of match played 17 Aug 22. Caps and goals may not be correct.

Club	Season	S.League		Singapore Cup		Singapore League Cup		Asia		Total	
Club	Season	Apps	Goals	Apps	Goals	Apps	Goals	Apps	Goals	Apps	Goals
Young Lions	2008	26	2	-	-	-	-	—		26	2
Young Lions	2009	20	2	-	-	-	-	—		20	2
Young Lions	2010	15	0	-	-	18	0	—		33	0
Young Lions	2011	5	1	—		—		—		5	1
Young Lions	Total	66	5	0	0	18	0	0	0	84	5
Club	Season	Malaysia Super League		Malaysia FA Cup		Malaysia Cup		Asia		Total	
LionsXII	2012	0	0	0	0	0	0	—		0	0
LionsXII	2013	11	0	1	0	3	0	—		15	0
LionsXII	2014	9	0	2	1	0	0	—		11	1
LionsXII	2015	3	1	1	1	0	0	—		4	2
LionsXII	Total	23	1	4	2	3	0	0	0	30	3
Club	Season	S.League		Singapore Cup		Singapore League Cup		Asia		Total	
Geylang International	2016	23	4	3	0	0	0	—		26	4
Geylang International	2017	24	2	1	0	3	1	—		28	3
Geylang International	Total	47	6	4	0	3	1	0	0	54	7
Club	Season	Thai League 1		Thai FA Cup		Thai League Cup		Asia		Total	
Navy	2018	13	3	1	1	1	0	—		15	4
Navy	Total	13	3	1	1	1	0	0	0	15	4
Club	Season	Singapore Premier League		Singapore Cup		Singapore League Cup		Asia		Total	
Warriors	2019	23	9	6	2	0	0	—		29	11
Warriors	Total	23	9	6	2	0	0	0	0	29	11
Lion City Sailors	2020	14	5	0	0	0	0	0	0	14	5
Lion City Sailors	2021	21	13	0	0	0	0	0	0	21	13
Lion City Sailors	2022	24	11	3	0	0	0	4	0	31	11
Lion City Sailors	Total	59	29	3	0	0	0	4	0	66	29
Hougang United	2023	23	6	0	0	1	0	0	0	24	6
Hougang United	Total	23	6	0	0	1	0	0	0	24	6
Career total		254	59	18	5	26	0	4	0	302	64

- Young Lions and LionsXII are ineligible for qualification to AFC competitions in their respective leagues.
- Young Lions withdrew from the Singapore Cup and Singapore League Cup in 2011 due to scheduled participation in the 2011 AFF U-23 Youth Championship.

== International statistics ==
=== International goals ===
Scores and results list Singapore's goal tally first.

No.	Date	Venue	Opponent	Score	Result	Competition
1.	7 June 2013	New Laos National Stadium, Vientiane, Laos	Laos	4–2	5–2	Friendly
2.	15 October 2013	Jalan Besar Stadium, Jalan Besar, Singapore	Syria	2–0	2–1	2015 AFC Asian Cup qualification
3.	12 October 2018	Bishan Stadium, Jalan Besar, Singapore	Mongolia	2–0	2–0	Friendly
4.	9 June 2019	National Stadium, Kallang, Singapore	Solomon Islands	3–3	4–3	Friendly
5.	11 June 2019	National Stadium, Kallang, Singapore	Myanmar	1–1	1–2	Friendly
6.	14 June 2022	Dolen Omurzakov Stadium, Bishkek, Kyrgyzstan	Myanmar	2–0	6–2	2023 AFC Asian Cup qualification

=== U22 International goals ===
Scores and results list Singapore's goal tally first.

No.	Date	Venue	Opponent	Score	Result	Competition
1.	17 November 2011	Gelora Bung Karno Stadium, Jakarta, Indonesia	Thailand	1–0	2-0 (won)	2011 Southeast Asian Games

=== U19 International goals ===
Scores and results list Singapore's goal tally first.

No.	Date	Venue	Opponent	Score	Result	Competition
1.	5 August 2007	Thanh Long Sports Center, Ho Chi Minh City, Vietnam	Myanmar	1–2	1-2 (lost)	2007 AFF U-20 Youth Championship

Singapore national team
Year	Apps	Goals
2013	4	2
2014	5	0
2015	5	0
2016	8	0
2017	0	0
2018	2	1
Total	24	3

Statistics accurate as of match played 12 October 2018

== Honours ==
=== Club ===
==== LionsXII ====
- Malaysia Super League: 2013
- Malaysia FA Cup: 2015

==== Lion City Sailors ====
- Singapore Premier League: 2021
- Singapore Community Shield: 2022

=== International ===
==== Singapore ====
- Lion City Cup: 2006
- Southeast Asian Games Bronze Medal: 2009, 2013

=== Individual ===
- Singapore Premier League Player of the Month: May 2019
- Singapore Premier League Player of the Year: 2020
- Singapore Premier League Team of the Year: 2020
- Singapore Premier League Goal of the Year: 2021
