= Shakir Hamzah =

Singaporean footballer (born 1992)

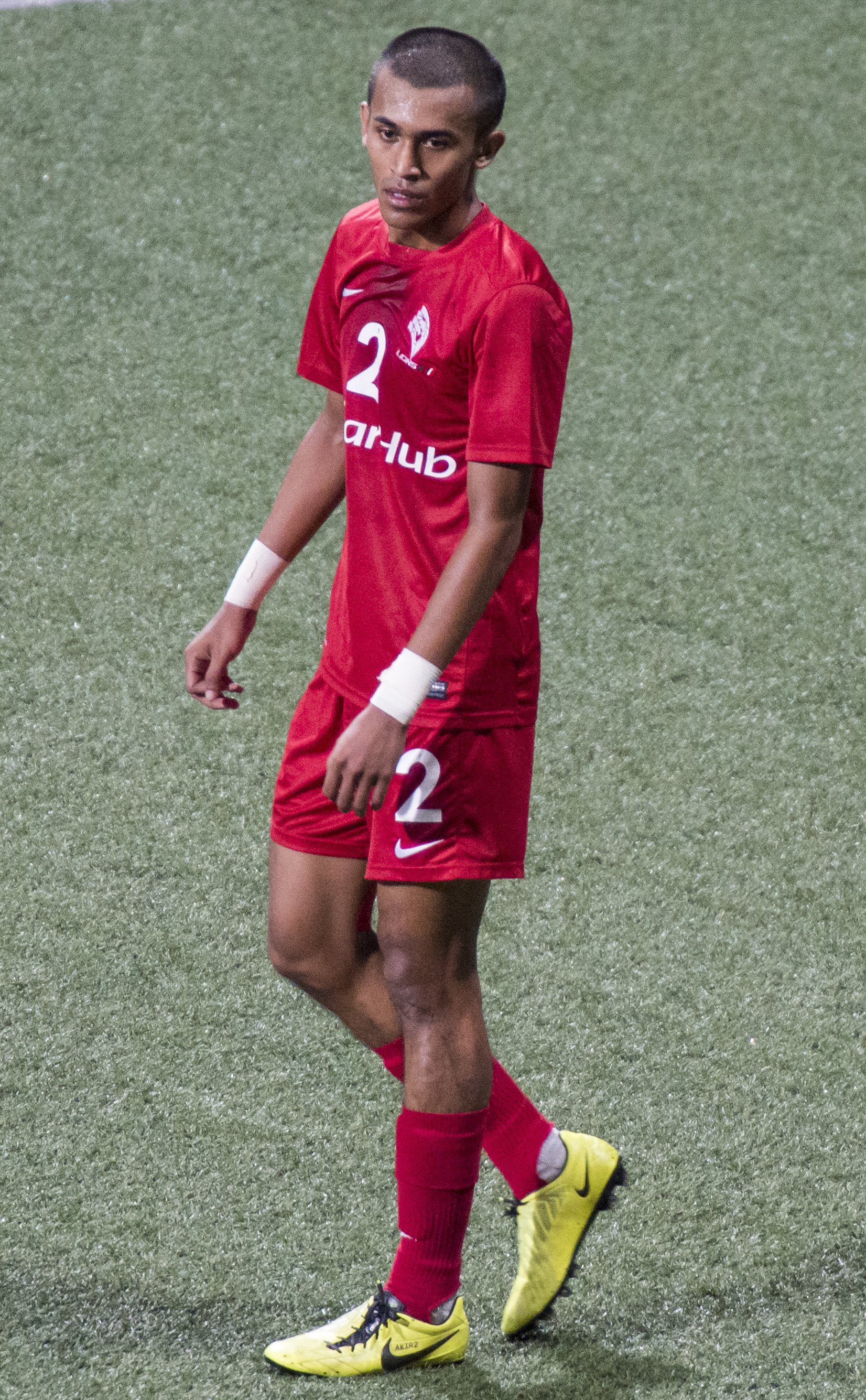

Personal information
- Full name: Muhammad Shakir bin Hamzah
- Date of birth: 20 October 1992 (age 34)
- Place of birth: Singapore
- Height: 1.80 m (5 ft 11 in)
- Positions: Left-back; centre-back

Team information
- Current team: Balestier Khalsa
- Number: 4

Youth career
- National Football Academy

Senior career*
Years	Team	Apps	(Gls)
2009–2011	Courts Young Lions	29	(0)
2012–2015	LionsXII	73	(4)
2016–2017	Tampines Rovers	30	(4)
2018	Home United	21	(3)
2019–2020	Kedah Darul Aman	30	(5)
2021	Perak	13	(0)
2021–2023	Tanjong Pagar United	35	(5)
2024–2026	Geylang International	37	(5)
2026–	Balestier Khalsa	0	(0)

International career^{‡}
2012–	Singapore	68	(4)
- * Club domestic league appearances and goals as of 21 November 2026 ‡ National team caps and goals as of 14 December 2024

Muhammad Shakir bin Hamzah (born 20 October 1992), better known as Shakir Hamzah or just Shakir, is a Singaporean professional footballer who plays either as a left-back or centre-back for Singapore Premier League club Geylang International and the Singapore national team.

== Club career ==
=== Young Lions ===
Shakir began his career with Young Lions in the 2009 S.League after graduating from the National Football Academy.

=== LionsXII ===
In December 2011, Shakir was named in the newly formed LionsXII squad for the 2012 Malaysia Super League. He played on the left side of defence as the Lions won the 2013 Malaysia Super League title.

In June 2013, Shakir served four days of detention for going absent without leave from his National Service. He had travelled away with the LionsXII squad for a Super League match with Pahang on 17 May without obtaining official approval. He was suspended from all football activities by the Football Association of Singapore pending an investigation and was later fined S$4,000 and ordered to serve 30 hours of community service in football-related activities.

=== Tampines Rovers ===
Following the disbandment of the LionsXII, Shakir signed for S.League powerhouse Tampines Rovers on a two-year contract.

=== Home United ===
Shakir was released by Tampines following the conclusion of the 2017 S.League season due to disciplinary issues. He was subsequently signed by Home United for the newly revamp 2018 Singapore Premier League season.

=== Kedah Darul Aman ===
On 12 December 2018, Shakir signed for Malaysia Super League club, Kedah Darul Aman for the 2019 season. His first season for the Malaysian side was a success; playing as a centre back, he scored 4 goals for the club and was named in the 2019 Malaysia Super League 'Team of the Season' while also helping his side advancing all the way to the 2019 Malaysia FA Cup Final. Shakir won the 2019 Malaysia FA Cup in his first season with the club.

=== Perak ===
In December 2020, Shakir had joined Perak a year after joining Kedah Darul Aman.

In May 2021, Shakir left Perak after mutually consenting to termination of his contract due to Perak's financial problems.

=== Tanjong Pagar United ===
On 16 July 2021, Shakir officially signed for Tanjong Pagar United and return to Singapore Premier League. Shakir make his first appearance for Tanjong Pagar against Geylang International when Delwinder Singh was injured before the match and replaced him. His debut appearance saw him scoring an own goal in a 3–1 defeat.

=== Geylang International ===
On 21 January 2024, Shakir joined Geylang International on a free transfer ahead of the 2024–25 Singapore Premier League season. On his official debut for the club on 10 May, he scored his goal in a 2–2 draw against Balestier Khalsa with a rocket towards the top right corner of the net.

== International career ==
Shakir was part of the 2013 Southeast Asian Games squad which won a bronze medal. He made his senior team debut starting in the first leg of the Causeway Challenge against Malaysia on 8 June 2012. He scored his first international goal in a 1–1 draw against Turkmenistan in a 2019 AFC Asian Cup qualification match. He followed up with his second international goal in a 3–2 friendly win over Maldives at the Singapore National Stadium. It was also his second consecutive international goal.

On 13 June 2017, He was locally famous for trying to score from the side of the halfway line into the back of the net against Argentina.

On 10 September 2019, Shakir scored a volley with his weak foot to secure a famous 2–1 victory against Palestine at the Jalan Besar Stadium.

In June 2021, Shakir pulled out of the Singapore team before Singapore's World Cup qualifying match against Saudi Arabia. Shakir responded that he had to return to Malaysia to handle legal matters moving his family from Malaysia to Singapore.

Shakir was called up to the national team for the 2020 AFF Championship held in Singapore in 2021. On 14 December 2021, Shakir scored the second goal against Timor-Leste in a 2-0 win during the group stage of the tournament. During the final group match against Thailand on 18 December 2021, Shakir collided with Thitiphan Puangchan in the 11th minute. Shakir was stretchered out and was substituted for the match. He suffered various injuries and was ruled out for the rest of the tournament.

After nearly a year being injured, Shakir returned to the national team playing in the friendly against Maldives on 17 December 2022 in which he was called up to the 2022 AFF Championship squad.

== Others ==
=== Singapore Selection Squad ===
Shakir was part of the Singapore Selection squad for The Sultan of Selangor's Cup held on 6 May 2017.

== Personal life ==
Shakir is the son of former Singapore left-back Hamzah Haron. His older brother is ex-LionsXII teammate Shahir Hamzah.

== Career statistics ==
=== Club ===
As of 21 November 2026. Caps and goals may not be correct.

Club	Season	S.League		Singapore Cup		Singapore League Cup		Asia		Total	
Club	Season	Apps	Goals	Apps	Goals	Apps	Goals	Apps	Goals	Apps	Goals
Young Lions	2010	18	0	4	0	1	0	—		23	0
Young Lions	2011	11	0	—		—		—		11	0
Young Lions	Total	29	0	4	0	1	0	0	0	34	0
Club	Season	Malaysia Super League		Malaysia FA Cup		Malaysia Cup		Asia		Total	
LionsXII	2012	9	0	3	0	0	0	—		12	0
LionsXII	2013	14	1	0	0	8	0	—		22	1
LionsXII	2014	17	1	2	0	0	0	—		19	1
LionsXII	2015	??	??	??	??	??	??	—		??	??
LionsXII	Total	40	2	5	0	8	0	0	0	53	2
Club	Season	S.League		Singapore Cup		Singapore League Cup		Asia		Total	
Tampines Rovers	2016	20	2	4	0	0	0	6	0	30	0
Tampines Rovers	2017	10	2	2	0	0	0	4	0	16	2
Tampines Rovers	Total	30	4	6	0	0	0	10	0	46	2
Home United	2018	21	3	5	0	0	0	10	1	36	4
Home United	Total	21	3	5	0	0	0	10	1	36	4
Club	Season	Malaysia Super League		Malaysia FA Cup		Malaysia Cup		Asia		Total	
Kedah FA	2019	20	4	7	0	10	1	—		37	5
Kedah FA	2020	10	1	0	0	1	1	0	0	11	2
Kedah FA	Total	30	5	7	0	11	2	0	0	48	7
Perak	2021	13	0	0	0	0	0	0	0	13	0
Perak	Total	13	0	0	0	0	0	0	0	13	0
Club	Season	SPL		Singapore Cup		Singapore League Cup		Asia		Total	
Tanjong Pagar United	2021	9	1	0	0	0	0	0	0	9	1
Tanjong Pagar United	2022	5	0	2	0	0	0	0	0	7	0
Tanjong Pagar United	2023	21	4	3	0	0	0	0	0	24	4
Tanjong Pagar United	Total	35	5	5	0	0	0	0	0	40	5
Geylang International	2024–25	27	5	2	0	0	0	0	0	29	5
Geylang International	2025–26	10	0	1	0	0	0	0	0	11	0
Geylang International	Total	37	5	3	0	0	0	0	0	40	5
Balestier Khalsa	2026–27	0	0	0	0	0	0	0	0	0	0
Balestier Khalsa	Total	0	0	0	0	0	0	0	0	0	0
Career total		235	24	35	0	20	2	20	1	310	27

- Young Lions and LionsXII are ineligible for qualification to AFC competitions in their respective leagues.
- Young Lions withdrew from the Singapore Cup and Singapore League Cup in 2011 due to scheduled participation in the 2011 AFF U-23 Youth Championship.

== International statistics ==
Singapore national team
Year	Apps	Goals
2012	1	0
2013	6	0
2014	5	0
2015	8	0
2016	10	0
2017	6	1
2018	9	1
2019	4	1
Total	49	3

Statistics accurate as of match played 5 March 2014

=== International caps ===
No	Date	Venue	Opponent	Result	Competition
5	6 February 2013	King Abdullah Stadium, Amman, Jordan	Jordan	0-4 (lost)	2015 AFC Asian Cup qualification
6	4 June 2013	Thuwunna Stadium, Yangon, Myanmar	Myanmar	2-0 (won)	Friendly
7	7 June 2013	New Laos National Stadium, Vientiane, Laos	Laos	5-2 (won)	Friendly
8	6 September 2013	TEDA Soccer Stadium, Tianjin, China	China	1-6 (lost)	Friendly
9	15 November 2013	Shahid Dastgerdi Stadium, Tehran, Iran	Syria	0-4 (lost)	2015 AFC Asian Cup qualification
10	4 February 2014	Jalan Besar Stadium, Kallang, Singapore	Jordan	1-3 (lost)	2015 AFC Asian Cup qualification
11	5 March 2014	Sultan Qaboos Sports Complex, Muscat, Oman	Oman	1-3 (lost)	2015 AFC Asian Cup qualification
12	7 November 2014	Bahrain National Stadium, Manama, Bahrain	Bahrain	0-2 (lost)	Friendly
13	23 November 2014	National Stadium, Kallang, Singapore	Thailand	1-2 (lost)	2014 AFF Suzuki Cup
14	29 November 2014	National Stadium, Kallang, Singapore	Malaysia	1-3 (lost)	2014 AFF Suzuki Cup
15	26 March 2015	80th Birthday Anniversary Stadium, Nakhon Ratchasima, Thailand	Thailand	0-2 (lost)	Friendly
16	31 March 2015	Jalan Besar Stadium, Kallang, Singapore	Guam	2-2 (draw)	Friendly
17	28 August 2015	Jassim Bin Hamad Stadium, Doha, Qatar	Qatar	0-4 (lost)	Friendly
18	3 September 2015	Sultan Qaboos Sports Complex, Muscat, Oman	Syria	0-1 (lost)	2018 FIFA World Cup qualification – AFC second round
19	8 October 2015	Jalan Besar Stadium, Kallang, Singapore	Afghanistan	1-0 (won)	2018 FIFA World Cup qualification – AFC second round
20	13 October 2015	Jalan Besar Stadium, Kallang, Singapore	Cambodia	2-1 (won)	2018 FIFA World Cup qualification – AFC second round
21	12 November 2015	Jalan Besar Stadium, Kallang, Singapore	Japan	0-3 (lost)	2018 FIFA World Cup qualification – AFC second round
22	17 November 2015	Jalan Besar Stadium, Kallang, Singapore	Syria	1-2 (lost)	2018 FIFA World Cup qualification – AFC second round
23	24 March 2016	Jalan Besar Stadium, Kallang, Singapore	Myanmar	2-1 (won)	Friendly
24	29 March 2016	Takhti Stadium (Tehran), Tehran, Iran	Afghanistan	2-1 (won)	2018 FIFA World Cup qualification – AFC second round
25	28 July 2016	Phnom Penh Olympic Stadium, Phnom Penh, Cambodia	Cambodia	1-2 (lost)	Friendly
26	1 September 2016	Bahrain National Stadium, Manama, Bahrain	Bahrain	1-3 (lost)	Friendly
27	11 October 2016	Mong Kok Stadium, Mongkok, Hong Kong	Hong Kong	0-2 (lost)	Friendly
28	9 November 2016	Tuanku Abdul Rahman Stadium, Negeri Sembilan, Malaysia	Syria	0-2 (lost)	Friendly
29	13 November 2016	Bishan Stadium, Bishan, Singapore	Cambodia	1-0 (won)	Friendly
30	19 November 2016	Philippine Sports Stadium, Bocaue, Philippines	Philippines	0-0 (draw)	2016 AFF Suzuki Cup
31	22 November 2016	Philippine Sports Stadium, Bocaue, Philippines	Thailand	0-1 (lost)	2016 AFF Suzuki Cup
32	25 November 2016	Rizal Memorial Stadium, Manila, Philippines	Indonesia	1-2 (lost)	2016 AFF Suzuki Cup
33	23 March 2017	Al Ahly SC Stadium, Doha, Qatar	Afghanistan	1-2 (lost)	Friendly
34	28 March 2017	Bahrain National Stadium, Riffa, Bahrain	Bahrain	0-0 (draw)	2019 AFC Asian Cup qualification – third round
35	10 June 2017	Jalan Besar Stadium, Kallang, Singapore	Chinese Taipei	1-2 (lost)	2019 AFC Asian Cup qualification – third round
36	13 June 2017	Singapore Sports Hub, Kallang, Singapore	Argentina	0-6 (lost)	Friendly
37	31 August 2017	Jalan Besar Stadium, Kallang, Singapore	Hong Kong	1-1 (draw)	Friendly
38	5 September 2017	Jalan Besar Stadium, Kallang, Singapore	Turkmenistan	1-1 (draw)	2019 AFC Asian Cup qualification – third round
39	23 March 2018	Singapore Sports Hub, Kallang, Singapore	Maldives	3-2 (won)	Friendly
40	27 March 2018	Taipei Stadium, Taipei, Taiwan	Chinese Taipei	0-1 (lost)	2019 AFC Asian Cup qualification – third round
41	7 September 2018	Bishan Stadium, Bishan, Singapore	Mauritius	1-1 (draw)	Friendly
42	11 September 2018	Bishan Stadium, Bishan, Singapore	Fiji	2-0 (won)	Friendly
43	12 October 2018	Bishan Stadium, Bishan, Singapore	Mongolia	2-0 (won)	Friendly
44	9 November 2018	Singapore Sports Hub, Kallang, Singapore	Indonesia	1-0 (won)	2018 AFF Championship
45	13 November 2018	Panaad Stadium, Bacolod, Philippines	Philippines	0-1 (lost)	2018 AFF Championship
46	21 November 2018	Singapore Sports Hub, Kallang, Singapore	Timor-Leste	6-1 (won)	2018 AFF Championship
47	25 November 2018	Rajamangala Stadium, Bangkok, Thailand	Thailand	0-3 (lost)	2018 AFF Championship
48	8 June 2019	Singapore Sports Hub, Kallang, Singapore	Solomon Islands	4-3 (won)	Friendly
49	11 June 2019	Singapore Sports Hub, Kallang, Singapore	Myanmar	1-2 (lost)	Friendly
50	5 Sept 2019	National Stadium, Kallang, Singapore	Yemen	2-2 (draw)	2022 FIFA World Cup qualification – AFC second round
51	10 Sept 2019	Jalan Besar Stadium, Kallang, Singapore	Palestine	2-1 (won)	2022 FIFA World Cup qualification – AFC second round
52	3 June 2021	King Fahd International Stadium, Riyadh, Saudi Arabia	Palestine	0-4 (lost)	2022 FIFA World Cup qualification – AFC second round
55	5 December 2021	National Stadium, Kallang, Singapore	Myanmar	3-0(won)	2020 AFF Championship
56	8 December 2021	National Stadium, Kallang, Singapore	Philippines	2-1(won)	2020 AFF Championship
57	14 December 2021	National Stadium, Kallang, Singapore	Timor-Leste	2-0(won)	2020 AFF Championship
58	18 December 2021	National Stadium, Kallang, Singapore	Thailand	0-2(lost)	2020 AFF Championship
59	17 December 2022	Jalan Besar Stadium, Kallang, Singapore	Maldives	3-2(lost)	2020 AFF Championship
60	24 December 2022	Jalan Besar Stadium, Kallang, Singapore	Myanmar	3-2(won)	2022 AFF Championship
63	16 June 2023	National Stadium, Singapore	Papua New Guinea	2-2	Friendly

=== International goals ===
Scores and results list Singapore's goal tally first.

No	Date	Venue	Opponent	Score	Result	Competition
1.	5 September 2017	Jalan Besar Stadium, Kallang, Singapore	Turkmenistan	1–0	1–1	2019 AFC Asian Cup qualification
2.	23 March 2018	National Stadium, Kallang, Singapore	Maldives	3–1	3–2	Friendly
3.	10 September 2019	Jalan Besar Stadium, Kallang, Singapore	Palestine	1–0	2–1	2022 FIFA World Cup qualification
4.	14 December 2021	National Stadium, Kallang, Singapore	Timor-Leste	2–0	2–0	2020 AFF Championship

=== U19 International caps ===
No	Date	Venue	Opponent	Result	Competition
1	7 November 2009	Jalak Harupat Stadium, Bandung, Indonesia	Indonesia	1-0 (won)	2010 AFC U-19 Championship qualification
2	9 November 2009	Jalak Harupat Stadium, Bandung, Indonesia	Hong Kong	1-2 (lost)	2010 AFC U-19 Championship qualification
3	12 November 2009	Jalak Harupat Stadium, Bandung, Indonesia	Australia	0-8 (lost)	2010 AFC U-19 Championship qualification
4	14 November 2009	Jalak Harupat Stadium, Bandung, Indonesia	Japan	0-2 (lost)	2010 AFC U-19 Championship qualification
5	17 November 2009	Jalak Harupat Stadium, Bandung, Indonesia	Chinese Taipei	3-1 (won)	2010 AFC U-19 Championship qualification

== Honours ==
=== Club ===
LionsXII

- Malaysia Super League: 2013
- Malaysia FA Cup: 2015

Kedah

- Malaysia FA Cup: 2019
- Malaysia Super League Runners-up: 2020
- Malaysia Cup Runners-up: 2019

=== Individual ===
- Malaysia Super League Team of the Season: 2019
