= AFF Player of the Year =

ASEAN Football Federation award

The AFF Player of the Year is an association football award presented to the best footballer in ASEAN region. The inaugural award was launched in 2013 and run every 2 year.

== Winner (Men) ==
| Year | Name | Club |
|---|---|---|
| 2013 | (Singapore) Shahril Ishak | (Singapore) LionsXII |
| 2015 | (Thailand) Chanathip Songkrasin | (Thailand) BEC Tero Sasana |
| 2017 | (Thailand) Chanathip Songkrasin | (Thailand) Muangthong United |
| 2019 | (Vietnam) Nguyen Quang Hai | (Vietnam) Hanoi FC |

== Winner (Women) ==
| Year | Name | Club |
|---|---|---|
| 2013 | (Vietnam) Dang Thi Kieu Trinh | (Vietnam) Hồ Chí Minh City I W.F.C. |
| 2015 | (Thailand) Nisa Romyen | (Thailand) North Bangkok University FC |
| 2017 | (Thailand) Waraporn Boonsing | (Thailand) BG Bandit Asia |
| 2019 | (Thailand) Pitsamai Sornsai | (Thailand) Chonburi Sport School |
