= Madhu Mohana =

Singaporean footballer (born 1991)

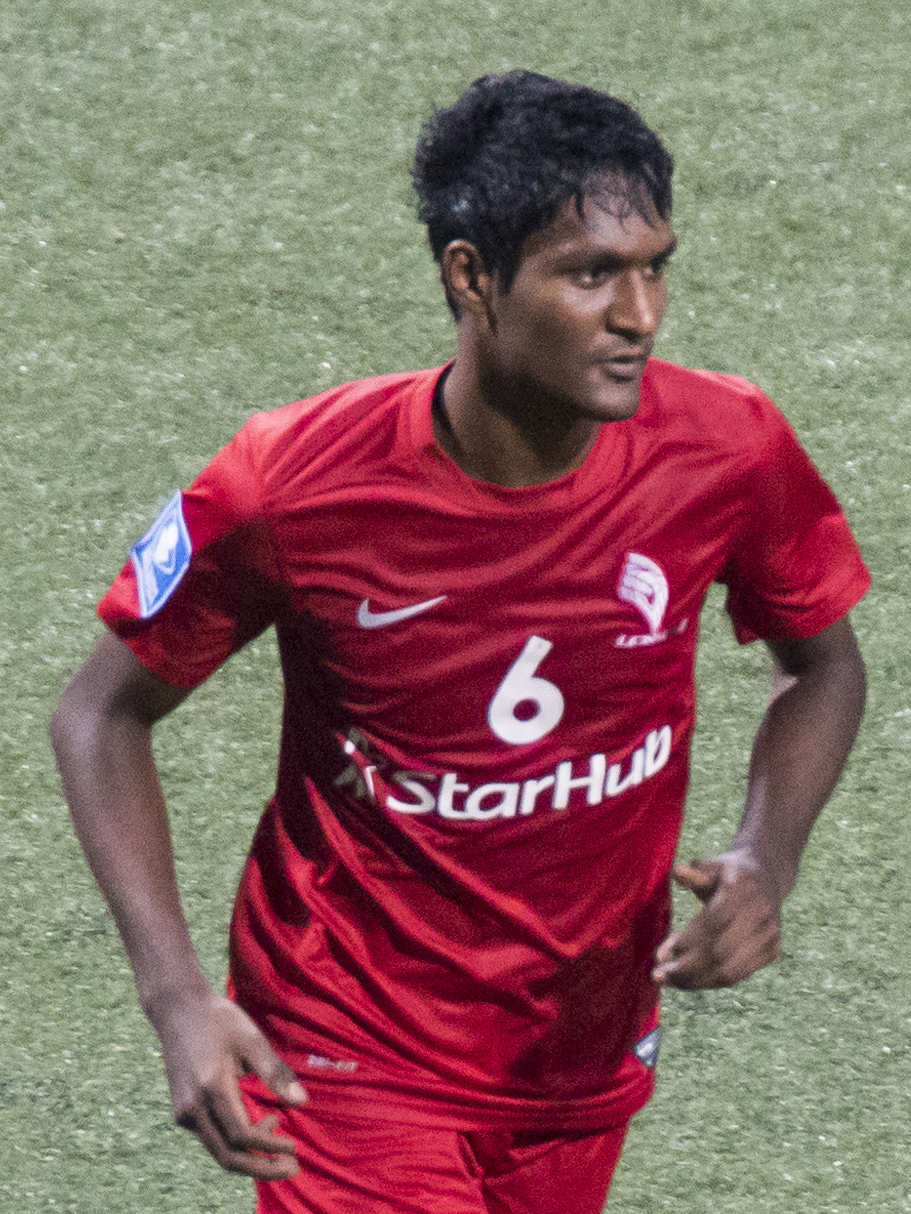
- Madhu in 2013

Personal information
- Full name: Madhu M. Mohana
- Date of birth: 6 March 1991 (age 35)
- Place of birth: Singapore
- Height: 1.86 m (6 ft 1 in)
- Positions: Centre-back; right-back

Team information
- Current team: Balestier Khalsa
- Number: 6

Youth career
- National Football Academy

Senior career*
| Years | Team | Apps | (Gls) |
| 2009–2010 | Young Lions | 24 | (1) |
| 2011 | Woodlands Wellington | 26 | (0) |
| 2012–2015 | LionsXII | 48 | (2) |
| 2016 | Warriors | 18 | (0) |
| 2017 | Tampines Rovers | 17 | (1) |
| 2018 | Negeri Sembilan | 0 | (0) |
| 2018–2021 | Tampines Rovers | 72 | (4) |
| 2022– | Balestier Khalsa | 83 | (7) |

International career^{‡}
| 2012 | Singapore U22 | 4 | (1) |
| 2013–2021 | Singapore | 33 | (0) |
Medal record
Men's football
Representing Singapore
Sea Games
| Bronze medal – third place | Vientiane 2009 | Football |
| Bronze medal – third place | Naypyidaw 2013 | Football |
- * Club domestic league appearances and goals as of 15 May 2026 ‡ National team caps and goals as of 11 June 2021

Madhu M. Mohana (born 6 March 1991) is a Singaporean professional footballer who plays as a right-back or centre-back for Balestier Khalsa. He is known for his long throw-ins.

== Education ==
Madhu graduated from the Singapore Sports School in 2007. He also studied a sports science and coaching diploma course at the International Sports Academy (ISA) and earned a scholarship for a sports management degree there.

== Football career ==
=== Club career ===
Madhu began his football career with Under-23 side Young Lions in the S.League in 2009. He was one of the Young Lions players involved in an on-pitch fight with Beijing Guoan Talent players in their S.League match on 7 September 2010. He was charged by the Football Association of Singapore for gross misconduct and bringing the game into disrepute and was banned for four months and fined S$1,000 for his part in the brawl. Madhu signed with Woodlands Wellington for the 2011 S.League season.

In late 2011, it was announced that Madhu was selected to be part of the new LionsXII team competing in the Malaysia Super League. After the LionsXII disbanded in 2015, Madhu signed for Warriors for the 2016 S.League campaign. On 27 May 2016, he scored his first goal for Warriors FC against Geylang International FC in the RHB Singapore Cup.

In 2017, Madhu joined Tampines Rovers. He was released by the team prior to the start of season.

In early 2018, Madhu signed for Negeri Sembilan F.A., but he was again released by the team days before the start of 2018 Malaysia Super League season. Madhu re-signed with Tampines Rovers in March the same year. He was released by Tampines Rovers at the end of the 2021 season. He was offered contracts by Singapore Premier League (SPL) clubs and also Thai League 2 clubs but rejected them.

In April 2022, Madhu trained with SPL club Balestier Khalsa and subsequently signed with Balestier in June.

== International career ==
Madhu was called up to the Singapore U22 squad which played in the 2013 AFC U-22 Asian Cup qualifiers. He made four appearances during the qualifying round and scored a goal against Timor-Leste.

Madhu was handed his international debut against Laos on 10 October 2013, starting as the team's right-back.

== Personal life ==
In 2022, Madhu started selling sunglasses via his own business, MadShades.

=== Coaching career ===
In 2022, Madhu started a personalised football mentoring service MadKicks.

== Career statistics ==
=== Club ===
As of 15 May 2026.

| Club | Season | S.League | | Singapore Cup | | Singapore League Cup | | Asia | | Total | |
| Club | Season | Apps | Goals | Apps | Goals | Apps | Goals | Apps | Goals | Apps | Goals |
|---|---|---|---|---|---|---|---|---|---|---|---|
| Young Lions | 2009 | 10 | 1 | 0 | 0 | 0 | 0 | — | | 10 | 1 |
| Young Lions | 2010 | 14 | 0 | 1 | 0 | 0 | 0 | — | | 15 | 0 |
| Young Lions | Total | 24 | 1 | 1 | 0 | 0 | 0 | 0 | 0 | 25 | 1 |
| Woodlands Wellington | 2011 | 26 | 0 | 0 | 0 | 1 | 0 | — | | 27 | 0 |
| Woodlands Wellington | Total | 26 | 0 | 0 | 0 | 1 | 0 | 0 | 0 | 27 | 0 |
| Club | Season | Malaysia Super League | | Malaysia FA Cup | | Malaysia Cup | | Asia | | Total | |
| LionsXII | 2012 | 11 | 0 | 4 | 1 | 2 | 0 | — | | 17 | 1 |
| LionsXII | 2013 | 4 | 0 | 0 | 0 | 3 | 1 | — | | 7 | 1 |
| LionsXII | 2014 | 12 | 0 | 2 | 0 | 0 | 0 | — | | 14 | 0 |
| LionsXII | 2015 | 21 | 2 | 7 | 1 | 8 | 0 | — | | 36 | 3 |
| LionsXII | Total | 48 | 2 | 13 | 2 | 13 | 1 | 0 | 0 | 74 | 5 |
| Club | Season | S.League | | Singapore Cup | | Singapore League Cup | | Asia | | Total | |
| Warriors | 2016 | 18 | 0 | 1 | 1 | 0 | 0 | — | | 19 | 1 |
| Warriors | Total | 18 | 0 | 1 | 1 | 0 | 0 | 0 | 0 | 19 | 1 |
| Tampines Rovers | 2017 | 17 | 1 | 2 | 0 | 0 | 0 | 6 | 0 | 25 | 1 |
| Tampines Rovers | Total | 17 | 1 | 2 | 0 | 0 | 0 | 6 | 0 | 25 | 1 |
| Club | Season | Malaysia Super League | | Malaysia FA Cup | | Malaysia Cup | | Asia | | Total | |
| Negeri Sembilan FA | 2018 | 0 | 0 | 0 | 0 | 0 | 0 | — | | 0 | 0 |
| Negeri Sembilan FA | Total | 0 | 0 | 0 | 0 | 0 | 0 | 0 | 0 | 0 | 0 |
| Club | Season | S.League | | Singapore Cup | | Singapore Community Shield | | Asia | | Total | |
| Tampines Rovers | 2018 | 19 | 1 | 2 | 0 | 0 | 0 | 0 | 0 | 21 | 1 |
| Tampines Rovers | 2019 | 24 | 0 | 6 | 0 | 0 | 0 | 5 | 0 | 35 | 0 |
| Tampines Rovers | 2020 | 12 | 1 | 0 | 0 | 1 | 0 | 3 | 0 | 16 | 1 |
| Tampines Rovers | 2021 | 17 | 2 | 0 | 0 | 0 | 0 | 5 | 0 | 22 | 2 |
| Tampines Rovers | Total | 72 | 4 | 8 | 0 | 1 | 0 | 13 | 0 | 94 | 4 |
| Balestier Khalsa | 2022 | 17 | 0 | 6 | 0 | 0 | 0 | 0 | 0 | 23 | 0 |
| Balestier Khalsa | 2023 | 21 | 3 | 3 | 0 | 0 | 0 | 0 | 0 | 24 | 3 |
| Balestier Khalsa | 2024–25 | 27 | 3 | 4 | 0 | 0 | 0 | 0 | 0 | 31 | 3 |
| Balestier Khalsa | 2025–26 | 18 | 1 | 6 | 0 | 0 | 0 | 0 | 0 | 24 | 1 |
| Balestier Khalsa | Total | 83 | 7 | 19 | 0 | 0 | 0 | 0 | 0 | 102 | 7 |
| Career Total | | 238 | 15 | 44 | 3 | 15 | 1 | 19 | 0 | 316 | 19 |

- Young Lions and LionsXII are ineligible for qualification to AFC competitions in their respective leagues.

=== International ===
As of 5 March 2014

Singapore national team
| Year | Apps | Goals |
|---|---|---|
| 2013 | 2 | 0 |
| 2014 | 0 | 0 |
| 2015 | 10 | 0 |
| 2016 | 9 | 0 |
| 2017 | 7 | 0 |
| Total | 28 | 0 |

== Honours ==
=== Club ===
LionsXII

- Malaysia Super League: 2013
- Malaysia FA Cup: 2015

Tampines Rovers

- Singapore Cup: 2019
- Singapore Community Shield: 2020
