= Shahril Ishak =

Singaporean footballer

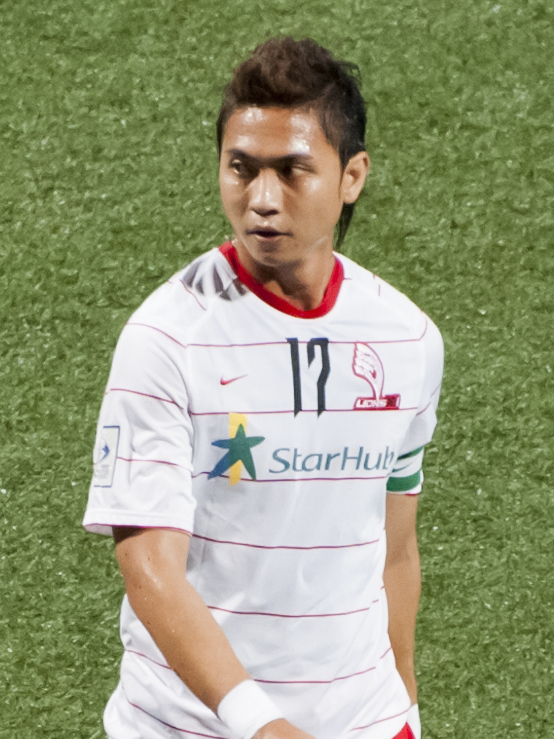
- Shahril playing for LionsXII in 2012

Personal information
- Full name: Mohammad Shahril bin Ishak
- Date of birth: 23 January 1984 (age 42)
- Place of birth: Singapore
- Height: 1.73 m (5 ft 8 in)
- Positions: Midfielder; forward

Team information
- Current team: Lion City Sailors (assistant coach)

Youth career
- 2000–2002: National Football Academy

Senior career*
Years	Team	Apps	(Gls)
2003–2006	Young Lions	101	(20)
2007–2010	Home United	98	(42)
2011	Persib Bandung	7	(1)
2012	Medan Chiefs	32	(5)
2012–2013	LionsXII	40	(18)
2013–2016	Johor Darul Ta'zim II	75	(23)
2017	Warriors	24	(10)
2018–2021	Lion City Sailors	48	(23)
2021–2022	Hougang United	8	(0)
Total		539	(190)

International career
2003–2018	Singapore	145	(15)
Medal record
Men's football
Representing Singapore
Sea Games
Bronze medal – third place	Sea Games 2007	Football
Asean Football Championship
Winner	AFF Suzuki Cup 2004	2004
Winner	AFF Suzuki Cup 2007	2007
Winner	AFF Suzuki Cup 2012	2012
- * Club domestic league appearances and goals

Mohammad Shahril bin Ishak (born 23 January 1984) is a Singaporean former professional footballer who played as a midfielder or forward. A former captain of the Singapore national team, he had led the country to win three titles in the AFF Championship in 2004, 2007, 2012.

Shahril was also named the Most Valuable Player during the 2012 AFF Championship and the AFF Player of the Year award in 2013. He was also included in the ASEAN Football Federation Best XI in 2013. He was also S.League's Player of the Year in 2010 and was included in the 2018 Singapore Premier League's Team of the Year.

== Club career ==
Along with Baihakki Khaizan, Hassan Sunny and Khairul Amri, Shahril was in the pioneer batch of the National Football Academy in 2000.

=== Young Lions ===
Shahril joined the newly created Young Lions ahead of the 2003 S.League season and soon made his international debut. After four seasons, Shahril left the Young Lions in 2007 to join Home United.

=== Home United ===
Shahril made his Home United debut in at the start of the 2007 season. He played his final game for Home United on 21 September 2010, scoring two crucial goals against title rivals Tampines Rovers. He then left for Indonesia with five games remaining in the S.League season. He finished his last season in Home United with 17 goals to his name and was the third highest scorer during the 2010 S.League season. He also won the 2010 S.League Player of the Year award.

=== Persib Bandung ===
In 2010, Shahril signed a 1-year contract with Indonesian side, Persib Bandung, along with his fellow Singapore national football team player, Baihakki Khaizan.

=== Medan Chiefs ===
In February 2011, Shahril signed a one-year deal worth $400,000 with Liga Primer Indonesia side, Medan Chiefs. He then went on to score 8 league goals in 32 matches for Medan Chiefs.

=== LionsXII ===
Shahril returned to Singapore with newly formed club side LionsXII in December 2011. During his stint at LionsXII, he won the 2013 Malaysia Super League title in his second season as well as scoring 17 goals in 34 appearances, finishing as the club top scorer in the 2013 season.

=== Johor Darul Ta'zim II ===
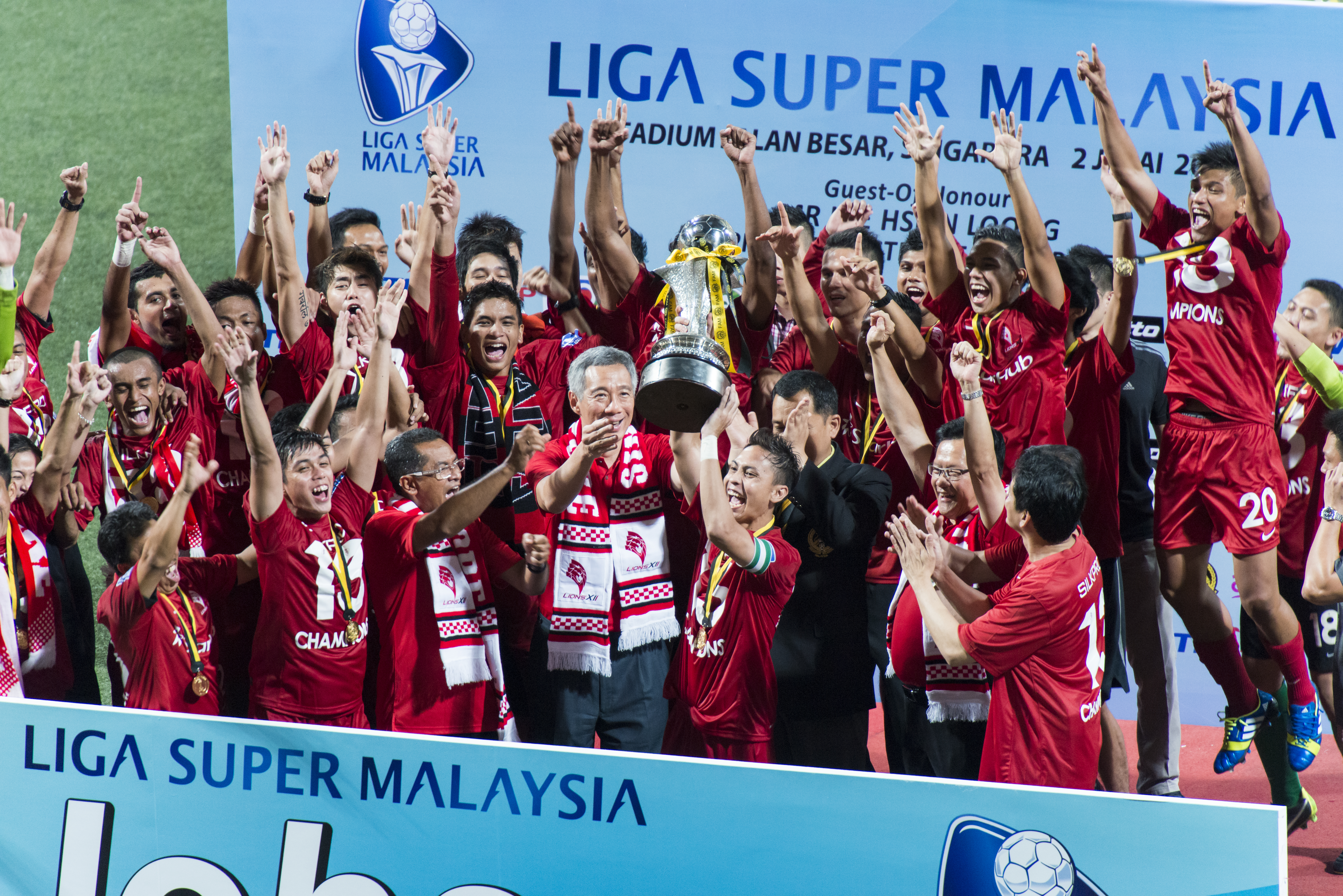
Shahril Ishak as LionsXII captain receiving the 2013 Malaysia Super League trophy from Prime Minister, Lee Hsien Loong after beating FELDA United at the Jalan Besar Stadium.

Shahril signed a 4-year contract at the end of the 2013 Malaysia Super League by joining Malaysia Premier League club, Johor Darul Ta'zim II. He was given the number 17 shirt upon his arrival to the club. He was appointed as the captain for his new club in the 2014 Malaysia Premier League. He was converted back to a centre midfielder/play-maker role and led his new club to a 5th placing position, finishing the season with 7 goals and 8 assists for his new team. He led Johor Darul Ta'zim II for the 2015 Malaysia Premier League as the captain again, and led his club to a 5th placing position again, finishing the season with 5 goals and 6 assists. In total, Shahril scored 23 goals in 75 appearances for JDT II between 2014 and 2016.

=== Warriors FC ===
Sharil returned to Singapore to play in the S.League with Warriors FC for the 2017 S.League campaign together with Baihakki Khaizan. He scored his first goal for the club in a 4–3 win over the Garena Young Lions and notched his first brace for the club in a 2–2 draw with Home United, scoring both goals in the final 9 minutes of the match, extending the Warriors' unbeaten run at the start of the season to 6 games. He scored a further two goals in the Warriors' tenth league game of the season, sealing a 2–0 win over Geylang International to end a wretched two months spell for his club, where they only won once and was dumped out of the Singapore Cup. Shahril had a great season despite his advancing years, scoring 1/3 of his team's goals (11) and playing in all 24 league games, starting 23 of them.

=== Return to Home United ===
Sharil returned to Home United for the inaugural 2018 Singapore Premier League season, replacing Khairul Nizam who had moved in the other direction to Warriors FC. In 2020, Shahril scored appeared nine times and scored three in all club competitions.

=== Hougang United ===
After 4 season with his previous club, Sharil joined Hougang United in January 2021. He helped them win the 2022 Singapore Cup, their first ever piece of silverware in the club history.

On 21 February 2023, Sharil announced his retirement from football at age of 39.

== Managerial career ==
Sharil became the assistant coach of Singapore Premier League club Lion City Sailors.

== International career ==
Singapore's most natural creative midfielder to emerge in recent years, Shahril made his international debut at 19 years old against Maldives on 4 March 2003.

With winger Ridhuan Muhammad, defender Baihakki Khaizan and keeper Hassan Sunny, he was part of the "NFA Gang of Four", the quartet which had played together since their early teenage years and earned senior international honours in 2003.

He has been employed in various positions across the midfield by coach Radojko Avramović, but Shahril staked a strong claim for an influential central role with a series of convincing performances there in the second half of 2004.

On 28 January 2004, Shahril scored his first international goal against Norway in a friendly match which resulted in a 2-5 loss.

He played a major role in the victory in the 2004 AFF Championship and also the 2007 AFF Championship, He was also part of the 2005 SEA Games squad and the 2006 Asian Games.

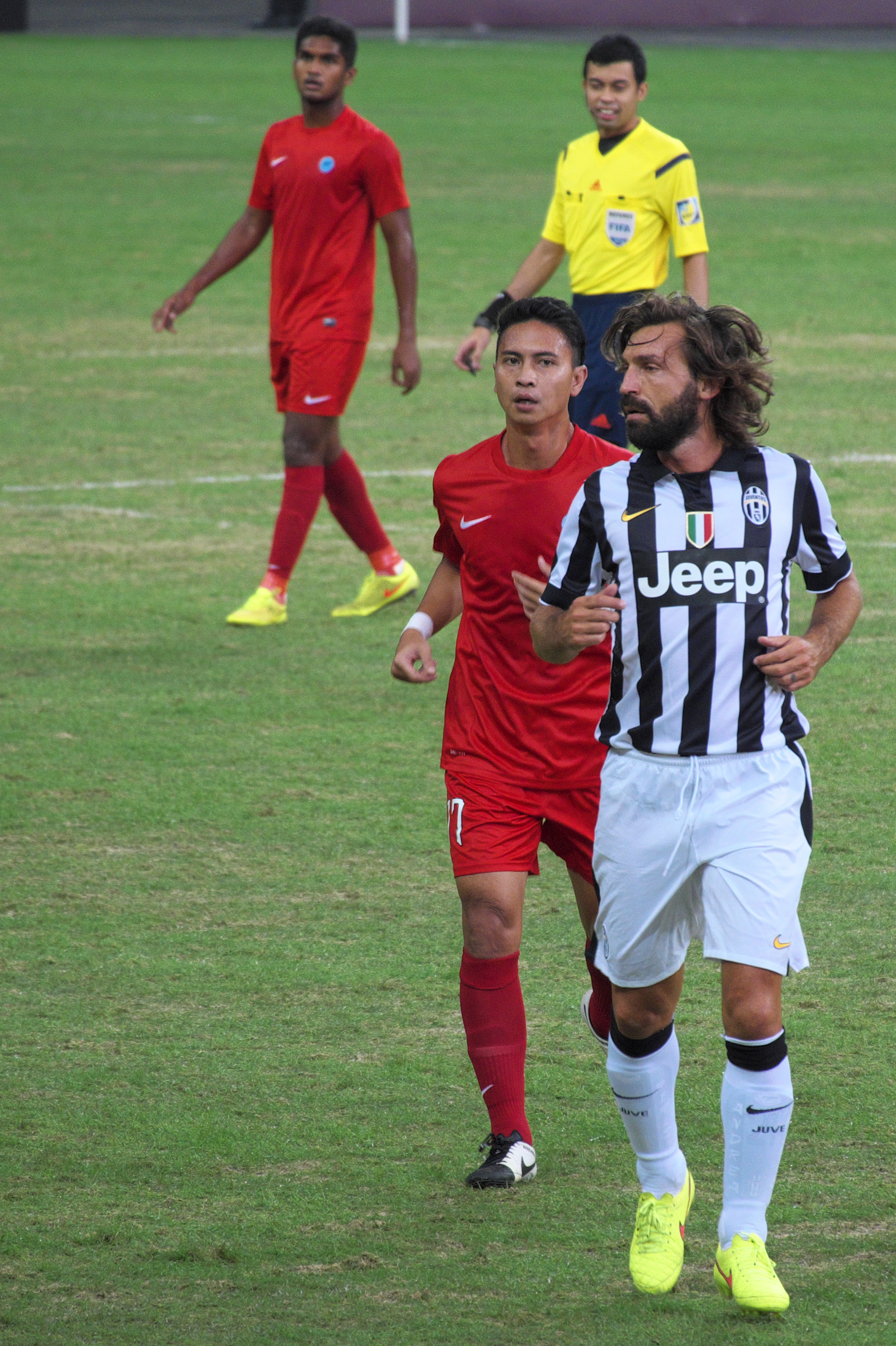
Shahril Ishak marking Juventus star, Andrea Pirlo in a pre-season friendly in August 2014.

He was part of the Singapore Under-23 team that took part in the 2007 Southeast Asian Games in Korat, Thailand that won a bronze medal.

Capped for Singapore at senior, U23, U18 and U16 levels.

In August 2010 Shahril was revealed as the new captain of the national team, and led the Lions for the AFF Suzuki Cup in December.

On 24 February 2011, Shahrill Ishak converted a penalty into a goal in a 2–2 draw against Azerbaijan national football team.

Shahril is an inductee of the FIFA Century Club.

As captain, he was instrumental in Singapore's 2012 AFF Championship win, scoring 4 goals in 7 appearances to help the Lions win their 4th title.

=== Singapore selection ===
Shahril was selected as part of the Singapore Selection squad for The Sultan of Selangor's Cup to be held on 6 May 2017.

== Personal life ==
Shahril is the founder of inlovebytns, a clothing brand jointly managed with his wife, Nur Hidayah, that was started in late 2014. The business began in 2013 as a streetwear label called The Number Seventeen – a reference to Shahril's jersey number and TNS for short. All TNS apparel are designed by Shahril.

== Career statistics ==
=== Club ===
As of match played 10 October 2021. Caps and goals may not be correct.

Club	Season	S.League		Singapore Cup		Singapore League Cup		Asia		Total	
Club	Season	Apps	Goals	Apps	Goals	Apps	Goals	Apps	Goals	Apps	Goals
Young Lions	2003	??	??	-	-	-	-	—		??	??
Young Lions	2004	??	??	-	-	-	-	—		??	??
Young Lions	2005	??	??	-	-	-	-	—		??	??
Young Lions	2006	??	??	-	-	-	-	—		??	??
Young Lions	Total	101	20	0	0	0	0	0	0	101	20
Home United	2007	??	??	-	-	-	-	—		??	??
Home United	2008	??	8	-	-	-	-	—		??	8
Home United	2009	23	0	-	-	-	-	—		23	0
Home United	2010	29	17	1	0	-	-	—		30	17
Home United	Total	98	42	1	0	0	0	0	0	99	42
Club	Season	Indonesia Super League		Indonesia FA Cup		Indonesia League Cup		Asia		Total	
Persib Bandung	2010–2011	11	0	-	-	-	-	—		11	0
Persib Bandung	Total	11	0	0	0	0	0	0	0	11	0
Medan Chiefs	2011–2012	32	8	-	-	-	-	—		32	8
Medan Chiefs	Total	32	8	0	0	0	0	0	0	32	8
Club	Season	Malaysia Super League		Malaysia FA Cup		Malaysia Cup		Asia		Total	
LionsXII	2012	19	10	3	1	10	3	—		32	14
LionsXII	2013	21	8	1	0	6	1	—		28	9
LionsXII	Total	40	18	4	1	16	4	0	0	60	23
Johor Darul Ta'zim II	2014	??	??	??	??	??	??	—		??	??
Johor Darul Ta'zim II	2015	??	??	??	??	??	??	—		??	??
Johor Darul Ta'zim II	2016	??	??	??	??	??	??	—		??	??
Johor Darul Ta'zim II	Total	75	23	0	0	0	0	0	0	75	23
Club	Season	S.League		Singapore Cup		Singapore League Cup		Asia		Total	
Warriors	2017	24	10	1	0	4	4	0	0	29	14
Warriors	Total	24	10	1	0	4	4	0	0	29	14
Home United	2018	23	13	5	2	0	0	12	5	40	19
Home United	2019	16	7	1	0	0	0	3	0	20	7
Home United	Total	39	20	6	2	0	0	15	5	60	26
Lion City Sailors	2020	9	3	0	0	0	0	0	0	9	3
Lion City Sailors	Total	9	3	0	0	0	0	0	0	9	3
Hougang United	2021	8	0	0	0	0	0	0	0	8	0
Hougang United	2022	0	0	0	0	0	0	0	0	0	0
Hougang United	Total	8	0	0	0	0	0	0	0	8	0
Career total		437	145	11	3	16	4	15	5	479	167

- Young Lions and LionsXII are ineligible for qualification to AFC competitions in their respective leagues.

=== International ===
Scores and results list Singapore's goal tally first.

List of international goals scored by Shahril Ishak
No.	Date	Venue	Opponent	Score	Result	Competition
1	28 January 2004	National Stadium, Kallang, Singapore	Norway	2–2	2–5	Friendly
2	29 December 2004	KLFA Stadium, Kuala Lumpur, Malaysia	Myanmar	4–2	4–3	2004 AFF Championship
3	11 October 2005	Olympic Stadium, Phnom Penh, Cambodia	Cambodia	1–0	2–0	Friendly
4	11 October 2005	Olympic Stadium, Phnom Penh, Cambodia	Cambodia	2–0	2–0	Friendly
5	15 January 2007	National Stadium, Kallang, Singapore	Laos	4–0	11–0	2007 AFF Championship
6	24 February 2012	The Sevens, Dubai, United Arab Emirates	Azerbaijan	1–2	2–2	Friendly
7	19 November 2012	Jurong West Stadium, Jurong, Singapore	Pakistan	3–0	4–0	Friendly
8	25 November 2012	Bukit Jalil National Stadium, Kuala Lumpur, Malaysia	Malaysia	1–0	3–0	2012 AFF Championship
9	25 November 2012	Bukit Jalil National Stadium, Kuala Lumpur, Malaysia	Malaysia	2–0	3–0	2012 AFF Championship
10	1 December 2012	Shah Alam Stadium, Selangor, Malaysia	Laos	1–2	4–3	2012 AFF Championship
11	1 December 2012	Shah Alam Stadium, Selangor, Malaysia	Laos	2–2	4–3	2012 AFF Championship
12	5 March 2014	Sultan Qaboos Sports Complex, Muscat, Oman	Oman	1–3	1–3	2015 AFC Asian Cup qualification
13	10 October 2014	Mong Kok Stadium, Mong Kok, Hong Kong	Hong Kong	1–2	1–2	Friendly
14	17 November 2014	Yishun Stadium, Yishun, Singapore	Cambodia	3–2	4–2	Friendly
15	24 March 2016	Jalan Besar Stadium, Kallang, Singapore	Myanmar	1–0	2–1	Friendly

== Honours ==
=== Club ===
LionsXII

- Malaysia Super League: 2013

Hougang United

- Singapore Cup: 2022

=== International ===
Singapore

- AFF Championship: 2004, 2007, 2012
- Southeast Asian Games bronze medal: 2007

=== Individual ===
- S.League Player of the Year: 2010
- Tiger Beer Goal of the Year: 2010 (40', Home United vs SAFFC on 16 July)
- AFF Championship Most Valuable Player: 2012
- AFF Player of the Year (Men): 2013
- ASEAN Football Federation Best XI: 2013
- ASEAN All-Stars: 2014
- Singapore Premier League 'Team of the Year': 2018

== See also ==
- List of men's footballers with 100 or more international caps

== Notes ==
- International caps milestones

- 115th – Syria, 15 November 2013 "FIFA Century Club fact sheet" (PDF). FIFA. 11 December 2013. Archived from the original (PDF) on 21 May 2013.
- 117th – Oman, 5 March 2014 "FIFA Century Club fact sheet" (PDF). FIFA. 10 March 2014. Archived from the original (PDF) on 16 March 2014.

Sporting positions
Preceded by Noh Alam Shah	Singapore national team captain 2010–2018	Succeeded by Hariss Harun
