= Pravin Guanasagaran =

Singaporean footballer

Personal information
- Full name: Pravin Guanasagaran
- Date of birth: 12 January 1993 (age 33)
- Place of birth: Singapore
- Position: Midfielder

Team information
- Current team: Canning City SC

Youth career
- 2011: National Football Academy U18

Senior career*
Years	Team	Apps	(Gls)
2015	Garena Young Lions	4	(0)
- Canning City

International career^{‡}
2014–2015	Singapore U23	3	(0)
- * Club domestic league appearances and goals as of 03:35, 24 December 2017 (UTC) ‡ National team caps and goals as of 03:35, 24 November 2014 (UTC)

Pravin Guanasagaran (born 12 January 1993) is a Singaporean footballer who plays as a midfielder for Football West State League Division 1 club Canning City SC.

== Youth career ==
Pravin joined the National Football Academy U18 in 2011 before moving to Canning City SC.
