= Baihakki Khaizan =

Singaporean footballer

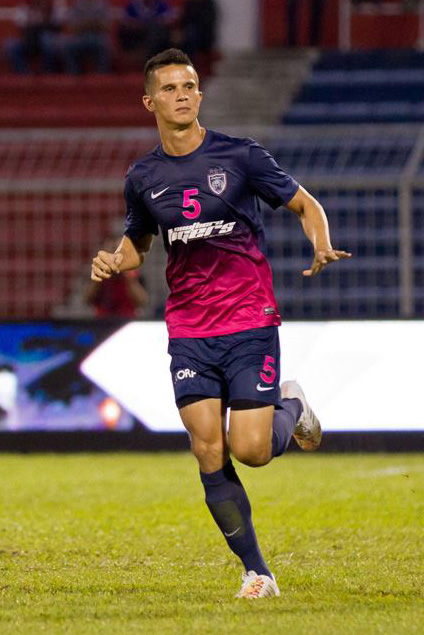
- Baihakki Khaizan playing against Home United in a friendly match on 11 January 2014.

Personal information
- Full name: Baihakki bin Khaizan
- Date of birth: 31 January 1984 (age 42)
- Place of birth: Singapore
- Height: 1.91 m (6 ft 3 in)
- Position: Defender

Team information
- Current team: Football Association of Singapore (Head of planning)

Youth career
- 2000–2002: National Football Academy

Senior career*
Years	Team	Apps	(Gls)
2003	Geylang United	20	(1)
2004–2007	Young Lions	98	(7)
2008–2009	Geylang United	46	(4)
2009–2010	Persija Jakarta	30	(0)
2010–2011	Persib Bandung	9	(0)
2011–2012	Medan Chiefs	20	(1)
2012–2013	LionsXII	31	(4)
2014	Johor Darul Ta'zim	10	(1)
2014	→ LionsXII (loan)	2	(0)
2015–2016	Johor Darul Ta'zim II	52	(3)
2017	Warriors	15	(0)
2018	Muangthong United	0	(0)
2018	→ Udon Thani (loan)	23	(1)
2019	Trat	26	(2)
2020	PT Prachuap	2	(0)
2020–2021	Tampines Rovers	28	(1)
Total		409	(25)

International career
2003–2021	Singapore	144	(5)
Medal record
Men's football
Representing Singapore
Sea Games
Bronze medal – third place	Nakhon Ratchasima 2007	Football
Asean Football Championship
Winner	Tiger Cup 2004	2004
Winner	AFF Championship 2007	2007
Winner	AFF Suzuki Cup 2012	2012
- * Club domestic league appearances and goals

Baihakki bin Khaizan (born 31 January 1984) is a Singaporean retired footballer who last played as a centre-back for Singapore Premier League club Tampines Rovers and the Singapore national team. Baihakki is known to be one of the best defenders in the Southeast Asia region during his time as a footballer. He has plied his career playing in Indonesia, Malaysia and Thailand.

Along with Khairul Amri, Shahril Ishak and Hassan Sunny, Baihakki was in the pioneer batch of the National Football Academy in 2000.

Baihakki is the first and only foreigner to win the FAM Football Awards 'Best Defender Award' in 2013 in which he won the 2013 Malaysia Super League with LionsXII. He has also won 3 AFF Championship with the Singapore national team and was included in the AFF Championship All-time XI in history.

== Club career ==
Baihakki is recognised as one of the best centre-backs in the region. In the National Football Academy age-group squads, he was noted for his 1.91 m stature, instinctive confidence and composure at the back. Signing on with Geylang United in 2003, Baihakki took the 2003 S.League Young Player of the Year award in his debut S.League season. After learning his craft alongside former Singapore international Lim Tong Hai, a player he considers a big influence.

=== Young Lions FC ===
In 2004, the defender then moved to Young Lions ahead of the 2004 S.League season and captained the team throughout the season. Baihakki nearly missed out playing for the 2007 S.League season after MINDEF refused to release him to play as he was serving National Service. However, he got the green light after a few games into the season.

=== Geylang United ===
In 2008, he returned to Geylang United. However, his army conscription clashed with his football career again, and thus he missed the first few games of the new season.

=== Persija Jakarta ===
In September 2009, Khaizan agreed terms with Indonesia Super League side, Persija Jakarta, along with his Singaporean compatriot, Mustafic Fahrudin to join them before the 2009–10 Indonesia Super League started in October. During his first season, he managed to score 3 goals in 39 appearances.

=== Persib Bandung ===
In a controversial decision, Baihakki left Persija Jakarta for fierce rivals, Persib Bandung at the end of the 2009-10 Indonesia Super League season. At Persib Bandung, he linked up with his Singaporean compatriot, Shahril Ishak, who also signed for the Indonesian club. Baihakki's stint at Persib was cut short as he was released from the club after 6 months.

=== Medan Chiefs ===
On 16 February 2011, Baihakki signed a two-year deal with Medan Chiefs worth approximately US$300,000, along with Shahril Ishak, who was also released by Persib.

=== LionsXII ===
In 2012, Baihakki returned to Singapore with newly formed team, LionsXII, that was competing in the Malaysia Super League. He scored their first ever goal in their league debut against Kelantan FA on 10 January 2012. Baihakki went on to win his first Malaysia Super League title with LionsXII during the 2013 Malaysia Super League season. In 2014, Baihakki signed a four-year contract with Malaysian Super League team, Johor Darul Takzim. After a series of unimpressive performances, he was de-registered from the squad on 18 April 2014 and replaced with Marcos Antonio Elias Santos. Baihakki rejoined LionsXII on loan in May 2014. As part of his release, he would not face former club Johor Darul Ta'zim in their upcoming league fixture.

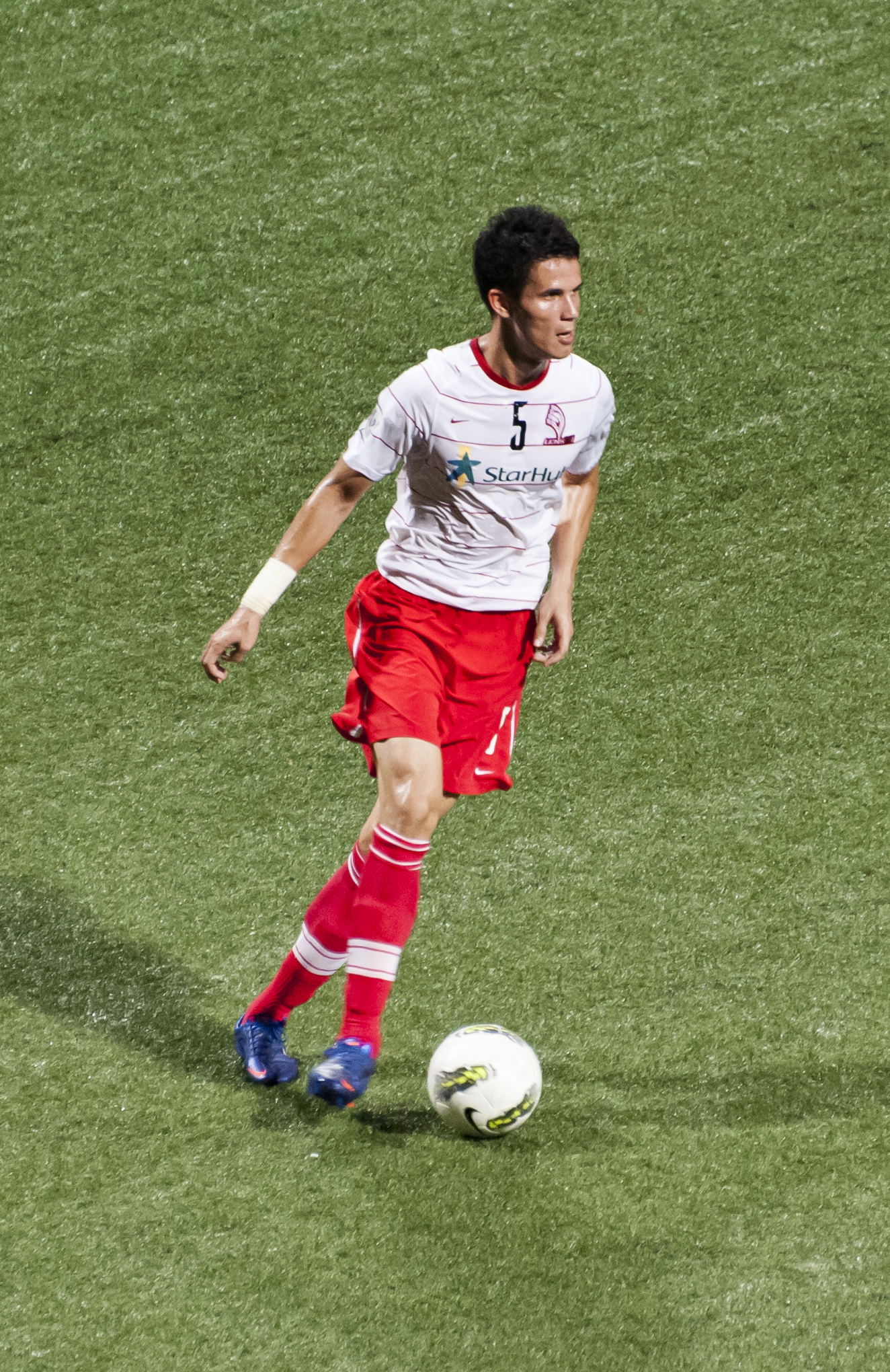
Baihakki featuring for LionsXII in a 2012 league match against Kuala Lumpur FA.

=== Johor Darul Ta'zim II F.C. ===
Baihakki returned to Malaysia and made his Johor Darul Ta'zim II debut in the 2015 Malaysia Premier League season. Baihakki joins Warriors FC to play in the S.League for the 2017 campaign together with the Singapore captain, Shahril Ishak. Following the end of the season, Baihakki was not offered a contract extension and was left without a club and was reportedly considering his options with offers from several clubs within the region. He went for a trial with Saudi Arabian second-tier side, Jeddah Club after he was set up by his agent while on an Umrah pilgrimage trip with his family. After impressing in a five day trial, Baihakki was offered a four month contract by the Saudi side until the end of the season.

=== Muangthong United ===
After declining to play in the Middle East, Baihakki was offered a contract to play with Kuala Lumpur FA. However, a last minute deal was offered to him to play in the Thai League 1 and on 26 January 2018, he signed a contract with 4 time-league winner, Muangthong United ahead of the 2018 season. After signing with Muangthong United, On 5 February 2018, Baihakki was immediately loaned out to Thai League 2 side, Udon Thani. He scored his first goal in a 3–0 victory against Thai Honda FC, becoming the first Singaporean to score in the Thai league.

=== Trat F.C. ===
On 11 January 2019, Baihakki signed a one-year deal with newly promoted club Thai League 1 club Trat. He has racked up two goals and an assist in his first 13 games for the club. On 3 January 2020, Baihakki signed for 2019 Thai League Cup winners PT Prachuap for the 2020 Thai League 1 season.

=== Tampines Rovers FC ===
After 2 years in Thailand, Baihakki returned to Singapore to inked an 18-month deal with Tampines Rovers on 14 June 2020. Under the terms of the contract, Baihakki would play for free this season, should the 2020 Singapore Premier League resume after being suspended due to the COVID-19 pandemic. On 5 December 2020, Baihaikki scored his first goal for the club in an Eastern Derby as he scored a header in the 80th minute of the match against his former club, Geylang International to levelled the score in a 1-1 draw at Our Tampines Hub.

On April 3, 2021 in a fixture against Hougang United at the Hougang Stadium, Baihakki was sent off after receiving a second yellow in the seventieth minute from a soft push on Tomoyuki Doi. The free-kick conceded by him was ultimately scored by Shafiq Ghani as Tampines went on to lose 5-1. On 25 June 2021, he make his AFC Champions League debut against 2020 J1 League runners-up, Gamba Osaka in which they lost the match 2-0. He went on to play all six of the group stage match against 2020 K League 1 champions and 2020 Korean FA Cup winners, Jeonbuk Hyundai Motors and Thailand club, Chiangrai United with all the match being played at the Lokomotiv Stadium in Tashkent, Uzbekistan.

On 1 February 2022, Baihakki announced his retirement from competitive football.

== International career ==
Baihakki made his debut for the Singapore against Hong Kong on 4 August 2003. On 15 December 2004, Baihaikki scored his first goal for his country in a 2-0 win against Cambodia in the 2004 AFF Championship.

Baihakki was part of the team that won the Tiger Cup in 2005 and the 2007 ASEAN Football Championship. Then captain of the Under-23 team, he led the Young Lions out for the 2005 Southeast Asian Games in Philippines and also won a bronze medal for the 2007 edition in Korat, Thailand. He lifted the Suzuki Cup in December 2012, after scoring the eventual winner in the first leg. Singapore went on to beat Thailand 3–1 on aggregate.

Baihakki reached his milestone 100th cap in a friendly match against China on 6 September 2013. He was inducted into the FIFA Century Club in December 2013. (Note: Baihakki earned his 104th cap against Syria on 15 October 2013.)

In March 2019, Baihakki announced his retirement from international football after amassing 134 caps for the Lions, but he came back from retirement for the 2022 World Cup Qualifiers. He played for the Lions in a 2–2 draw against Yemen on 5 September 2019. He played his last final match for Singapore on 11 June 2021 against Saudi Arabia at the King Saud University Stadium in Riyadh. Baihakki has amassed 142 caps for his country.

== Other ventures ==
Baihakki opened his interior design and renovation company in April 2013. He launched his second business, a spa, in March 2014.

After announcing his retirement on 1 February 2022, Baihakki also announced he had taken new roles with the Football Association of Singapore (FAS). He became the Lead of Special Projects and Ambassador with FAS in February 2022 until March 2023 where he was promoted to Head of Planning in the FAS Technical Division office.

== Personal life ==
Baihakki's father, Khaizan bin Muhammad, died when he was three. He has an elder sister and a younger brother.

Baihakki is married to Norfasarie Mohd Yahya, a Singaporean flight attendant, actress and singer. They had been engaged since 1 April 2007. He has two sons and two daughters.

Baihakki is featured in eFootball Pro Evolution Soccer 2020 alongside his Singapore teammate Hariss Harun. He will be the third Singaporean to be featured in a video game after Safuwan Baharudin in FIFA 15.

== Career statistics ==
=== Club ===
As of match played 10 Oct 2021. Caps and goals may not be correct.

Club	Season	S.League		Singapore Cup		Singapore League Cup		Asia		Total	
Club	Season	Apps	Goals	Apps	Goals	Apps	Goals	Apps	Goals	Apps	Goals
Geylang United	2003	20	1	-	-	-	-	—		20	1
Geylang United	Total	20	1	0	0	0	0	0	0	20	1
Young Lions	2004	??	??	-	-	-	-	—		??	??
Young Lions	2005	??	??	-	-	-	-	—		??	??
Young Lions	2006	??	??	-	-	-	-	—		??	??
Young Lions	2007	??	??	-	-	-	-	—		??	??
Young Lions	Total	98	7	0	0	0	0	0	0	98	7
Geylang United	2008	??	??	-	-	-	-	—		??	??
Geylang United	2009	??	??	-	-	-	-	—		??	??
Geylang United	Total	46	4	0	0	0	0	0	0	46	4
Club	Season	Indonesia Super League		Piala Indonesia		Indonesia League Cup		Asia		Total	
Persija Jakarta	2009–2010	30	0	-	-	-	-	—		30	0
Persija Jakarta	Total	30	0	0	0	0	0	0	0	30	0
Persib Bandung	2010–2011	9	0	-	-	-	-	—		9	0
Persib Bandung	Total	9	0	0	0	0	0	0	0	9	0
Medan Chiefs	2011–2012	20	1	-	-	-	-	—		20	1
Medan Chiefs	Total	20	1	0	0	0	0	0	0	20	1
Club	Season	Malaysia Super League		Malaysia FA Cup		Malaysia Cup		Asia		Total	
LionsXII	2012	16	2	0	0	10	0	—		26	2
LionsXII	2013	15	2	1	0	8	1	—		24	3
LionsXII	Total	31	4	1	0	18	1	0	0	50	5
Johor Darul Takzim	2014	10	1	-	-	-	-	—		10	1
Johor Darul Takzim	Total	10	1	0	0	0	0	0	0	10	1
LionsXII (loan)	2014	2	0	0	0	0	0	—		2	0
LionsXII (loan)	Total	2	0	0	0	0	0	0	0	2	0
Johor Darul Takzim II	2015	??	??	??	??	??	??	—		??	??
Johor Darul Takzim II	2016	??	??	1	0	??	??	—		1	0
Johor Darul Takzim II	Total	52	3	1	0	0	0	0	0	53	3
Club	Season	S.League		Singapore Cup		Singapore League Cup		Asia		Total	
Warriors	2017	20	0	3	0	1	0	0	0	24	0
Warriors	Total	20	0	3	0	1	0	0	0	24	0
Club	Season	Thai League 1		Thai FA Cup		Thai League Cup		Asia		Total	
Muangthong United	2018	0	0	0	0	0	0	—		0	0
Muangthong United	Total	0	0	0	0	0	0	0	0	0	0
Udon Thani F.C.	2018	0	0	0	0	0	0	—		0	0
Udon Thani F.C.	Total	0	0	0	0	0	0	0	0	0	0
Trat F.C.	2019	26	0	3	0	0	0	—		29	0
Trat F.C.	Total	0	0	0	0	0	0	0	0	0	0
Prachuap F.C.	2020	2	0	0	0	0	0	—		0	0
Prachuap F.C.	Total	0	0	0	0	0	0	0	0	0	0
Club	Season	S.League		Singapore Cup		Singapore League Cup		Asia		Total	
Tampines Rovers	2020	8	1	0	0	0	0	0	0	8	1
Tampines Rovers	2021	14	0	0	0	0	0	6	0	20	0
Tampines Rovers	Total	22	1	0	0	0	0	6	0	28	1
Career total		332	21	2	0	18	1	6	0	358	22

- Young Lions and LionsXII are ineligible for qualification to AFC competitions in their respective leagues.

=== International ===
Score and Result list Singapore's goal tally first

No.	Date	Venue	Opponent	Score	Result	Competition	Ref.
1.	15 December 2004	Lạch Tray Stadium, Haiphong, Vietnam	Cambodia	2–0	0–3	2004 AFF Championship	2004 AFF Championship
2.	9 December 2008	Gelora Bung Karno Stadium, Jakarta, Indonesia	Indonesia	1–0	2–0	2008 AFF Championship	Indonesia vs. Singapore (0:2)
3.	19 December 2012	Jalan Besar Stadium, Jalan Besar, Singapore	Thailand	3–1	3–1	2012 AFF Championship	
4.	13 November 2014	Yishun Stadium, Yishun, Singapore	Laos	1–0	2–0	Friendly	Singapore vs. Laos (2:0)
5.	31 March 2015	Jalan Besar Stadium, Jalan Besar, Singapore	Guam	2–2	2–2	Friendly	Singapore vs. Guam - 31 March 2015 - Soccerway

== Honours ==
- S.League 'Young Player of the Year': 2003
- AFF Championship: 2004, 2007, 2012
- Southeast Asian Games Bronze Medallist: 2007
- Malaysia Super League: 2013 (with LionsXII)
- Malaysia Super League 'Best Defender Award': 2013
- ASEAN Football Federation Best XI: 2013
- AFF Championship All-time XI

== Notes ==
- International caps milestones

- 105th – Jordan, 4 February 2014 "FIFA Century Club fact sheet" (PDF). FIFA. 10 March 2014. Archived from the original (PDF) on 16 March 2014.

== See also ==
- List of men's footballers with 100 or more international caps
