= Shaiful Esah =

Singaporean footballer

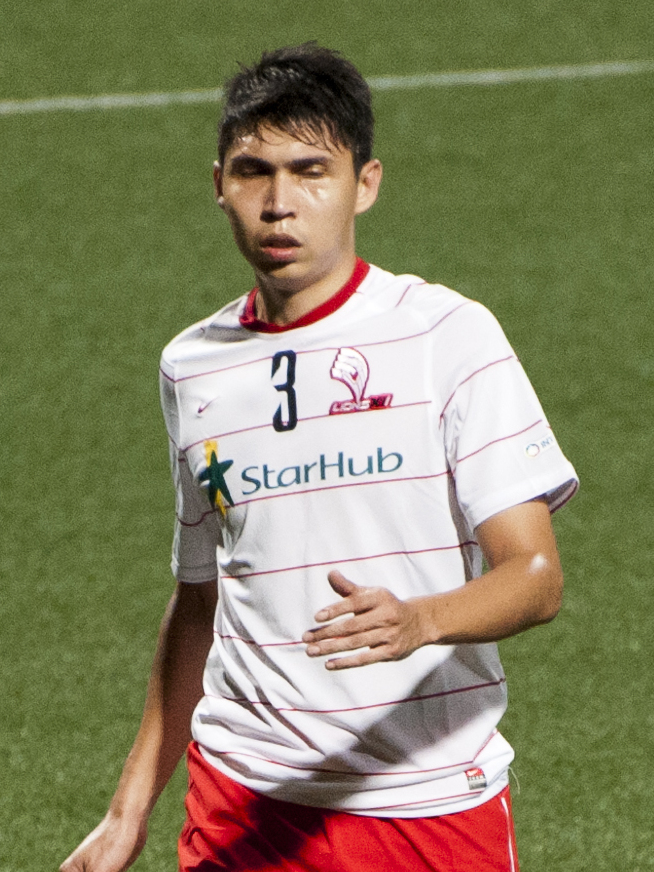
- Shaiful in 2012

Personal information
- Full name: Mohamad Shaiful bin Esah Nain.
- Date of birth: 12 May 1986 (age 40)
- Place of birth: Singapore
- Height: 1.78 m (5 ft 10 in)
- Positions: Left-back; left midfielder

Senior career*
Years	Team	Apps	(Gls)
2004	Young Lions	20	(1)
2005–2011	Singapore Armed Forces	107	(8)
2012	LionsXII	16	(2)
2013–2015	Tampines Rovers	53	(2)
2016–2017	Warriors	25	(2)
2018–2022	Commonwealth Cosmos FC		
2025	Sembawang City FC		
Total		221	(15)

International career^{‡}
2008–2015	Singapore	54	(4)
- * Club domestic league appearances and goals as of 19 August 2017 ‡ National team caps and goals as of 23:47, 29 November 2014 (UTC)

Mohamad Shaiful bin Esah Nain (born 12 May 1986) is a Singaporean former footballer who played for the Singapore Premier League and the Singapore national team as a left-back.

== Club career ==
Shaiful has previously played for S.League clubs Young Lions, Singapore Armed Forces and LionsXII. Shaiful played in the AFC Champions League during his time with the warriors. He has a cultured left foot and is deadly from set pieces and dead ball situations having scored countless goals from long range and free kicks. He is the regular taker of the corner kick and free kick for his club and country. He then later went on to sign for Tampines Rovers in 2013 till 2015 and Warriors in 2016.

Shaiful retired from football in 2017 thus ending his 13 years career as a footballer.

== International career ==
He was part of the Singapore Under-23 team that took part in the 2007 Southeast Asian Games in Korat, Thailand that won a bronze medal.

He made his debut for the Singapore against Vietnam in the 2nd leg of the quarter-final round of the Suzuki Cup.

Shaiful has also been a goal threat for oppositions with his accurate free kicks and his delivery from corners which had helped a goal-shy Singapore in their 2012 AFF Suzuki Cup attempt.

== Personal life ==
After retiring from football, Shaiful currently works as a WSH Professional in MCC Singapore.

== Career statistics ==
=== Club ===
As of match played November 2016. Caps and goals may not be correct.

Club	Season	S.League		Singapore Cup		Singapore League Cup		Asia		Total	
Club	Season	Apps	Goals	Apps	Goals	Apps	Goals	Apps	Goals	Apps	Goals
Young Lions	2004	20	1	-	-	-	-	—		20	1
Young Lions	Total	20	1	0	0	0	0	0	0	20	1
Singapore Armed Forces	2005	03	??	??	??	??	??	—		??	??
Singapore Armed Forces	2006	??	??	??	??	??	??	—		??	??
Singapore Armed Forces	2007	??	??	??	??	??	??	—		??	??
Singapore Armed Forces	2008	??	2	??	??	??	??	—		??	2
Singapore Armed Forces	2009	25	2	0	0	0	0	7	0	32	2
Singapore Armed Forces	2010	2	0	0	0	0	0	2	0	4	0
Singapore Armed Forces	2011	26	1	1	0	0	0	—		27	1
Singapore Armed Forces	Total	53	5	1	0	0	0	9	0	63	5
Club	Season	Malaysia Super League		Malaysia FA Cup		Malaysia Cup		Asia		Total	
LionsXII	2012	16	2	1	1	10	1	—		27	4
LionsXII	Total	16	2	1	1	10	1	0	0	27	4
Club	Season	S.League		Singapore Cup		Singapore League Cup		Asia		Total	
Tampines Rovers	2013	19	2	1	0	1	0	4	1	25	3
Tampines Rovers	2014	15	0	3	0	1	0	5	0	24	0
Tampines Rovers	2015	19	0	0	0	2	0	—		21	0
Tampines Rovers	Total	53	2	4	0	4	0	9	1	70	3
Warriors	2016	16	1	0	0	3	0	—		19	1
Warriors	2017	0	0	0	0	0	0	—		0	0
Warriors	Total	16	1	0	0	3	0	0	0	19	1
Warwick Knights	2022	0	0	0	0	0	0	0	0	0	0
Warwick Knights	Total	0	0	0	0	0	0	0	0	0	0
Career Total		158	11	6	1	17	1	18	1	199	14

- Young Lions and LionsXII are ineligible for qualification to AFC competitions in their respective leagues.

=== International goals ===
Scores and results list Singapore's goal tally first.

No	Date	Venue	Opponent	Score	Result	Competition
1	7 October 2011	Jalan Besar Stadium, Kallang, Singapore	Philippines	1–0	2–0	Friendly
2	4 June 2013	Thuwunna Stadium, Yangon, Myanmar	Myanmar	2–0	2–0	Friendly
3	27 November 2014	National Stadium, Kallang, Singapore	Myanmar	1–0	4–2	2014 AFF Championship
4	6 June 2015	Jurong West Sports and Recreation Centre, Jurong West, Singapore	Brunei	2–0	2–0	Friendly

== Honours ==
=== Club ===
Singapore Armed Forces

- S.League: 2006, 2007, 2008, 2009
- Singapore Cup: 2007, 2008

Tampines Rovers FC

- S.League: 2013

=== International ===
Singapore

- AFF Championship: 2012
- Southeast Asian Games: Bronze Medal - 2007, 2009
