= Khairul Nizam =

Singaporean footballer (born 1991)

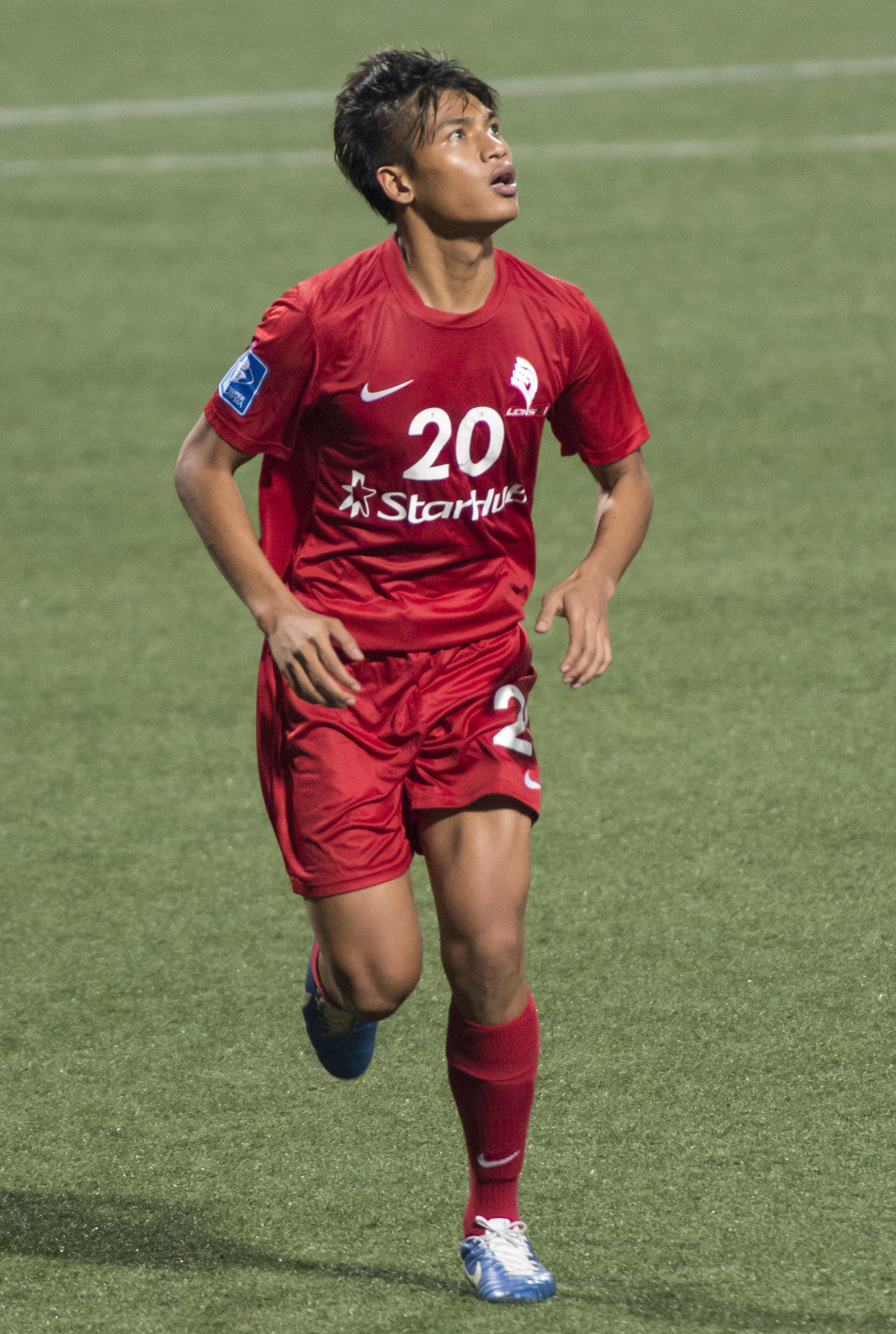
- Khairul Nizam playing for LionsXII in 2013

Personal information
- Full name: Muhammad Khairul Nizam bin Mohammad Kamal
- Date of birth: 25 June 1991 (age 35)
- Place of birth: Singapore
- Height: 1.81 m (5 ft 11 in)
- Position: Forward

Team information
- Current team: GDT Circuit FC
- Number: 9

Youth career
- Home United U-16
- National Football Academy

Senior career*
Years	Team	Apps	(Gls)
2009–2011	Young Lions	48	(13)
2012–2015	LionsXII	20	(3)
2016–2017	Home United	30	(12)
2018–2019	Warriors FC	16	(3)
2020	Geylang International	9	(4)
2021	Hougang United	6	(0)
2022	Tanjong Pagar United	16	(5)
2023-	GDT Circuit FC		

International career^{‡}
2010–	Singapore	24	(0)
Medal record
Men's football
Representing Singapore
Sea Games
Bronze medal – third place	Sea Games 2009	Football
- * Club domestic league appearances and goals as of 31 Dec 2022 ‡ National team caps and goals as of 22 November 2019

Mohammad Khairul Nizam bin Mohammad Kamal (born 25 June 1991) is a Singaporean professional footballer who plays as a winger or striker for Island Wide League club GDT Circuit FC. He is the younger brother of Khairul Amri who's also a professional footballer currently playing as striker or winger for Singapore Premier League club Tanjong Pagar United F.C.

He was first spotted when he was playing for his alma mater Serangoon Secondary School where he won the Golden Boot Award in the 2007 National ‘B’ Division Football Championship, scoring all of his nine goals from open play. He went on to represent an adidas squad from Singapore that played in a regional football tournament in Hong Kong later that year.

== Club career ==
=== Young Lions ===
Nizam began his professional football career with Under-23 side Young Lions in the S.League in 2009. He was one of the Young Lions players involved in an on-pitch fight with Beijing Guoan Talent players in their S.League match on 7 September 2010. He was charged by the Football Association of Singapore for gross misconduct and bringing the game into disrepute; he was banned for eight months and fined S$2,000 for his part in the brawl.

=== LionsXII ===
In December 2011, the FAS announced that Nizam was to join the newly formed LionsXII for the 2012 Malaysia Super League.

A catalogue of injuries over three years limited him to just 20 games between 2012 and 2014. 2015 would prove to be a better year as Nizam featured 14 times in the Malaysian Super League for the LionsXII and scored three goals.

=== Home United ===
In 2016, Nizam signed for Home United. He scored his first goal for Home United on his debut in the opening match of the 2016 season against Warriors in the Uniform Derby. However, injuries continued to curtail his career, with Nizam having gone through three knee surgeries since 2012 to repair his anterior cruciate ligament and meniscus. Nizam was eventually ruled out of the year end 2016 AFF Championship for the national team.

He scored his first goal for the 2017 S.League season in a 6-1 dismantling of Garena Young Lions in Home's first league game of the season. Subsequently, in just three starts and two substitute appearances at the start of 2017 for Home, he has racked up a goal and four assists, which led to a national recall. In total, he racked up 8 goals in all competitions for the protectors in 2017.

=== Warriors FC ===
For the 2018 S.League season, Nizam moved to Warriors FC after rejecting a contract extension at Home United.

=== After Tanjong Pagar United ===
Nizam signed for Island Wide League club GDT Circuit FC for the 2023 Island Wide League season.

== International career ==
Nizam was first called up to the Singapore senior squad in 2009 but did not feature against Thailand. He made his first international debut in a friendly match against Poland on 23 January 2010, replacing Faris Ramli in the 46th minute. Although earmarked as Singapore's next big thing, he has yet to find the back of the net for the Lions after 16 appearances. In his next two games for the Lions, against Afghanistan and Bahrain, Nizam found himself with opportunities to score in both games but somehow managed to miss them, leaving him still waiting to open his account after 18 caps.

== Others ==
=== Singapore Selection Squad ===
Nizam was selected as part of the Singapore Selection squad for The Sultan of Selangor’s Cup to be held on 6 May 2017.

== Career statistics ==
=== Club ===
As of match played 10 Oct 2021. Caps and goals may be incorrect.

Club	Season	S.League		Singapore Cup		Singapore League Cup		Asia		Total	
Club	Season	Apps	Goals	Apps	Goals	Apps	Goals	Apps	Goals	Apps	Goals
Young Lions	2009	20	5	2	0	-	-	—		20	5
Young Lions	2010	23	6	—		1	0	—		24	6
Young Lions	2011	5	2	—		0	0	—		5	2
Young Lions	Total	48	13	2	0	1	0	0	0	49	13
Club	Season	Malaysia Super League		Malaysia FA Cup		Malaysia Cup		Asia		Total	
LionsXII	2012	15	2	2	0	0	0	—		17	2
LionsXII	2013	3	1	0	0	1	0	—		4	1
LionsXII	2014	2	0	0	0	0	0	—		2	0
LionsXII	2015	??	??	??	??	??	??	—		??	??
LionsXII	Total	20	3	2	0	1	0	0	0	23	3
Club	Season	S.League		Singapore Cup		Singapore League Cup		Asia		Total	
Home United	2016	19	5	3	2	0	0	—		22	7
Home United	2017	3	1	0	0	0	0	5	1	8	2
Home United	Total	22	6	3	2	0	0	0	0	30	9
Warriors FC	2018	6	3	2	0	0	0	—		8	3
Warriors FC	2019	10	0	5	4	0	0	0	0	15	4
Warriors FC	Total	16	3	7	4	0	0	0	0	23	7
Geylang International	2020	9	4	0	0	0	0	—		9	4
Geylang International	Total	9	4	0	0	0	0	0	0	9	4
Hougang United	2021	6	0	0	0	0	0	—		6	0
Hougang United	Total	6	0	0	0	0	0	0	0	6	0
Tanjong Pagar United	2022	16	5	2	0	0	0	0	0	18	5
Tanjong Pagar United	Total	16	5	2	0	0	0	0	0	18	5
Career total		137	34	16	6	2	0	0	0	158	41

- Young Lions and LionsXII are ineligible for qualification to AFC competitions in their respective leagues.
- Young Lions withdrew from the 2011 and 2012 Singapore Cup, and the 2011 Singapore League Cup due to participation in AFC and AFF youth competitions.

== Personal life ==
Khairul Nizam is the younger brother of forward Khairul Amri, and both have previously played alongside each other at LionsXII.

== Honours ==
=== Club ===
LionsXII

- Malaysia Super League: 2013
- FA Cup Malaysia: 2015
