= 2015 Tampines Rovers FC season =

Tampines Rovers FC
2015 season
- Chairman: Desmond Ong
- Coach: V. Sundramoorthy
- Ground: Jurong West Stadium
Home colours	Away colours

The 2015 S.League season is Tampines Rovers's 20th season at the top level of Singapore football and 70th year in existence as a football club. The club also competed in the Singapore League Cup, Singapore Cup, Singapore Community Shield.

== Squad ==
=== Sleague Squad ===
As of 4 May 2017.

No.	Name	Nationality	Date of birth (age)	Last club	Contract since	Contract end
Goalkeepers
1	Rodrigo Pacheco	(Brazil)		(Brazil)	2015	2015
21	Joey Sim	(Singapore)	2 March 1987 (age 39)	(Singapore) Geylang International	2015	
22	Siddiq Durimi	(Singapore)	27 May 1988 (age 38)	(Singapore) Admiralty FC	2015	2015
Defenders
2	Ismadi Mukhtar	(Singapore)	16 December 1983 (age 42)	(Singapore) Woodlands Wellington	2010	
3	Jufri Taha	(Singapore)	4 March 1985 (age 41)	(Singapore) Balestier Khalsa	2010	
4	Fahrudin Mustafic	(Singapore) (Serbia)	17 April 1981 (age 45)	(Indonesia) Persela Lamongan	2011	
5	Zulfadli Zainal Abidin	(Singapore)	26 April 1988 (age 38)	(Singapore) Warriors FC	2015	2015
7	Shaiful Esah	(Singapore)	12 May 1986 (age 40)	(Singapore) LionsXII	2013	2015
13	Predrag Počuča	(Croatia)	24 January 1986 (age 40)	(Malaysia) Sabah FA	2015	2015
16	Ismail Yunos	(Singapore)	24 October 1986 (age 40)	(Singapore) Home United	2015	2015
19	Aqhari Abdullah	(Singapore)	9 July 1991 (age 35)	(Singapore) LionsXII	2015	2015
Midfielders
6	Ridhuan Muhammad	(Singapore)	6 May 1984 (age 42)	(Singapore) Geylang International	2015	2015
8	Firdaus Idros	(Singapore)	12 August 1986 (age 40)	(Singapore) Tanjong Pagar United	2015	2015
10	Isa Halim	(Singapore)	15 May 1986 (age 40)	(Singapore) LionsXII	2013	2015
12	Fabian Kwok	(Singapore)	17 March 1989 (age 37)	(Singapore) Geylang International	2015	
17	Jamil Ali	(Singapore)	2 May 1984 (age 42)	(Singapore) Woodlands Wellington	2010	2015
20	Robert Alviž	(Croatia)	6 September 1984 (age 42)	(Indonesia) Persebaya Surabaya	2015	2015
31	Naeem Rahimi	(Australia) (Iran)	4 April 1994 (age 32)	(Malaysia) DRB-Hicom F.C.	2015	2015
Forwards
9	Mateo Roskam	(Croatia)	16 March 1987 (age 39)	(Malaysia) Sime Darby F.C.	2015	2015
11	Rodrigo Tosi	(Brazil)	6 January 1983 (age 43)	(Brazil) Paraná Clube	2015	2015
14	Indra Sahdan Daud	(Singapore)	5 March 1979 (age 47)	(Singapore) Home United	2015	2015
18	Noh Alam Shah	(Singapore)	3 September 1980 (age 46)	(Indonesia) PSS Sleman	2014	2015
Players who left club during season
10	Eddy Viator	(France)	2 June 1982 (age 44)	(Malaysia) SPA F.C.	2015	2015
15	Srećko Mitrović	(Australia)	17 February 1984 (age 42)	(Malaysia) Sabah FA	2015	2015
	Fabrice Noël	(Haiti)	21 July 1985 (age 41)	(Malaysia) ATM FA	2015	2015

== Coaching staff ==
Position	Name	Ref.
Head coach	(Singapore) V. Sundramoorthy	
Assistant coach	(Singapore) Herman Zailani	
Goalkeeping coach	(Singapore) Rameshpal Singh	
Team manager	(Singapore) Desmund Khusnin	
Physiotherapist		
Kitman	(Singapore) Goh Koon Hiang	
Director of Football	(Singapore) Jita Singh	

== Transfers ==
=== Pre-season transfers ===
==== In ====
Position	Player	Transferred From	Ref
GK	(Brazil) Rodrigo Pacheco		
GK	(Singapore) Siddiq Durimi	(Singapore) Admiralty FC	
DF	(Croatia) Predrag Počuča	(Serbia) FK BSK Borča	
DF	(France) Eddy Viator	(Malaysia) SPA F.C.	
DF	(Singapore) Zulfadli Zainal Abidin	(Singapore) Warriors FC	
DF	(Singapore) Aqhari Abdullah	(Singapore) LionsXII	
MF	(Singapore) Firdaus Idros	(Singapore) Tanjong Pagar United	
MF	(Singapore) Ridhuan Muhammad	(Singapore) Geylang International	
MF	(Croatia) Robert Alviž	(Indonesia) Persebaya Surabaya	
MF	(Australia) Mohammad Naeem Rahimi	(Malaysia) DRB-Hicom F.C.	
MF	(Australia) Srećko Mitrović	(Malaysia) Sabah FA	
MF	(Singapore) Isa Halim	(Singapore) LionsXII	
FW	(Croatia) Mateo Roskam	(Malaysia) Sime Darby F.C.	
FW	(Brazil) Rodrigo Tosi	(Brazil) Paraná Clube	
FW	(Singapore) Indra Sahdan Daud	(Singapore) Home United	

==== Retained ====
Position	Player	Ref
DF	(Singapore) Shaiful Esah	
GK	(Singapore) Joey Sim	
DF	(Singapore) Mustafic Fahrudin	
DF	(Singapore) Ismadi Mukhtar	
DF	(Singapore) Jufri Taha	
MF	(Singapore) Fabian Kwok	

==== Out ====
Position	Player	Transferred To	Ref
GK	(Australia) Justin Pasfield	(Australia) Sydney United 58 FC	
GK	(Singapore) Ridhuan Barudin	(Singapore) Hougang United	
DF	(Singapore) Ang Zhiwei	(Singapore) Home United	
DF	(Singapore) Abdil Qaiyyim Mutalib	(Singapore) Home United	
DF	(Singapore) Anaz Abdul Hadee	(Singapore) Geylang International	
DF	(Japan) Kunihiro Yamashita	(Singapore) Hougang United	
DF	(New Zealand) Jake Butler	(New Zealand) Waitakere United	
MF	(Singapore) Christopher van Huizen	(Singapore) Young Lions FC	
MF	(Singapore) Shahdan Sulaiman	(Singapore) LionsXII	
MF	(Singapore) Matthew Abraham	(Singapore) Hougang United	
FW	(Slovenia) Jozef Kapláň	(Singapore) Geylang International	
FW	(Serbia) Miljan Mrdaković	(Greece) Levadiakos F.C. (D2)	
FW	(Singapore) Aleksandar Đurić	Retirement	

=== Trial ===
Position	Player	From	Ref

== Friendlies ==
=== Pre-season friendlies ===
Win Draw Loss

== Team statistics ==
=== Appearances and goals ===
No.	Pos.	Player	Sleague		Singapore Cup		League Cup		AFC Cup		Total	
No.	Pos.	Player	Apps.	Goals	Apps.	Goals	Apps.	Goals	Apps.	Goals	Apps.	Goals
1	GK	(Brazil) Rodrigo Pacheco	17	0	2	0	1	0	0	0	20	0
2	DF	(Singapore) Ismadi Mukhtar	23(2)	1	1	1	2	0	0	0	28	2
3	DF	(Singapore) Jufri Taha	13(4)	0	1	0	0	0	0	0	18	0
4	DF	(Singapore) Fahrudin Mustafic	23	2	2	0	2	1	0	0	27	3
5	DF	(Singapore) Zulfadli Zainal Abidin	13(3)	0	0(1)	0	1(1)	0	0	0	19	0
6	MF	(Singapore) Ridhuan Muhammad	11(8)	2	2	0	0(1)	0	0	0	22	2
7	DF	(Singapore) Shaiful Esah	16(3)	0	2	0	2	0	0	0	23	0
8	MF	(Singapore) Firdaus Idros	20(4)	1	2	0	1	0	0	0	27	1
9	FW	(Croatia) Mateo Roskam	20(6)	14	2	0	2	1	0	0	30	15
10	MF	(Singapore) Isa Halim	12(2)	0	2	0	1	0	0	0	17	0
11	FW	(Brazil) Rodrigo Tosi	23	14	2	0	2	0	0	0	27	14
12	MF	(Singapore) Fabian Kwok	13(10)	1	1	0	1	0	0	0	25	1
13	DF	(Croatia) Predrag Počuča	23	1	2	1	2	0	0	0	27	2
14	FW	(Singapore) Indra Sahdan Daud	4(7)	1	0	0	0	0	0	0	11	1
16	DF	(Singapore) Ismail Yunos	11(2)	0	0	0	0(2)	0	0	0	15	0
17	DF	(Singapore) Shakir Hamzah	3(7)	1	0	0	0(1)	0	0	0	11	1
18	FW	(Singapore) Noh Alam Shah	1(13)	2	0(2)	0	1	0	0	0	17	2
19	DF	(Singapore) Aqhari Abdullah	3(6)	1	0(1)	0	1(1)	0	0	0	12	1
20	MF	(Croatia) Robert Alviž	20	1	1	0	1	0	0	0	22	1
21	GK	(Singapore) Joey Sim	8	0	0	0	1	0	0	0	9	0
22	GK	(Singapore) Siddiq Durimi	2	0	0	0	0	0	0	0	3	0
31	MF	(Australia) (Iran) Naeem Rahimi	9(1)	1	0	0	0	0	0	0	10	1
Players who have played this season and/or sign for the season but had left the club or on loan to other club
10	FW	(France) Eddy Viator	10	0	0	0	0	0	0	0	10	0
11	FW	(Haiti) Fabrice Noël	9(1)	1	0	0	0	0	0	0	10	1
15	DF	(Australia) Srećko Mitrović	0	0	0	0	0	0	0	0	0	0

== Competitions ==
=== Overview ===
Competition	Record							
Competition	P	W	D	L	GF	GA	GD	Win %

=== S.League ===
Win Draw Loss

2 March 2015 1	Albirex Niigata (S)	0–1	Tampines Rovers	Jurong East, Singapore
19:30 UTC+8		Details		Stadium: Jurong East Stadium

5 March 2015 2	Tampines Rovers	1–0	Courts Young Lions	Jurong West, Singapore
19:30 UTC+8		Details		Stadium: Jurong West Stadium

13 March 2015 3	Home United	2–0	Tampines Rovers	Kallang, Singapore
19:30 UTC+8		Details		Stadium: Jalan Besar Stadium

18 March 2015 4	Tampines Rovers	2–0	Hougang United	Jurong West, Singapore
19:30 UTC+8		Details		Stadium: Jurong West Stadium

3 April 2015 5	Geylang International	3–2	Tampines Rovers	Kallang, Singapore
20:00 UTC+8		Details		Stadium: Jalan Besar Stadium

17 April 2015 6	Tampines Rovers	2–3	Warriors	Kallang, Singapore
19:30 UTC+8		Details		Stadium: Jalan Besar Stadium

22 April 2015 7	Balestier Khalsa	1–1	Tampines Rovers	Toa Payoh, Singapore
19:30 UTC+8		Details		Stadium: Toa Payoh Stadium

6 May 2015 8	Tampines Rovers	0–0	Albirex Niigata (S)	Jurong West, Singapore
19:30 UTC+8		Details		Stadium: Jurong West Stadium

10 May 2015 9	Brunei DPMM	2–0	Tampines Rovers	Bandar Seri Begawan, Brunei
20:15 UTC+8		Details		Stadium: Hassanal Bolkiah National Stadium

17 May 2015 10	Tampines Rovers	3–0	Home United	Jurong West, Singapore
19:30 UTC+8		Details		Stadium: Jurong West Stadium

24 July 2015 11	Hougang United	0–3	Tampines Rovers	Hougang, Singapore
19:30 UTC+8		Details		Stadium: Hougang Stadium

29 July 2015 12	Tampines Rovers	2–0	Geylang International	Jurong West, Singapore
19:30 UTC+8		Details		Stadium: Jurong West Stadium

1 August 2015 13	Tampines Rovers	1–1	Brunei DPMM	Jurong West, Singapore
19:30 UTC+8		Details		Stadium: Jurong West Stadium

7 August 2015 14	Warriors	2–1	Tampines Rovers	Choa Chu Kang, Singapore
19:30 UTC+8		Details		Stadium: Choa Chu Kang Stadium

21 August 2015 15	Tampines Rovers	0–0	Balestier Khalsa	Kallang, Singapore
19:30 UTC+8		Details		Stadium: Jalan Besar Stadium

26 August 2015 16	Harimau Muda	0–1	Tampines Rovers	Malacca, Malaysia
20:00 UTC+8		Details		Stadium: Hang Jebat Stadium

15 September 2015 17	Tampines Rovers	5–1	Harimau Muda	Kallang, Singapore
19:30 UTC+8		Details		Stadium: Jalan Besar Stadium

19 September 2015 18	Tampines Rovers	0–1	Courts Young Lions	Jurong West, Singapore
19:30 UTC+8		Details		Stadium: Jurong West Stadium

27 September 2015 19	Courts Young Lions	1–3	Tampines Rovers	Kallang, Singapore
19:30 UTC+8		Details		Stadium: Jalan Besar Stadium

17 October 2015 20	Tampines Rovers	1–0	Hougang United	Jurong West, Singapore
19:30 UTC+8		Details		Stadium: Jurong West Stadium

20 October 2015 21	Geylang International	1–4	Tampines Rovers	Bedok, Singapore
19:30 UTC+8		Details		Stadium: Bedok Stadium

28 October 2015 22	Brunei DPMM	0–1	Tampines Rovers	Bandar Seri Begawan, Brunei
20:15 UTC+8		Details		Stadium: Hassanal Bolkiah National Stadium

2 November 2015 23	Tampines Rovers	0–0	Warriors	Jurong West, Singapore
19:30 UTC+8		Details		Stadium: Jurong West Stadium

5 November 2015 24	Balestier Khalsa	4–3	Tampines Rovers	Toa Payoh, Singapore
19:30 UTC+8		Details		Stadium: Toa Payoh Stadium

8 November 2015 25	Home United	2–3	Tampines Rovers	Yishun, Singapore
19:30 UTC+8		Details		Stadium: Yishun Stadium

13 November 2015 26	Albirex Niigata (S)	0–1	Tampines Rovers	Jurong East, Singapore
19:30 UTC+8		Details		Stadium: Jurong East Stadium

21 November 2015 27	Tampines Rovers	1–1	Harimau Muda	Jurong West, Singapore
20:15 UTC+8		Details		Stadium: Jurong West Stadium

Pos	Team	Pld	W	D	L	GF	GA	GD	Pts	Qualification
1	(Brunei) DPMM FC (Note: The three foreign clubs – Albirex Niigata (S), DPMM FC and Harimau Muda – as well as the Football Association of Singapore (FAS) under-23 team, Young Lions, are not eligible for any AFC competition spots.)	27	15	7	5	48	26	+22	52	
2	Tampines Rovers	27	14	6	7	42	25	+17	48	Qualification to AFC Champions League Qualifying Round 1 or AFC Cup Group Stage
3	(Japan) Albirex Niigata (S)	27	13	6	8	27	17	+10	45	
4	Balestier Khalsa	27	12	8	7	39	35	+4	44	Qualification to AFC Cup Group Stage
5	Warriors FC	27	11	4	12	40	51	−11	37	

Source: S.League
Rules for classification: 1) points; 2) goal difference; 3) number of goals scored; 4) number of wins

=== Singapore Cup ===
==== Quarter-final ====
Tampines Rovers (Singapore)	1–3	(Brunei) DPMM FC	Jurong West Stadium
Pocuca 16'		McLean 5'; Ali Rahman 13'; Ramazotti 48'

DPMM FC (Brunei)	0–1	(Singapore) Tampines Rovers	Jalan Besar Stadium
		Mukhtar 90'

Tampines Rovers lost 2–3 on aggregate.

=== Singapore TNP League Cup ===
Pos	Team	Pld	W	D	L	GF	GA	GD	Pts	Qualification
1	Balestier Khalsa	2	1	1	0	6	2	+4	4	Advance to semi-final
2	Warriors	2	1	0	1	1	4	−3	3	
3	Tampines Rovers	2	0	1	1	2	3	−1	1	

Source: S.League

Win Draw Loss

26 June 2015	Tampines Rovers	2–2	Balestier Khalsa	Jurong West Stadium
20:30 UTC+8	Mustafić 52'; Roskam 58'		Zulkiffli 54'; Fadhil 71'	Referee: Sukhbir Singh

1 July 2015	Warriors FC	1–0	Tampines Rovers	Woodlands Stadium
20:30 UTC+8	Vélez 37'			Referee: Muhd Taqi
