= 2015 Malaysia FA Cup final =

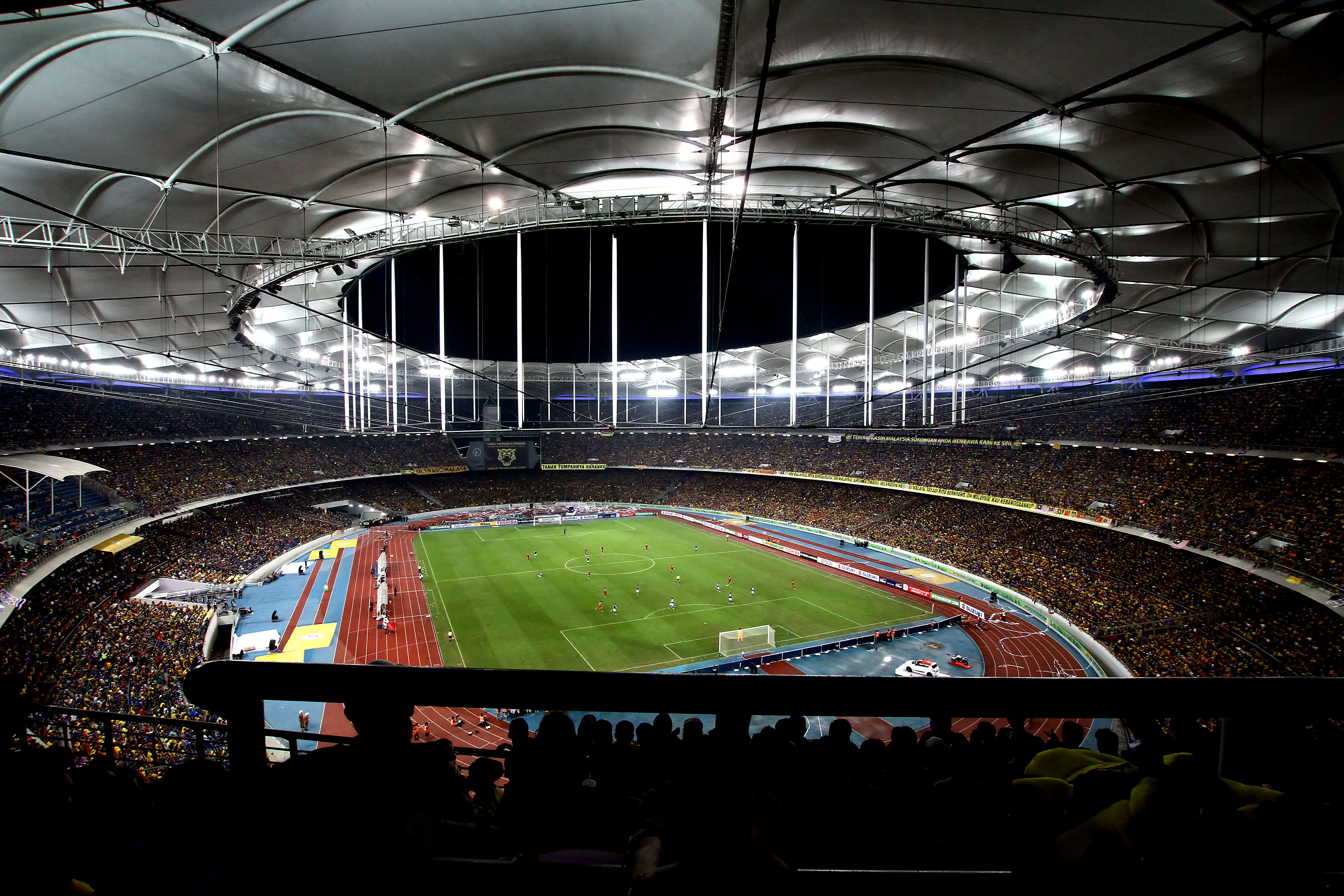
- Bukit Jalil National Stadium hosted the final.
- Event: 2015 Malaysia FA Cup
Kelantan	(Singapore) LionsXII
1	3
- Date: 26 May 2015
- Venue: Bukit Jalil National Stadium, Kuala Lumpur, Malaysia
- Man of the Match: Izwan Mahbud
- Referee: Zamzaidi Katimin
- Attendance: 85,000

The 2015 Malaysia FA Cup final was a football match which was played on 26 May 2015, to determine the champion of the 2015 Malaysia FA Cup.

The final was played between Kelantan FA and Felda LionsXII. LionsXII won 3–1 to win their first Malaysia FA Cup title.

== Road to final ==
Opponent	Agg.	1st leg	2nd leg	Knockout phase	Opponent	Agg.	1st leg	2nd leg
Sarawak	1–2 (A) (one-leg match)			Round of 32	Kedah United	0–4 (A) (one-leg match)		
Kuala Lumpur	1–0 (H) (one-leg match)			Round of 16	Putrajaya SPA	4–0 (H) (one-leg match)		
Sime Darby	4–1	1–1 (A)	3–0 (H)	Quarterfinals	JDT II	4–0	2–0 (H)	0–2 (A)
Pahang	3–2	1–0 (A)	3–1 (H)	Semifinals	Terengganu FA	4–4(a)	2–1 (H)	2–3 (A)

=== Details ===
23 May 2015
20:45 (UTC+8)

Kelantan FA	1–3	(Singapore) LionsXII
Wan Zack 63'		Faris 6'; Sahil 81', 91' (pen.)

Bukit Jalil National Stadium, Kuala Lumpur
Attendance: 85,000
Referee: Zamzaidi Katimin

Kelantan FA	LionsXII

GK	19	(Malaysia) Khairul Fahmi
RB	5	(Malaysia) Nik Shahrul Azim
CB	4	(Australia) Jonathan McKain
CB	42	(Malaysia) Amiridzwan Taj	(yellow card) 91'
LB	15	(Malaysia) Noor Hazrul
RM	11	(Malaysia) Wan Zack Haikal	(substituted off) 75'
CM	16	(Malaysia) Badhri Radzi (c)
CM	2	(Malaysia) Norhafiz Zamani Misbah	(substituted off) 72'
LM	8	(Malaysia) Wan Zaharulnizam
CF	9	(Colombia) Erwin Carrillo
CF	50	(Brazil) Gilmar
Substitutes:
GK	1	(Malaysia) Muhammad Syazwan
DF	6	(Malaysia) Farisham Ismail
DF	24	(Malaysia) Zairul Fitree
FW	13	(Malaysia) Fakri Saarani
FW	23	(Malaysia) Khairul Izuan
FW	10	(Malaysia) Nor Farhan		(substituted in) 72'
FW	47	(Nigeria) Austin Amutu		(substituted in) 75'
Manager:
(Malaysia) Azraai Khor

GK	1	(Singapore) Izwan Mahbud (c)
RB	11	(Singapore) Nazrul Nazari
CB	6	(Singapore) Madhu Mohana
CB	23	(Singapore) Zulfahmi Arifin
LB	8	(Singapore) Hafiz Sujad
CM	21	(Singapore) Safuwan Baharudin
CM	13	(Singapore) Izzdin Shafiq
AMC	17	(Singapore) Faris Ramli	(yellow card) 23'
AMC	7	(Singapore) Gabriel Quak
AMC	19	(Singapore) Khairul Amri	(substituted off) 80'
CF	10	(Singapore) Khairul Nizam	(substituted off) 59'
Substitutes:
GK	18	(Singapore) Khairulhin Khalid
DF	9	(Singapore) Faritz Hameed
MF	22	(Singapore) Christopher van Huizen
MF	4	(Singapore) Isa Halim
MF	24	(Singapore) Firdaus Kasman	(substituted in) 80'
MF	30	(Singapore) Syafiq Zainal
FW	32	(Singapore) Sahil Suhaimi	(substituted in) 59'	(yellow card) 89'
Head Coach:
(Singapore) Fandi Ahmad

Man of the Match:
Izwan Mahbud (LionsXII)

Match rules

- 90 minutes
- 30 minutes of extra time if necessary
- Penalty shoot-out if scores still level
- Seven named substitutes, of which up to three may be used

== Winner ==
2015 Piala FA Winner

LionsXII

1st Title
