= Isa Halim =

Singaporean footballer (born 1986)

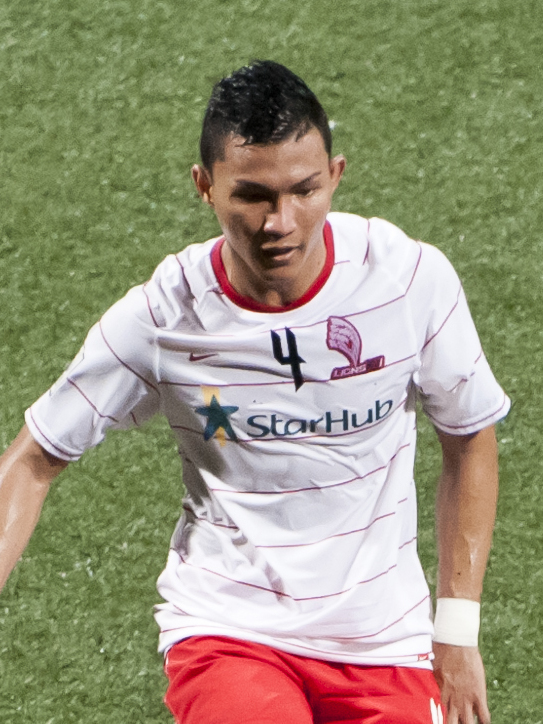
- Isa playing for LionsXII in 2012

Personal information
- Full name: Mohammad Isa bin Abdul Halim
- Date of birth: 15 May 1986 (age 40)
- Place of birth: Singapore
- Height: 1.76 m (5 ft 9 in)
- Position: Defensive midfielder

Team information
- Current team: Tanjong Pagar United (Assistant Coach)

Youth career
- –2004: National Football Academy

Senior career*
Years	Team	Apps	(Gls)
2005	Woodlands Wellington	25	(0)
2005–2009	Young Lions	69	(3)
2009–2011	Home United	50	(0)
2012–2015	LionsXII	77	(6)
2015	Tampines Rovers	29	(5)
2016–2017	Geylang International	35	(5)
Total		285	(19)

International career
2005–2013	Singapore	63	(1)

Managerial career
- 2017–2024: Singapore Sports School
- 2024–2025: Tokyo Verdy (assistant)
- 2025–: Tanjong Pagar United (assistant)
- * Club domestic league appearances and goals

Mohammad Isa bin Abdul Halim (born 15 May 1986) is a Singaporean former footballer who last played as a defensive-midfielder for Singapore Premier League club Geylang International and the Singapore national team. He started out playing football as a centre-forward in his youth.

Isa holds an AFC ‘A’ Diploma Coaching license.

== Club career ==
=== Woodlands Wellington ===
Isa started his professional career at the age of 19 playing for Woodlands Wellington in the 2005 S.League season. In his first season, he was part of the club starting line up in the 2005 Singapore Cup final where Woodlands Wellington lost 3–2 to Home United.

=== Young Lions ===
In January 2006, Isa moved to Young Lions while he was serving his compulsory National Service. On 22 May 2006, he scored his first professional career goal in a 3–0 win over Albirex Niigata (S).

In the 2008 S.League season, Isa was named the club captain for the campaign.

=== Home United ===
On 23 April 2009, Isa moved to Home United after 4 seasons at Young Lions. He make his club debut on 25 April in a 4–0 lost against Super Reds.

On 19 November 2011, Isa won his first major trophy after helping Home United to win the 2011 Singapore Cup in a 1–0 win over Albirex Niigata (S).

=== LionsXII ===
On 9 December 2011, Isa was announced as a player for the newly created club, LionsXII which will compete in the 2012 Malaysia Super League. In the club debut season, they ended up as the runner-ups in the league. After Hariss Harun left the club, Isa was made the club captain in the 2015 season.

Isa was part of the club player that help to win the 2013 Malaysia Super League and the 2015 Malaysia FA Cup.

=== Tampines Rovers ===
On 27 June 2015, after the dissolvement of LionsXII, Isa joined Tampines Rovers, in the process teaming up with his former coach V. Sundramoorthy. He make his debut on 1 July in the 2015 Singapore League Cup match against Warriors.

=== Geylang International ===
In January 2016, Isa moved to rivals, Geylang International for the 2016 season where he was named as the club captain for the campaign. He made his debut on 25 February coming on as a late substitution in a 2–0 win over Young Lions.

In January 2018, Isa announced his retirement from football.

== International career ==
=== Youth ===
Isa was also part of the Singapore U23 team that took part in the 2005 Southeast Asian Games in Philippines and also won a bronze medal for the 2007 edition in Korat, Thailand.

=== Senior ===
Isa made his debut for the Singapore on 11 October 2005 against Cambodia.

Isa was part of the team that won the 2007 AFF Championship and the 2012 AFF Championship.

On 29 February 2012, he scored his first international goal in a 7–1 lost against Iraq during the 2014 FIFA World Cup qualification at the Grand Hamad Stadium.

== Coaching career ==
=== Singapore Sports School ===
After hanging up his playing boots in 2017, Isa made the switch to coaching where he became the Singapore Sports School football head coach. In 2023, he guided them to win the 'B' Division boys’ League One championship final where it was the school's first national title since 2018.

=== Tokyo Verdy ===
As part of the ‘Coaches Overseas Attachment’ pilot programme by 'Unleash The Roar' football project, Isa alongside Noh Alam Shah embarked on an overseas coaching attachment with Japanese top-flight club Tokyo Verdy of the J1 League. Both Isa and Alam Shah are the first batch of coaches under the programme where they will be immersed in the day-to-day running of the club. The duo hold an Asian Football Confederation ‘A’ Diploma Coaching license, and will be support coaches for the Japanese team. They have started their overseas coaching attachment with Tokyo Verdy since 24 May 2024 and will be with the club until 10 December 2024.

=== Tanjong Pagar United ===
On 28 August 2025, Isa was announced as Tanjong Pagar United assistant coach working under Noh Alam Shah at the club.

== Personal life ==
According to an interview done in November 2007, Isa only got interested in football after watching a match Singapore and Malaysia with his grandfather. Isa started playing football competitively when he was 13 years old, back in his secondary school days, playing for Greenridge Secondary School. But it was only two years later when he got selected for Woodlands Wellington's and Singapore Under-16 teams did he take football seriously.

== Sponsorship and media ==
Isa used to front the football side of things for German-sportswear company, Adidas in Singapore along with other teammates in the national team like Lionel Lewis. In February 2008, he with a dozen other world-renowned footballers like Lionel Messi, Arjen Robben and David Villa graced the Adidas worldwide launch of the F50 TUNiT football boot at the Centre Convencions Internacional in Barcelona, Spain.

In 2015, Isa became the NKF Ambassador where he promotes healthy living and prevent kidney disease.

In 2020, He has switched over to Puma along with other Singaporean footballers such as Shi Jiayi, Juma'at Jantan, Lionel Lewis and Erwan Gunawan.

== Career statistics ==
=== International ===
International goals

No	Date	Venue	Opponent	Score	Result	Competition
1	29 February 2012	Grand Hamad Stadium, Doha, Qatar	Iraq	3–1	7–1	2014 FIFA World Cup qualification

== Honours ==
=== Club ===
==== Home United ====
- Singapore Cup: 2011

==== LionsXII ====
- Malaysia Super League: 2013
- Malaysia FA Cup: 2015

=== International ===
==== Singapore ====
- AFF Championship: 2007, 2012
- Southeast Asian Games: Bronze Medal – 2007
