= Sahil Suhaimi =

Singaporean footballer (born 1992)

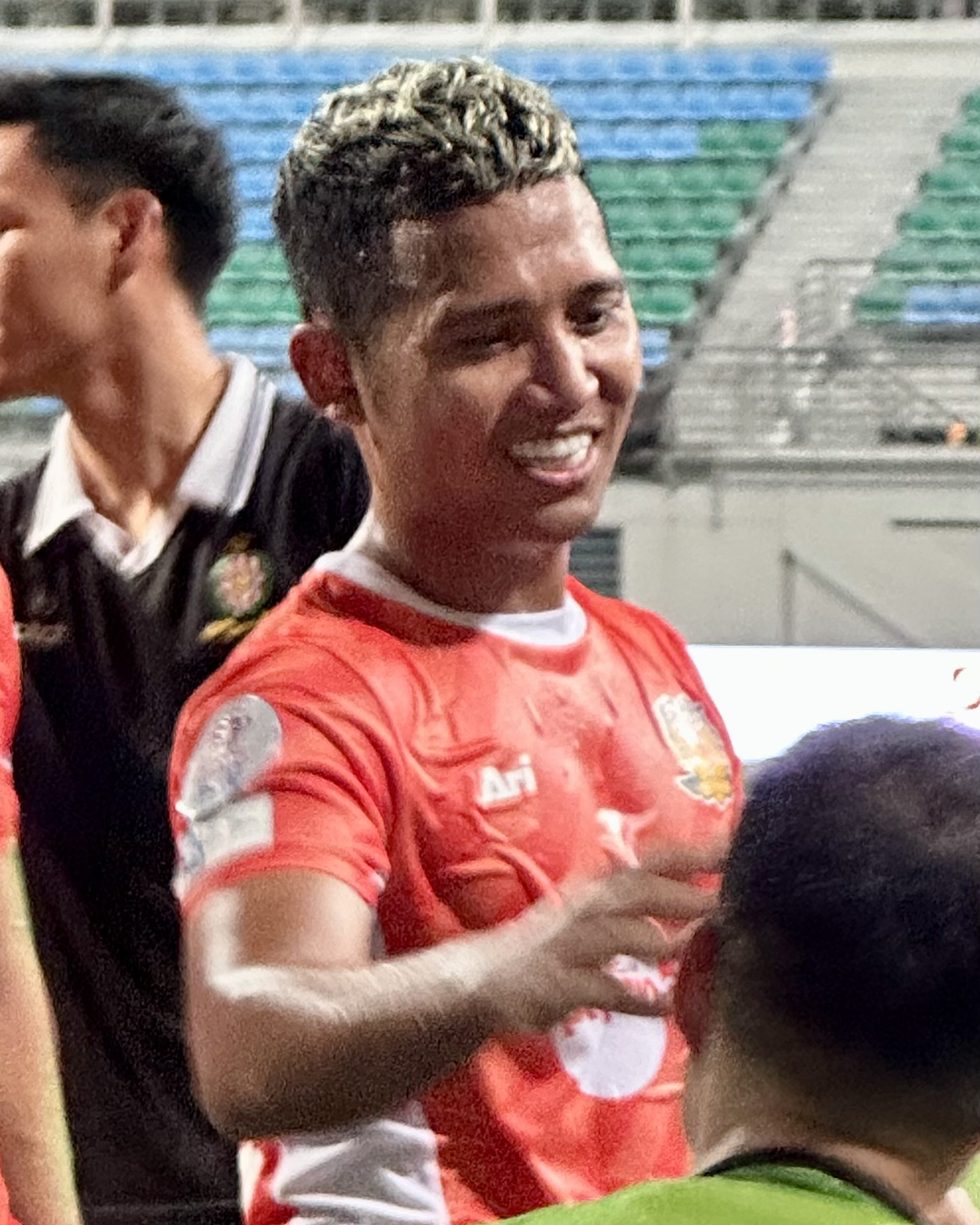
- Sahil with Hougang United in 2023

Personal information
- Full name: Mohamad Sahil bin Suhaimi
- Date of birth: 8 July 1992 (age 34)
- Place of birth: Singapore
- Height: 1.73 m (5 ft 8 in)
- Positions: Forward; midfielder

Team information
- Current team: Tanjong Pagar United
- Number: 32

Youth career
- 2004–2010: National Football Academy

Senior career*
Years	Team	Apps	(Gls)
2010–2014	Courts Young Lions	32	(10)
2015	LionsXII	17	(3)
2016	Geylang International	22	(5)
2017	Tampines Rovers	0	(0)
2017	Sarawak FA	12	(2)
2018–2019	Warriors FC	44	(6)
2020–2023	Hougang United	53	(7)
2024–	Tanjong Pagar United	38	(9)

International career^{‡}
2013–2014	Singapore U23	17	(5)
2013–	Singapore	23	(1)
Medal record
Men's football
Representing Singapore
Sea Games
Bronze medal – third place	Sea Games 2013	Football
- * Club domestic league appearances and goals as of 22 November 2019 ‡ National team caps and goals as of 18 November 2019

Mohamad Sahil bin Suhaimi (born 8 July 1992) is a Singaporean professional footballer who plays as a forward or midfielder for Singapore Premier League club Tanjong Pagar United and the Singapore national team. He was best known for outstanding performances during his time at LionsXII.

== Club career ==
=== Young Lions ===
Sahil Suhaimi made his S.League debut as a 17-year-old against Étoile FC in 2010 as a midfielder and impressed against the more physical French side but National Service restricted further appearances.

=== Breakthrough ===
During the 2012 Inaugural Nexlions Cup in December 2012, the then 20-year-old Sahil made appearances for Singapore U23 against Liverpool's and Manchester United's U23 teams, where he scored the team's only goal in their tournament against Manchester United. Despite rumours of Warriors FC scouting Sahil during the tournament, the Courts Young Lions signed Sahil while Warriors FC signed Sufian Anuar from LionsXII instead.

It proved to a breakthrough for Sahil as he impressed after signing for the Courts Young Lions during the football season in 2013. Even during friendlies, Sahil scored in both games against Malaysian giants Johor Darul Ta'zim who boasted a side with former Italian, Spanish and Malaysian internationals, in both home and away games which ended 1–1 for the Young Lions. Throughout the 2013 S.League season, Sahil impressed with his flair, technical ability, dribbles and his willing attitude to pressure opposing defenders."

=== LionsXII ===
Having impressed during the 2014 S.League Season, Sahil was signed up to the LionsXII for the 2015 Malaysian Super League Season. He made his competitive debut as a substitute in the opening game of the season and scored with a brilliantly taken freekick. On 28 February 2015, Sahil then went on to notch a brace in the LionsXII's opening game of the 2015 Malaysia FA Cup, after coming as a half-time substitute, to help the Lions win 4–0 against Kedah United and send the Singaporean outfit into the Round of 16. The Lions then went on to win the 2015 Malaysia FA Cup in a 3–1 win against Kelantan in the finals, where Sahil had scored the final two goals during the 82nd and 92nd minute. Sahil managed to score 7 goals (4 from the Malaysia FA Cup and 3 in league matches) in 26 appearances for the LionsXII, despite making most of his appearance from the substitute bench.

=== Geylang International ===
In December 2015, after the disbandment of LionsXII, Sahil joined Geylang International for the 2016 S.League season. He scored his first goal for the Eagles in a 1–1 draw against Brunei DPMM.

=== Tampines Rovers ===
Sahil has signed for Tampines Rovers for the 2017 S.League season but was not registered in the club S.League squad, but only for the 2017 AFC Cup squad as he was in negotiations with overseas clubs when the Stags finalised their roster for the league campaign.

==== Trials at Burnley ====
On 8 April 2017, Sahil joined Burnley of the English Premier League for a month long training stint which he became the third Singaporean to train with an English Premier League club after Lionel Lewis and Shahril Jantan.

=== Sarawak FA ===
After returning from England, on 23 May 2017, Sahil secured a move to Sarawak FA as one of their foreign players ahead of the 2017 Malaysia Super League season playing alongside former Tampines Rovers striker, Mateo Roskam. He made 12 appearances for the Borneo club, scoring two goals in the process. On 15 July 2017, He scored his first goal for the club in a 3–1 defeat to Johor Darul Ta'zim.

=== Warriors FC ===
On 6 February 2018, Sahil joined Warriors FC making 51 appearances for the club.

=== Hougang United ===
On 6 January 2020, Sahil joined Hougang United. During the 2022 AFC Cup group stage match, he scored a brace against Laos club, Young Elephants in a 3–1 victory. In the 2022 Singapore Cup 1st leg of the semi-finals fixture, he scored a brace against league champions, Albirex Niigata (S) which Sahil went on to win the 2022 Singapore Cup with Hougang in their first ever piece of silverware in the club history.

=== Tanjong Pagar United ===
After being out of contract for nearly 6 months, Sahil joined Tanjong Pagar United on 14 June 2024. He scored his first goal for the club in a 3–2 lost against Young Lions on 22 June.

== International career ==
=== Youth ===
During the 2013 SEA Games, Sahil played a key role as the Singapore U23 team won the Bronze, and finished as joint top scorers in the tournament.

Sahil was once against selected to play for Singapore U23 in the 2015 Southeast Asian Games. Coach Aide selected him as part of the squad along with stars Irfan Fandi. However, he disappointed throughout the tournament only managing to find the net once against Cambodia in a breakaway, as Singapore were knocked out in the group stages after losing 0–1 to Indonesia and Myanmar 1–2. He had also missed several opportunities notably against Philippines in a 2–0 win which one of the effort was saved and had 2 shots hit the bar, several slightly over the bar.

=== Senior ===
Sahil earned his first international cap against Laos on 10 October 2013, as a substitute in the second half after Singapore national team head coach, Bernd Stange was impressed with Sahil's performance in the 2013 S.League season.

On 6 September 2014, Sahil scored his first international goal against in a friendly match against Papua New Guinea at the Hougang Stadium.

Sahil was also included in the 2022 VFF Tri-Nations Series tournament against Vietnam and India on 21 and 24 September.

== Career statistics ==
=== Club ===
As of 27 Feb 2022. Caps and goals may not be correct.

Club	Season	S.League		Singapore Cup		Singapore League Cup		Asia		Total	
Club	Season	Apps	Goals	Apps	Goals	Apps	Goals	Apps	Goals	Apps	Goals
Young Lions	2010	??	??	1	0	??	??	—		1	0
Young Lions	2011	??	??	20	??	??	??	—		??	??
Young Lions	2012	??	??	??	??	??	??	—		??	??
Young Lions	2013	14	1	1	0	3	1	—		18	2
Young Lions	2014	18	9	-	-	-	-	—		18	9
Young Lions	Total	32	10	2	0	3	1	0	0	37	11
Club	Season	Malaysia Super League		Malaysia FA Cup		Malaysia Cup		Asia		Total	
LionsXII	2015	??	??	??	??	??	??	—		??	??
LionsXII	Total	??	??	??	??	??	??	??	??	??	??
Club	Season	S.League		Singapore Cup		Singapore League Cup		Asia		Total	
Geylang International	2016	21	5	3	2	0	0	—		24	7
Geylang International	Total	21	5	3	2	0	0	0	0	24	7
Tampines Rovers	2017	0	0	0	0	0	0	4	0	4	0
Tampines Rovers	Total	0	0	0	0	0	0	4	0	4	0
Club	Season	Malaysia Super League		Malaysia FA Cup		Malaysia Cup		Asia		Total	
Sarawak FA	2017	10	1	0	0	4	0	—		14	1
Sarawak FA	Total	10	1	0	0	4	0	0	0	14	1
Club	Season	S.League		Singapore Cup		Singapore League Cup		Asia		Total	
Warriors FC	2018	21	1	1	0	0	0	—		22	1
Warriors FC	2019	21	5	5	4	0	0	—		26	9
Warriors FC	Total	42	6	6	4	0	0	0	0	48	10
Hougang United	2020	4	1	0	0	1	0	3	0	8	1
Hougang United	2021	0	0	0	0	0	0	0	0	0	0
Hougang United	2022	25	4	6	4	0	0	2	2	33	10
Hougang United	2023	24	2	0	0	1	0	0	0	25	2
Hougang United	Total	53	7	6	4	2	0	5	2	66	13
Tanjong Pagar United	2024-25	30	4	4	0	0	0	0	0	34	4
Tanjong Pagar United	Total	30	4	4	0	0	0	0	0	34	4
Career Total		188	23	21	10	9	1	9	2	227	36

- Young Lions and LionsXII are ineligible for qualification to AFC competitions in their respective leagues.
- Career total excludes LionsXII matches.

=== International caps ===
No	Date	Venue	Opponent	Result	Competition
20	10 July 2016	National Stadium, Singapore	Malaysia	0–0 (draw)	Friendly
21	21 Sept 2022	Thống Nhất Stadium, Ho Chi Minh City, Vietnam	Vietnam	0–4 (lost)	2022 VFF Tri-Nations Series
22	23 March 2023	Mong Kok Stadium, Hong Kong	Hong Kong	1–1 (draw)	Friendly
23	26 March 2023	Macau Olympic Complex Stadium, Macau	Macau	1–0 (won)	Friendly

=== International goals ===
Scores and results list goal tally first.

No	Date	Venue	Opponent	Score	Result	Competition
1	6 September 2014	Hougang Stadium, Hougang, Singapore	Papua New Guinea	1–0	2–1	Friendly

=== U23 International goals ===
No	Date	Venue	Opponent	Score	Result	Competition
1	2 December 2013	Hougang Stadium, Singapore	Philippines	6–0	Won	International Friendly
2	8 December 2013	Zayyarthiri Stadium, Myanmar	Laos	1–1	Draw	2013 SEA Games
3	10 December 2013	Zayyarthiri Stadium, Myanmar	Vietnam	1–0	Won	2013 SEA Games
4	13 December 2013	Zayyarthiri Stadium, Myanmar	Brunei	2–0	Won	2013 SEA Games
5	6 August 2014	Al-Ahli Stadium, Qatar	Bahrain	3–2	Won	International Friendly
6	13 December 2014	Hwaseong Stadium, South Korea	Oman	3–3	Draw	2014 Asian Games
7	8 June 2015	Jalan Besar Stadium, Singapore	Cambodia	3–1	Won	2015 Southeast Asian Games

Singapore national team
Year	Apps	Goals
2013	2	0
2014	5	1
Total	7	1

Statistics accurate as of match played 5 March 2014

== Honours ==
=== Club ===
Hougang United

- Singapore Cup: 2022

=== International ===
Singapore

- Southeast Asian Games:

- Bronze Medal: 2013
