= Predrag Počuča =

Croatian-Serbian footballer

Personal information
- Date of birth: 24 January 1986 (age 40)
- Place of birth: Ogulin, SFR Yugoslavia
- Height: 1.88 m (6 ft 2 in)
- Position: Centre-back

Senior career*
Years	Team	Apps	(Gls)
2003–2004	Železnik		
2004	Dorćol		
2005	Žarkovo		
2005–2007	Sopron		
2008	Monori SE		
2009–2012	UTA Arad	48	(2)
2012–2013	Besa Kavajë	17	(1)
2014	Sabah		
2015	Tampines Rovers	23	(1)
2016–2017	BSK Borča	11	(0)
2017	Inđija	9	(0)
2018	Sinđelić Beograd	9	(0)
2018	KÍ Klaksvík	4	(0)
- * Club domestic league appearances and goals

Predrag Počuča (born 24 January 1986) is a Croatian-Serbian former professional footballer who played as a centre-back.

== Career ==
Born in Ogulin, SR Croatia, back in Yugoslavia, Počuča played for Serbian clubs FK Železnik, FK Dorćol and FK Žarkovo, before going to Hungary to play with FC Sopron, UTA Arad and KS Besa Kavaje in Europe. In Asia, he played for the 2014 Malaysia Premier League side Sabah FA under head of coach, his compatriot, Milomir Šešlija.

Počuča's contract with Faroese side Klaksvíkar Ítróttarfelag was ended at the end of the 2018 season.
