= 2015 Malaysia FA Cup =

Piala FA

Tournament details
- Country: Malaysia; Singapore
- Teams: 34

Final positions
- Champions: LionsXII (1st title)
- Runners-up: Kelantan FA

Awards
- Best player: Izwan Mahbud (LionsXII)

The 2015 Malaysia FA Cup (2015 XOX Piala FA) was the 26th season of the Malaysia FA Cup, a knockout competition for Malaysia's state football association and clubs. Pahang were the defending champions after beating FELDA United 2–1 the previous season.

34 teams entered this year's competition. Four teams entered at the 1st stage with two clubs making the round of 32. The draw for the competition was made on 14 December 2014 with games starting in February 2015. Also starting in 2015, the finalists of the previous Piala FA have not been permitted with byes.

Singapore's LionsXII won the Piala FA title for the first time after defeating two-time winners, Kelantan FA in the final with a score of 3–1. This marks the first time a foreign team has won the competition since its inception in 1990.

== Matches ==
=== Bracket ===
1st Round
Pahang | 1(4)
(Johor) JDT | 1(2)
(Penang) Sungai Ara | 0
(Kuala Lumpur) MISC-MIFA | 1
(Negeri Sembilan) NS Matrix | 2
(Selangor) UiTM | 0
Penang | 1
Perlis | 0
(Penang) PBAPP | 1
(Selangor) Sime Darby | 5
(Malaysia) PDRM | 3
Sabah | 0
Sarawak | 1
Kelantan | 2
(Putrajaya) MOF | 1
Kuala Lumpur | 3
(Kuala Lumpur) FELDA United | 2(2)
Selangor | 2(4)
Malacca United | 1
Terengganu | 3
(Pahang) Shahzan Muda | 1
Perak | 3
(Terengganu) T-Team | 3
ATM | 0
Kedah United | 0
(Singapore) LionsXII | 4
(Putrajaya) SPA | 3
(Pahang) Kuantan | 0
(Terengganu) Hanelang | 0
Kedah | 1
(Johor) JDT II | 2
(Selangor) PKNS | 1

2nd Round
Pahang | 2
(Kuala Lumpur) MISC-MIFA | 1
(Negeri Sembilan) NS Matrix | 1
Penang | 2
(Selangor) Sime Darby | 4
(Malaysia) PDRM | 2
Kelantan | 1
Kuala Lumpur | 0
Selangor | 1
Terengganu | 3
Perak | 2
(Terengganu) T-Team | 1
(Singapore) LionsXII | 4
(Putrajaya) SPA | 0
Kedah | 0
(Johor) JDT II | 1

Quarter-finals
Pahang | 2 | 2 | 4
Penang | 0 | 2 | 2
(Selangor) Sime Darby | 1 | 0 | 1
Kelantan | 1 | 3 | 4
Terengganu | 1 | 2 | 3
Perak | 1 | 0 | 1
(Singapore) LionsXII | 2 | 2 | 4
(Johor) JDT II | 0 | 0 | 0

Semi-finals
Pahang | 1 | 1 | 2
Kelantan | 0 | 3 | 3
Terengganu | 1 | 3 | 4
(Singapore) LionsXII | 2 | 2 | 4 (a)

Final
Kelantan | 1
(Singapore) LionsXII | 3

=== Play-off round ===
| 1 February | Harimau Muda C (Malaysia) | 2–2 (a.e.t.) (3–5 p) | Kuala Lumpur FA | Maybank Stadium, Bangi, Selangor |
| 16:45 UTC+08:00 | Danial Asyraf 45,55' | | Soné 61' Ekoule 66' |

| 1 February | DRB-Hicom (Perak) | 0–2 | (Selangor) PKNS | Proton City Stadium, Tanjung Malim, Perak |
| 16:45 UTC+08:00 | | | Farderin 59', 63' |

=== Round of 32 ===
The first round commenced on 27, 28 February & 2 March 2015.

| Monday 2 March | Pahang | 1–1 (a.e.t.) (4–2 p) | (Johor) JDT | Darul Makmur Stadium, Kuantan, Pahang |
| 20:45 UTC+08:00 | Conti 20' | | Hariss 80' | Attendance: 21,970; Referee: Wan Tarmizi Wan Ibrahim |
| | Penalties |
| | Conti (penalty scored); Stewart (penalty scored); Zesh Rehman (penalty scored); Razman (penalty scored) | | (penalty missed) Figueroa; (penalty scored) Safee; (penalty scored) Hariss; (penalty missed) Eldstal |

| Friday 27 February | Sungai Ara (Penang) | 0–1 | (Malaysia) MISC-MIFA | Penang City Stadium, George Town, Pulau Pinang |
| 20:45 UTC+08:00 | | | Muhammad Fuzi 25' | Attendance: 693; Referee: Mohd Sarif Tahir |

| Friday 27 February | NS Matrix (Negeri Sembilan) | 2–0 | (Selangor) UiTM | Tuanku Abdul Rahman Stadium, Paroi, Negeri Sembilan |
| 20:45 UTC+08:00 | Doe 21', 81' | | | Attendance: 3,504; Referee: Azman Jamaluddin |

| Friday 27 February | Sime Darby (Selangor) | 5–1 | (Penang) PBAPP | Selayang Stadium, Selayang, Selangor |
| 20:45 UTC+08:00 | Vidaković 11', 23', 56'; Sharofetdinov 41'; Perović 54' | | Azri 30' | Attendance: 300; Referee: Shaharudin Man |

| Friday 27 February | PDRM | 3–0 | Sabah | Shah Alam Stadium, Shah Alam, Selangor |
| 20:45 UTC+08:00 | Ashfaq 27'; Traoré 40', 45' | | | Attendance: 1,000; Referee: Muhd Nazmi Nasaruddin |

| Friday 27 February | Sarawak | 1–2 | Kelantan | Sarawak Stadium, Kuching, Sarawak |
| 20:45 UTC+08:00 | Griffiths 30' | | Carrillo 2'; Kenmogne 64' | Attendance: 15,750; Referee: Syed Azhar Syed Kamar |

| Friday 27 February | MOF (Putrajaya) | 1–3 | Kuala Lumpur | INSPEN Stadium, Bangi, Selangor |
| 20:45 UTC+08:00 | Juffry Omopor 63' | | Shamirul 24'; Kallé Soné 74'; Saufi 90+2' | Attendance: 1,000; Referee: Ahmad Zuhaidi Dzulkifli |

| Saturday 28 February | Malacca United | 1–3 | Terengganu | Hang Jebat Stadium, Melaka |
| 20:45 UTC+08:00 | Nurshamil 88' (pen.) | | Manaf 47'; Paulo Rangel 52', 72' (pen.); Azlan Zainal (red card) 74' | Attendance: 15,000; Referee: Mohd Jefri Zolkefli |

| Saturday 28 February | FELDA United (Kuala Lumpur) | 2–2 (a.e.t.) (2–4 p) | Selangor | Selayang Stadium, Selayang, Selangor |
| 20:45 UTC+08:00 | Miladinović 47' (pen.); Makeche 51' | | Hazwan 78'; Guilherme 88'; Andik (red card) 102' | Attendance: 7,328; Referee: Nagor Amir Nagor Mohamad |
| | Penalties |
| | Makeche (penalty missed); Wilson (penalty missed); Miladinović (penalty scored); Shahrulnizam (penalty scored) | | (penalty scored) Guilherme; (penalty scored) Hadi; (penalty scored) K. Gurusamy; (penalty scored) Cornthwaite |

| Saturday 28 February | Penang | 1–0 | Perlis | Penang City Stadium, George Town, Pulau Pinang |
| 20:45 UTC+08:00 | Faiz Subri 70' | | | Attendance: 5,781; Referee: Mohd Nazri Saptu |

| Saturday 28 February | Shahzan Muda (Pahang) | 1–3 | Perak | Temerloh Mini Stadium, Temerloh, Pahang |
| 16:15 UTC+08:00 | Sukri Jaafar 28' | | Namkung 5', 48'; Marco Tulio 45+1' | Attendance: 231; Referee: Ramli Mat Dahlan |

| Saturday 28 February | T-Team (Terengganu) | 3–0 (a.e.t.) | ATM | Sultan Ismail Nasiruddin Shah Stadium, Kuala Terengganu, Terengganu |
| 20:45 UTC+08:00 | Tadjiyev 101', 113'; Safawi Rasid 110' | | | Attendance: 493; Referee: Suhaizi Shukri |

| Saturday 28 February | Kedah United | 0–4 | (Singapore) LionsXII | Darul Aman Stadium, Alor Star, Kedah |
| 20:45 UTC+08:00 | | | Afiq 36'; Sahil 47', 83'; Gabriel 62' | Attendance: 400; Referee: Wan Zainuddin Wan Harun |

| Saturday 28 February | SPA (Putrajaya) | 3–0 | (Pahang) Kuantan | MBPJ Stadium, Petaling Jaya, Selangor |
| 16:15 UTC+08:00 | Chukwubunna 56', 64', 80' | | | Attendance: 120; Referee: Sani Tari |

| Friday 27 February | Hanelang F.C. (Terengganu) | 0–1 | Kedah | Sultan Ismail Nasiruddin Shah Stadium, Kuala Terengganu, Terengganu |
| 16:15 UTC+08:00 | | | Farhan 35' | Attendance: 450; Referee: Saiful Mohd Rodzali |

| Saturday 28 February | JDT II (Johor) | 2–1 | (Selangor) PKNS | Pasir Gudang Stadium, Pasir Gudang, Johor |
| 20:45 UTC+08:00 | Velázquez 61'; Ishak 90' | | Ogawa 1'; Khairu Azrin (red card) 65'; Ronaldinho (red card) 90+3'; Mohd Fazli (red card) 90+4' | Attendance: 8,298; Referee: Zulkifli Ahmad |

=== Round of 16 ===
The second round commenced on 17, 18 & 21 March 2015.

| 17 March 2015 | NS Matrix (Negeri Sembilan) | 1–2 | Penang | Tuanku Abdul Rahman Stadium, Paroi, Negeri Sembilan |
| 20:45 UTC+08:00 | Shahrizal Saad 3' | | Beto Gonçalves 13'; Lee Kil-hoon 80' | Attendance: 5,066; Referee: Wan Mohd Tarmizi Wan Ibrahim |

| 17 March 2015 | Sime Darby (Selangor) | 4–2 | PDRM | Selayang Stadium, Selayang, Selangor |
| 20:45 UTC+08:00 | Dilshod Sharofetdinov 45'; Ivan Dragičević 50'; Nemanja Vidaković 76', 80' | | Dramane Traoré 1'; Mamadou Sumareh 65' | Attendance: 750; Referee: Lismotia Mohem Mohd Tisan |

| 17 March 2015 | Kelantan | 1–0 | Kuala Lumpur | Sultan Mohammad IV Stadium, Kota Bharu, Kelantan |
| 20:45 UTC+08:00 | Wan Zack Haikal 66' | | | Attendance: 10,000; Referee: Mohd Jeffri Zolkifli |

| 17 March 2015 | Perak | 2–1 | (Terengganu) T-Team | Perak Stadium, Ipoh, Perak |
| 20:45 UTC+08:00 | Namkung Woong 17', 32' | | Farhod Tadjiyev 15' | Attendance: 5,000; Referee: Muhammad Nazmi Nasarudin |

| 17 March 2015 | Kedah | 0–1 | (Johor) JDT II | Darul Aman Stadium, Alor Star, Kedah |
| 20:45 UTC+08:00 | | | Akram Mahinan 88' | Attendance: 9,448; Referee: Samsudin Ibrahim |

| 18 March 2015 | Selangor | 1–3 (a.e.t.) | Terengganu | Shah Alam Stadium, Shah Alam, Selangor |
| 20:45 UTC+08:00 | Guilherme 21' | | Bikana 89'; Cornthwaite 104' (o.g.); Zairo Anuar 120' | Attendance: 14,300; Referee: Zamzaidi Katimin |

| 21 March 2015 | Pahang | 2–1 | (Malaysia) MISC-MIFA | Darul Makmur Stadium, Kuantan, Pahang |
| 20:45 UTC+08:00 | Gopinathan 49'; Fauzi 54' | | Harivarman 90+1' | Attendance: 5,400; Referee: Ahmad Zuhaidi Dzulkifli |

| 21 March 2015 | LionsXII (Singapore) | 4–0 | (Putrajaya) SPA | Jalan Besar Stadium, Kallang, Singapore |
| 19:45 UTC+08:00 | Madhu 16'; Khairul Amri 26', 84'; Gabriel Quak 57' | | | Attendance: 3,801; Referee: Lismotia Mohen Mohd Tisen |

=== Quarter-finals ===
==== First leg ====
The first leg matches commenced on 7 & 8 April 2015.

| 7 April 2015 | Pahang | 2–0 | Penang | Darul Makmur Stadium, Kuantan, Pahang |
| 20:45 UTC+08:00 | Hafiz Kamal 9'; Nwakaeme 14' | | | Attendance: 8,500; Referee: Mohd Amirul Izwan Yaacob |

| 7 April 2015 | Sime Darby (Selangor) | 1–1 | Kelantan | Selayang Stadium, Selayang, Selangor |
| 20:45 UTC+08:00 | Vidaković 45+2' | | Carrillo 45' | Attendance: 5,000; Referee: Mohd Nafeez Abdul Wahab |

| 7 April 2015 | Terengganu | 1–1 | Perak | Sultan Ismail Nasiruddin Shah Stadium, Kuala Terengganu, Terengganu |
| 20:45 UTC+08:00 | Ismail Faruqi (red card) 57'; Paulo Rangel 90+5' (pen.) | | Zubir Azmi 45' (o.g.) | Attendance: 8,782; Referee: Muhd Nazmi Nasaruddin |

| 8 April 2015 | LionsXII (Singapore) | 2–0 | (Johor) JDT II | Jalan Besar Stadium, Kallang, Singapore |
| 19:45 UTC+08:00 | Khairul Amri 4' van Huizen 90+2' | | Baihakki (yellow card) 45+1' (yellow-red card) 81' | Attendance: 3,828; Referee: Wan Mohamad Tarmizi Wan Ibrahim |

==== Second leg ====
The second leg matches commenced on 21 & 22 April.

| 21 April 2015 | Kelantan | 3–0 (4–1 agg.) | (Selangor) Sime Darby | Sultan Mohammad IV Stadium, Kota Bharu, Kelantan |
| 20:45 UTC+08:00 | Badhri 40' (pen.); Amutu 57'; Carrillo 74' | | | Attendance: 5,000; Referee: Samsudin Ibrahim |

| 21 April 2015 | Perak | 0–2 (1–3 agg.) | Terengganu | Perak Stadium, Ipoh, Perak |
| 20:45 UTC+08:00 | | | Paulo Rangel 21'; Nakajima-Farran 56' | Attendance: 5,000; Referee: Wan Mohd Tarmizi Wan Ibrahim |

| 22 April 2015 | Penang | 2–2 (2–4 agg.) | Pahang | City Stadium, George Town, Penang |
| 20:45 UTC+08:00 | Moreira 75', 87' | | Nwakaeme 6', 10' |

| 22 April 2015 | JDT II (Johor) | 0–2 (0–4 agg.) | (Singapore) LionsXII | Pasir Gudang Stadium, Pasir Gudang, Johor |
| 20:45 UTC+08:00 | | | Khairul Nizam 20'; Nazrul Nazari 65' |

=== Semi-finals ===
==== First leg ====
The first leg matches commenced on 9 May 2015.

| 9 May 2015 | Pahang | 1–0 | Kelantan | Darul Makmur Stadium, Kuantan, Pahang |
| 20:45 UTC+08:00 | Matías Conti 2' | | | Attendance: 31,663; Referee: Nagor Amir Noor Mohamamed |

| 9 May 2015 | LionsXII (Singapore) | 2–1 | Terengganu | Jalan Besar Stadium, Kallang, Singapore |
| 19:45 UTC+08:00 | Khairul Nizam 30'; Faris Ramli 34' | | Gustavo López 39' | Attendance: 5,891; Referee: Mohd Zamzaidi Katimin |

==== Second leg ====
The second leg matches commenced on 16 May 2015.

| 16 May 2015 | Kelantan | 3–1 (3–2 agg.) | Pahang | Sultan Muhammad IV Stadium, Kota Bharu, Kelantan |
| 20:45 UTC+08:00 | Wan Zaharulnizam 18'; Austin Amutu 74', 90+2' | | Azamuddin Akil (red card) 33'; R. Gopinathan 58' | Attendance: 14,253; Referee: Suhaizi Shukri |

| 16 May 2015 | Terengganu | 3–2 (4–4(a) agg.) | (Singapore) LionsXII | Sultan Mizan Zainal Abidin Stadium, Kuala Nerus, Terengganu |
| 20:45 UTC+08:00 | Paulo Rangel 22', 45+2' (red card) 90'; Norshahrul Idlan 60'; Gustavo López (yellow card) 90+3' (red card) 90+3' | | Khairul Amri 18', 28' | Attendance: 30,000; Referee: Mohd Amirul Izwan Yaacob |

== Final ==
| 23 May 2015 | Kelantan | 1–3 | (Singapore) LionsXII | Bukit Jalil National Stadium, Kuala Lumpur, Malaysia |
| 20:45 UTC+08:00 | Wan Zack Haikal 62' | | Faris Ramli 7'; Sahil Suhaimi 81', 90++' |
