= Khairul Amri =

Singaporean footballer (born 1985)

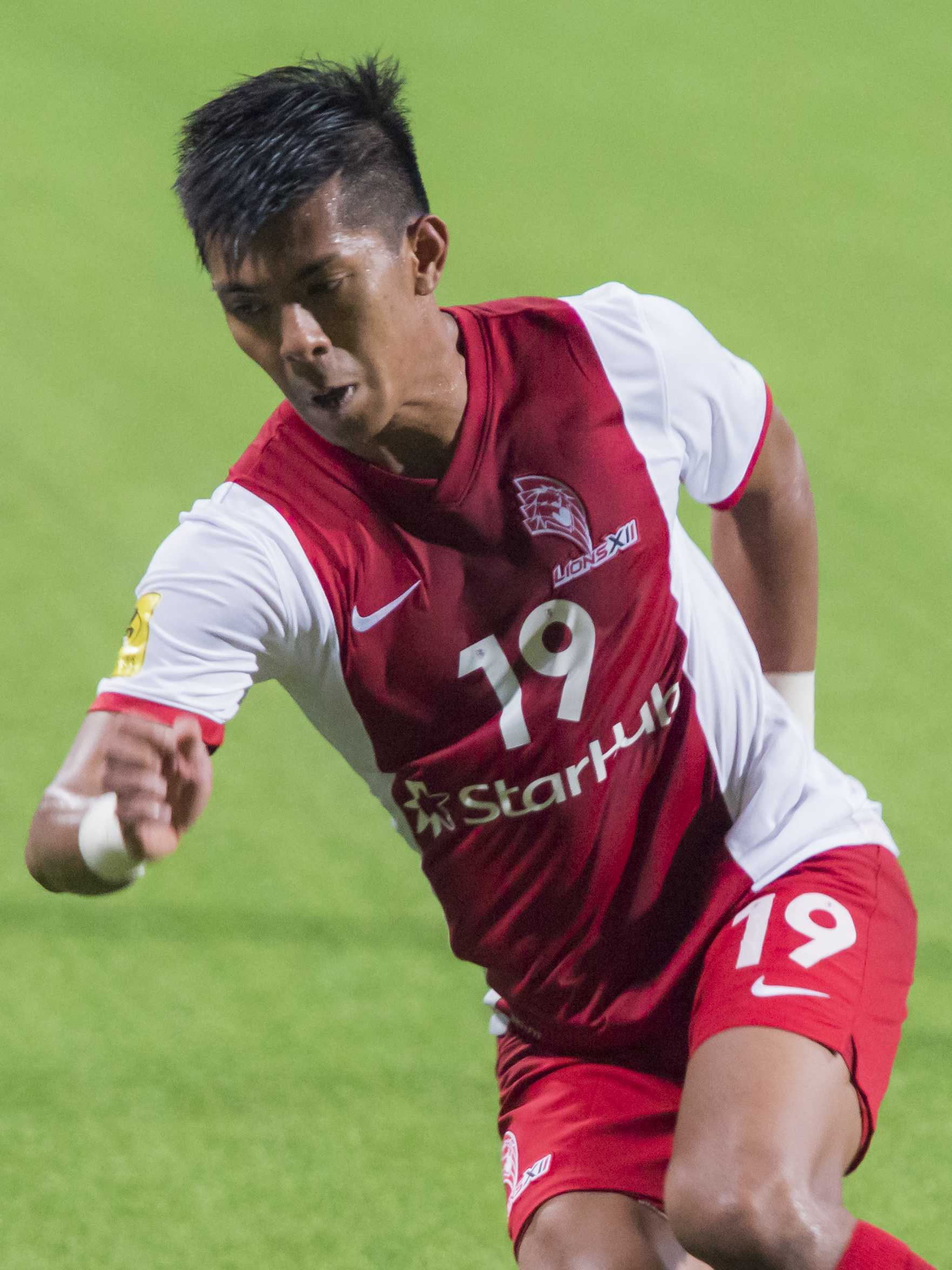
- Khairul playing for LionsXII against Kelantan in 2014

Personal information
- Full name: Mohammad Khairul Amri bin Mohammad Kamal
- Date of birth: 14 March 1985 (age 41)
- Place of birth: Singapore
- Height: 1.75 m (5 ft 9 in)
- Position: Forward

Youth career
- 2000–2003: National Football Academy

Senior career*
Years	Team	Apps	(Gls)
2004–2008	Young Lions	56	(34)
2008–2009	Tampines Rovers	51	(23)
2010–2011	Persiba Balikpapan	23	(9)
2012	LionsXII	27	(21)
2013	Tampines Rovers	26	(11)
2014–2015	LionsXII	48	(35)
2016	Young Lions	23	(15)
2017–2019	Tampines Rovers	51	(32)
2019–2020	Felda United	13	(8)
2021–2023	Tanjong Pagar United	60	(13)
Total		441	(241)

International career
2004–2019	Singapore	136	(32)
Medal record
Men's football
Representing Singapore
Sea Games
Bronze medal – third place	Sea Games 2007	Football
Asean Football Championship
Winner	AFF Suzuki Cup 2004	2004
Winner	AFF Suzuki Cup 2007	2007
Winner	AFF Suzuki Cup 2012	2012
- * Club domestic league appearances and goals

Mohammad Khairul Amri bin Mohammad Kamal (born 14 March 1985) is a Singaporean former footballer who plays as a striker or winger. He is known for his pace, sharp dribbling skills and his powerful shot with either foot. He was named the first ever Lions' Player of the Year for his performance in the 2006 S.League season on 4 January 2007. He is the older brother of Khairul Nizam who was a former footballer who played as a winger or striker for Singapore Premier League club Tanjong Pagar United F.C.

== Club career ==
=== Young Lions ===
Along with Baihakki Khaizan, Shahril Ishak and Hassan Sunny, Khairul Amri was in the pioneer batch of the National Football Academy graduates in 2000.

Khairul Amri had begun his professional footballing career at S.League club Young Lions in 2004.

The 2006 S.League season was a breakthrough season for the youngster, scoring more than 20 goals in all competitions, including a 4-bagger in a FA Cup Malaysia match. Khairul Amri was amongst the top scorers in the 2006 season of the S.League and many of his goals have come from free kicks. He went on to captain the Young Lions team in 2007 after then-captain Baihakki Khaizan left to join Geylang International.

In total, he scored 34 goals in 56 appearances before leaving the club.

=== Tampines Rovers ===
In the mid-season transfer window of the 2008 S.League season, Khairul Amri moved to Tampines Rovers and capped off the season by winning the S-League's Young Player of The Year. However, he sustained a metatarsal injury in the 88th minute of the third-place play-offs of the 2008 Singapore Cup against his former club, the Young Lions, which ultimately ruled him out of action for two months.

=== Persiba Balikpapan ===
In 2010, Khairul Amri moved overseas for the first time to join Indonesian football club Persiba Balikpapan. Khairul Amri substantiated his decision to join the Indonesian side on the fact that it was a rare opportunity, not just for him to prove himself overseas as a footballer, but also to expand the profile of Singaporean football. The move would also allow Khairul Amri to be exposed to a different type of challenge as he had already been playing in the S.League for 5 years.

Khairul Amri made a dream start to his foreign stint as he managed to score on his debut appearance. He, however, tore one of his leg muscles and was sidelined for approximately 7 to 8 months during a match, halfway through the season. Due to the severity of the injury, Khairul Amri's stint with the Indonesian Super League side was a short-lived one. He finished his only season with Persiba Balikpapan with 9 goals in 23 matches.

Khairul Amri had originally been slated to stay for a longer period with Persiba Balikpapan. Prior to the match that caused his knee injury, the management team had proposed a contract extension to him. However, he had told the staff to wait until the end of the game. The injury however, proved a serious issue as the club could not afford to keep Khairul Amri on the sidelines for an extended period of time. During his recovery from the knee injury, Khairul Amri spent his time recuperating with Gombak United, at the offer of club chairman John Yap.

=== LionsXII ===
During his recuperation, Khairul Amri was introduced to the LionsXII project by the Football Association of Singapore. In November 2011, Khairul Amri agreed to join the LionsXII squad and played for the club in the 2012 Malaysia Super League (MSL). He finished the season as the club second highest scorer with 8 goals in 27 appearances behind Sharil Ishak who scored 14 goals in 31 appearances.

=== Tampines Rovers ===
Amri later signed for Tampines Rovers in 2013. He scored 12 goals for the Stags in the league, finishing the season as the joint-top local scorer in the 2013 S.League and winning his first S.League title.

=== LionsXII ===
Khairul Amri returned to the LionsXII setup once again for the 2014 Malaysia Super League season. He scored seven goals in 24 appearances for his team.

He started the 2015 Malaysia Super League strongly, scoring 10 goals in 25 appearances for his team, including a hat-trick in a 4–1 win against Sime Darby. His fine form was rewarded as he won the May Player of the month award. However, in October 2015, his knee injury struck again, forcing him to miss the rest of the season.

=== Young Lions ===
After the LionsXII was disbanded following the conclusion of the 2015 Malaysia Super League season, Amri signed on a two-year contract with the Young Lions for the 2016 S.League season as one of three overage players, together with Firdaus Kasman and Christopher van Huizen. He was also named as the captain of the team. However, he was forced to miss out the opening weeks of the season due to an injury. Khairul only eventually made his first appearance in April, 5 months after his last competitive match. Khairul's injury ravage season saw him score only 5 goals all season.

=== Tampines Rovers ===
After an early end to his two-year contract with the Young Lions, Amri was chased by a few sides, including Tampines and Hougang United. Khairul opted to sign for his former side in the end, joining the Stags for a third time.

He made his re-debut for the Stags in a 2017 AFC Champions League qualifying play-off against Filippino side Global FC and had a chance to net on his debut but his penalty was pushed away by the goalkeeper as the Stags crash out following a 2–0 defeat. His first appearance in the league, which was also a Singapore Community Shield match, ended in a similarly disappointing fashion as he came off the bench in a 2–1 defeat by Albirex Niigata Singapore FC. Khairul came off the bench and scored the winner and his first goal of the season during the Stags' first game of the 2017 AFC Cup campaign. He scored his first goal in the league in a 2–1 win over Hougang United FC.

His next goals came in a 1–3 win over Felda United, where he scored a brace in 4 minutes, which kept Tampines in the hunt for a spot in the next round. His exploits against Felda in a 24 minutes cameo earned him recognition as he was named the Fans' Asian Player of the week. He continued to prove himself as the team's talisman as he scored the only goal in the next game, a 1–0 win over his former club, Young Lions, to push his team to 3rd place in the league.

He has committed his future to the club by signing a three-year extension, starting from the 2018 season. However, Amri decided to leave the Stags for Malaysia, after catching the eye of Pahang-based club, Felda United who were impressed by the veteran who had scored 8 goals in the opening months of the Stags' 2019 campaign.

=== Felda United ===
Amri left Tampines Rovers midway through the 2019 Singapore Premier League season to join Malaysia Super League side Felda United, signing a 1 1/2-year deal for the club rooted at the bottom of the table. Amri. however, managed to help his side to safety, with the club eventually finishing in 10th place, starving off relegation.

=== Tanjong Pagar United ===
In 2021, Amri joined Tanjong Pagar United. He ended his 2022 campaign with 6 goals and 3 assists in 24 appearance for the club.

On 6 April 2023, Amri, the oldest outfield player in the 2023 Singapore Premier League at age 38, eluded the Hougang defence just enough to launch a spectacular scissors-kick volley to sweep the ball home.

== Career statistics ==
=== Club ===
As of 6 Nov 2020

Club	Season	League			FA Cup		Malaysia Cup		Continental		Total	
Club	Season	Division	Apps	Goals	Apps	Goals	Apps	Goals	Apps	Goals	Apps	Goals
LionsXII	2012	Malaysia Super League	6	0	0	0	9	2	0	0	15	2
Club	Season	League			Singapore Cup		League Cup		Continental		Total	
Club	Season	Division	Apps	Goals	Apps	Goals	Apps	Goals	Apps	Goals	Apps	Goals
Tampines Rovers	2013	S.League	26	11	1	0	1	1	0	0	28	12
Club	Season	League			FA Cup		Malaysia Cup		Continental		Total	
Club	Season	Division	Apps	Goals	Apps	Goals	Apps	Goals	Apps	Goals	Apps	Goals
LionsXII	2014	Malaysia Super League	17	7	1	0	0	0	0	0	18	7
LionsXII	2015	Malaysia Super League	?	?	?	0	0	0	0	0	30	28
LionsXII	Total		41	24	4	2	0	0	0	0	48	35
Club	Season	League			Singapore Cup		League Cup		Continental		Total	
Club	Season	Division	Apps	Goals	Apps	Goals	Apps	Goals	Apps	Goals	Apps	Goals
Young Lions	2016	S.League	23	15	0	0	0	0	0	0	23	15
Total		23	15	0	0	0	0	0	0	23	15	
Tampines Rovers	2017	S.League	14	6	2	0	0	0	6	3	22	9
Tampines Rovers	2018	Singapore Premier League	21	15	2	2	0	0	7	2	30	19
Tampines Rovers	2019	Singapore Premier League	6	3	0	0	0	0	5	5	11	8
Tampines Rovers	Total		41	24	4	2	0	0	18	10	63	36
Club	Season	League			FA Cup		Malaysia Cup		Continental		Total	
Club	Season	Division	Apps	Goals	Apps	Goals	Apps	Goals	Apps	Goals	Apps	Goals
Felda United	2019	Malaysia Super League	6	4	0	0	2	3	0	0	8	7
Felda United	2020	Malaysia Super League	9	3	0	0	1	0	0	0	10	3
Felda United	Total		15	7	0	0	3	3	0	0	18	10
Club	Season	League			Singapore Cup		League Cup		Continental		Total	
Club	Season	Division	Apps	Goals	Apps	Goals	Apps	Goals	Apps	Goals	Apps	Goals
Tanjong Pagar United	2021	Singapore Premier League	18	5	0	0	0	0	0	0	18	5
Tanjong Pagar United	2022	Singapore Premier League	22	5	2	1	0	0	0	0	24	6
Tanjong Pagar United	2023	Singapore Premier League	1	0	0	0	0	0	0	0	1	0
Tanjong Pagar United	Total		41	10	2	1	0	0	0	0	43	11
Career total			193	91	11	5	13	6	18	10	235	112

== International career ==
Khairul Amri represented Singapore at the international level, and has been capped at the U23, U18, U16 and senior levels.

He made his senior team debut against Oman in 2004. He scored in his first start in the first leg of the 2004 AFF Championship final against Indonesia. A few months later, he scored the opener in the 2–0 victory in the 2007 AFC Asian Cup qualifiers against Asian champions, Iraq with a freekick. He repeated the feat again in their next meeting although Singapore lost 4–2 this time.

In the 2007 AFF Championship, he netted a goal in the 11–0 win against Laos. He scored the late winner in the second leg of the final against Thailand, helping Singapore to clinch their third AFF Championship title.

He was part of the Singapore national under-23 team that took part in the 2007 Southeast Asian Games in Korat, Thailand that won a bronze medal.

During the 2008 Singapore Cup third place play-offs against the Young Lions, Khairul Amri sustained a metatarsal injury in the 88th minute and was sidelined for about two months, ruling him out of the 2008 AFF Championship, as well as the first two matches of the 2011 AFC Asian Cup Final qualifying matches against Iran and Jordan.

In 2011, Khairul Amri was unable to participate in the 2014 World Cup qualifiers because of the injury he sustained when he was playing for his club.

He was in the winning squad of the 2012 AFF Championship, scoring a free-kick 30 yards from goal against Laos, Philippines and also netting against Thailand in the final. Singapore went on to win 3–2 on aggregate.

He had a productive year in 2014, scoring 7 in 12 appearances for Singapore.

He scored his 32nd goal for Singapore in Singapore's disappointing 2016 AFF Championship, netting Singapore's only goal against Indonesia in a 1–2 defeat that saw the Lions crash out of the tournament.

=== International goals ===
Scores and results list goal tally first.

No	Date	Venue	Opponent	Score	Result	Competition
1	13 October 2004	Singapore	India	1–0	2–0	2006 World Cup qualifier
2	15 December 2004	Haiphong, Vietnam	Cambodia	1–0	3–0	2004 Tiger Cup
3	8 January 2005	Jakarta, Indonesia	Indonesia	1–1	3–1	2004 Tiger Cup
4	4 February 2006	Kuwait City, Kuwait	Kuwait	1–2	2–2	Friendly
5	22 February 2006	Singapore	Iraq	1–0	2–0	2007 Asian Cup qualifier
6	11 October 2006	Al-Ain, Iraq	Iraq	1–4	2–4	2007 Asian Cup qualifier
7	7 January 2007	Choa Chu Kang, Singapore	Philippines	1–1	4–1	Friendly
8	15 January 2007	Singapore	Laos	1–0	11–0	2007 AFF Championship
9	4 February 2007	Bangkok, Thailand	Thailand	1–1	1–1	2007 AFF Championship
10	21 August 2007	Shah Alam Stadium, Malaysia	Zimbabwe	2-0	4–2	2007 Merdeka Tournament
11	22 October 2009	Ho Chi Minh City, Vietnam	Turkmenistan	1-2	4–2	Friendly
13	16 October 2012	Singapore	Indonesia	1-0	2–0	Friendly
14	19 November 2012	Singapore	Pakistan	1–0	4–1	Friendly
15	1 December 2012	Shah Alam, Malaysia	Laos	1–3	4-3	2012 AFF Championship
16	12 December 2012	Singapore	Philippines	1–0	1–0	2012 AFF Championship
17	19 December 2012	Singapore	Thailand	1–1	3-1	2012 AFF Championship
18	4 June 2013	Yangon, Myanmar	Myanmar	1-0	2–0	Friendly
19	10 October 2013	Singapore	Laos	1-0	1–0	Friendly
20	15 October 2013	Singapore	Syria	1-1	2–1	2015 Asian Cup qualifier
21	4 February 2014	Singapore	Jordan	1-1	2–1	2015 Asian Cup qualifier
22	14 October 2014	Taipa, Macao	Macau	1-0	2–2	Friendly
23	14 October 2014	Taipa, Macao	Macau	2-0	2–2	Friendly
24	13 November 2014	Yishun, Singapore	Laos	1–0	2–0	Friendly
25	17 November 2014	Yishun, Singapore	Cambodia	1–2	4-2	Friendly
26	23 November 2014	Kallang, Singapore	Thailand	1–2	1-2	2014 AFF Championship
27	29 November 2014	Kallang, Singapore	Malaysia	1–1	1–3	2014 AFF Championship
28	30 May 2015	Dhaka, Bangladesh	Bangladesh	1–2	1-2	Friendly
29	6 June 2015	Jurong East, Singapore	Brunei	1–0	5–1	Friendly
30	6 June 2015	Jurong East, Singapore	Brunei	4–1	5–1	Friendly
31	11 June 2015	Phnom Penh, Cambodia	Cambodia	1–0	4–0	2018 FIFA World Cup qualification (AFC)
32	8 October 2015	Kallang, Singapore	Afghanistan	1–0	1–0	2018 FIFA World Cup qualification (AFC)
33	28 July 2016	Phnom Penh, Cambodia	Cambodia	1–1	1–2	Friendly
34	25 November 2016	Manila, Philippines	Indonesia	1–0	1–2	2016 AFF Championship

== Others ==
=== Singapore Selection squad ===
He was selected as part of the Singapore Selection squad for The Sultan of Selangor's Cup to be held on 6 May 2017.

== Personal life ==
Khairul Amri is the older brother of forward Khairul Nizam who plays for Home United and Singapore, and both have previously played alongside each other at LionsXII.

== Honours ==
Lions XII

- FA Cup Malaysia: 2015

Tampines Rovers

- S.League: 2013

Singapore

- AFF Championship: 2004, 2007, 2012
- Southeast Asian Games: Bronze Medal – 2007

Individual

- S.League People's Choice Award: 2006
- Lions' Player of the Year: 2006
- S.League Young Player of the Year: 2008

== See also ==
- List of men's footballers with 100 or more international caps
