= Mohammad Naeem Rahimi =

Afghan footballer

Naim Rahimi
Personal information
- Date of birth: 4 April 1994 (age 32)
- Place of birth: Shiraz, Iran
- Height: 5 ft 10 in (1.78 m)
- Position: Midfielder

Team information
- Current team: Kingston City

Youth career
- 1999–2010: Bankstown Berries

Senior career*
Years	Team	Apps	(Gls)
2010–2013	Bankstown Berries		
2014	Watanga		
2014	DRB-Hicom		
2015	Tampines Rovers	11	(1)
2016	Bankstown Berries	13	(0)
2017	Sydney Olympic	11	(1)
2018	Sydney United 58	8	(0)
2019–2021	Pascoe Vale	36	(1)
2022	Altona Magic SC	20	(1)
2023	Richmond SC		
2024–	Kingston City		

International career^{‡}
2019–	Afghanistan	11	(0)
- * Club domestic league appearances and goals as of 03:05, 30 November 2024 (UTC) ‡ National team caps and goals as of 03:05, 30 November 2024 (UTC)

Mohammad Naeem Rahimi (born 4 April 1994), also known as Naim Rahimi, is a footballer who plays as a midfielder for Kingston City. Born in Iran and raised in Australia, he represents the Afghanistan national team.

== Club career ==
Naim started his career in Australia with Bankstown Berries where he got promoted to the senior team in 2010.

After 14 years with Bankstown Berry, Naim moved to Liberia in March 2013 to signed with Liberian First Division club Watanga.

In March 2014, Naim moved to Malaysia to signed with second division club DRB-Hicom who is competing in the 2014 Malaysia Premier League.

In January 2015, Naim moved to Singapore to signed with S.League club Tampines Rovers. He make his debut for the club on 13 March in a 2–0 defeat to Home United. On 28 October, he scored the only goal which give Tampines Rovers the win over DPMM.

== International career ==
Naim made his debut for the Afghanistan national team on 25 December 2018 in a friendly against Turkmenistan.

In 2025, Naim was selected for the team squad that competes in the 2025 CAFA Nations Cup.
