= Christopher van Huizen =

Singaporean footballer (born 1992)

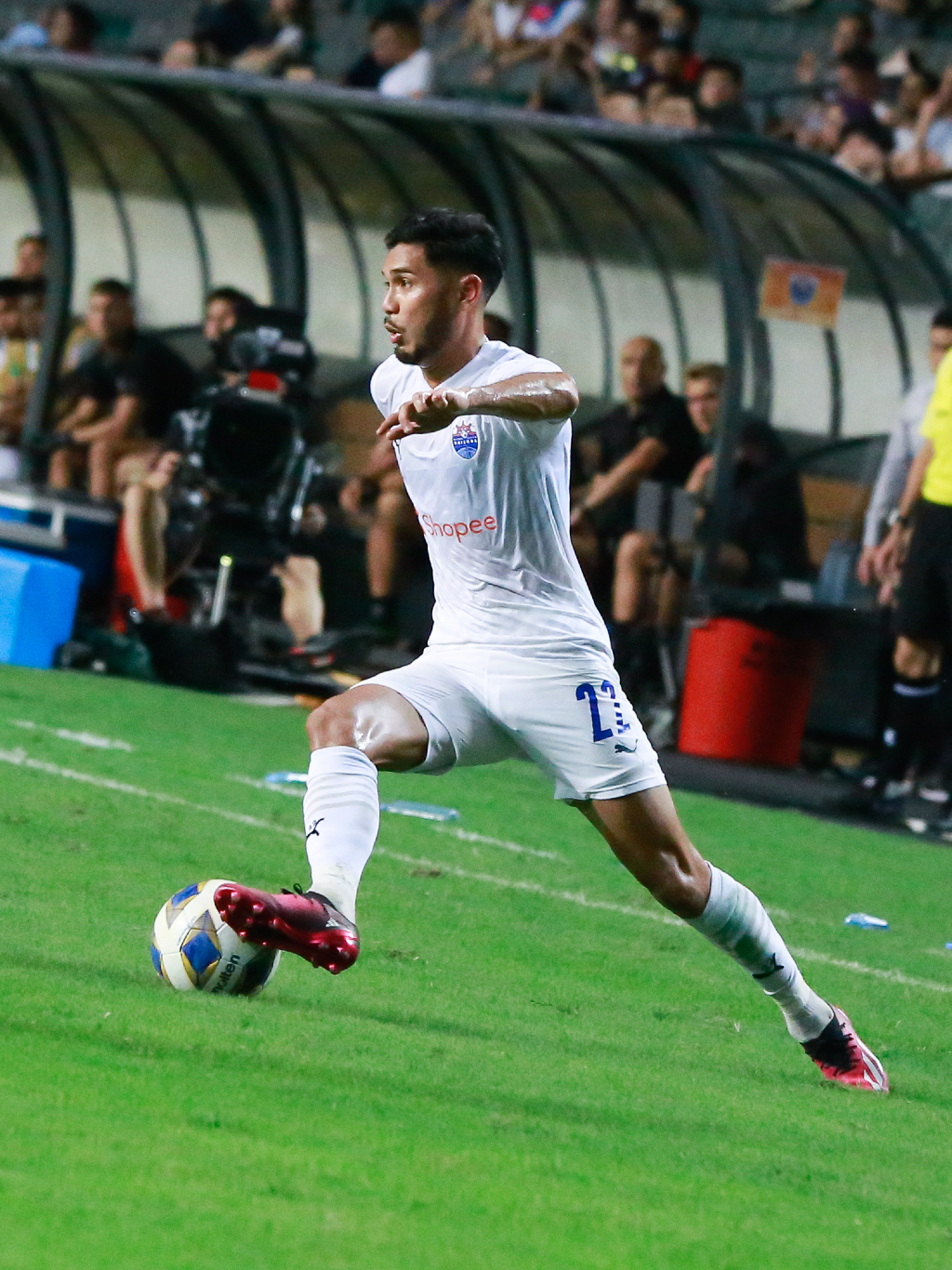
- Van Huizen in action for Lion City Sailors in the 2023–24 AFC Champions League

Personal information
- Full name: Christopher James van Huizen
- Date of birth: 28 November 1992 (age 33)
- Place of birth: Singapore
- Height: 1.71 m (5 ft 7 1/2 in)
- Position: Full-back

Team information
- Current team: FC Jurong
- Number: 32

Youth career
- –2010: Geylang United
- 2010–2012: Tampines Rovers

Senior career*
Years	Team	Apps	(Gls)
2013–2014	Tampines Rovers	4	(1)
2015	LionsXII	18	(3)
2016	Tampines Rovers	10	(1)
2016	Young Lions	6	(0)
2017–2018	Home United	21	(0)
2019–2021	Geylang International	53	(4)
2022	Tampines Rovers	11	(3)
2023–2026	Lion City Sailors	48	(2)
2026-	FC Jurong	0	(0)

International career
2014	Singapore U21		
2015–	Singapore	28	(1)
- * Club domestic league appearances and goals

Christopher James van Huizen (born 28 November 1992) is a Singaporean professional footballer who plays as a full-back for Singapore Premier League club FC Jurong and the Singapore national team.

== Club career ==
=== Youth career ===
Van Huizen went for trials with Geylang United when he was young and duly impressed the coaches at Geylang was rewarded with a place at the Geylang under-16 squad. In 2010, he joined rivals Tampines Rovers' Prime League squad when he turned 17 but saw his opportunity derailed by National Service in 2011. Van Huizen rejected the chance to play for the SAFSA team during his 2 years of service and almost gave up on continuing professional football.

A second chance came calling for Van Huizen when he entered the professional football scene in Singapore through his involvement in a MediaCorp Channel 5 TV series, First XI.

=== Tampines Rovers ===
Following his performance in the reality TV series and the completion of his national service, Tampines Rovers head coach Rafi Ali offered Van Huizen a two-year contract to play for both the Prime League squad and the senior squad that competes in the 2013 S.League.

Van Huizen scored his first professional career goal during the 2014 Singapore League Cup match against Police SA where he scored and assisted a goal in a 9–0 thrashing win on 19 July 2014. He also scored his first league goal in a 2–0 win over Woodlands Wellington on 31 July.

=== LionsXII ===
Alongside Sahil Suhaimi, Wahyudi Wayid and Izzdin Shafiq, Van Huizen was unveiled as one of the new LionsXII signings by Fandi Ahmad for the 2015 Malaysia Super League season. This marks a turnaround for the "boy from the reality series" to a potential national team player.

Van Huizen made his LionsXII debut as a substitute in the opening game of the season, coming on to make a brief cameo appearance against PDRM FA in a 5–3 victory for the Lions. He was part of the squad that won the 2015 Malaysia FA Cup.

=== Tampines Rovers ===
Following the exit of LionsXII from the Malaysia Super League, Van Huizen rejoined Tampines Rovers in January 2016. Van Huizen make his AFC Cup debut on 23 March 2016 against Bangladeshi club Shiekh Jamal in a 4–0 win. During a league match against DPMM on 19 March 2016, he assisted twice as Tampines Rovers went on to win 2–1. Van Huizen then scored his first goal of the season in a 1–2 win over Young Lions in the next match on 3 April, helping the Stags climb to joint-top of the 2016 S.League season.

=== Young Lions ===
On 1 July 2016, Van Huizen signed for Young Lions midway throughout the 2016 season. This was following a season at Tampines Rovers where he was used sparingly.

=== Home United ===
On 2 January 2017, Van Huizen signed for Home United. He made his debut for the club during the first leg of the 2017 AFC Cup qualifying play-offs against Cambodian club Phnom Penh Crown in a 4–3 away win on 30 January.

=== Geylang International ===
In January 2019, Van Huizen signed for his boyhood club, Geylang International ahead of the 2019 season. On 5 July, he raked up a brace of assist which helped his team settled to a 2–2 draw against Hougang United. In the next match against Home United on 12 July, Van Huizen again picked up a brace of assist, but that was not enough as Geylang suffered to a 3–2 defeat. On 30 August, he raked up his third brace of assist in the season which helped his team to win 2–1 against Young Lions. Van Huizen recorded 10 assists in the league leading the top assist chart in the 2019 season.

On 15 March 2020, Van Huizen scored a brace which helped his team to win 2–1 against Hougang United during a league match.

On 3 October 2021, Van Huizen recorded a hat-trick of assist in a 3–0 win over Balestier Khalsa which won him the 'man of the match' award. However, on 11 November 2021, he left Geylang International, considering retirement from football.

=== Tampines Rovers ===
In January 2022, Van Huizen was given another chance by his former club, Tampines Rovers and signed a one-year deal. He went on to make 27 appearances for the club where he scored 3 goals and assisted twice throughout the 2022 season.

=== Lion City Sailors ===
On 20 January 2023, Van Huizen signed for Lion City Sailors on an 18-month contract ahead of the 2023 season. On 13 August, he scored his first goal for the club in a massive 8–2 away victory against Hougang United. On 20 September, he made his 2023–24 AFC Champions League debut in a 2–1 lost against Thailand club Bangkok United. On 4 October, Van Huizen assisted Richairo Živković in the AFC Champions League group stage match to take the lead against Hong Kong side, Kitchee which would see Lion City Sailors ending up in a 2–1 away win. In his first season at the club, he won the 2023 Singapore Cup which is his first domestic trophy.

On 22 September 2024, Van Huizen scored his first goal of the 2024–25 season in a 3–1 win against Balestier Khalsa.

Van Huizen finished as a runner-up in the 2025 AFC Champions League Two final against Sharjah after a 1–2 defeat. In May 2026, Lion City Sailors announced that Van Huizen will not be extending his stay as a City Sailor, instead seeking pastures new elsewhere in the local ranks, looking for his level.

=== FC Jurong ===
On 27 June 2026, it was announced that Van Huizen had signed for FC Jurong from Lion City Sailors FC.

== International career ==
=== Youth ===
Having impressed in his first season in the 2014 S.League, Van Huizen was rewarded with a call-up to the Singapore under-21 squad, by Richard Bok, for the Thanh Niên Cup in Vietnam.

=== Senior ===
In 2015, Van Huizen was called up to the senior team for the 2018 FIFA World Cup qualifiers. He made his senior team international debut in a 3–0 lost against Japan, coming on with 10 minutes left on the clock. He earned his third cap in a friendly against Myanmar, coming on for the final 15 minutes of the game.

In 2022, Van Huizen was included in the team for the 2022 FAS Tri-Nations Series and 2022 AFF Championship tournament.

On 12 October 2023, Van Huizen scored his first international goal against Guam in the 2026 FIFA World Cup qualifiers scoring from outside the box with his weak foot.

== Career statistics ==
=== Club ===
As of match played 30 May 2026

Appearances and goals by club, season and competition
Club	Season	League			National Cup (Note: Includes Singapore Cup)		League Cup (Note: Includes Singapore League Cup & Community Shield)		Asia		Total	
Club	Season	Division	Apps	Goals	Apps	Goals	Apps	Goals	Apps	Goals	Apps	Goals
Tampines Rovers	2014	Singapore Premier League	4	1	0	0	4	1	0	0	8	2
Tampines Rovers	Total		4	1	0	0	4	1	0	0	8	2
LionsXII	2015	Malaysia Super League	18	3	0	0	0	0	0	0	18	3
LionsXII	Total		18	3	0	0	0	0	0	0	18	3
Tampines Rovers	2016	Singapore Premier League	10	1	1	0	0	0	0	0	11	1
Tampines Rovers	Total		10	1	1	0	0	0	0	0	11	1
Young Lions	2016	Singapore Premier League	6	0	0	0	0	0	0	0	6	0
Young Lions	Total		6	0	0	0	0	0	0	0	6	0
Home United	2017	Singapore Premier League	9	0	3	0	0	0	5	0	17	0
Home United	2018	Singapore Premier League	12	0	1	0	0	0	5	0	18	0
Home United	Total		21	0	4	0	0	0	10	0	35	0
Geylang International	2019	Singapore Premier League	22	1	1	0	0	0	0	0	23	1
Geylang International	2020	Singapore Premier League	12	2	0	0	0	0	0	0	12	2
Geylang International	2021	Singapore Premier League	19	1	0	0	0	0	0	0	19	1
Geylang International	Total		53	4	1	0	0	0	0	0	54	4
Tampines Rovers	2022	Singapore Premier League	20	3	6	0	0	0	1	0	27	3
Tampines Rovers	Total		20	3	6	0	0	0	1	0	27	3
Lion City Sailors	2023	Singapore Premier League	17	1	6	0	0	0	6	0	29	1
Lion City Sailors	2024–25	Singapore Premier League	30	1	5	0	1	0	15 (Note: 5 in ASEAN Club Championship and 10 in AFC Champions League Two)	0	51	1
Lion City Sailors	2025–26	Singapore Premier League	12	0	3	0	0	0	6 (Note: 4 in ASEAN Club Championship and 2 in AFC Champions League Two)	0	21	0
Lion City Sailors	Total		59	2	14	0	1	0	27	0	101	2
Career total			191	14	26	0	5	1	38	0	260	15

=== International ===
Appearances and goals by national team and year
National team	Year	Apps	Goals
Singapore	2015	2	0
Singapore	2016	2	0
Singapore	2022	8	0
Singapore	2023	7	1
Total		19	1

=== International goals ===
Scores and results list Singapore's goal tally first.

No.	Date	Venue	Opponent	Score	Result	Competition
1.	12 October 2023	National Stadium, Kallang, Singapore	Guam	1–0	2–1	2026 FIFA World Cup qualification

== Honours ==
LionsXII

- Malaysia FA Cup: 2015

Lion City Sailors

- AFC Champions League Two runner-up: 2024–25
- Singapore Premier League: 2024–25
- Singapore Cup: 2023, 2024–25, 2025–26
- Singapore Community Shield: 2024; runner-up: 2025

Individual

- Singapore Premier League Player of the Month: July 2019

== Personal life ==
Aside from playing football, Chris enjoys skating as a side hobby and has participated in different skating competitions around Singapore.
