= LionsXII =

Singaporean youth football club

- Full name: LionsXII
- Nickname: The Lions
- Founded: 5 December 2011 (14 years ago)
- Dissolved: 4 December 2015 (10 years ago)
- Ground: Jalan Besar Stadium
- Capacity: 10,000
- Owner: Football Association of Singapore
- League: Malaysia Super League
- 2015: Malaysia Super League, 7th of 12
Home colours	Away colours	Third colours

LionsXII ("Lions Twelve"), also known as Singapore LionsXII, was a Singaporean youth football club founded in 2011 that played in the Malaysia Super League, the top tier of Malaysian football, from their inaugural season until their dissolution following the 2015 season. Their home ground was the 10,000-capacity Jalan Besar Stadium.

Managed by the Football Association of Singapore, the squad marked the return of Singapore to domestic football in Malaysia since the Singapore FA's representative team (nicknamed the "Lions") was dissolved following the Malaysia Cup in 1994. The name is a combination of Lions and XII, which is a special tribute to the fans, who are generally recognised as football's "12th man". Its motto was "For Country, For Fans. For Passion.”

LionsXII's home kit was in royal red, using the colours of the national flag. Their away kit was in blue, designed to evoke memories of the jersey used in the 1980s and earlier. The club emblem, designed to resemble a lion's paw, showed a fierce and aggressive-looking lion between the white feathery lines.

LionsXII's first silverware was the 2013 Malaysia Super League trophy, in only their second season in the competition; they had finished second in 2012. Their second silverware was the 2015 Malaysia FA Cup when they beat Kelantan FA 3–1 in the final after a stunning display at the Bukit Jalil Stadium.

== History ==
In 2011, the Football Association of Singapore and the Football Association of Malaysia reached an agreement that would see greater co-operation between the two nations. One of the intended avenues would see the under-23s play in the Malaysia Super League and Malaysia Cup from 2012 onwards. Although the new Singapore team would have the existing under-23s forming its core, senior players were also called to guide the younger. No foreign players were allowed to be part of the Singapore team. Former Singapore national football player and former Young Lions FC's coach V. Sundramoorthy became the first coach of the team.

=== 2012 season ===
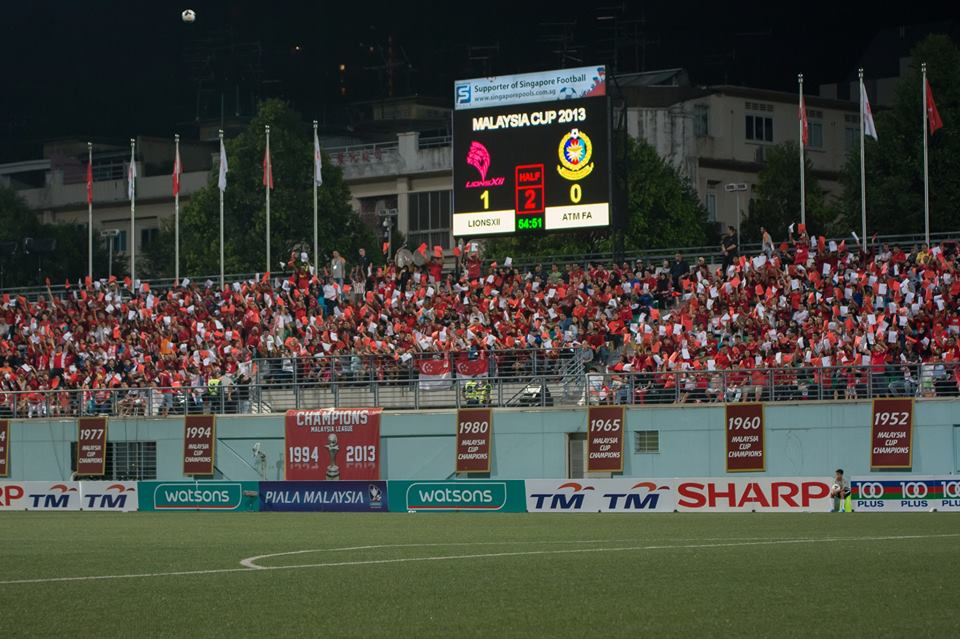
Typical support from LionsXII fans at the Jalan Besar Stadium

LionsXII debuted in the 2012 Malaysia Super League on 10 January with a 1–2 home defeat to defending champions Kelantan FA. The LionsXII's first win was a 2–1 over Kuala Lumpur FA on 17 January. The LionsXII's first away win was a 1–0 over Sabah FA on 21 January. LionsXII began their 2012 Piala FA quest on 18 February with a 3–0 win over UiTM. The LionsXII made their way to the quarter-final with a 2–0 win over Betaria on 10 March. However, they were beaten by Terengganu FA. On 16 June, they defeated Sabah FA 9–0 at home, the biggest win in the MSL season. LionsXII finished second in the league behind Kelantan FA, and bowed out of the semi-final of the 2012 Malaysia Cup after losing in a penalty shoot-out against ATM FA.

On 29 December, assistant coach Kadir Yahaya left his position at LionsXII. Soon, Gombak United chief Tatsuma Yoshida took over his post.

=== 2013 season ===
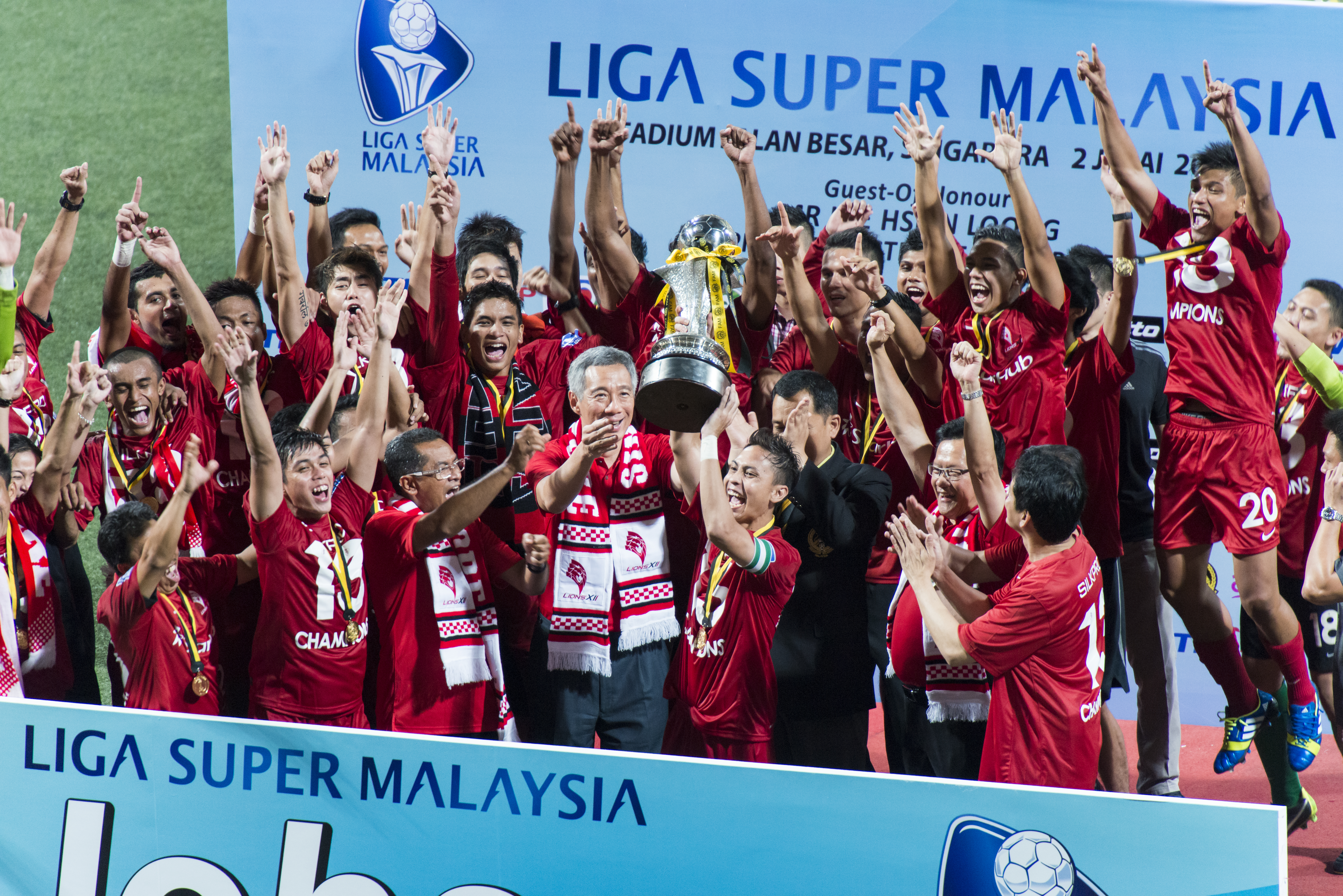
Captain Shahril Ishak receiving the 2013 Liga Super trophy from Singapore Prime Minister Lee Hsien Loong

LionsXII7 set a target of finishing top five for the 2013 Malaysia Super League season. Five overage players were included in this year's squad to guide the younger, namely Shahril Ishak, Isa Halim, Fazrul Nawaz, Irwan Shah and Baihakki Khaizan. Other key players such as Shahdan Sulaiman and Shaiful Esah no longer featured. The main aim was to develop the under-23 players and prepare them for the upcoming 2013 Southeast Asian Games that would be held at the end of the year.

On 21 January 2013, it was announced that Sundramoorthy would be appointed caretaker coach of the Singapore national football team while the Football Association of Singapore searched for a replacement for former coach Radojko Avramović.

LionsXII began their campaign by defeating ATM FA 1–0 away. Subsequently, they vanquished the nation's traditional rivals Selangor FA. However, LionsXII stumbled to three losses against lowly T-Team and PKNS in an away fixture. One sent them crashing out of the 2013 Malaysia FA Cup. In a turn of events, LionsXII went on a long unbeaten streak, securing important wins over Pahang FA (3–0), Kelantan FA (1–0), and ATM FA (3–1) at home.

On 2 July, a 4–0 win over relegation-threatened Felda United in the penultimate league game made LionsXII the 2013 league champions. Prime Minister of Singapore Lee Hsien Loong was present for the match played in front of a sold-out crowd at the Jalan Besar Stadium. The Malaysia Super League trophy was also brought to the stadium as the LionsXII received it on home soil after the final whistle. LionsXII became the first foreign team to win the Malaysia Super League title, adding to the four Malaysian league titles it had won in 1979, 1981, 1985, and 1994. The title run was defined by a combination of good defence (13 goals conceded, the best record in the league) and goals from set-pieces (17 out of 32). The club chalked up their best home record (10 wins and 1 draw) in the league, making Jalan Besar Stadium a fortress.

On 27 July, LionsXII were drawn into Group D for the 2013 Malaysia Cup with Perak FA, Sarawak FA and Kedah FA. They drew Kedah (2–2) in Singapore and succumbed to two collapses against Perak (1–0) and Sarawak (2–1) and near exited the tournament. In August, it was reported that team's coach Sundramoorthy had signed for Malaysia Premier League side Negeri Sembilan FA for two years for double his current deal and will leave LionnsXII at the end of the year.

On 28 September, LionsXII narrowed a 1–0 victory over ATM FA in the first leg of the quarter-finals of the 2013 Malaysia Cup, but squandered to a 1–4 mauling to the opponent in the return tie on 4 October. After the match, FAS announced the departure of Sundramoorthy to Negeri Sembilan FA and the search for a new successor.

=== 2014 season ===
Sufian Anuar and Khairul Amri were recalled to join LionsXII following the exit of Baihakki Khaizan, Hariss Harun and Shahril Ishak to Malaysian side, Johor Darul Ta'zim.

In October 2013, about 20 coaches have applied to be the next LionsXII's coach, including former SAFFC coach Richard Bok, English football player and coachDavid Booth and Kelantan F.C. coach Bojan Hodak. On 7 December, former Johor coach and ex-Singapore international Fandi Ahmad was offered a three-year contract at the helm of the LionsXII, despite initial denials by the Football Association of Singapore. Former Singapore international Nazri Nasir became his assistant. The LionsXII opened their league season with a 1–0 defeat against Pahang FA in the 2014 Piala Sumbangsih on 17 January.

=== 2015 season ===
On 23 May 2015, LionsXII clinched their first Malaysia FA Cup after defeating Kelantan FA 3–1 in the final at Bukit Jalil Stadium. Faris Ramli scored the opening goal after just seven minutes, before Kelantan equalized past the hour mark. However, Sahil Suhaimi scored twice in the final 10 minutes to bring the Cup to Singapore.

On 25 November, the FAM reportedly decided not to extend their Memorandum of Understanding with the FAS, which was signed in 2011. This automatically disqualified LionsXII from further entering official football tournaments in Malaysia. Similarly, Malaysia's squad Harimau Muda A/Harimau Muda B also would not be entering Singapore league from then onwards. It was announced by the FAS that LionsXII were to be disbanded at the end of the 2015 season. However, their salaries would be maintained with the assistance of FAS if they decide to join a domestic club.

== Crest and colours ==
The club crest signified the paw of a lion in appearance, with very much relevance to the nickname Football Association of Singapore has adopted as Singapore is known to be a Lion City. Looking closer at the crest, there is a lion being embedded in it. Using the lines as contrast, the lion shows ferocity and aggressiveness, resembling the fighting spirit and determination of all the players in the squad. It also illustrates the hunger to win games. All the meanings from the crest have also been included in the official LionsXII theme song, called The Roar Anthem. The XI in the word LionsXII is in black to represent the eleven players on the pitch. I is in red to show that the 12th Man to do make a difference in the team's success. Energetic, ready and passion are the crest's main ideas to be conveyed.

=== Kit evolution ===
The kit launched in 2011 had the primary colours of white, red and blue. Playing at home, the players were stripped in the white/red/red kit while in blue/blue/blue kit when playing away in Malaysia. Many T-shirt designs were based on white and red, which are the colours of the Lion City. Also, white symbolised purity and humbleness of the LionsXII. However, during the semi-final Piala Malaysia game between ATM FA and LionsXII in Stadium Majlis Perbandaran Selayang in which they were defeated on penalties and bowed out of the tournament, they wore a combination of the white top and blue bottom. Many fans were feeling displeasure as it looked hideous.

A revamp for the jerseys were called for as many players were dropped in 2013 while young players from S.League club Courts Young Lions were brought in.

== Stadium ==
Since the team was formed, the LionsXII have been playing all their home matches at the expandable 10,000 capacity Jalan Besar Stadium. The stadium was known as the Lions' Den and an "impregnable fortress" where the LionsXII were undefeated in the entire 2013 season.

== Supporters ==
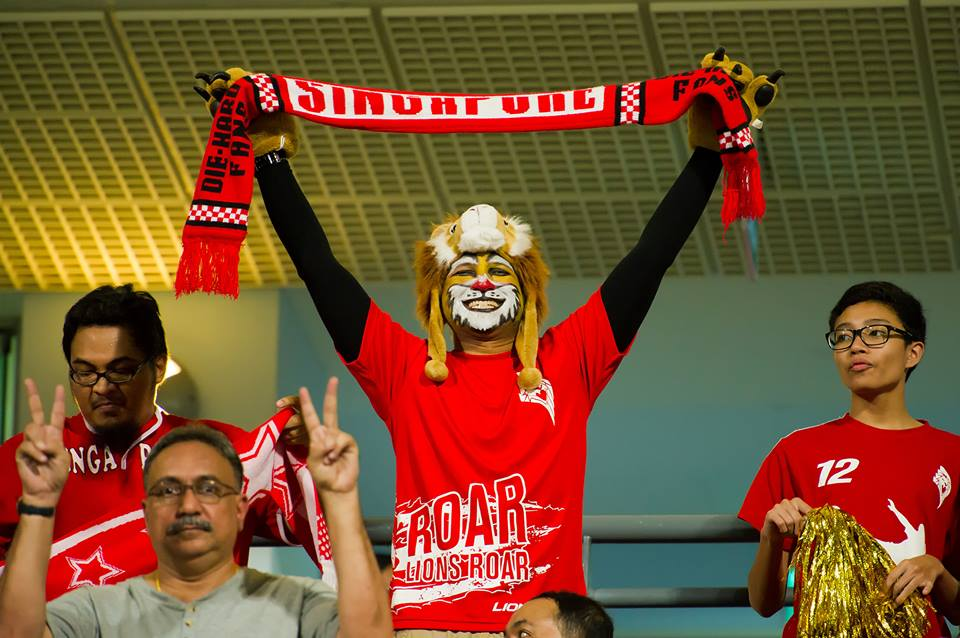
A LionsXII fan showing his support for the team by having his face painted like a lion

LionsXII regularly attracted over an average of 6,200 fans to Jalan Besar Stadium. The stadium was minimally half-filled across all matches in all the seasons LionsXII have participated in.

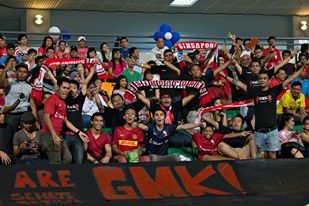
LionsXII unofficial fan group based at the Grandstand, named Grandstand Maki Kaki providing their usual support to the team during every home match

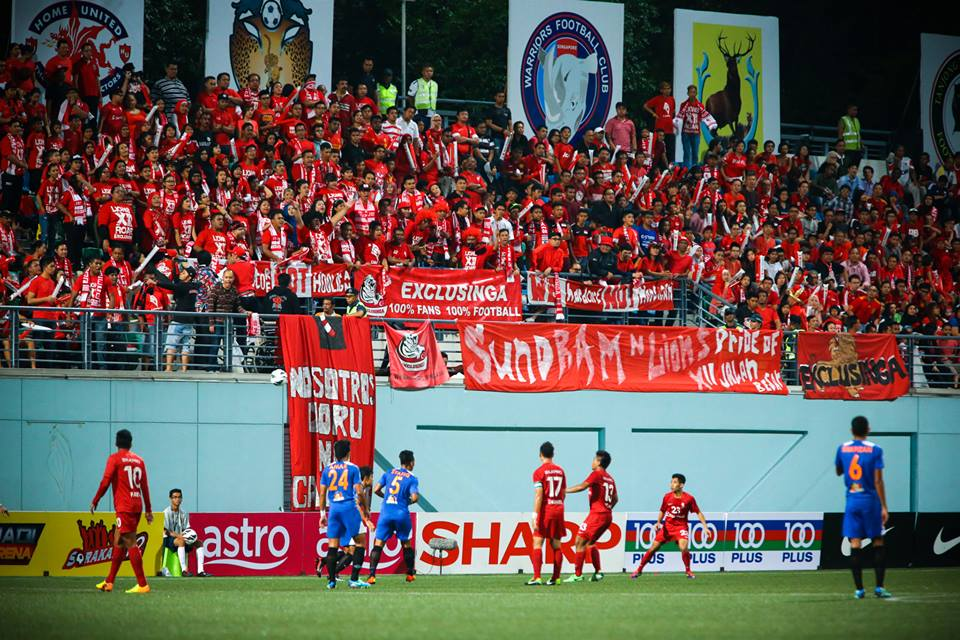
LionsXII fans from the Gallery stand as they watch their team play against PKNS

=== Rivalries ===
LionsXII held a strong rivalry with Malaysian club Angkatan Tentara Malaysia FA (the Armed Forces team), with the two clubs meeting recently in a cup game in the 2013 Malaysia Cup. In 2012, ATM ended the dream of the club of going into the final of the 2012 Malaysia Cup in a dramatic game. In 2013, LionsXII took revenge by defeating them 1–0 in the 2013 Malaysia Super League opener. However, ATM once again shattered the double wish as they overturned the deficit sustained in the first leg of the 2013 Malaysia Cup quarter-finals and emerged triumphant 4–2 over the LionsXII.

Along the way, long standing issues with the Malaysia Super League participants PKNS of Selangor and T-Team of Terengganu also arose. Despite either team being far from title contenders, LionsXII are still unable to break the voodoo of winning these two teams in away fixtures. In 2012, PKNS and PBDKT T-Team both edged LionsXII with a solitary goal, 1–0 and 2–1 respectively. In spite of beating them 5–0 and 2–1 accordingly at home, they continued the spell in 2013. LionsXII were booted out of the 2013 Malaysia FA Cup in the first round's encounter with PKNS. LionsXII also suffered losses against PKNS (1–0) and T-Team (1–0) at other times, the latter questioned controversy.

Their predecessor as Singaporean Malaysia Super League club, Singapore FA, had a very intense rivalry with Selangor FA.

== Partners and sponsors ==
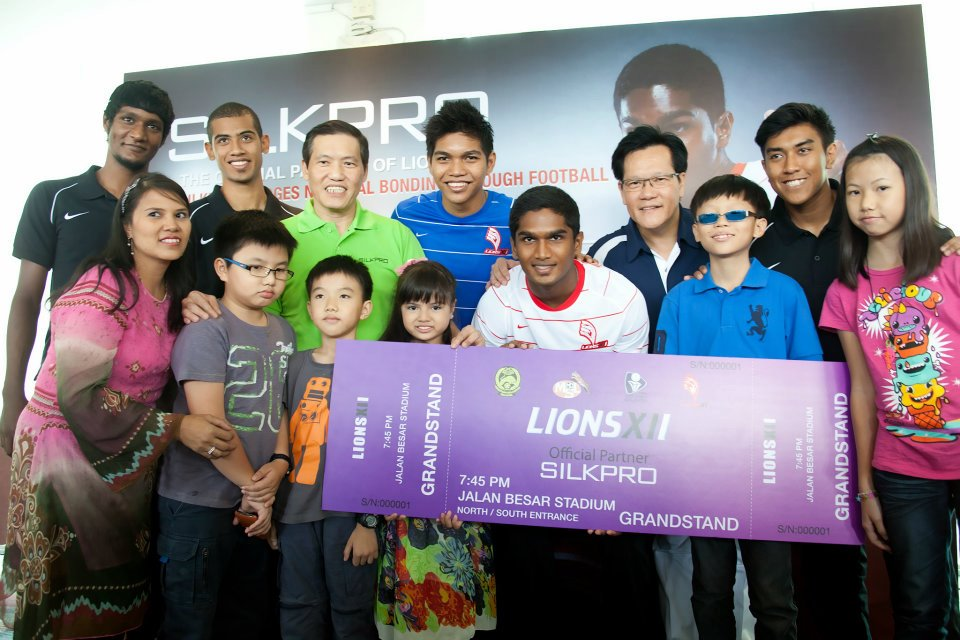
StarHub and Football Association of Singapore sign partnership to be the official broadcaster and shirt sponsor of LionsXII.

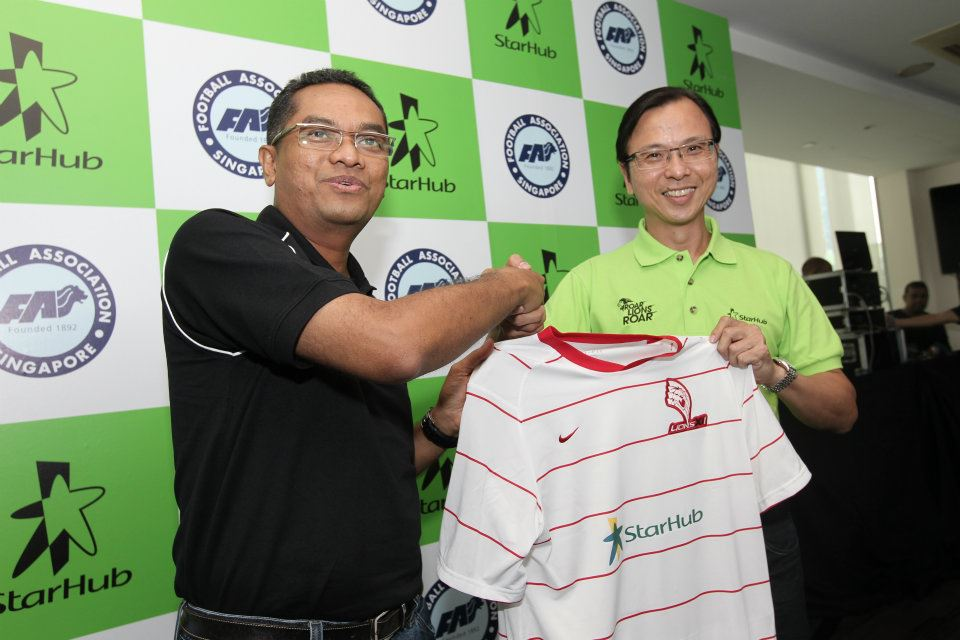
Partnership with SilkPro with a projected S$1 million sponsor amount signed at the beginning of the 2012 season at Jalan Besar Stadium VIP room

At the start of 2012, Kingsmen was announced to be the official marketing and sponsorship representative of the LionsXII. Yolk also began its website partnership with LionsXII as they realised that the voices of the nation were also in need of modernisation. Along the way, LionsXII's success has attracted many sponsors. Partners on social media included Temasek Polytechnic, The Cage, X-League and Tiger Beer Football.

== Kit manufacturers and shirt sponsors ==
Period	Kit manufacturer	Shirt sponsor
2012–15	Nike	StarHub

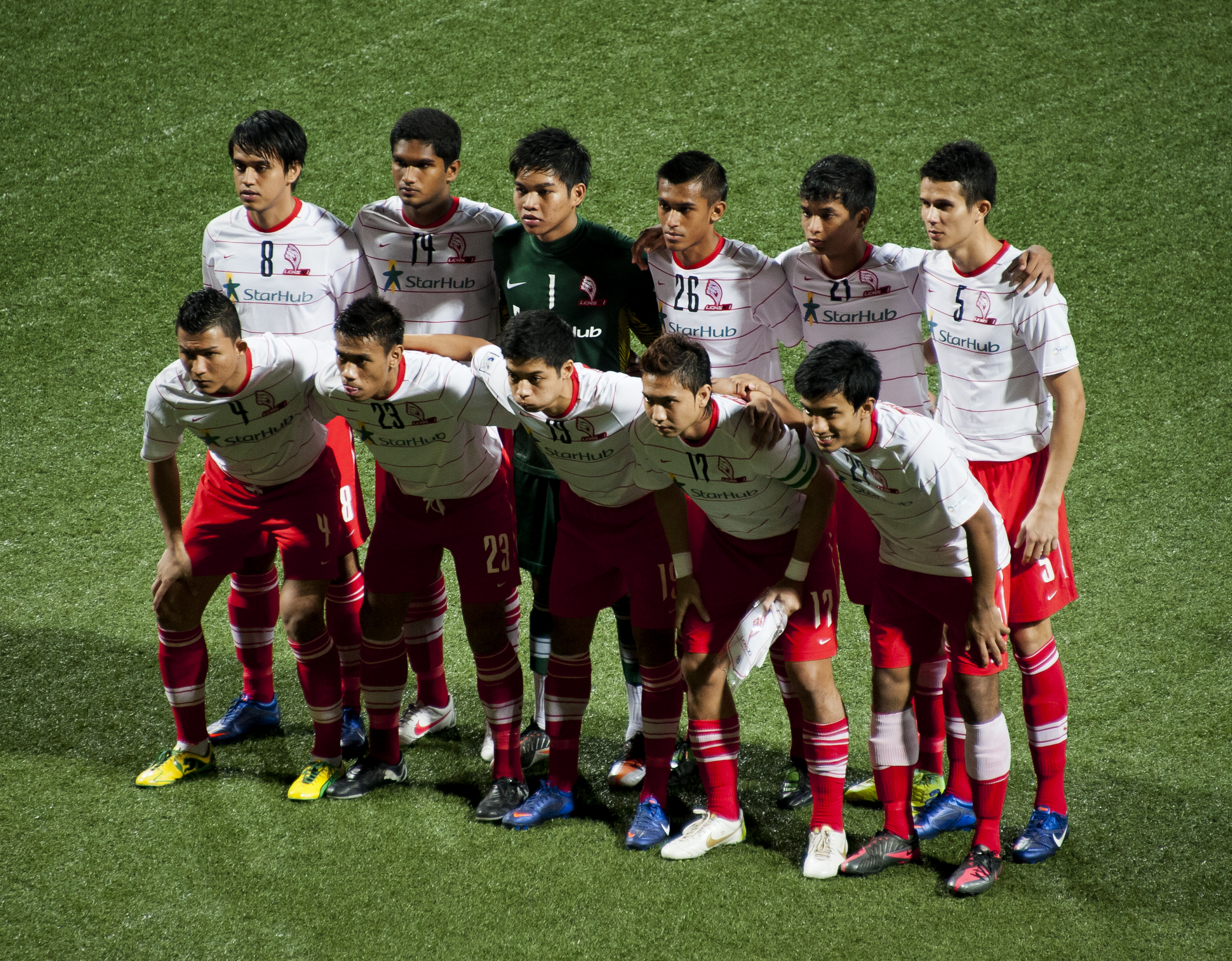
The starting eleven for the home game against Kuala Lumpur FA on 17 January 2012

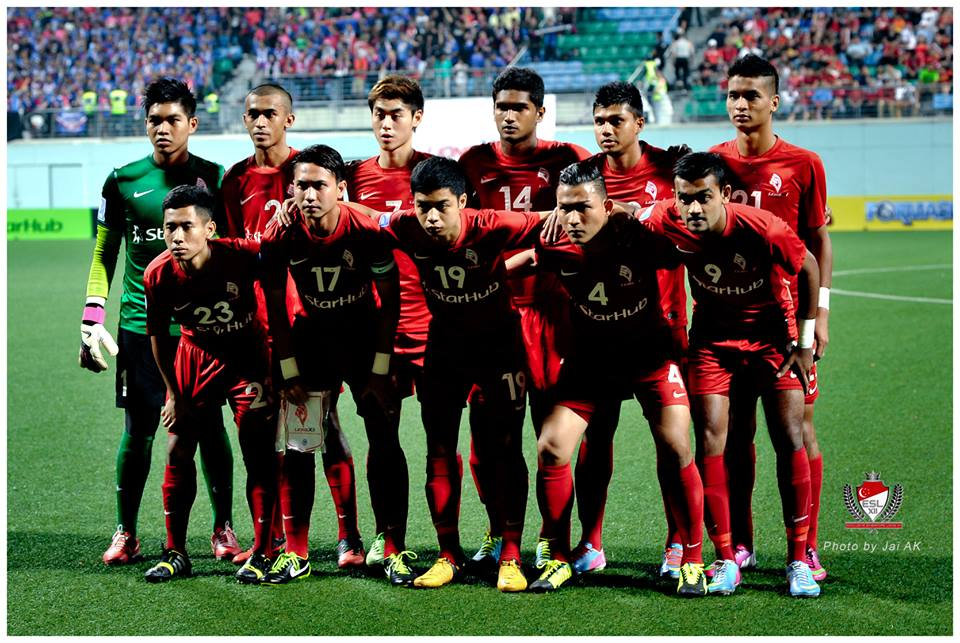
The starting eleven for the home game against Johor Darul Ta'zim on 22 June 2013

== Captains ==
Year	Player
2012–2013	Shahril Ishak
2014	Isa Halim
2015	Izwan Mahbud

== Management ==
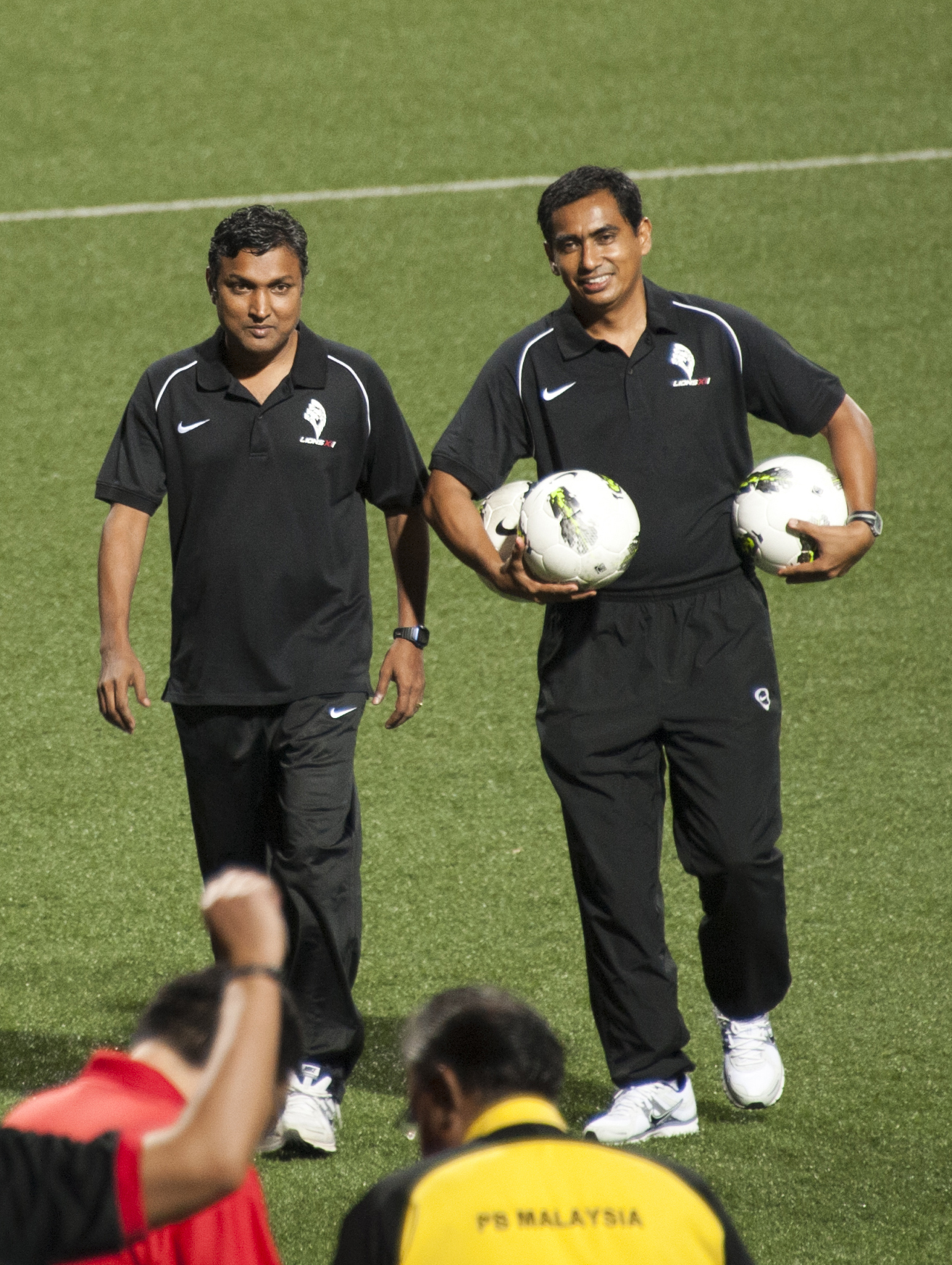
Former Lions head coach V. Sundramoorthy and his assistant Kadir Yahaya. Kadir resigned at the end of 2012.

=== Last coaching staff ===
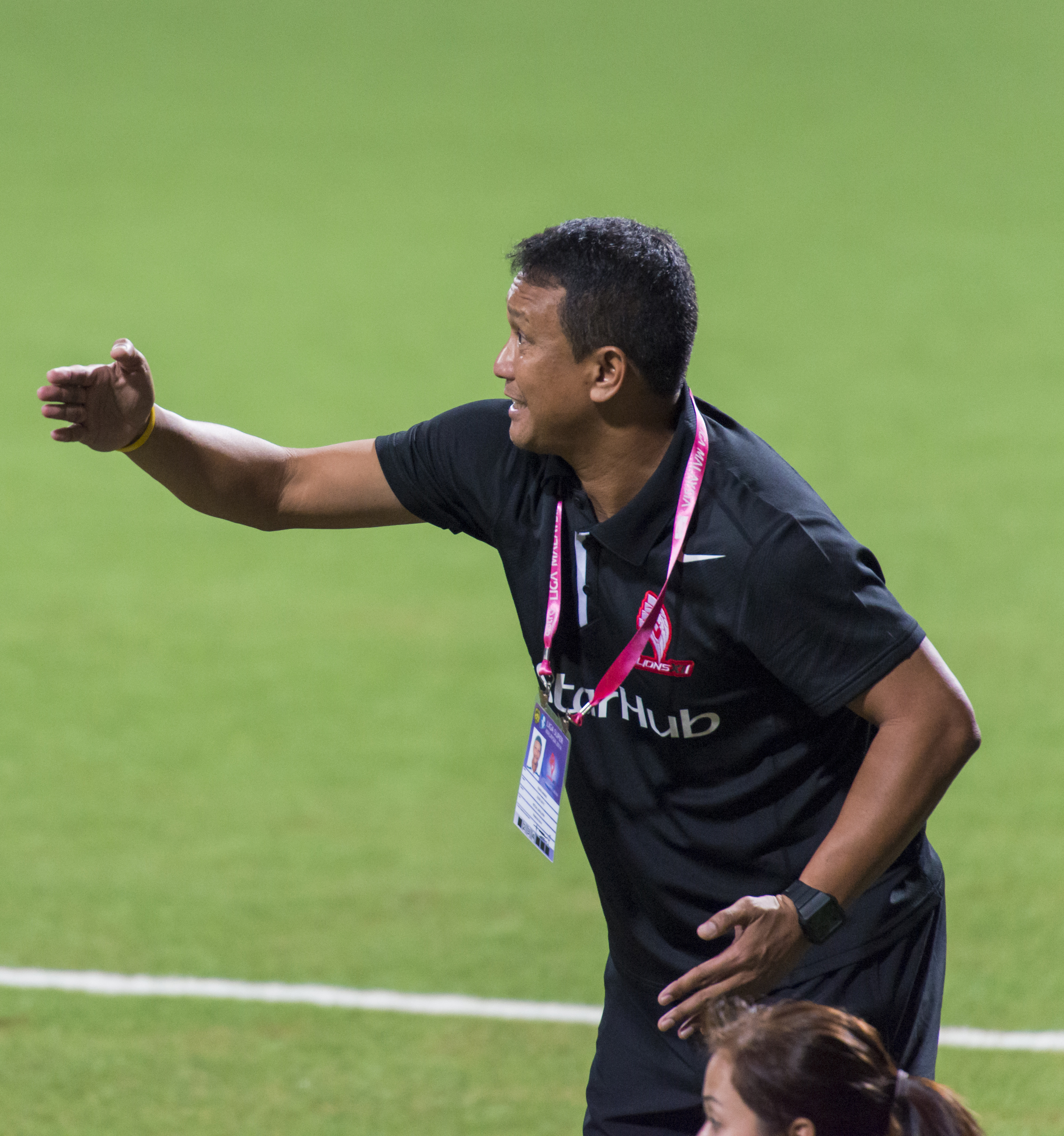
Fandi Ahmad took over as head coach for the 2014 season.

Position	Name
Manager	(Singapore) Visakan Subramanian
Head team coach	(Singapore) Fandi Ahmad
Assistant coach	(Singapore) Nazri Nasir
Goalkeeping coach	(England) John Burridge
Fitness coach	(Serbia) Aleksandar Boženko
Fitness coach	(Singapore) Gurnaya Singh
Physiotherapist	(Singapore) Nurhafizah Abu Sujad
Kitman	(Singapore) Omar Mohamed

== Head coaches ==
V. Sundramoorthy and Fandi Ahmad were both part of the Singapore Lions 'Dream Team' that won promotion back to the M-league Division 1 and finished as runners-up to Kedah in the Piala Malaysia Final in 1993.

The following year, led by Fandi, Singapore overcame the absence of Sundram to win the 1994 M-League and Piala Malaysia double.

Name	From	To	P	W	D	L	Win%	Honours
(Singapore) V. Sundramoorthy	January 2012	7 October 2013	49	27	12	10	55.1	1 Malaysia Super League
(Singapore) Fandi Ahmad	7 December 2013	25 November 2015	32	11	8	13	34.38	1 Malaysia FA Cup

- Information correct as of 9 July 2015. Only League results.

== Competition records ==
Season	Liga Super								Piala FA	Piala Malaysia
Season	Pos	P	W	D	L	F	A	Pts	Piala FA	Piala Malaysia
2012	2nd	26	15	5	6	48	23	50	Quarter-finals	Semi-finals
2013	1st	22	12	7	3	32	15	43	1st round	Quarter-finals
2014	8th	22	8	4	10	26	27	28	2nd round	Group stage
2015	7th	22	9	6	7	36	32	33	Winner	Quarter-finals

Last updated on 23 May 2015

== Club records ==
Wins

- Record win: 9–0 (v Sabah, Malaysia Super League, 16 June 2012)

Defeats

- Record defeat: 4–0 (v Selangor, Malaysia Super League, 18 April 2015)

Goals

- Most league goals scored in a season: 53 in 26 matches, 2012 Malaysia Super League
- Fewest league goals scored in a season: 26 in 22 matches, 2014 Malaysia Super League
- Most league goals conceded in a season: 27 in 22 matches, 2014 Malaysia Super League
- Fewest league goals conceded in a season: 18 in 26 matches, 2012 Malaysia Super League

== Player records ==
=== Goalscorers ===
- Most goals in a season: 14, Shahril Ishak, (2012)
- Most league goals in a season: 10, Shahril Ishak, (2012)
- Most goals in a single match: 3, Hariss Harun (v Sabah, 2012 Malaysia Super League, 16 June 2012), Sufian Anuar (v Pahang, 2014 Malaysia Super League, 15 April 2014)

=== Former LionsXII players in Malaysian clubs ===
Name	Club	Period
Hariss Harun	Johor Darul Ta'zim	2014–2021
Shahril Ishak	Johor Darul Ta'zim II	2014-2016
Baihakki Khaizan	Johor Darul Ta'zim; Johor Darul Ta'zim II	2014 2015–2016
Fazrul Nawaz	Sabah	2015
Safuwan Baharudin	PDRM; Sri Pahang; Selangor; Negeri Sembilan	2016-2017 2018–2019 2020–2022, 2023–present 2023
Sahil Suhaimi	Sarawak	2017
Yasir Hanapi	PDRM	2017
Hafiz Abu Sujad	Johor Darul Ta'zim II	2018
Madhu Mohana	Negeri Sembilan	2018
Shahdan Sulaiman	Melaka United	2018
Faris Ramli	PKNS; Perlis United; Terengganu; Perak	2018 2019 2020 2024
Khairul Amri	Felda United	2019-2020
Shakir Hamzah	Kedah Darul Aman; Perak	2019-2020 2021

== Honours ==
=== League ===
- Malaysia Super League
  - Champions (1): 2013
  - Runners-up (1): 2012

=== Cup ===
- Malaysia FA Cup
  - Champions (1): 2015
- Piala Sumbangsih
  - Runners-up (1): 2014

=== Awards ===
- FAM Football Awards
  - Fair Play award: 2015

== See also ==
- Singapore FA
- Young Lions FC
- Singa Muda Perlis F.C.
- FAM-MSN Project
- National Football Development Programme of Malaysia

Achievements
Preceded by Kelantan FA	Liga Super Champions; 2013	Succeeded by Johor Darul Ta'zim
