= 2015 in Malaysian football =

Football in Malaysia
- Season: 2015

Men's football
- Super League: Johor DT
- Premier League: Kedah
- FAM League: Malacca United
- FA Cup: LionsXII
- Malaysia Cup: Selangor
- Community Shield: Johor DT

The 2015 season will be the 36th season of competitive association football in Malaysia.

== Promotion and relegation ==
=== Pre-season ===
League	Promoted to league	Relegated from league
Super League	PDRM; FELDA United	T-Team; PKNS
Premier League	Kuantan; Kuala Lumpur	Perlis; PBAPP

== New and withdrawn teams ==
=== New teams ===
- Megah Murni F.C. (FAM League)
- AirAsia F.C. (FAM League)
- Johor Darul Ta'zim III F.C. (FAM League)
- Penjara F.C. (FAM League)
- UKM F.C. (FAM League)
- Real Mulia F.C. (FAM League)
- Felcra F.C. (FAM League)
- Young Fighters F.C. (FAM League)

=== Withdrawn teams ===
- Cebagoo F.C. (FAM League)
- Perak YBU F.C. (FAM League)

== National team ==
=== Malaysia national football team ===
==== 2018 FIFA World Cup qualification – AFC second round ====
Pos	Team	Pld	W	D	L	GF	GA	GD	Pts	Qualification	Saudi Arabia	United Arab Emirates	Palestine	Malaysia	East Timor
1	Saudi Arabia	8	6	2	0	28	4	+24	20	World Cup qualifying third round and Asian Cup	—	2–1	3–2	2–0	7–0 (Note: On 12 December 2017, AFC decided to forfeit the first five matches involving Timor-Leste – both v Malaysia, home v United Arab Emirates, away v Saudi Arbia, and home v Palestine due to the use of falsified documents for their players of Timor-Leste.)
2	United Arab Emirates (Note: United Arab Emirates already qualified for the Asian Cup as the host nation.)	8	5	2	1	25	4	+21	17	World Cup qualifying third round	1–1	—	2–0	10–0	8–0
3	Palestine	8	3	3	2	22	6	+16	12	Asian Cup qualifying third round	0–0	0–0	—	6–0	7–0
4	Malaysia	8	1	1	6	4	29	−25	4	Asian Cup qualifying play-off round	0–3 (Note: Match abandoned after 87 minutes due to a group of supporters throwing flares at the pitch. A month later, FIFA awarded Saudi Arabia 3–0 win.)	1–2	0–6	—	1–1
5	Timor-Leste	8	0	2	6	2	36	−34	2	Asian Cup qualifying play-off round	0–10	0–1	1–1	0–1	—

Rules for classification: Qualification tiebreakers
Notes:

11 June 2018 World Cup QC – 2nd round	Malaysia	1–1	Timor-Leste	Kuala Lumpur
20:45 UTC+8	Safee 34'	Report (FIFA); Report (AFC)	Saro 90+3'	Stadium: Bukit Jalil National Stadium; Attendance: 5,000; Referee: Jarred Gillett (Australia)

16 June 2018 World Cup QC – 2nd round	Malaysia	0–6	Palestine	Kuala Lumpur
20:45 UTC+8		Report (FIFA); Report (AFC)	Al-Batat 9'; Maraaba 23', 75'; Seyam 41', 85'; Yousef 63'	Stadium: Bukit Jalil National Stadium; Referee: Kim Sang-woo (South Korea)

3 September 2015 2018 World Cup QC – 2nd round	United Arab Emirates	10–0	Malaysia	Abu Dhabi
19:15 UTC+4	Salem 16'; Mabkhout 22', 33', 76'; Khalil 24', 29', 70', 78'; Fardan 25'; Ahmed 37'	Report (FIFA); Report (AFC)		Stadium: Mohammed Bin Zayed Stadium; Attendance: 7,822; Referee: Abdulrahman Al-Jassim (Qatar)

8 September 2015 2018 World Cup QC – 2nd round	Malaysia	0–3; Awarded (Note: The match between Malaysia and Saudi Arabia was abandoned during the 87th minute after a group of supporters threw objects onto the pitch. At the time of the abandonment the score was 2–1 to Saudi Arabia. On 5 October 2015, FIFA decided that the match should be declared as lost by forfeit by Malaysia (0–3). Malaysia must also play their next home match against the United Arab Emirates without spectators.)	Saudi Arabia	Shah Alam
20:45 UTC+8	Safiq 70'	Report (FIFA); Report (AFC)	Al-Jassim 73'; Al-Sahlawi 76'	Stadium: Shah Alam Stadium; Attendance: 10,000; Referee: Liu Kwok Man (Hong Kong)

13 October 2015 2018 World Cup QC – 2nd round	Timor-Leste	0–1	Malaysia	Dili
16:00 UTC+9		Report (FIFA); Report (AFC)	Amri 10'	Stadium: Dili Municipal Stadium; Attendance: 2,500; Referee: Kim Hee-Gon (South Korea)

12 November 2015 2018 World Cup QC – 2nd round	Palestine	6–0	Malaysia	Amman, Jordan
16:00 UTC+2	Zorrilla 37'; Abu Nahyeh 38', 45', 58'; Seyam 88'; Ihbeisheh 90+1'	Report (FIFA); Report (AFC)		Stadium: Amman International Stadium; Attendance: 9,772; Referee: Ahmed Al-Kaf (Oman)

17 November 2018 World Cup QC – 2nd round	Malaysia	1–2	United Arab Emirates	Shah Alam, Malaysia
20:45 UTC+8	Baddrol 59'	Report (FIFA); Report (AFC)	O. Abdulrahman 22'; Khalil 52'	Stadium: Shah Alam Stadium; Attendance: 0 Referee: Masaaki Toma (Japan)

==== International Friendlies ====
26 March Friendly	Oman	6–0	Malaysia	Seeb, Oman
	Al-Qasmi 15', 67'; Al-Muqbali 42' (pen.), 51'; Qasim Said 47'; Al-Khaldi 89' (pen.)	Report		Stadium: Al-Seeb Stadium

6 June Friendly	Hong Kong	0–0	Malaysia	Shah Alam, Malaysia
20:45 UTC+8				Stadium: Shah Alam Stadium

29 August Friendly	Malaysia	0–0	Bangladesh	Shah Alam, Malaysia
				Stadium: Shah Alam Stadium

08 October Friendly	Laos	1–3	Malaysia	Bangkok, Thailand
	Khanthavong 82'		Christie 50', 90'; Azamuddin 53'	Stadium: Thai Army Sports Stadium

=== League XI ===
27 May Friendly^{XI}	Malaysia XI	1–2	(England) Tottenham Hotspur	Shah Alam, Selangor, Malaysia
20:45 UTC+8				Stadium: Shah Alam Stadium

24 July Friendly^{XI}	Malaysia XI	1-1	(England) Liverpool	Kuala Lumpur, Malaysia
20:45 UTC+8				Stadium: Bukit Jalil National Stadium

=== Malaysia national under-23 football team ===
==== 2015 Bangabandhu Cup ====
Team	Pld	W	D	L	GF	GA	GD	Pts
Malaysia U-22	2	2	0	0	3	0	+3	6
Bangladesh	2	1	0	1	1	1	0	3
Sri Lanka	2	0	0	2	0	3	-3	0

29 January Group stage	Malaysia	1 – 0	Bangladesh	Sylhet District Stadium, Sylhet, Bangladesh
17:00 UTC+6	Syazwan 51'			Attendance: 20,000

29 January Group stage	Malaysia	2 – 0	Sri Lanka	Sylhet District Stadium, Sylhet, Bangladesh
17:00 UTC+6	Syahrul 45+4'; Ridzuan 60'			Attendance: 7,000

5 February Semi Final	Malaysia	1 – 0	Singapore	Sylhet District Stadium, Sylhet, Bangladesh
17:00 UTC+6	Kumaahran 50'

8 February Final	Malaysia	3 – 2	Bangladesh	Bangabandhu National Stadium, Dhaka, Bangladesh
17:00 UTC+6	Naim 31'; Kumaahran 40'; Faizat Ghazli 90+1'		Ameli 49'; Yeasin Khan 55'

==== 2016 AFC U-23 Championship qualification ====
Pos	Team	Pld	W	D	L	GF	GA	GD	Pts	Qualification
1	Japan	3	3	0	0	10	0	+10	9	Final tournament
2	Vietnam	3	2	0	1	9	3	+6	6	Final tournament
3	Malaysia (H)	3	1	0	2	3	3	0	3	
4	Macau	3	0	0	3	0	16	−16	0	

Source: AFC
Rules for classification: Qualification Tiebreakers
(H) Hosts

27 March Group stage	Malaysia	1 – 2	Vietnam	Shah Alam Stadium, Shah Alam, Malaysia
20:45 (UTC+8)	Naim 34'	Report	V. H. Tuan 38'; N .C. Phuong 44'	Attendance: 2,145; Referee: Chris Beath (Australia)

29 March Group stage	Macau	0 – 2	Malaysia	Shah Alam Stadium, Shah Alam, Malaysia
16:30 (UTC+8)		Report	Syahrul 12'; Amirzafran 67'	Attendance: 780; Referee: Rowan Arumughan (India)

31 March Group stage	Japan	1 – 0	Malaysia	Shah Alam Stadium, Shah Alam, Malaysia
20:45 (UTC+8)	Kubo 41'	Report		Attendance: 1,766; Referee: Chris Beath (Australia)

==== 2015 Southeast Asian Games ====
Pos	Team	Pld	W	D	L	GF	GA	GD	Pts	Qualification
1	Thailand	5	5	0	0	16	1	+15	15	Semi-finals
2	Vietnam	5	4	0	1	17	4	+13	12	Semi-finals
3	Malaysia	5	3	0	2	7	7	0	9	
4	Laos	5	2	0	3	6	13	−7	6	
5	Timor-Leste	5	1	0	4	4	10	−6	3	
6	Brunei	5	0	0	5	2	17	−15	0	

Source: Seagames 2015
Rules for classification: 1) Points; 2) Goal difference; 3) Goals scored

30 May Group stage	Malaysia	1–0	Timor-Leste	Bishan Stadium, Bishan, Singapore
20:30 (UTC+8)	Saarvindran 12'	Report

2 June Group stage	Vietnam	5 – 1	Malaysia	Bishan Stadium, Bishan, Singapore
20:30 (UTC+8)

4 June Group stage	Malaysia	0 – 1	Thailand	Bishan Stadium, Bishan, Singapore
16:00 (UTC+8)

8 June Group stage	Brunei	0 – 2	Malaysia	Bishan Stadium, Bishan, Singapore
20:30 (UTC+8)

11 June Group stage	Laos	1 – 3	Malaysia	Bishan Stadium, Bishan, Singapore
20:30 (UTC+8)

==== Friendly ====
17 February Friendly	Indonesia	1 – 0	Malaysia	Gelora Delta Stadium, Sidoarjo, Indonesia
16:00 (UTC+7)	Sitanggang 36'	Report

23 February Friendly	Malaysia	0 – 1	Fiji	UiTM Stadium, Shah Alam, Malaysia
20:30 (UTC+8)			Antonio Tuivuna 47'

26 February Friendly	Malaysia	2 – 1	Pakistan	UiTM Stadium, Shah Alam, Malaysia
20:30 (UTC+8)	Naim 8'; Kumaahran 73'		Muhammad Riaz 90+2'

19 March Friendly	Myanmar	3 – 0	Malaysia	Thuwunna Stadium, Yangon, Myanmar
14:30 (UTC+6:30)	Than Paing 13'; Kyaw Min Oo 43'; Aung Thu 49'

22 March Friendly	Myanmar	1 – 1	Malaysia	Thuwunna Stadium, Yangon, Myanmar
14:30 (UTC+6:30)			Shafiq 26'	Referee: Khin Mg Win

22 March Friendly	Malaysia	1 – 1	North Korea	Thai-Japanese Stadium, Bangkok, Thailand
17:00 (UTC+7)	M. Kogileswaran 79'		Jong Il-gwan 34' (pen.)

26 March Friendly	Air Force United (Thailand)	2 – 0	Malaysia	Thupatemee Stadium, Bangkok, Thailand
17:00 (UTC+7)

30 March Friendly	Police United (Thailand)	3 – 0	Malaysia	Thammasat Stadium, Bangkok, Thailand
16:30 (UTC+7)

== League season ==
=== Super league ===
Pos	Team	Pld	W	D	L	GF	GA	GD	Pts	Qualification or relegation
1	Johor Darul Ta'zim (C)	22	14	4	4	36	18	+18	46	Qualification to AFC Champions League qualifying preliminary round 2
2	Selangor	22	11	6	5	43	28	+15	39	Qualification to AFC Cup group stage (Note: Since LionsXII, a side managed by the Football Association of Singapore and thus ineligible to represent Malaysia in continental competition, won the 2015 Piala FA, the 2015 Liga Super runners-up will be chosen to represent Malaysia in the AFC Cup.)
3	Pahang	22	13	5	4	43	29	+14	38 (Note: Pahang was docked 6 points due to involvement in the delay in the process of solving the problem of salary and compensation by the former imports season 2013, Mohamed Borji.)	
4	Terengganu	22	12	2	8	40	33	+7	38	
5	Felda United	22	10	6	6	36	26	+10	36	
6	PDRM	22	11	2	9	42	39	+3	35	
7	LionsXII (Note: LionsXII are not eligible for any AFC competition spots)	22	9	6	7	36	32	+4	33	End of MoU's and dissolved end of season.
8	Perak	22	8	4	10	32	33	−1	28	
9	Kelantan	22	8	4	10	34	38	−4	28	
10	Sarawak	22	4	7	11	28	40	−12	19	
11	ATM (R)	22	2	5	15	21	47	−26	11	Qualification to the Relegation play-off
12	Sime Darby (R)	22	1	7	14	20	48	−28	10	Relegation to Liga Premier

Source: FAM Official Site, Astro Arena
Rules for classification: 1) points; 2) goal difference; 3) number of goals scored
(C) Champions; (R) Relegated

=== Premier league ===
Pos	Team	Pld	W	D	L	GF	GA	GD	Pts	Promotion, qualification or relegation
1	Kedah (C, P)	22	14	6	2	47	26	+21	48	Promotion to Super League
2	Penang (P)	22	13	6	3	39	18	+21	45	Promotion to Super League
3	(Terengganu) T-Team (O, P)	22	12	6	4	50	27	+23	42	Qualification to Promotion play-off
4	(Selangor) PKNS	22	11	8	3	41	22	+19	41	
5	Johor Darul Ta'zim II	22	10	4	8	37	32	+5	34	
6	(Negeri Sembilan) NS Matrix	22	8	8	6	33	28	+5	32	
7	Sabah	22	8	3	11	37	42	−5	27	
8	(Malaysia) UiTM	22	7	4	11	28	42	−14	25	
9	(Pahang) Kuantan	22	6	3	13	30	46	−16	21	
10	(Malaysia) DRB-Hicom	22	4	8	10	25	32	−7	20	
11	Kuala Lumpur	22	5	3	14	17	33	−16	18	
12	(Kuala Lumpur) Putrajaya SPA (R)	22	2	5	15	15	50	−35	11	Relegation to FAM League

Source: FAM Official Site, Astro Arena
Rules for classification: 1) Points; 2) Goal difference; 3) Number of goals scored
(C) Champions; (O) Play-off winners; (P) Promoted; (R) Relegated

=== FAM league ===
==== Group A ====
Pos	Team	Pld	W	D	L	GF	GA	GD	Pts	Promotion
1	Perlis (P)	18	12	6	0	33	10	+23	42	Promotion to Premier League and final round
2	Real Mulia	18	9	5	4	19	14	+5	32	Withdrew from FAM League and dissolved.
3	Megah Murni	18	7	6	5	18	15	+3	27	
4	UKM	18	6	7	5	26	20	+6	25	
5	PBAPP	18	7	4	7	22	20	+2	25	Withdrew from FAM League and dissolved.
6	Sungai Ara	18	6	6	6	16	17	−1	24	
7	Felcra	18	5	6	7	20	24	−4	21	
8	Shahzan Muda	18	5	5	8	22	25	−3	20	
9	Penjara	18	5	1	12	25	40	−15	16	
10	Hanelang	18	3	4	11	18	34	−16	13	

Source: FAM Official Site
Rules for classification: 1) Points; 2) Goal difference; 3) Number of goals scored
(P) Promoted

==== Group B ====
Pos	Team	Pld	W	D	L	GF	GA	GD	Pts	Promotion
1	Melaka United (C, P)	16	11	3	2	30	13	+17	36	Promotion to Premier League and final round
2	MISC-MIFA	16	11	3	2	33	17	+16	36	
3	Young Fighters	16	9	4	3	28	17	+11	31	Withdrew from FAM League and dissolved.
4	MOF	16	6	3	7	29	27	+2	21	
5	Kedah United	16	6	2	8	16	29	−13	20	Withdrew from FAM League and dissolved.
6	Harimau Muda C	16	5	4	7	26	28	−2	19	Withdrew from FAM League and dissolved.
7	AirAsia	16	4	4	8	15	21	−6	16	
8	Ipoh F.A.	16	4	1	11	16	27	−11	13	
9	Johor Darul Ta'zim III	16	2	4	10	10	24	−14	10	Relocated to President's Cup

Source: FAM Official Site
Rules for classification: 1) Points; 2) Goal difference; 3) Number of goals scored
(C) Champions; (P) Promoted

== Domestic Cups ==
=== Community Shield ===
31 Jan 2015 Charity Shield	Johor Darul Ta'zim FC	2 – 0	Pahang FA	Johor Bahru, Johor
20:45 UTC+08:00	Marcos Antonio 36'; Luciano Figueroa 58'	Report		Stadium: Tan Sri Dato Hj Hassan Yunos Stadium; Attendance: 21,618; Referee: Mohd Amirul Izwan Yaakob (Selangor)

=== FA Cup ===
1st Round
Pahang	1(4)
(Johor) JDT	1(2)
(Penang) Sungai Ara	0
(Kuala Lumpur) MISC-MIFA	1
(Negeri Sembilan) NS Matrix	2
(Selangor) UiTM	0
Penang	1
Perlis	0
(Penang) PBAPP	1
(Selangor) Sime Darby	5
(Malaysia) PDRM	3
Sabah	0
Sarawak	1
Kelantan	2
(Putrajaya) MOF	1
Kuala Lumpur	3
(Kuala Lumpur) FELDA United	2(2)
Selangor	2(4)
Malacca United	1
Terengganu	3
(Pahang) Shahzan Muda	1
Perak	3
(Terengganu) T-Team	3
ATM	0
Kedah United	0
(Singapore) LionsXII	4
(Putrajaya) SPA	3
(Pahang) Kuantan	0
(Terengganu) Hanelang	0
Kedah	1
(Johor) JDT II	2
(Selangor) PKNS	1

2nd Round
Pahang	2
(Kuala Lumpur) MISC-MIFA	1
(Negeri Sembilan) NS Matrix	1
Penang	2
(Selangor) Sime Darby	4
(Malaysia) PDRM	2
Kelantan	1
Kuala Lumpur	0
Selangor	1
Terengganu	3
Perak	2
(Terengganu) T-Team	1
(Singapore) LionsXII	4
(Putrajaya) SPA	0
Kedah	0
(Johor) JDT II	1

Quarter-finals
Pahang	2	2	4
Penang	0	2	2
(Selangor) Sime Darby	1	0	1
Kelantan	1	3	4
Terengganu	1	2	3
Perak	1	0	1
(Singapore) LionsXII	2	2	4
(Johor) JDT II	0	0	0

Semi-finals
Pahang	1	1	2
Kelantan	0	3	3
Terengganu	1	3	4
(Singapore) LionsXII	2	2	4 (a)

Final
Kelantan	1
(Singapore) LionsXII	3

==== Final ====
23 May 2015
20:45 UTC+08:00

Kelantan	1 – 3	(Singapore) LionsXII
Wan Zack Haikal 62'		Faris Ramli 7'; Sahil Suhaimi 81', 90 +2'

Bukit Jalil National Stadium, Kuala Lumpur

=== Malaysia Cup ===
==== Final ====
12 December 2015
21:00 UTC+08:00

Selangor	2 – 0	Kedah
Hazwan 4', 48'

Shah Alam Stadium, Shah Alam
Referee: Muhd Nazmi Nasaruddin

== Malaysian clubs in Asia ==
=== Johor Darul Ta'zim F.C. ===
==== AFC Champions League ====
===== Qualifying play-off =====
4 February 2015 Preliminary round 1	Johor Darul Ta'zim (Malaysia)	2–1 (a.e.t.)	(India) Bengaluru FC	Larkin Stadium, Johor Bahru
20:45 UTC+8	Hariss 47'; Chanturu 97'	Report	Lyngdoh 90'	Attendance: 17,455; Referee: Yudai Yamamoto (Japan)

10 February 2015 Preliminary round 2	Bangkok Glass (Thailand)	3–0	(Malaysia) Johor Darul Ta'zim	Leo Stadium, Pathum Thani
19:00 UTC+7	Narong 28'; Kaimbi 52', 62'	Report		Attendance: 5,299; Referee: Chris Beath (Australia)

==== AFC Cup ====
===== Group stage =====
Pos	Team	Pld	W	D	L	GF	GA	GD	Pts	Qualification	JDT	KIT	EBG	BAL
1	(Malaysia) Johor Darul Ta'zim	6	5	0	1	11	3	+8	15	Advance to knockout stage	—	2–0	4–1	3–0
2	(Hong Kong) Kitchee	6	3	2	1	10	6	+4	11	Advance to knockout stage	2–0	—	2–2	3–0
3	(India) East Bengal	6	1	2	3	8	10	−2	5		0–1	1–1	—	3–0
4	(Singapore) Balestier Khalsa	6	1	0	5	3	13	−10	3		0–1	1–2	2–1	—

Source: AFC
Rules for classification: Group stage tiebreakers

24 February 2015 Group stage	Johor Darul Ta'zim (Malaysia)	4–1	(India) East Bengal	Larkin Stadium, Johor Bahru
20:45 UTC+8	Nazrin 9'; Safiq 38' (pen.); Chanturu 47'; Safee 53'	Report	Martins 35'	Attendance: 12,212; Referee: Sivakorn Pu-Udom (Thailand)

10 March 2015 Group stage	Balestier Khalsa (Singapore)	0–1	(Malaysia) Johor Darul Ta'zim	Jalan Besar Stadium, Singapore
19:30 UTC+8		Report	Asraruddin 90+3'	Attendance: 2,180; Referee: Abdulrahman Al-Jassim (Qatar)

17 March 2015 Group stage	Kitchee (Hong Kong)	2–0	(Malaysia) Johor Darul Ta'zim	Mong Kok Stadium, Hong Kong
20:00 UTC+8	Belencoso 27'; Tarrés 35'	Report		Attendance: 2,277; Referee: Võ Minh Trí (Vietnam)

14 April 2015 Group stage	Johor Darul Ta'zim (Malaysia)	2–0	(Hong Kong) Kitchee	Larkin Stadium, Johor Bahru
20:45 UTC+8	Figueroa 17'; Safiq 44' (pen.)	Report		Attendance: 10,154; Referee: Wang Di (China)

28 April 2015 Group stage	East Bengal (India)	2–0	(Malaysia) Johor Darul Ta'zim	Salt Lake Stadium, Kolkata
18:00 UTC+5:30		Report	Gaikwad 6' (o.g.)	Attendance: 100; Referee: Nivon Robesh Gamini (Sri Lanka)

12 May 2015 Group stage	Johor Darul Ta'zim (Malaysia)	3–0	(Singapore) Balestier Khalsa	Larkin Stadium, Johor Bahru
20:45 UTC+8	Safee 76'; Safiq 85'; Figueroa 90'	Report		Attendance: 10,110; Referee: Hiroyuki Kimura (Japan)

===== Knock-out stage =====
27 May 2015 Round of 16	Johor Darul Ta'zim (Malaysia)	5 – 0	(Myanmar) Ayeyawady United	Larkin Stadium, Johor Bahru
20:45 UTC+8	Safiq 1'; Figueroa 46', 90+1'; Díaz 61', 74'	Report		Attendance: 16,850; Referee: Jameel Abdulhusin (Bahrain)

26 August 2015 Quarter-finals (1st leg)	Johor Darul Ta'zim (Malaysia)	1 – 1	(Hong Kong) South China	Larkin Stadium, Johor Bahru
20:45 UTC+8	Figueroa 49' (pen.)	Report	Mahama 63'	Attendance: 14,700; Referee: Ahmed Al-Kaf (Oman)

15 September 2015 Quarter-finals (2nd leg)	South China (Hong Kong)	1 – 3	(Malaysia) Johor Darul Ta'zim	Mong Kok Stadium, Hong Kong
20:00 UTC+8	Mahama 28'	Report	Mahali 26'; Safee 30', 45+2'	Attendance: 6,412; Referee: Fahad Al-Marri (Qatar)

29 September 2015 Semi-finals (1st leg)	Al-Qadsia (Kuwait)	3 – 1	(Malaysia) Johor Darul Ta'zim	Al Kuwait Sports Club Stadium, Kuwait City
19:20 UTC+3	Fuakumputu 33'; Al-Mutawa 42' (pen.); Soumah 58'	Report	Amri 82'	Attendance: 1,501; Referee: Ko Hyung-jin (South Korea)

20 October 2015 Semi-finals (2nd leg)	Johor Darul Ta'zim (Malaysia)	Cancelled	(Kuwait) Al-Qadsia	Larkin Stadium, Johor Bahru
20:45 UTC+8		Report

As a result, both Al-Qadsia and Al-Kuwait were no longer eligible to compete in the AFC Cup. The second legs of both semi-finals were cancelled, and Johor Darul Ta'zim and Istiklol advanced to the final by walkover.

31 October 2015 Final	Istiklol (Tajikistan)	0 – 1	(Malaysia) Johor Darul Ta'zim	Pamir Stadium, Dushanbe
17:00 UTC+5		Report	Leandro 23'	Attendance: 18,000; Referee: Minoru Tōjō

=== Pahang FA ===
==== AFC Cup ====
===== Group stage =====
Pos	Team	Pld	W	D	L	GF	GA	GD	Pts	Qualification	SCA	PAH	GLO	YAD
1	(Hong Kong) South China	6	6	0	0	19	3	+16	18	Advance to knockout stage	—	3–1	3–0	3–1
2	(Malaysia) Pahang	6	2	2	2	11	10	+1	8	Advance to knockout stage	0–1	—	0–0	7–4
3	(Philippines) Global	6	1	2	3	5	12	−7	5		1–6	0–0	—	4–1
4	(Myanmar) Yadanarbon	6	1	0	5	10	20	−10	3		0–3	2–3	2–0	—

Source: AFC
Rules for classification: Group stage tiebreakers

25 February 2015 Group stage	Yadanarbon (Myanmar)	2–3	(Malaysia) Pahang	Mandalarthiri Stadium, Mandalay
16:00 UTC+6:30	Stewart 35' (o.g.); Djawa 55' (pen.)	Report	Nwakaeme 6', 12'; Gopi 89'	Attendance: 10,115; Referee: Rowan Arumughan (India)

11 March 2015 Group stage	Pahang (Malaysia)	0–0	(Philippines) Global	Darul Makmur Stadium, Kuantan
20:45 UTC+8		Report		Attendance: 7,000; Referee: Kim Hee-gon (South Korea)

18 March 2015 Group stage	Pahang (Malaysia)	0–1	(Hong Kong) South China	Darul Makmur Stadium, Kuantan
20:45 UTC+8		Report	Chan Siu Ki 13'	Attendance: 5,400; Referee: Fu Ming (China)

15 April 2015 Group stage	South China (Hong Kong)	3–1	(Malaysia) Pahang	Mong Kok Stadium, Hong Kong
20:00 UTC+8	Chan Siu Kwan 10'; Lo Kong Wai 53'; Sealy 56'	Report	Nwakaeme 62'	Attendance: 2,820; Referee: Sukhbir Singh (Singapore)

29 April 2015 Group stage	Pahang (Malaysia)	7–4	(Myanmar) Yadanarbon	Darul Makmur Stadium, Kuantan
20:45 UTC+8	Nwakaeme 7', 32', 59'; Conti 18'; Saarvindaran 48', 87'; Hafiz 85'	Report	Djawa 45+1'; Hlaing Bo Bo 58', 68'; Win Naing Soe 90+1'	Attendance: 2,758; Referee: Yu Ming-hsun (Chinese Taipei)

13 May 2015 Group stage	Global (Philippines)	0–0	(Malaysia) Pahang	Philippine Sports Stadium, Bocaue
19:00 UTC+8		Report		Attendance: 2,000; Referee: Tan Hai (China)

===== Knock-out stage =====
26 May 2015 Round of 16	Persipura Jayapura (Indonesia)	Cancelled; 0–3 (Awarded)	(Malaysia) Pahang	Mandala Stadium, Jayapura
15:30 UTC+9		Report		Referee: Adham Makhadmeh (Jordan)

The Persipura Jayapura v Pahang match was not played as scheduled as Pahang players were denied entry into Indonesia due to visa issues. The AFC announced on 10 June 2015 that as a result, Persipura Jayapura forfeited the match and was considered to have lost the match by 3–0, based on the AFC Cup 2015 Competition Regulations and the AFC Disciplinary Code.

26 August 2015 Quarter-finals (1st leg)	Istiklol (Tajikistan)	4 – 0	(Malaysia) Pahang	Pamir Stadium, Dushanbe
20:00 UTC+5	Chahjouyi 35'; Vasiev 36', 77'; Makhmudov 51'	Report		Attendance: 15,000; Referee: Adham Makhadmeh (Jordan)

16 September 2015 Quarter-finals (2nd leg)	Pahang (Malaysia)	3 – 1	(Tajikistan) Istiklol	Darul Makmur Stadium, Kuantan
20:45 UTC+8	Hafiz 31', 58'; Saarvindran 90+2'	Report	Makhmudov 61'	Attendance: 1,309; Referee: Abdullah Al Hilali (Oman)

== Coaching changes ==
Team	Outgoing Head Coach	Manner of departure	Date of vacancy	Incoming Head Coach	Date of appointment
Perak	(Croatia) Vjeran Simunic	Contract terminated	1 January 2015	(Malaysia) M. Karathu	1 January 2015
Kelantan	(Ghana) (Netherlands) George Boateng	Sacked	24 March 2015	(Malaysia) Mohd Azraai Khor Abdullah	24 March 2015
ATM	(Malaysia) B. Sathianathan	Sacked	14 April 2015	(Malaysia) Shahrin Abdul Majid	14 April 2015
Johor DT	(Croatia) Bojan Hodak	End of contract	14 April 2015	(Argentina) Roberto Carlos Mario Gómez	1 May 2015
