= 2015 AFC Cup final =

- Event: 2015 AFC Cup
Istiklol	Johor Darul Ta'zim
(Tajikistan)	(Malaysia)
0	1
- Date: 31 October 2015
- Venue: Pamir Stadium, Dushanbe
- Man of the Match: (Malaysia) Safiq Rahim
- Referee: Minoru Tōjō (Japan)
- Attendance: 18,000

The 2015 AFC Cup final was the final match of the 2015 AFC Cup, the 12th edition of the AFC Cup, a football competition organized by the Asian Football Confederation (AFC) for clubs from 'developing countries' in Asia according to the Vision Asia plan.

The final was contested as a single match between Tajikistani team Istiklol and the Malaysian team Johor Darul Ta'zim. The match was hosted by Istiklol at the Pamir Stadium in Dushanbe on 31 October 2015. Leandro Velázquez scored the only goal in a match for Johor Darul Ta'zim, who won the match 1–0 and clinched their first title.

== Venue ==
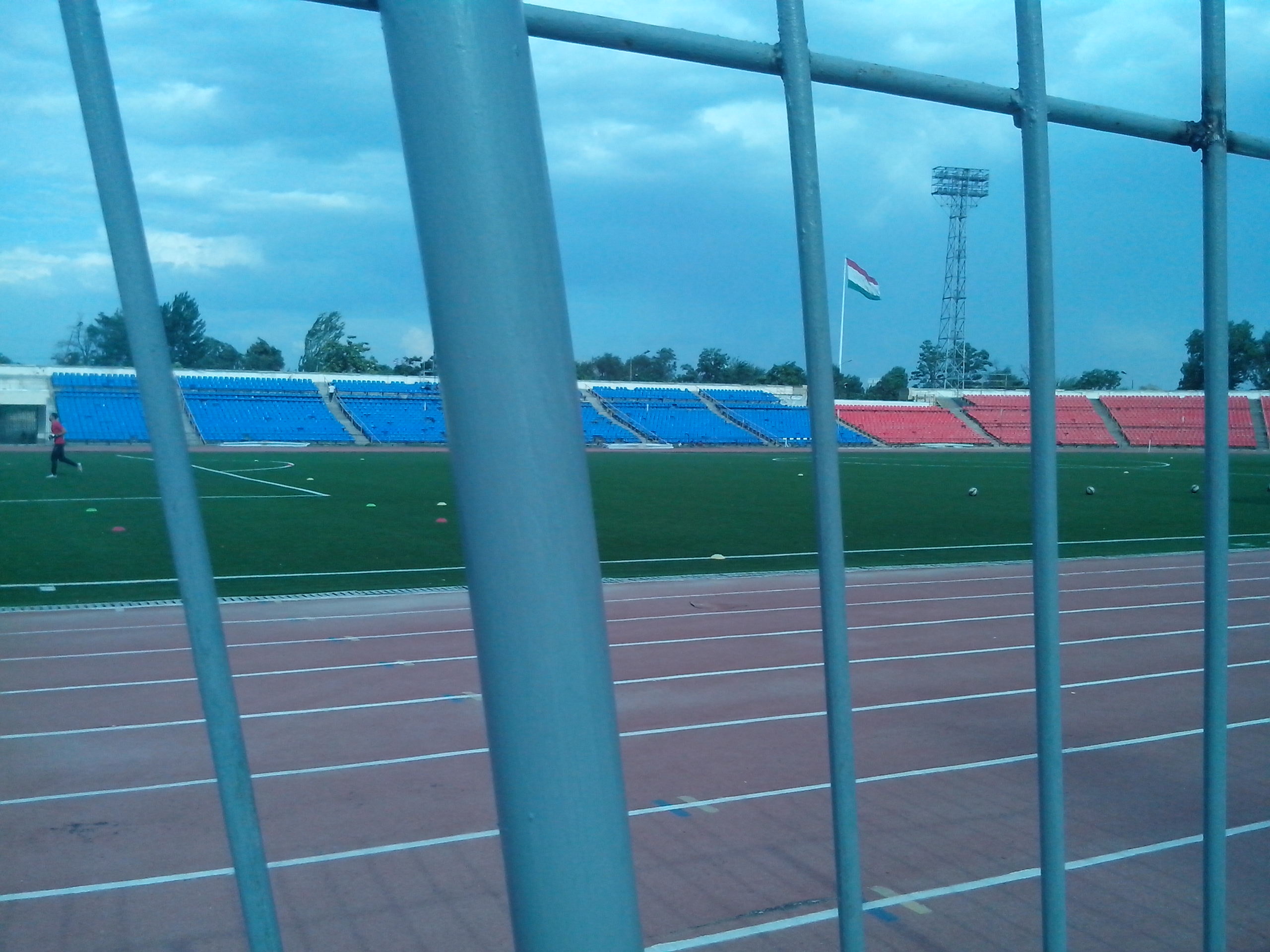
Pamir Stadium

The Pamir Stadium is a multi-use stadium in Dushanbe, Tajikistan. It is the home stadium of Istiklol and holds 24,000 spectators.

== Background ==
Istiklol qualified for the 2015 AFC Cup group stage as the 2014 Tajik League and 2014 Tajik Cup winners. This was their first appearance in the AFC Cup.

Johor Darul Ta'zim qualified for the 2015 AFC Champions League qualifying play-off as the 2014 Malaysia Super League champions, but failed to advance to the AFC Champions League group stage, and entered the AFC Cup group stage. This was their second appearance in the AFC Cup.

Both teams reached the AFC Cup final for the first time, and Johor Darul Ta'zim was the first team from East Asia Zone to reach the final.

== Road to final ==
Note: In all results below, the score of the finalist is given first (H: home; A: away).

(Tajikistan) Istiklol				Round	(Malaysia) Johor Darul Ta'zim			
AFC Cup				Qualifying play-off	AFC Champions League			
Opponent	Result			Qualifying play-off	Opponent	Result		
Bye				Round 1	(India) Bengaluru FC	2–1 (a.e.t.) (H)		
Bye				Round 2	(Thailand) Bangkok Glass	0–3 (A)		
AFC Cup
Opponent	Result			Group stage	Opponent	Result		
(Iraq) Erbil	1–3 (H)			Matchday 1	(India) East Bengal	4–1 (H)		
(Turkmenistan) Ahal	2–1 (A)			Matchday 2	(Singapore) Balestier Khalsa	1–0 (A)		
(Kuwait) Al-Qadsia	2–2 (A)			Matchday 3	(Hong Kong) Kitchee	0–2 (A)		
(Kuwait) Al-Qadsia	2–0 (H)			Matchday 4	(Hong Kong) Kitchee	2–0 (H)		
(Iraq) Erbil	0–0 (A)			Matchday 5	(India) East Bengal	1–0 (A)		
(Turkmenistan) Ahal	5–2 (H)			Matchday 6	(Singapore) Balestier Khalsa	3–0 (H)		
Group C winner: Pos / Team / Pld / Pts; 1 / (Tajikistan) Istiklol / 6 / 11; 2 / (Kuwait) Al-Qadsia / 6 / 10; 3 / (Iraq) Erbil / 6 / 7; 4 / (Turkmenistan) Ahal / 6 / 6; Source: AFC				Final standings	Group F winner: Pos / Team / Pld / Pts; 1 / (Malaysia) Johor Darul Ta'zim / 6 / 15; 2 / (Hong Kong) Kitchee / 6 / 11; 3 / (India) East Bengal / 6 / 5; 4 / (Singapore) Balestier Khalsa / 6 / 3; Source: AFC			
Opponent	Agg.	1st leg	2nd leg	Knockout stage	Opponent	Agg.	1st leg	2nd leg
(Syria) Al-Wahda	1–1 (a.e.t.) (4–2 p) (H) (single match)			Round of 16	(Myanmar) Ayeyawady United	5–0 (H) (single match)		
(Malaysia) Pahang	5–3	4–0 (H)	1–3 (A)	Quarter-finals	(Hong Kong) South China	4–2	1–1 (H)	3–1 (A)
Al-Kuwait	w/o	0–4 (A)	Cancelled (H)	Semi-finals	(Kuwait) Al-Qadsia	w/o	1–3 (A)	Cancelled (H)

== Rules ==
The final was played as a single match, with the host team decided by draw. If tied after regulation, extra time and, if necessary, penalty shoot-out would be used to decide the winner.

== Match ==
31 October 2015
17:00 UTC+5

Istiklol (Tajikistan)	0–1	(Malaysia) Johor Darul Ta'zim
	Report	Velázquez 23'

Pamir Stadium, Dushanbe
Attendance: 18,000
Referee: Minoru Tōjō (Japan)

Istiklol	Johor Darul Ta'zim

GK	1	(Serbia) Nikola Stošić
DF	2	(Tajikistan) Siyovush Asrori	(yellow card) 77'
DF	11	(Tajikistan) Jakhongir Jalilov
DF	15	(Ukraine) Petro Kovalchuk
DF	22	(Iran) Mahdi Chahjouei
MF	8	(Tajikistan) Nuriddin Davronov
MF	9	(Tajikistan) Khurshed Makhmudov		(substituted off) 73'
MF	18	(Tajikistan) Fatkhullo Fatkhuloev
MF	63	(Tajikistan) Manuchekhr Dzhalilov
FW	10	(Spain) Manuel Rodríguez		(substituted off) 86'
FW	17	(Tajikistan) Dilshod Vasiev (c)
Substitute
GK	16	(Tajikistan) Alisher Tuychiev
GK	35	(Tajikistan) Kurban Boboev
DF	19	(Tajikistan) Akhtam Nazarov		(substituted on) 86'
MF	7	(Tajikistan) Umedzhon Sharipov
MF	21	(Tajikistan) Romish Jalilov
MF	39	(Tajikistan) Parvizdzhon Umarbayev		(substituted on) 73'
Coach
(Tajikistan) Mubin Ergashev

GK	1	(Malaysia) Farizal Marlias	(yellow card) 54'
DF	6	(Brazil) Marcos António
DF	7	(Malaysia) Aidil Zafuan
DF	12	(Malaysia) S. Kunanlan
DF	42	(Malaysia) Fazly Mazlan
MF	8	(Malaysia) Safiq Rahim (c)
MF	14	(Singapore) Hariss Harun
MF	21	(Malaysia) Jasazrin Jamaluddin
FW	9	(Argentina) Leandro Velázquez	(yellow card) 51'	(substituted off) 86'
FW	10	(Malaysia) Safee Sali	(yellow card) 53'	(substituted off) 60'
FW	19	(Argentina) Luciano Figueroa
Substitute
GK	24	(Malaysia) Izham Tarmizi
DF	18	(Malaysia) Mahali Jasuli		(substituted on) 60'
DF	26	(Malaysia) Amer Saidin
MF	13	(Malaysia) Gary Steven Robbat	(yellow card) 90+5'	(substituted on) 86'
MF	16	(Malaysia) Shakir Shaari
MF	23	(Malaysia) S. Chanturu
FW	17	(Malaysia) Amri Yahyah
Coach
(Argentina) Mario Gomez

AFC Man of the Match:
(Malaysia) Safiq Rahim (Johor Darul Ta'zim)

Assistant referees:
Toshiyuki Nagi (Japan)
Ochi Shinji (Japan)
Fourth official:
Jumpei Iida (Japan)
