= 2015 AFC Cup qualifying play-off =

The 2015 AFC Cup qualifying play-off was played from 9 to 17 February 2015. A total of 14 teams competed in the qualifying play-off to decide five of the 32 places in the group stage of the 2015 AFC Cup.

== Format ==
The bracket for the qualifying play-off, which consisted of two rounds (preliminary round and play-off round), was determined by the AFC based on the association ranking of each team. Each tie was played as a single match, with the team from the higher-ranked association hosting the match. Extra time and penalty shoot-out were used to decide the winner if necessary. The winners of each tie in the play-off round advanced to the group stage to join the 27 automatic qualifiers.

== Teams ==
The following 13 teams (11 from West Zone, 2 from East Zone) were entered into the qualifying play-off:

Zone	Teams entering in play-off round	Teams entering in preliminary round
West Zone	(Oman) Fanja; (Bahrain) Al-Hidd; (Lebanon) Salam Zgharta; (Syria) Al-Jaish; (Palestine) Hilal Al-Quds	~~(Palestine) Hilal Al-Quds~~; (Tajikistan) Khayr Vahdat; (Turkmenistan) Altyn Asyr; (Turkmenistan) Ahal; (Kyrgyzstan) Dordoi; (Yemen) Al-Saqr; (Bangladesh) Sheikh Russel
East Zone	(Maldives) Maziya; (Philippines) Ceres	

== Schedule ==
The schedule of the competition was as follows.

Round	Match date
Preliminary round	9–10 February 2015
Play-off round	17 February 2015

== Bracket ==
=== Play-off West 1 ===
Ahal advanced to Group C.

Preliminary round		Play-off round
		(Oman) Fanja	2
(Turkmenistan) Ahal	1	(Turkmenistan) Ahal	3
(Kyrgyzstan) Dordoi	0

=== Play-off West 2 ===
Al-Hidd advanced to Group B.

Preliminary round		Play-off round
		(Bahrain) Al-Hidd	2
(Turkmenistan) Altyn Asyr	0	(Yemen) Al-Saqr	1
(Yemen) Al-Saqr	1

=== Play-off West 3 ===
Salam Zgharta advanced to Group A.

Preliminary round		Play-off round
		(Lebanon) Salam Zgharta	3
(Tajikistan) Khayr Vahdat	1	(Tajikistan) Khayr Vahdat	0
(Bangladesh) Sheikh Russel	0

=== Play-off West 4 ===
Al-Jaish advanced to Group D.

Preliminary round		Play-off round
		(Syria) Al-Jaish (pen.)	0(5)
(Palestine) Hilal Al-Quds (w/o)	—	(Palestine) Hilal Al-Quds	0(4)
(Nepal) Manang Marshyangdi Club	—

=== Play-off East ===
Maziya advanced to Group E.

Preliminary round	Play-off round
	(Maldives) Maziya	1
	(Philippines) Ceres	0

== Preliminary round ==
Team 1	Score	Team 2
West Zone
Ahal (Turkmenistan)	1–0	(Kyrgyzstan) Dordoi
Altyn Asyr (Turkmenistan)	0–1	(Yemen) Al-Saqr
Khayr Vahdat (Tajikistan)	1–0	(Bangladesh) Sheikh Russel
Hilal Al-Quds (Palestine)	w/o	(Nepal) Manang Marshyangdi Club

9 February 2015
17:00 UTC+5

Ahal (Turkmenistan)	1–0	(Kyrgyzstan) Dordoi
Annadurdyýew 8'	Report

Ashgabat Stadium, Ashgabat
Attendance: 15,000
Referee: Ilgiz Tantashev (Uzbekistan)

10 February 2015
13:00 UTC+5

Khayr Vahdat (Tajikistan)	1–0	(Bangladesh) Sheikh Russel
Rustamov 22'	Report

Pamir Stadium, Dushanbe
Attendance: 10,000
Referee: Abdulrahman Al-Jassim (Qatar)

10 February 2015
18:00 UTC+5

Altyn Asyr (Turkmenistan)	0–1	(Yemen) Al-Saqr
	Report	Ali 67'

Ashgabat Stadium, Ashgabat
Attendance: 18,000
Referee: Wang Di (China)

10 February 2015

Hilal Al-Quds (Palestine)	Cancelled	(Nepal) Manang Marshyangdi Club

Manang Marshyangdi Club withdrew.

== Play-off round ==
Team 1	Score	Team 2
West Zone
Fanja (Oman)	2–3	(Turkmenistan) Ahal
Al-Hidd (Bahrain)	2–1	(Yemen) Al-Saqr
Salam Zgharta (Lebanon)	3–0	(Tajikistan) Khayr Vahdat
Al-Jaish (Syria)	0–0 (a.e.t.) (5–4 p)	(Palestine) Hilal Al-Quds
East Zone
Maziya (Maldives)	1–0	(Philippines) Ceres

17 February 2015
16:00 UTC+5

Maziya (Maldives)	1–0	(Philippines) Ceres
Samdhooh 82'	Report

National Football Stadium, Malé
Attendance: 1,522
Referee: Tan Hai (China)

17 February 2015
13:45 UTC+2

Salam Zgharta (Lebanon)	3–0	(Tajikistan) Khayr Vahdat
Khatib 23'; Galán 48'; Boutros 87'	Report

Zgharta Stadium, Zgharta
Attendance: 1,271
Referee: Nagor Amir Noor Mohamed (Malaysia)

17 February 2015
19:00 UTC+4

Fanja (Oman)	2–3	(Turkmenistan) Ahal
Ndione 67'; Danguir 83'	Report	Annadurdyýew 7'; Annaýew 41'; Şermetow 75'

Al-Seeb Stadium, Seeb
Attendance: 1,000
Referee: Ma Ning (China)

17 February 2015
18:00 UTC+3

Al-Jaish (Syria)	0–0 (a.e.t.)	(Palestine) Hilal Al-Quds
	Report
Penalties
Al-Awad (penalty scored); Sharifa (penalty scored); Al-Kaddour (penalty scored); Salkeni (penalty scored); Dommarani (penalty scored) (Note: Order of Al-Jaish penalties not known)	5–4	(penalty scored) Saba'a; (penalty missed) Ismail; (penalty scored) Salem; (penalty scored) Saleh; (penalty scored) Hwaiti

Al Ahli Stadium, Manama (Bahrain)
Attendance: 200
Referee: Dmitriy Mashentsev (Kyrgyzstan)

17 February 2015
18:30 UTC+3

Al-Hidd (Bahrain)	2–1	(Yemen) Al-Saqr
Adnan 17'; Orok 52'	Report	Al-Worafi 64' (pen.)

Bahrain National Stadium, Riffa
Attendance: 480
Referee: Jumpei Iida (Japan)

Notes

1. Teams from Syria were not allowed to host their home matches in their country due to security concerns.
