= Hariss Harun =

Singaporean footballer (born 1990)

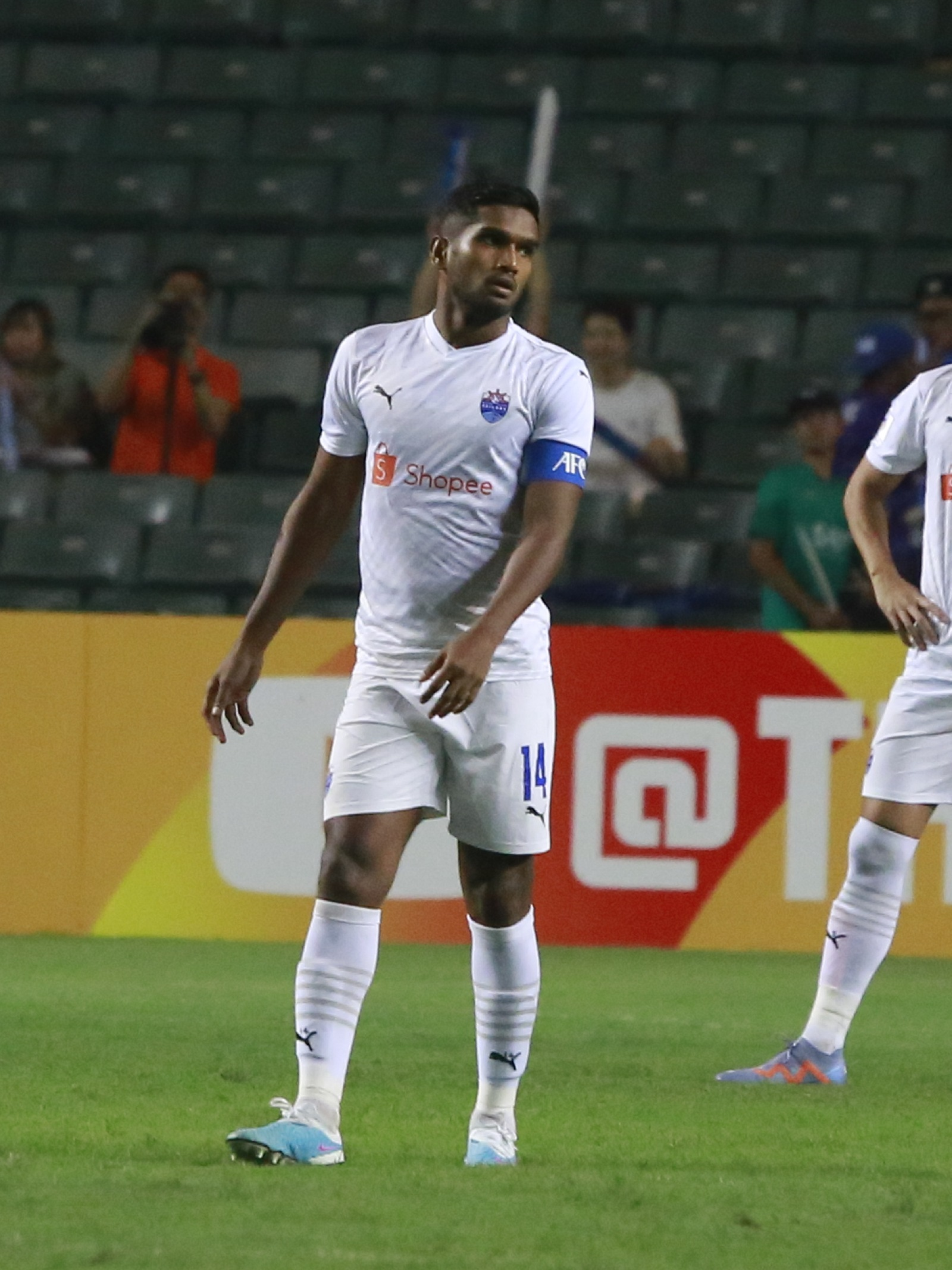
- Hariss Harun playing for Lion City Sailors in 2023

Personal information
- Full name: Hariss bin Harun
- Date of birth: 19 November 1990 (age 35)
- Place of birth: Singapore
- Height: 1.78 m (5 ft 10 in)
- Positions: Defensive midfielder; centre-back

Team information
- Current team: Lion City Sailors
- Number: 14

Youth career
- 2003–2007: National Football Academy

Senior career*
Years	Team	Apps	(Gls)
2007–2011	Young Lions	85	(8)
2012–2013	LionsXII	0	(0)
2014–2021	Johor Darul Ta'zim	53	(4)
2017	→ Hospitalet (loan)	0	(0)
2017	→ Home United (loan)	20	(0)
2021–	Lion City Sailors	101	(4)

International career^{‡}
2006–2013	Singapore U23	0	(0)
2007–	Singapore	160	(11)
Medal record
Men's football
Representing Singapore
Sea Games
Bronze medal – third place	Sea Games 2007	Football
Bronze medal – third place	Sea Games 2009	Football
Bronze medal – third place	Sea Games 2013	Football
Asean Football Championship
Winner	AFF Suzuki Cup 2012	2012
- * Club domestic league appearances and goals as of 1 November 2026 ‡ National team caps and goals as of 1 October 2026

Hariss bin Harun (born 19 November 1990) is a Singaporean professional footballer who plays as a defensive-midfielder or a centre-back and captains both the Singapore Premier League club Lion City Sailors and the Singapore national team. He is Singapore's youngest debutant, making his first international appearance at the age of 16 and 217 days. Hariss is also the current vice-president of Football Association of Singapore.

== Early life and education ==
Born to Singaporean Indian parents of Malayali Muslim origin, a logistics officer, Harun bin Habib Mohamed and a housewife, Nisha binte Mohamed Yusoff. His father is his football advisor. He credits his father and uncle for starting his interest in football since the age of 6.

Hariss received his primary education at St. Michael's Primary School and secondary education at St. Gabriel's Secondary School. He graduated with a diploma in Sport & Wellness Management from Nanyang Polytechnic.

== Club career ==
=== Young Lions ===
Hariss began his career along with Young Lions in the S.League in 2007. He became the youngest S-League player in 2007, aged 16 years 3 months and 18 days. The Football Association of Singapore had granted Hariss special dispensation from a rule that allowed players only of 18 years and above to play.

In August 2007, he was Singapore's winner of Nike's 'Who's The Next' contest and secured a training stint at FC Barcelona's famed academy, La Masia. He trained at the Catalans' youth academy for a week, along with 13 other players from six Asia Pacific countries including South Korea and Japan. He captained the players in three friendly games against players from FC Barcelona's youth academy. Hariss impressed the trainers and returned a week later with the MVP award.

2008 proved to be a difficult year for Hariss as he tore his ligaments in a league match against Super Reds on 26 May when Oh Ddog Yi fell on his right knee. The injury ruled him out for a year, causing him to miss the rest of Singapore's World Cup qualifying campaign as well as the 2008 ASEAN Football Championship.

==== Trials with Shanghai Shenhua ====
With the help of the Football Association of Singapore and the national team coach Radojko Avramović, Hariss underwent a 10-day trial with Chinese Super League side Shanghai Shenhua in July 2010, but was ultimately not offered a contract.

Injury would strike Hariss again in 2010, when he suffered a right leg fracture in a match against India at the 2010 Asian Games on 11 November 2010. The duration of six weeks that Hariss required for the recovery of his fracture eventually meant that he missed out on a second consecutive ASEAN Football Championship.

Hariss' performances were recognized with the S.League 'Young Player of the Year' award in 2010.

=== LionsXII ===
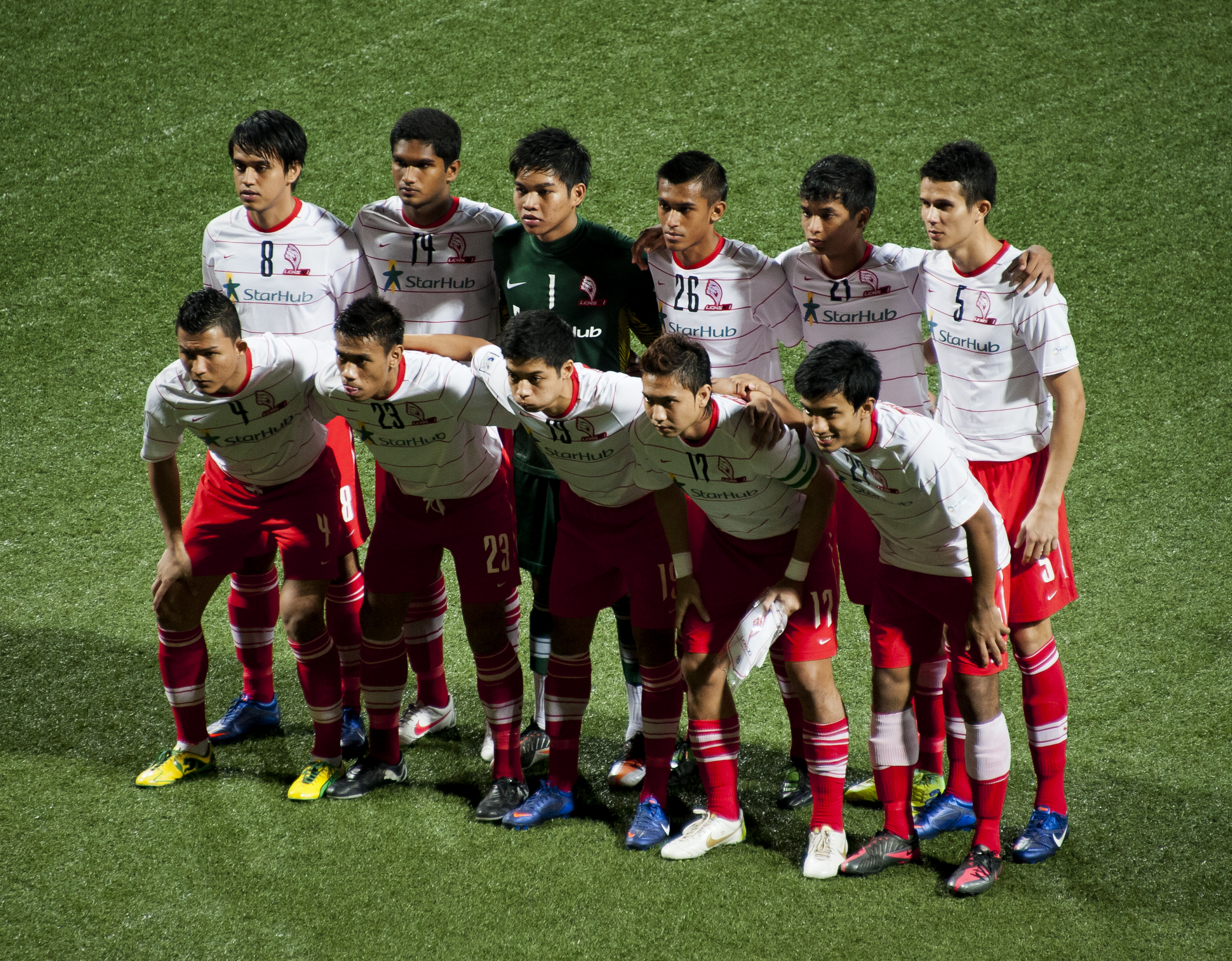
Hariss in the starting line-up for LionsXII against Kuala Lumpur on 17 January 2012

In December 2011, Hariss was called up to join LionsXII to compete in the 2012 Malaysia Super League. He made his LionsXII debut in a league match against Kelantan in January 2012. His first goal came on the 19th minute against Sabah on 21 January. Hariss' goalscoring form against Sabah would continue when the stand-in captain scored his first career hat-trick in a record 9–0 win on 16 June. He scored with a volley three minutes after Agu Casmir's 19th-minute opener and added a second in the 41st minute. He completed his hat-trick with a Shaiful Esah assist on 73 minutes only. Hariss made 34 appearances and scored 5 goals in all competitions as LionsXII finished runners-up in their first season back in Malaysian football.

Hariss missed the start of the 2013 season following a broken right fibula sustained in the 2012 ASEAN Football Championship match against Indonesia. He made his return as a 20th-minute substitute in a 3–0 Super League win over Pahang on 16 February. His first goal of the season came three days later four minutes into a 2–2 draw with Johor Darul Ta'zim. Hariss played a pivotal role for the club as LionsXII capped the successful 2013 season as eventual champions of the Malaysia Super League with an unbeaten home record.

In July 2013, Hariss Harun rejected the offer of a contract from the Portuguese Primeira Liga side, Rio Ave. National Service commitments and salary issues were speculated as reasons why the deal broke down, despite the help of Singapore billionaire Peter Lim and agent Jorge Mendes. Mendes had been negotiating with clubs for one year for Hariss to further his career in Europe. Had Hariss moved abroad, Hariss would have followed the likes of former Singaporean internationals Fandi Ahmad and V. Sundramoorthy in playing for European clubs.

=== Johor Darul Ta'zim ===
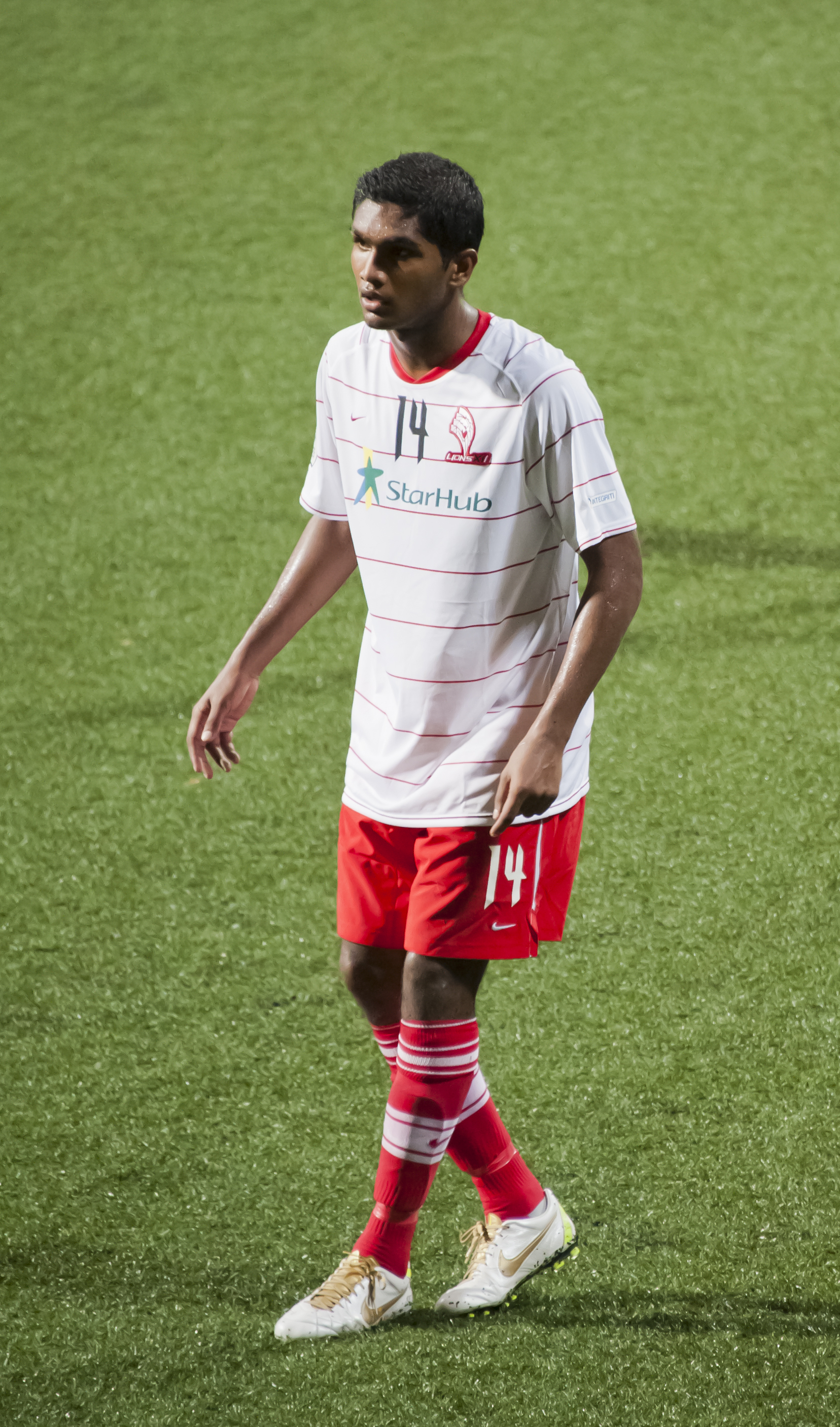
Hariss playing for the LionsXII against Kelantan FA in a 2012 Malaysia Super League match at the Jalan Besar Stadium.

Following Hariss' decision not to join Rio Ave, Malaysia Super League side Johor Darul Ta'zim moved quickly to confirm his signing in a two-year deal worth over US$20,000 (S$25,000) per month in November 2013. On 11 February, Hariss scored his first goal for the club against Kedah in a Malaysia FA Cup match. 4 days later, Hariss scored his first league goal for the club in a Super League match against Selangor. In his first season, Hariss helped Johor win their first Malaysian Super League title. On 31 October 2015, he helped Johor Darul Ta'zim win the 2015 Malaysia Super League and their first 2015 AFC Cup Final against Istiklol in Tajikistan making him the first Singaporean to win the trophy. On 9 November 2015, Hariss signed a new 2-year contract with the club, with a monthly salary of US$30,000 (S$42,700) a month, making him the highest paid Singaporean footballer in history. He scored a header from a corner on the opening match day of the 2016 Malaysia Super League against Selangor FA which ended 1–1 with Johor Darul Ta'zim winning the 2016 Sultan Haji Ahmad Shah Cup on penalties (7–6).

On 14 December, Johor Darul Ta'zim announced that Hariss would be loaned to a Portuguese or Japanese club for a year.

==== Loan to Hospitalet ====
On 2 February 2017, Hariss was about to join Spanish third-tier side, Hospitalet on a one-year loan deal, becoming the first-ever Singaporean to play in the Spanish leagues. Hariss reached Spain on 23 February and began training with CE L'Hospitalet. The loan was cancelled two weeks after Hariss arrived in Spain due to a taxation problem for the Spanish side, resulting in them being unable to register new players. Hariss was left in the limbo as his parent club, JDT, had all their foreign players slots filled. Hariss returned to the S.League with JDT adamant that the move to Hospitalet will still go through in June.

==== Loan to Home United ====
On 10 March 2017, Hariss returned to Singapore to join Home United on a 3-month loan deal. He made his debut for The Protectors on 1 April in a top of the table clash against Albirex Niigata (S) in a 2–2 draw. Later throughout the season, Home United have extended their loan deal for the Lions star Hariss Harun until the end of this season.

=== Return to Johor Darul Ta'zim ===
Hariss returned to Johor for the 2018 season and in the first game of the season against Kedah, he won the 2018 Piala Sumbangsih in which Johor won their third Piala Sumbangsih against. On 10 July 2018, he scored his first goal of the season in a 2–1 victory against Perak FA, which also sealed Johor's fifth consecutive league title.

During the 2019 season, Hariss was made the club captain of JDT. Hariss also captained the team for their debut AFC Champions League campaign. In JDT's first AFC Champions League match against Japanese club, Kashima Antlers, Hariss assisted Diogo in the 80th minute in the game but fall to a 2–1 away defeat. On matchday 2 against Korean club, Gyeongnam, he helped JDT secure their first ever point to a 1-1 draw. On 8 May 2019, matchday 5, he guided JDT to their first victory 1–0 against Kashima Antlers at home. On 12 May, he scored his first league goal of the season in a 2–0 victory against Pahang FA. Hariss ended the season winning the 2019 Malaysia Super League, Malaysia Cup and the 2019 Piala Sumbangsih in his first season as captain of the club.

During the 2020 season, Hariss won the 2020 Malaysia Super League and 2020 Piala Sumbangsih with JDT.

On 5 March 2021, Hariss win his sixth Piala Sumbangish which seems to be his last trophy with JDT. On 30 April 2021, Hariss scored the equalizer for his side in a 1–1 draw against Kuala Lumpur City. After 10 appearance throughout the season, JDT and Hariss have mutually terminated the contract on 10 May in respect of Hariss' decision to return to Singapore due to family matters as the COVID-19 pandemic has made it impossible to travel back home on a more regular basis.

=== Lion City Sailors ===
Hariss signed for Lion City Sailors on a three-and-a-half-year contract on 10 May 2021. During his first season at the club, he helped them to win the Singapore Premier League. The following season, He won the 2022 Singapore Community Shield and captained them to their first ever AFC Champions League group stage appearance.

On 9 December 2023, Hariss lifted the 2023 Singapore Cup after a 3–1 win against defending champion, Hougang United. On 13 December 2023 during the final fixtures of the 2023–24 AFC Champions League group stage match against Hong Kong club, Kitchee, Hariss set a record for the highest number of appearances of 18 by a Singaporean player in the AFC Champions League competition surpassing Daniel Bennett's tally of 17 appearances.

During the 2024–25 AFC Champions League Two home fixture against Chinese club Zhejiang Professional on 19 September 2024, Hariss scored a volley from outside the box in the 44th minute to break the deadlock just before half time. He captained the side to a memorable 2–0 win against Zhejiang Professional. Hariss captained the sailors in the 2025 AFC Champions League Two final against Sharjah on 18 May 2025. He became the first Singaporean to captain a side in a continental final. However, despite Maxime Lestienne's equaliser in the 91st minute of the 2025 AFC Champions League Two final against Sharjah, the Sailors finished as a runner-up after conceding in the 97th minute to finish the game in a 1–2 defeat.

After going the entire 2025–26 season campaign without a goal, Hariss then scored a goal in the 2026–27 season scoring a header from a corner in a 6–0 win over Tanjong Pagar United on 25 October 2026.

== International career ==
=== Youth ===
Hariss has been capped at all youth levels with the Singapore national team. He was part of the Singapore under-23 squad that won the bronze medal at the 2007, 2009 and 2013 SEA Games. Hariss also played in the 2006 Asian Games held in Qatar.

Hariss scored in a 2–1 win over Myanmar U23 during the 2009 SEA Games. In the 2013 edition, Hariss scored in a 2–0 win over Brunei U23 on 13 December 2013. During the Bronze medal match against Causeway rivals, Malaysia U23, Hariss scored a brace in a period of 1 minute setting up a 2–1 win to clinch the bronze medal.

=== Senior ===
Hariss was scouted by national team coach Radojko Avramović who gave him his international debut in a friendly against North Korea on 24 June 2007 when he came on as a 70th-minute substitute. He is the youngest ever player to play for the Singapore national team at the age of 16 years and 217 days, breaking the previous record held by Fandi Ahmad who debuted at 17 years, 3 months and 23 days. Avramović rated Hariss as an "exceptional player" in a 2012 Straits Times interview.

On 12 August 2009, Hariss make his first start for Singapore in a 1–1 draw during a friendly match against China.

Hariss was called up to the Singapore squad for the 2012 AFF Championship. A shin fracture in a group stage loss to Indonesia ruled him out for the rest of the tournament as Singapore won the competition. He had also missed out on the 2008 and 2010 editions of the competition due to injury.

Hariss scored his first senior international goal in the 27th minute of a friendly match against Laos on 7 June 2013.

Along with Zulfahmi Arifin, he has been identified by national team coach Bernd Stange as the future of Singapore's midfield. Stange also assessed that he is capable of playing for a "top European club" and in a strong league like the Bundesliga.

During the 2014 AFF Championship, Hariss scored a brace in a 4–2 win over Myanmar on 26 November 2014.

On 16 June 2015, Hariss was afforded the chance to captain the national team in a 2018 FIFA World Cup qualification group match against Japan. Supposedly a predictable victory for the Japanese team, the match subsequently ended in a shocking 0–0 draw in Saitama.

On 13 June 2017, Hariss captained Singapore during the FAS 125th anniversary friendly match against two time FIFA World Cup champions Argentina where he almost scored a goal from a set piece.

Hariss scored his 7th international goal in a 2–0 friendly victory over Fiji, helping new head coach Fandi Ahmad to his first win.

On 14 November 2019, Hariss made his 100th cap for the national team against Qatar, making him the 13th footballer to have 100 appearances for the national team.

In May 2021, Hariss pulled out of the Singapore team before Singapore's 2022 FIFA World Cup qualifying match against Saudi Arabia for personal reasons.

On 7 November 2021, Hariss tested positive for COVID-19, just one day before the national team is flew to Dubai for a training camp in preparation for the 2020 AFF Championship. He is then placed under isolation and did not join the team in Dubai.

In December 2024, Hariss was called up for the 2024 ASEAN Championship making his seventh appearance in the tournament.

On 18 November 2025, Hariss captained Singapore to a historic 2–1 victory over Hong Kong, securing the nation's qualification for the 2027 AFC Asian Cup on merit for the first time.

During the friendly match against Mongolia on 31 May 2026, Hariss surpassed Daniel Bennett to become Singapore's all-time most-capped player in a 4–0 victory.

Hariss made his 160th cap for the national team in a friendly match against Brazil on 17 November 2026.

=== Others ===
On 24 July 2010, Hariss was drafted into the Singapore Selection XI squad that was to play against Burnley. He captained the side for the fixture, with the match eventually ending in a 1–0 defeat.

Hariss was selected as part of the Singapore Selection squad for The Sultan of Selangor's Cup to be held on 6 May 2017.

== Personal life ==
Hariss was engaged to Syahirah Mohamad in February 2013. They were married on 9 March 2014 in a function hall opposite Jalan Besar Stadium, home ground of LionsXII.

Hariss is featured in eFootball Pro Evolution Soccer 2020 alongside his Singapore teammate Baihakki Khaizan. He will be the second Singaporean to be featured in a video game after Safuwan Baharudin.

Hariss then later became a property agent late 2023.

On 29 April 2025, Hariss become the vice-president of the Football Association of Singapore council, becoming the first active player to be part of the council.

In a podcast interview in December 2025, Hariss has stated that he supported English Premier League club Liverpool and his favourite player was Steven Gerrard where he would then gain the opportunity to meet his idol in October 2026 in Sentosa.

== Career statistics ==
=== Club ===
Updated as of 30 June 2025

Club	Season	League		National cup		League cup		Continental		Total	
Club	Season	Apps	Goals	Apps	Goals	Apps	Goals	Apps	Goals	Apps	Goals
Young Lions	2007	32	4	—		—		—		32	4
Young Lions	2008	13	3	—		—		—		13	3
Young Lions	2009	19	0	0	0	1	0	—		20	0
Young Lions	2010	30	2	4	0	0	0	—		34	2
Young Lions	2011	22	3	—		—		—		22	3
Young Lions	Total	116	12	4	0	1	0	—		121	12
LionsXII	2012	22	5	2	0	10	0	—		34	5
LionsXII	2013	16	2	0	0	8	2	—		24	4
LionsXII	Total	38	7	2	0	18	2	—		58	9
Johor Darul Ta'zim	2014	15	1	3	1	1	1	—		19	3
Johor Darul Ta'zim	2015	17	1	1	1	5	1	12	1	35	4
Johor Darul Ta'zim	2016	18	1	2	0	8	0	7	0	35	1
Johor Darul Ta'zim	Total	50	3	6	2	14	2	19	1	89	8
Hospitalet (loan)	2017	0	0	0	0	0	0	—		0	0
Home United (loan)	2017	20	0	4	0	3	1	2	1	29	2
Home United (loan)	Total	20	0	4	0	3	1	2	1	29	2
Johor Darul Ta'zim	2018	21	1	4	0	7	0	6	0	38	1
Johor Darul Ta'zim	2019	20	1	1	0	10	0	6	0	37	1
Johor Darul Ta'zim	2020	1	0	0	0	0	0	1	0	2	0
Johor Darul Ta'zim	2021	10	1	0	0	0	0	0	0	10	1
Johor Darul Ta'zim	Total	52	3	5	0	17	0	13	0	87	3
Lion City Sailors	2021	10	0	0	0	0	0	0	0	10	0
Lion City Sailors	2022	24	3	3	0	1	0	6	0	34	3
Lion City Sailors	2023	22	0	6	0	0	0	6	0	34	0
Lion City Sailors	2024–25	28	0	6	0	1	0	15 (Note: Includes 10 matches in AFC Champions League Two and 5 matches in ASEAN Club Championship)	1 (Note: 1 goal in AFC Champions League Two)	50	1
Lion City Sailors	2025–26	13	0	0	0	1	0	5 (Note: Includes 3 matches in AFC Champions League Two and 2 matches in ASEAN Club Championship)	0	19	0
Lion City Sailors	Total	97	3	15	0	3	0	32	1	148	4
Career total		372	28	36	0	56	5	66	3	530	36

( – ) indicates unavailable referenced data conforming to reliable sources guidelines.

- Young Lions and LionsXII are ineligible for qualification to AFC competitions in their respective leagues.
- Young Lions withdrew from the Singapore Cup and Singapore League Cup in 2011 due to scheduled participation in the 2011 AFF U-23 Youth Championship.

=== International ===
As of match played 1 October 2026

Appearances and goals by national team and year
National team	Year	Apps	Goals
Singapore	2007	3	0
Singapore	2008	4	0
Singapore	2009	6	0
Singapore	2010	3	0
Singapore	2011	6	0
Singapore	2012	8	0
Singapore	2013	6	1
Singapore	2014	12	2
Singapore	2015	11	1
Singapore	2016	12	0
Singapore	2017	10	1
Singapore	2018	9	4
Singapore	2019	11	1
Singapore	2020	0	0
Singapore	2021	6	1
Singapore	2022	12	0
Singapore	2023	9	0
Singapore	2024	10	0
Singapore	2025	8	0
Singapore	2026	12	0
Total		158	11

Scores and results list Singapore's goal tally first.

List of international goals scored by Hariss Harun
No.	Cap	Date	Venue	Opponent	Score	Result	Competition
1.	32	7 June 2013	New Laos National Stadium, Vientiane, Laos	Laos	2–0	5–2	Friendly
2.	47	26 November 2014	National Stadium, Kallang, Singapore	Myanmar	2–0	4–2	2014 AFF Championship
3.	47	26 November 2014	National Stadium, Kallang, Singapore	Myanmar	3–0	4–2	2014 AFF Championship
4.	52	6 June 2015	Jurong West Sports and Recreation Centre, Jurong West, Singapore	Brunei	2–0	5–1	Friendly
5.	74	10 June 2017	Jalan Besar Stadium, Kallang, Singapore	Chinese Taipei	1–0	1–2	2019 AFC Asian Cup qualification
6.	82	23 March 2018	National Stadium, Kallang, Singapore	Maldives	1–0	3–2	Friendly
7.	85	11 September 2018	Bishan Stadium, Bishan, Singapore	Fiji	1–0	2–0	Friendly
8.	86	12 October 2018	Bishan Stadium, Bishan, Singapore	Mongolia	1–0	2–0	Friendly
9.	87	9 November 2018	National Stadium, Kallang, Singapore	Indonesia	1–0	1–0	2018 AFF Championship
10.	93	8 June 2019	National Stadium, Kallang, Singapore	Solomon Islands	4–3	4–3	Friendly
11.	103	8 December 2021	National Stadium, Kallang, Singapore	Philippines	1–0	2–1	2020 AFF Championship

== Honours ==
=== Club ===
LionsXII

- Malaysia Super League: 2013

Johor Darul Ta'zim

- AFC Cup: 2015
- Malaysia Cup: 2019
- Malaysia Super League: 2014, 2015, 2016, 2018, 2019, 2020
- Malaysia FA Cup: 2016
- Malaysian Charity Shield: 2015, 2016, 2018, 2019, 2020, 2021

Lion City Sailors

- AFC Champions League Two runner-up: 2024–25
- Singapore Premier League: 2021, 2024–25
- Singapore Cup: 2023, 2024–25, 2025–26
- Singapore Community Shield: 2022, 2024; runner-up: 2025

=== International ===
Singapore

- AFF Championship: 2012
- Southeast Asian Games: bronze medal 2007, 2009, 2013

=== Individual ===
- S.League Young Player of the Year: 2010
- ASEAN All-Stars: 2014
- AFF Championship Best XI : 2016
- AFF Championship All-time XI
- ASEAN Football Federation Best XI: 2016, 2017
- Malaysia Super League: Team of the Season XI: 2018, 2019
- Malaysia Super League: Best Asean Player of the Year: 2019

== See also ==
- List of men's footballers with 100 or more international caps
