= 2015 AFC Cup group stage =

The 2015 AFC Cup group stage was played from 24 February to 13 May 2015. A total of 32 teams competed in the group stage to decide the 16 places in the knockout stage of the 2015 AFC Cup.

== Draw ==
The draw for the group stage was held on 11 December 2014, 15:00 UTC+8, at the Petaling Jaya Hilton Hotel in Kuala Lumpur, Malaysia. The 32 teams were drawn into eight groups of four. Teams from the same association could not be drawn into the same group.

The following 32 teams (16 from West Zone, 16 from East Zone) were entered into the group stage draw, which included the 27 automatic qualifiers and the five qualifying play-off winners, whose identity was not known at the time of the draw:

Zone	Teams
West Zone (Groups A–D)	(Iraq) Al-Shorta; (Iraq) Erbil; (Kuwait) Al-Qadsia; Al-Kuwait; (Jordan) Al-Wehdat; (Jordan) Al-Jazeera; (Oman) Al-Nahda; (Bahrain) Riffa; (Lebanon) Al-Nejmeh; (Syria) Al-Wahda; (Palestine) Taraji Wadi Al-Nes; (Tajikistan) Istiklol; (Turkmenistan) Ahal (Winner Play-off West 1); (Bahrain) Al-Hidd (Winner Play-off West 2); (Lebanon) Salam Zgharta (Winner Play-off West 3); (Syria) Al-Jaish (Winner Play-off West 4)
East Zone (Groups E–H)	(Indonesia) Persib Bandung; (Indonesia) Persipura Jayapura; (Hong Kong) Kitchee; (Hong Kong) South China; (Myanmar) Yadanarbon; (Myanmar) Ayeyawady United; (Malaysia) Johor Darul Ta'zim; (Malaysia) Pahang; (India) Bengaluru; (India) East Bengal; (Singapore) Warriors; (Singapore) Balestier Khalsa; (Maldives) New Radiant; (Philippines) Global; (Laos) Lao Toyota; (Maldives) Maziya (Winner Play-off East)

Note: Teams in italics played in the AFC Champions League qualifying play-off, but failed to advance to the AFC Champions League group stage (had they advanced to the AFC Champions League group stage, they would have been replaced by another team from the same association).

== Format ==
In the group stage, each group was played on a home-and-away round-robin basis. The winners and runners-up of each group advanced to the round of 16.

=== Tiebreakers ===
The teams were ranked according to points (3 points for a win, 1 point for a draw, 0 points for a loss). If tied on points, tiebreakers would be applied in the following order:

1. Greater number of points obtained in the group matches between the teams concerned;
2. Goal difference resulting from the group matches between the teams concerned;
3. Greater number of goals scored in the group matches between the teams concerned;
4. Greater number of away goals scored in the group matches between the teams concerned;
5. If, after applying criteria 1 to 4, teams still have an equal ranking, criteria 1 to 4 are reapplied exclusively to the matches between the teams in question to determine their final rankings. If this procedure does not lead to a decision, criteria 6 to 10 apply;
6. Goal difference in all the group matches;
7. Greater number of goals scored in all the group matches;
8. Penalty shoot-out if only two teams are involved and they are both on the field of play;
9. Fewer score calculated according to the number of yellow and red cards received in the group matches (1 point for a single yellow card, 3 points for a red card as a consequence of two yellow cards, 3 points for a direct red card, 4 points for a yellow card followed by a direct red card);
10. Team who belongs to the member association with the higher AFC ranking.

== Groups ==
The matchdays were 24–25 February, 10–11 March, 17–18 March, 14–15 April, 28–29 April, and 12–13 May 2015.

=== Group A ===
Pos	Team	Pld	W	D	L	GF	GA	GD	Pts	Qualification	WEH	WAH	NAH	SZG
1	(Jordan) Al-Wehdat	6	4	1	1	16	3	+13	13	Advance to knockout stage	—	0–1	4–0	5–1
2	(Syria) Al-Wahda	6	3	2	1	8	4	+4	11	Advance to knockout stage	1–1	—	1–2	3–1
3	(Oman) Al-Nahda	6	2	1	3	7	11	−4	7		0–3	0–0	—	4–1
4	(Lebanon) Salam Zgharta	6	1	0	5	5	18	−13	3		0–3	0–2	2–1	—

Source: AFC
Rules for classification: Group stage tiebreakers
24 February 2015
19:00 UTC+4

Al-Wahda (Syria)	1–2	(Oman) Al-Nahda
Jaafar 15'	Report	Voulany 41'; S. Al-Shamsi 68'

Al-Buraimi Sports Complex, Al-Buraimi (Oman)
Attendance: 1,005
Referee: Mooud Bonyadifar (Iran)
24 February 2015
18:00 UTC+2

Al-Wehdat (Jordan)	5–1	(Lebanon) Salam Zgharta
Shelbaieh 7', 82'; Rateb 24'; Za'tara 90+2', 90+3'	Report	Galán 34'

King Abdullah Stadium, Amman
Attendance: 7,000
Referee: Salah Abbas Alabbasi (Bahrain)

10 March 2015
15:00 UTC+2

Salam Zgharta (Lebanon)	0–2	(Syria) Al-Wahda
	Report	Dakka 45'; Hamdoko 90'

Zgharta Stadium, Zgharta
Attendance: 1,847
Referee: Dmitriy Mashentsev (Kyrgyzstan)
10 March 2015
19:00 UTC+4

Al-Nahda (Oman)	0–3	(Jordan) Al-Wehdat
	Report	Abu Amarah 20' (pen.); Za'tara 76'; Elhadji Malick 90+2'

Al-Buraimi Sports Complex, Al-Buraimi
Attendance: 3,000
Referee: Turki Al-Khudhayr (Saudi Arabia)

17 March 2015
15:00 UTC+2

Salam Zgharta (Lebanon)	2–1	(Oman) Al-Nahda
Al Mal 38', 62'	Report	Al-Ruzaiqi 45+2'

Zgharta Stadium, Zgharta
Attendance: 1,033
Referee: Mohsen Torky (Iran)
17 March 2015
18:00 UTC+2

Al-Wehdat (Jordan)	0–1	(Syria) Al-Wahda
	Report	Omari 6' (pen.)

King Abdullah Stadium, Amman
Attendance: 9,500
Referee: Yousef Al-Marzouq (Kuwait)

14 April 2015
19:00 UTC+4

Al-Nahda (Oman)	4–1	(Lebanon) Salam Zgharta
Voulany 14', 19'; Al-Nuaimi 28'; M. Al-Shamsi 90+1'	Report	Galán 48' (pen.)

Al-Buraimi Sports Complex, Al-Buraimi
Attendance: 300
Referee: Salah Abbas Alabbasi (Bahrain)
15 April 2015
16:30 UTC+3

Al-Wahda (Syria)	1–1	(Jordan) Al-Wehdat
Hamdoko 88'	Report	Abu Amarah 27' (pen.)

Al-Hassan Stadium, Irbid (Jordan)
Attendance: 7,200
Referee: Mohsen Torky (Iran)

28 April 2015
15:00 UTC+3

Salam Zgharta (Lebanon)	0–3	(Jordan) Al-Wehdat
	Report	Abu Amarah 25'; Deeb 38'; Elhadji Malick 65'

Zgharta Stadium, Zgharta
Attendance: 854
Referee: Rowan Arumughan (India)
28 April 2015
19:00 UTC+4

Al-Nahda (Oman)	0–0	(Syria) Al-Wahda
	Report

Al-Buraimi Sports Complex, Al-Buraimi
Attendance: 400
Referee: Kim Hee-gon (South Korea)

12 May 2015
16:00 UTC+3

Al-Wehdat (Jordan)	4–0	(Oman) Al-Nahda
Deeb 35'; Elias 38'; Al-Basha 75'; Za'tara 89'	Report

Al-Hassan Stadium, Irbid
Attendance: 1,600
Referee: Ali Shaban (Kuwait)
12 May 2015
16:00 UTC+3

Al-Wahda (Syria)	3–1	(Lebanon) Salam Zgharta
Jaafar 43', 57'; Omari 90'	Report	Al Jassem 90+3'

Zgharta Stadium, Zgharta (Lebanon)
Attendance: 108
Referee: Ali Sabah Adday Al-Qaysi (Iraq)

Notes

1. Teams from Syria were not allowed to host their home matches in their country due to security concerns.

=== Group B ===
Pos	Team	Pld	W	D	L	GF	GA	GD	Pts	Qualification	SHO	JAZ	TWN	HID
1	(Iraq) Al-Shorta	6	2	3	1	14	7	+7	9	Advance to knockout stage	—	4–0	6–2	2–2
2	(Jordan) Al-Jazeera	6	2	3	1	6	7	−1	9	Advance to knockout stage	1–1	—	2–0	1–0
3	(Palestine) Taraji Wadi Al-Nes	6	1	3	2	6	11	−5	6		1–0	1–1	—	1–1
4	(Bahrain) Al-Hidd	6	0	5	1	6	7	−1	5		1–1	1–1	1–1	—

Source: AFC
Rules for classification: Group stage tiebreakers
24 February 2015
16:00 UTC+2

Taraji Wadi Al-Nes (Palestine)	1–1	(Jordan) Al-Jazeera
S. Yousef 90+4'	Report	Al-Nawateer 31'

Faisal Al-Husseini International Stadium, Al-Ram
Attendance: 2,000
Referee: Ali Shaban (Kuwait)
24 February 2015
18:00 UTC+3

Al-Shorta (Iraq)	2–2	(Bahrain) Al-Hidd
Salem 2' (pen.); Kalaf 13'	Report	Rico 28'; Ayyash 45+1'

Grand Hamad Stadium, Doha (Qatar)
Attendance: 50
Referee: Marai Al-Awaji (Saudi Arabia)

10 March 2015
17:00 UTC+2

Al-Jazeera (Jordan)	1–1	(Iraq) Al-Shorta
Franco 12'	Report	Karim 7' (pen.)

King Abdullah Stadium, Amman
Attendance: 700
Referee: Masoud Tufayelieh (Syria)
10 March 2015
18:30 UTC+3

Al-Hidd (Bahrain)	1–1	(Palestine) Taraji Wadi Al-Nes
Adnan 4'	Report	H. Abuhammad 90+4'

Bahrain National Stadium, Riffa
Attendance: 300
Referee: Khurram Shahzad (Pakistan)

17 March 2015
18:00 UTC+3

Al-Shorta (Iraq)	6–2	(Palestine) Taraji Wadi Al-Nes
Abdul-Zahra 20', 35'; Kalaf 34'; Hussein 45+1', 90+1'; Ismail 63'	Report	Zidan 40', 86'

Grand Hamad Stadium, Doha (Qatar)
Attendance: 200
Referee: Timur Faizullin (Kyrgyzstan)
17 March 2015
18:30 UTC+3

Al-Hidd (Bahrain)	1–1	(Jordan) Al-Jazeera
Rico 54'	Report	Abu Hudaib 68'

Khalifa Sports City Stadium, Isa Town
Attendance: 300
Referee: Aziz Asimov (Uzbekistan)

14 April 2015
17:00 UTC+3

Taraji Wadi Al-Nes (Palestine)	1–0	(Iraq) Al-Shorta
S. Yousef 83'	Report

Faisal Al-Husseini International Stadium, Al-Ram
Attendance: 900
Referee: Yaqoob Abdul Baki (Oman)
14 April 2015
18:00 UTC+3

Al-Jazeera (Jordan)	1–0	(Bahrain) Al-Hidd
Al-Natour 75'	Report

King Abdullah Stadium, Amman
Attendance: 800
Referee: Ilgiz Tantashev (Uzbekistan)

28 April 2015
18:00 UTC+3

Al-Jazeera (Jordan)	2–0	(Palestine) Taraji Wadi Al-Nes
Al-Nawateer 26'; Tannous 50'	Report

Al-Hassan Stadium, Irbid
Attendance: 473
Referee: Marai Al-Awaji (Saudi Arabia)
28 April 2015
18:30 UTC+3

Al-Hidd (Bahrain)	1–1	(Iraq) Al-Shorta
Omosuyi 77'	Report	Boukar 82'

Bahrain National Stadium, Riffa
Attendance: 100
Referee: Yousef Al-Marzouq (Kuwait)

12 May 2015
18:45 UTC+3

Al-Shorta (Iraq)	4–0	(Jordan) Al-Jazeera
Hussein 19', 53'; Caion 50'; Salem 76'	Report

Grand Hamad Stadium, Doha (Qatar)
Attendance: 100
Referee: Võ Minh Trí (Vietnam)
12 May 2015
18:45 UTC+3

Taraji Wadi Al-Nes (Palestine)	1–1	(Bahrain) Al-Hidd
Al-Sobakhi 29'	Report	Al Khattal 81'

Faisal Al-Husseini International Stadium, Al-Ram
Attendance: 500
Referee: Ahmed Al-Kaf (Oman)

Notes

2. Teams from Iraq were not allowed to host their home matches in their country due to security concerns.

=== Group C ===
Pos	Team	Pld	W	D	L	GF	GA	GD	Pts	Qualification	IST	QAD	ERB	AHA
1	(Tajikistan) Istiklol	6	3	2	1	12	8	+4	11	Advance to knockout stage	—	2–0	1–3	5–2
2	(Kuwait) Al-Qadsia	6	3	1	2	7	6	+1	10	Advance to knockout stage	2–2	—	1–2	2–0
3	(Iraq) Erbil	6	2	1	3	8	8	0	7		0–0	0–1	—	2–3
4	(Turkmenistan) Ahal	6	2	0	4	8	13	−5	6		1–2	0–1	2–1	—

Source: AFC
Rules for classification: Group stage tiebreakers
25 February 2015
14:00 UTC+5

Istiklol (Tajikistan)	1–3	(Iraq) Erbil
Nadhim 60' (o.g.)	Report	Hussein 35'; Sabah 65'; Salah 75'

Pamir Stadium, Dushanbe
Attendance: 12,000
Referee: Ilgiz Tantashev (Uzbekistan)
25 February 2015
18:00 UTC+3

Al-Qadsia (Kuwait)	2–0	(Turkmenistan) Ahal
Saleh 58'; Abdullah 63'	Report

Al Kuwait Sports Club Stadium, Kuwait City
Attendance: 400
Referee: Ma Ning (China)

11 March 2015
17:00 UTC+5

Ahal (Turkmenistan)	1–2	(Tajikistan) Istiklol
Orazow 28' (pen.)	Report	Fatkhuloev 4'; Makhmudov 66'

Ashgabat Stadium, Ashgabat
Attendance: 14,000
Referee: Khamis Al-Kuwari (Qatar)
11 March 2015
18:00 UTC+3

Erbil (Iraq)	0–1	(Kuwait) Al-Qadsia
	Report	Subotić 77'

Abdullah bin Khalifa Stadium, Doha (Qatar)
Attendance: 50
Referee: Mohsen Torky (Iran)

18 March 2015
17:00 UTC+5

Ahal (Turkmenistan)	2–1	(Iraq) Erbil
Annaýew 29', 90+1'	Report	Salah 30'

Ashgabat Stadium, Ashgabat
Attendance: 6,000
Referee: Jameel Abdulhusin (Bahrain)
18 March 2015
18:40 UTC+3

Al-Qadsia (Kuwait)	2–2	(Tajikistan) Istiklol
Al-Mutawa 3' (pen.), 54'	Report	Dzahlilov 36'; Vasiev 45+1'

Ali Sabah Al-Salem Stadium, Al Farwaniyah
Attendance: 475
Referee: Mohammad Abu Loum (Jordan)

15 April 2015
18:00 UTC+5

Istiklol (Tajikistan)	2–0	(Kuwait) Al-Qadsia
Davronov 53' (pen.); Dzhalilov 63'	Report

Pamir Stadium, Dushanbe
Attendance: 15,000
Referee: Pratap Singh (India)
15 April 2015
19:00 UTC+3

Erbil (Iraq)	2–3	(Turkmenistan) Ahal
Mahmoud 41', 65' (pen.)	Report	Babajanow 47'; Garadanow 73', 75'

Saoud bin Abdulrahman Stadium, Al Wakrah (Qatar)
Attendance: 50
Referee: Adham Makhadmeh (Jordan)

29 April 2015
18:00 UTC+5

Ahal (Turkmenistan)	0–1	(Kuwait) Al-Qadsia
	Report	Al-Mutawa 20'

Ashgabat Stadium, Ashgabat
Attendance: 20,000
Referee: Lee Min-hu (South Korea)
29 April 2015
19:00 UTC+3

Erbil (Iraq)	0–0	(Tajikistan) Istiklol
	Report

Saoud bin Abdulrahman Stadium, Al Wakrah (Qatar)
Attendance: 200
Referee: Masoud Tufayelieh (Syria)

13 May 2015
18:45 UTC+3

Al-Qadsia (Kuwait)	1–2	(Iraq) Erbil
Aman 49'	Report	Salah 45+1'; Khalid 52'

Al Kuwait Sports Club Stadium, Kuwait City
Attendance: 300
Referee: Yaqoob Abdul Baki (Oman)
13 May 2015
20:45 UTC+5

Istiklol (Tajikistan)	5–2	(Turkmenistan) Ahal
Dzhalilov 9', 90+1'; Makhmudov 28'; Bleda 31'; Şermetow 53' (o.g.)	Report	Garadanow 32'; Annadurdyýew 90+3'

Pamir Stadium, Dushanbe
Attendance: 12,000
Referee: Tayeb Shamsuzzaman (Bangladesh)

Notes

3. Teams from Iraq were not allowed to host their home matches in their country due to security concerns.

=== Group D ===
Pos	Team	Pld	W	D	L	GF	GA	GD	Pts	Qualification	JAI	KUW	RIF	NEJ
1	(Syria) Al-Jaish	6	4	2	0	6	1	+5	14	Advance to knockout stage	—	0–0	1–1	1–0
2	Al-Kuwait	6	3	1	2	9	6	+3	10	Advance to knockout stage	0–1	—	2–1	4–1
3	(Bahrain) Riffa	6	2	2	2	7	7	0	8		0–1	2–1	—	2–1
4	(Lebanon) Al-Nejmeh	6	0	1	5	4	12	−8	1		0–2	1–2	1–1	—

Source: AFC
Rules for classification: Group stage tiebreakers
24 February 2015
18:30 UTC+3

Al-Kuwait	4–1	(Lebanon) Al-Nejmeh
Al Saqer 16'; Hakem 52'; Hammami 83'; Hezam 89'	Report	Sy 40'

Al Kuwait Sports Club Stadium, Kuwait City
Attendance: 600
Referee: Ali Sabah Adday Al-Qaysi (Iraq)
25 February 2015
18:30 UTC+3

Riffa (Bahrain)	0–1	(Syria) Al-Jaish
	Report	Moustafa 66'

Bahrain National Stadium, Riffa
Attendance: 300
Referee: Adham Makhadmeh (Jordan)

11 March 2015
14:30 UTC+2

Al-Jaish (Syria)	1–0	(Lebanon) Al-Nejmeh
Salkeni 88'	Report

Zgharta Stadium, Zgharta (Lebanon)
Attendance: 30
Referee: Yaqoob Abdul Baki (Oman)
11 March 2015
18:25 UTC+3

Al-Kuwait	2–1	(Bahrain) Riffa
Al Sanea 51'; Al Buraiki 73'	Report	Deeb 27'

Al Kuwait Sports Club Stadium, Kuwait City
Attendance: 400
Referee: Marai Al-Awaji (Saudi Arabia)

17 March 2015
18:25 UTC+3

Al-Jaish (Syria)	0–0	Al-Kuwait
	Report

Al Kuwait Sports Club Stadium, Kuwait City (Kuwait)
Attendance: 2,000
Referee: Çarymyrat Gurbanow (Turkmenistan)
18 March 2015
18:30 UTC+3

Riffa (Bahrain)	2–1	(Lebanon) Al-Nejmeh
Obregón 5'; Saeed 35'	Report	Takaji 45+2' (pen.)

Bahrain National Stadium, Riffa
Attendance: 100
Referee: Abdulrahman Al-Jassim (Qatar)

15 April 2015
17:00 UTC+3

Al-Nejmeh (Lebanon)	1–1	(Bahrain) Riffa
Atwi 22'	Report	Deeb 32'

Saida Municipal Stadium, Sidon
Attendance: 100
Referee: Timur Faizullin (Kyrgyzstan)
15 April 2015
18:45 UTC+3

Al-Kuwait	0–1	(Syria) Al-Jaish
	Report	Kogale 6'

Al Kuwait Sports Club Stadium, Kuwait City
Attendance: 500
Referee: Khamis Al-Kuwari (Qatar)

29 April 2015
17:00 UTC+3

Al-Nejmeh (Lebanon)	1–2	Al-Kuwait
Sy 22'	Report	Rogerinho 2', 46'

Saida Municipal Stadium, Sidon
Attendance: 300
Referee: Mohammad Abu Loum (Jordan)
29 April 2015
18:30 UTC+3

Al-Jaish (Syria)	1–1	(Bahrain) Riffa
Moustafa 36'	Report	Hashem 73'

Bahrain National Stadium, Riffa (Bahrain)
Attendance: 100
Referee: Khurram Shahzad (Pakistan)

13 May 2015
18:30 UTC+3

Riffa (Bahrain)	2–1	Al-Kuwait
Ahmed 15'; Al Azmi 74' (o.g.)	Report	Al Buraiki 20'

Bahrain National Stadium, Riffa
Attendance: 100
Referee: Turki Al-Khudhayr (Saudi Arabia)
13 May 2015
18:30 UTC+3

Al-Nejmeh (Lebanon)	0–2	(Syria) Al-Jaish
	Report	Moustafa 35' (pen.); Salkeni 84'

Saida Municipal Stadium, Sidon
Attendance: 1
Referee: Mooud Bonyadifar (Iran)

Notes

4. Fixtures between Al-Kuwait and Al-Nejmeh were reversed from original order.
5. Teams from Syria were not allowed to host their home matches in their country due to security concerns.

=== Group E ===
Pos	Team	Pld	W	D	L	GF	GA	GD	Pts	Qualification	PSJ	BGL	MAZ	WAR
1	(Indonesia) Persipura Jayapura	6	5	1	0	17	4	+13	16	Advance to knockout stage	—	3–1	0–0	6–0
2	(India) Bengaluru	6	4	0	2	8	8	0	12	Advance to knockout stage	1–3	—	2–1	1–0
3	(Maldives) Maziya	6	2	1	3	7	6	+1	7		1–2	1–2	—	2–0
4	(Singapore) Warriors	6	0	0	6	1	15	−14	0		1–3	0–1	0–2	—

Source: AFC
Rules for classification: Group stage tiebreakers
24 February 2015
19:30 UTC+8

Warriors (Singapore)	1–3	(Indonesia) Persipura Jayapura
Ahmad 69'	Report	Koné 30'; Boaz 34'; Alom 58'

Jalan Besar Stadium, Singapore
Attendance: 1,117
Referee: Liu Kwok Man (Hong Kong)
24 February 2015
19:30 UTC+5:30

Bengaluru (India)	2–1	(Maldives) Maziya
Chhetri 67'; Sampingiraj 90+3'	Report	Umair 89' (pen.)

Sree Kanteerava Stadium, Bengaluru
Attendance: 6,614
Referee: Aziz Asimov (Uzbekistan)

10 March 2015
15:30 UTC+9

Persipura Jayapura (Indonesia)	3–1	(India) Bengaluru
Kabes 4'; Robertino 23', 50'	Report	Vineeth 90'

Mandala Stadium, Jayapura
Attendance: 16,263
Referee: Wang Di (China)
10 March 2015
16:00 UTC+5

Maziya (Maldives)	2–0	(Singapore) Warriors
Abdulla 47'; Rodríguez 88'	Report

National Football Stadium, Malé
Attendance: 700
Referee: Tayeb Shamsuzzaman (Bangladesh)

17 March 2015
16:00 UTC+5

Maziya (Maldives)	1–2	(Indonesia) Persipura Jayapura
Abdulla 78'	Report	Boaz 35'; Koné 77'

National Football Stadium, Malé
Attendance: 580
Referee: Kim Dae-yong (South Korea)
17 March 2015
19:30 UTC+5:30

Bengaluru (India)	1–0	(Singapore) Warriors
Walker 36' (pen.)	Report

Sree Kanteerava Stadium, Bengaluru
Attendance: 5,264
Referee: Ho Wai Sing (Hong Kong)

14 April 2015
15:30 UTC+9

Persipura Jayapura (Indonesia)	0–0	(Maldives) Maziya
	Report

Mandala Stadium, Jayapura
Attendance: 12,623
Referee: Sivakorn Pu-Udom (Thailand)
14 April 2015
19:30 UTC+8

Warriors (Singapore)	0–1	(India) Bengaluru
	Report	R. Singh 76'

Jalan Besar Stadium, Singapore
Attendance: 988
Referee: Lee Min-hu (South Korea)

28 April 2015
15:30 UTC+9

Persipura Jayapura (Indonesia)	6–0	(Singapore) Warriors
Paulin 19'; Kabes 41', 58'; Boaz 53', 56'; Pangkali 88'	Report

Mandala Stadium, Jayapura
Attendance: 9,823
Referee: Jameel Abdulhusin (Bahrain)
28 April 2015
16:00 UTC+5

Maziya (Maldives)	1–2	(India) Bengaluru
Rodríguez 60'	Report	Chhetri 70' (pen.), 78'

National Football Stadium, Malé
Attendance: 962
Referee: Salah Abbas Alabbasi (Bahrain)

12 May 2015
20:00 UTC+8

Warriors (Singapore)	0–2	(Maldives) Maziya
	Report	Umair 49'; Rodríguez 90+3'

Jalan Besar Stadium, Singapore
Attendance: 631
Referee: Masoud Tufayelieh (Syria)
12 May 2015
19:00 UTC+5:30

Bengaluru (India)	1–3	(Indonesia) Persipura Jayapura
U. Singh 24'	Report	Robertino 29'; Wanggai 72'; Boaz 77'

Sree Kanteerava Stadium, Bengaluru
Attendance: 3,148
Referee: Mohd Nafeez Abdul Wahab (Malaysia)

=== Group F ===
Pos	Team	Pld	W	D	L	GF	GA	GD	Pts	Qualification	JDT	KIT	EBG	BAL
1	(Malaysia) Johor Darul Ta'zim	6	5	0	1	11	3	+8	15	Advance to knockout stage	—	2–0	4–1	3–0
2	(Hong Kong) Kitchee	6	3	2	1	10	6	+4	11	Advance to knockout stage	2–0	—	2–2	3–0
3	(India) East Bengal	6	1	2	3	8	10	−2	5		0–1	1–1	—	3–0
4	(Singapore) Balestier Khalsa	6	1	0	5	3	13	−10	3		0–1	1–2	2–1	—

Source: AFC
Rules for classification: Group stage tiebreakers
24 February 2015
20:00 UTC+8

Kitchee (Hong Kong)	3–0	(Singapore) Balestier Khalsa
Xu Deshuai 21'; Ngan Lok Fung 67'; Tarrés 90'	Report

Mong Kok Stadium, Hong Kong
Attendance: 2,167
Referee: Çarymyrat Gurbanow (Turkmenistan)
24 February 2015
20:45 UTC+8

Johor Darul Ta'zim (Malaysia)	4–1	(India) East Bengal
Nazrin 9'; Safiq 38' (pen.); Suppiah 47'; Safee 53'	Report	Martins 35'

Larkin Stadium, Johor Bahru
Attendance: 12,212
Referee: Sivakorn Pu-Udom (Thailand)

10 March 2015
19:30 UTC+8

Balestier Khalsa (Singapore)	0–1	(Malaysia) Johor Darul Ta'zim
	Report	Asraruddin 90+3'

Jalan Besar Stadium, Singapore
Attendance: 2,180
Referee: Abdulrahman Al-Jassim (Qatar)
10 March 2015
18:00 UTC+5:30

East Bengal (India)	1–1	(Hong Kong) Kitchee
Martins 74'	Report	Belencoso 30'

Salt Lake Stadium, Kolkata
Attendance: 3,501
Referee: Hiroyuki Kimura (Japan)

17 March 2015
20:00 UTC+8

Balestier Khalsa (Singapore)	2–1	(India) East Bengal
Jonathan Xu 6'; Krištić 19'	Report	Omagbemi 82'

Jalan Besar Stadium, Singapore
Attendance: 1,215
Referee: Kao Jung-fang (Chinese Taipei)
17 March 2015
20:00 UTC+8

Kitchee (Hong Kong)	2–0	(Malaysia) Johor Darul Ta'zim
Belencoso 27'; Tarrés 35'	Report

Mong Kok Stadium, Hong Kong
Attendance: 2,277
Referee: Võ Minh Trí (Vietnam)

14 April 2015
18:00 UTC+5:30

East Bengal (India)	3–0	(Singapore) Balestier Khalsa
B. Singh 22'; Hussein 71' (o.g.); Martins 75'	Report

Salt Lake Stadium, Kolkata
Attendance: 1,500
Referee: Kim Dae-yong (South Korea)
14 April 2015
20:45 UTC+8

Johor Darul Ta'zim (Malaysia)	2–0	(Hong Kong) Kitchee
Figueroa 17'; Safiq 44' (pen.)	Report

Larkin Stadium, Johor Bahru
Attendance: 10,154
Referee: Wang Di (China)

28 April 2015
19:30 UTC+8

Balestier Khalsa (Singapore)	1–2	(Hong Kong) Kitchee
Fadhil 33'	Report	Belencoso 14', 61'

Jalan Besar Stadium, Singapore
Attendance: 512
Referee: Sivakorn Pu-Udom (Thailand)
28 April 2015
18:00 UTC+5:30

East Bengal (India)	0–1	(Malaysia) Johor Darul Ta'zim
	Report	Gaikwad 6' (o.g.)

Salt Lake Stadium, Kolkata
Attendance: 100
Referee: Nivon Robesh Gamini (Sri Lanka)

12 May 2015
20:35 UTC+8

Kitchee (Hong Kong)	2–2	(India) East Bengal
Lam Ka Wai 15'; Xu Deshuai 59'	Report	Martins 80'; Lobo 89'

Mong Kok Stadium, Hong Kong
Attendance: 1,372
Referee: Yousef Al-Marzouq (Kuwait)
12 May 2015
20:35 UTC+8

Johor Darul Ta'zim (Malaysia)	3–0	(Singapore) Balestier Khalsa
Safee 76'; Safiq 85'; Figueroa 90'	Report

Larkin Stadium, Johor Bahru
Attendance: 10,110
Referee: Hiroyuki Kimura (Japan)

=== Group G ===
Pos	Team	Pld	W	D	L	GF	GA	GD	Pts	Qualification	SCA	PAH	GLO	YAD
1	(Hong Kong) South China	6	6	0	0	19	3	+16	18	Advance to knockout stage	—	3–1	3–0	3–1
2	(Malaysia) Pahang	6	2	2	2	11	10	+1	8	Advance to knockout stage	0–1	—	0–0	7–4
3	(Philippines) Global	6	1	2	3	5	12	−7	5		1–6	0–0	—	4–1
4	(Myanmar) Yadanarbon	6	1	0	5	10	20	−10	3		0–3	2–3	2–0	—

Source: AFC
Rules for classification: Group stage tiebreakers
25 February 2015
16:00 UTC+6:30

Yadanarbon (Myanmar)	2–3	(Malaysia) Pahang
Stewart 35' (o.g.); Djawa 55' (pen.)	Report	Nwakaeme 6', 12'; Gopi 89'

Mandalarthiri Stadium, Mandalay
Attendance: 10,115
Referee: Rowan Arumughan (India)
25 February 2015
20:00 UTC+8

Global (Philippines)	1–6	(Hong Kong) South China
M. Jónsson 87'	Report	McBreen 2', 27'; Lo Kong Wai 39'; Chan Wai Ho 50'; Awal 66', 75'

Rizal Memorial Stadium, Manila
Attendance: 1,300
Referee: Pratap Singh (India)

11 March 2015
20:00 UTC+8

South China (Hong Kong)	3–1	(Myanmar) Yadanarbon
Lo Kong Wai 13'; Awal 19'; McBreen 38'	Report	Zaw Linn Tun 88'

Mong Kok Stadium, Hong Kong
Attendance: 2,511
Referee: Khamis Al-Marri (Qatar)
11 March 2015
20:45 UTC+8

Pahang (Malaysia)	0–0	(Philippines) Global
	Report

Darul Makmur Stadium, Kuantan
Attendance: 7,000
Referee: Kim Hee-gon (South Korea)

18 March 2015
16:00 UTC+6:30

Yadanarbon (Myanmar)	2–0	(Philippines) Global
Djawa 52'; Win Htay Kyaw 90+4'	Report

Mandalarthiri Stadium, Mandalay
Attendance: 1,550
Referee: Sukhbir Singh (Singapore)
18 March 2015
20:45 UTC+8

Pahang (Malaysia)	0–1	(Hong Kong) South China
	Report	Chan Siu Ki 13'

Darul Makmur Stadium, Kuantan
Attendance: 5,400
Referee: Fu Ming (China)

15 April 2015
20:00 UTC+8

South China (Hong Kong)	3–1	(Malaysia) Pahang
Chan Siu Kwan 10'; Lo Kong Wai 53'; Sealy 56'	Report	Nwakaeme 62'

Mong Kok Stadium, Hong Kong
Attendance: 2,820
Referee: Sukhbir Singh (Singapore)
15 April 2015
20:00 UTC+8

Global (Philippines)	4–1	(Myanmar) Yadanarbon
Hartmann 16' (pen.), 40'; Bahadoran 60'; González 83'	Report	Yan Paing 19'

Philippine Sports Stadium, Bocaue
Attendance: 2,000
Referee: Nivon Robesh Gamini (Sri Lanka)

29 April 2015
20:00 UTC+8

South China (Hong Kong)	3–0	(Philippines) Global
Cheng Lai Hin 40'; Mališić 55'; McBreen 90+2'	Report

Mong Kok Stadium, Hong Kong
Attendance: 1,708
Referee: Tayeb Shamsuzzaman (Bangladesh)
29 April 2015
20:45 UTC+8

Pahang (Malaysia)	7–4	(Myanmar) Yadanarbon
Nwakaeme 7', 32', 59'; Conti 18'; Saarvindaran 48', 87'; Hafiz 85'	Report	Djawa 45+1'; Hlaing Bo Bo 58', 68'; Win Naing Soe 90+1'

Darul Makmur Stadium, Kuantan
Attendance: 2,758
Referee: Yu Ming-hsun (Chinese Taipei)

13 May 2015
19:00 UTC+8

Global (Philippines)	0–0	(Malaysia) Pahang
	Report

Philippine Sports Stadium, Bocaue
Attendance: 2,000
Referee: Tan Hai (China)
13 May 2015
18:00 UTC+6:30

Yadanarbon (Myanmar)	0–3	(Hong Kong) South China
	Report	McBreen 27', 60'; Lam Hok Hei 40'

Mandalarthiri Stadium, Mandalay
Attendance: 500
Referee: Timur Faizullin (Kyrgyzstan)

=== Group H ===
Pos	Team	Pld	W	D	L	GF	GA	GD	Pts	Qualification	PSB	AYE	NRA	LAO
1	(Indonesia) Persib Bandung	6	3	3	0	10	5	+5	12	Advance to knockout stage	—	3–3	4–1	1–0
2	(Myanmar) Ayeyawady United	6	2	4	0	13	9	+4	10	Advance to knockout stage	1–1	—	0–0	4–3
3	(Maldives) New Radiant	6	1	2	3	4	10	−6	5		0–1	0–3	—	2–1
4	(Laos) Lao Toyota	6	0	3	3	7	10	−3	3		0–0	2–2	1–1	—

Source: AFC
Rules for classification: Group stage tiebreakers
25 February 2015
15:00 UTC+7

Persib Bandung (Indonesia)	4–1	(Maldives) New Radiant
Jufriyanto 15'; Konaté 42'; Atep 45+1'; Yandi 90+2'	Report	Ali 60'

Jalak Harupat Soreang Stadium, Bandung
Attendance: 15,000
Referee: Fu Ming (China)
25 February 2015
18:00 UTC+7

Lao Toyota (Laos)	2–2	(Myanmar) Ayeyawady United
Sitthideth 63'; Phatthana 65'	Report	Naumov 21', 57'

New Laos National Stadium, Vientiane
Attendance: 1,500
Referee: Sukhbir Singh (Singapore)

11 March 2015
15:30 UTC+6:30

Ayeyawady United (Myanmar)	1–1	(Indonesia) Persib Bandung
Fonseca 58'	Report	Atep 45'

Thuwunna Stadium, Yangon
Attendance: 500
Referee: Pratap Singh (India)
11 March 2015
16:00 UTC+5

New Radiant (Maldives)	2–1	(Laos) Lao Toyota
Okoro 69'; Ali 88' (pen.)	Report	Maitee 38'

National Football Stadium, Malé
Attendance: 2,375
Referee: Liu Kwok Man (Hong Kong)

18 March 2015
15:00 UTC+7

Persib Bandung (Indonesia)	1–0	(Laos) Lao Toyota
Atep 20'	Report

Jalak Harupat Soreang Stadium, Bandung
Attendance: 18,552
Referee: Nivon Robesh Gamini (Sri Lanka)
18 March 2015
16:00 UTC+5

New Radiant (Maldives)	0–3	(Myanmar) Ayeyawady United
	Report	Fonseca 34'; Naumov 86', 90+3'

National Football Stadium, Malé
Attendance: 2,452
Referee: Mohd Nafeez Abdul Wahab (Malaysia)

15 April 2015
15:30 UTC+6:30

Ayeyawady United (Myanmar)	0–0	(Maldives) New Radiant
	Report

Thuwunna Stadium, Yangon
Attendance: 200
Referee: Khurram Shahzad (Pakistan)
15 April 2015
18:00 UTC+7

Lao Toyota (Laos)	0–0	(Indonesia) Persib Bandung
	Report

New Laos National Stadium, Vientiane
Attendance: 120
Referee: Mohd Nafeez Abdul Wahab (Malaysia)

29 April 2015
15:30 UTC+6:30

Ayeyawady United (Myanmar)	4–3	(Laos) Lao Toyota
Fonseca 9', 86'; Naumov 69' (pen.), 80'	Report	Phatthana 28' (pen.); Maitee 42'; Honma 74'

Thuwunna Stadium, Yangon
Attendance: 120
Referee: Fu Ming (China)
29 April 2015
16:00 UTC+5

New Radiant (Maldives)	0–1	(Indonesia) Persib Bandung
	Report	Ridwan 14'

National Football Stadium, Malé
Attendance: 500
Referee: Võ Minh Trí (Vietnam)

13 May 2015
16:00 UTC+7

Persib Bandung (Indonesia)	3–3	(Myanmar) Ayeyawady United
Supardi 29'; Ridwan 52'; Konaté 90' (pen.)	Report	Naumov 44', 76' (pen.); Nay Lin Aung 90+3'

Jalak Harupat Soreang Stadium, Bandung
Attendance: 12,250
Referee: Wang Di (China)
13 May 2015
18:00 UTC+7

Lao Toyota (Laos)	1–1	(Maldives) New Radiant
Honma 82'	Report	Fasir 34'

New Laos National Stadium, Vientiane
Attendance: 200
Referee: Ng Chiu Kok (Hong Kong)
