= 2015 AFC Cup knockout stage =

Asian club football tournament

The 2015 AFC Cup knockout stage was played from 26 May to 31 October 2015. A total of 16 teams competed in the knockout stage to decide the champions of the 2015 AFC Cup.

== Qualified teams ==
The winners and runners-up of each of the eight groups in the group stage qualified for the knockout stage. Both West Zone and East Zone had eight teams qualified.

Zone	Group	Winners	Runners-up
West Zone (Groups A–D)	A	(Jordan) Al-Wehdat	(Syria) Al-Wahda
West Zone (Groups A–D)	B	(Iraq) Al-Shorta	(Jordan) Al-Jazeera
West Zone (Groups A–D)	C	(Tajikistan) Istiklol	(Kuwait) Al-Qadsia
West Zone (Groups A–D)	D	(Syria) Al-Jaish	Al-Kuwait
East Zone (Groups E–H)	E	(Indonesia) Persipura Jayapura	(India) Bengaluru
East Zone (Groups E–H)	F	(Malaysia) Johor Darul Ta'zim	(Hong Kong) Kitchee
East Zone (Groups E–H)	G	(Hong Kong) South China	(Malaysia) Pahang
East Zone (Groups E–H)	H	(Indonesia) Persib Bandung	(Myanmar) Ayeyawady United

== Format ==
In the knockout stage, the 16 teams played a single-elimination tournament. In the quarter-finals and semi-finals, each tie was played on a home-and-away two-legged basis, while in the round of 16 and final, each tie was played as a single match. The away goals rule (for two-legged ties), extra time (away goals would not apply in extra time) and penalty shoot-out were used to decide the winner if necessary.

== Schedule ==
The schedule of each round was as follows.

Round	First leg	Second leg
Round of 16	26–27 May 2015	
Quarter-finals	25–26 August 2015	15–16 September 2015
Semi-finals	29–30 September 2015	20–21 October 2015
Final	31 October 2015	

== Bracket ==
In the round of 16, the winners of one group played the runners-up of another group in the same zone, with the group winners hosting the match. The matchups were determined as follows:

West Zone

- Winner Group A vs. Runner-up Group C
- Winner Group C vs. Runner-up Group A
- Winner Group B vs. Runner-up Group D
- Winner Group D vs. Runner-up Group B

East Zone

- Winner Group E vs. Runner-up Group G
- Winner Group G vs. Runner-up Group E
- Winner Group F vs. Runner-up Group H
- Winner Group H vs. Runner-up Group F

The draw for the quarter-finals was held on 18 June 2015, 15:00 UTC+8, at the Grand Millennium Hotel in Kuala Lumpur, Malaysia. Teams from different zones could be drawn into the same tie, and there was no seeding or country protection, so teams from the same association could be drawn into the same tie.

In the semi-finals, the matchups were determined by the quarter-final draw: Winner QF1 vs. Winner QF2 and Winner QF3 vs. Winner QF4, with winners QF2 and QF4 hosting the second leg.

In the final, the host team was determined by a draw, held after the quarter-final draw.

Round of 16
(Iraq) Al-Shorta	0
Al-Kuwait	2
(Indonesia) Persib Bandung	0
(Hong Kong) Kitchee	2
(Tajikistan) Istiklol (pen.)	1(4)
(Syria) Al-Wahda	1(2)
(Indonesia) Persipura Jayapura	0
(Malaysia) Pahang (awd.)	3
(Jordan) Al-Wehdat	0
(Kuwait) Al-Qadsia	1
(Syria) Al-Jaish	1
(Jordan) Al-Jazeera	0
(Malaysia) Johor Darul Ta'zim	5
(Myanmar) Ayeyawady United	0
(Hong Kong) South China	2
(India) Bengaluru	0

Quarter-finals
Al-Kuwait	6	1	7
(Hong Kong) Kitchee	0	1	1
(Tajikistan) Istiklol	4	1	5
(Malaysia) Pahang	0	3	3
(Kuwait) Al-Qadsia	3	0	3
(Syria) Al-Jaish	0	2	2
(Malaysia) Johor Darul Ta'zim	1	3	4
(Hong Kong) South China	1	1	2

Semi-finals
Al-Kuwait	4	—	—
(Tajikistan) Istiklol (w/o)	0	—	—
(Kuwait) Al-Qadsia	3	—	—
(Malaysia) Johor Darul Ta'zim (w/o)	1	—	—

Final
(Tajikistan) Istiklol	0
(Malaysia) Johor Darul Ta'zim	1

== Round of 16 ==
Team 1	Score	Team 2
West Zone
Al-Wehdat (Jordan)	0–1	(Kuwait) Al-Qadsia
Istiklol (Tajikistan)	1–1 (a.e.t.) (4–2 p)	(Syria) Al-Wahda
Al-Shorta (Iraq)	0–2	Al-Kuwait
Al-Jaish (Syria)	1–0	(Jordan) Al-Jazeera
East Zone
Persipura Jayapura (Indonesia)	0–3 (awd.)	(Malaysia) Pahang
South China (Hong Kong)	2–0	(India) Bengaluru
Johor Darul Ta'zim (Malaysia)	5–0	(Myanmar) Ayeyawady United
Persib Bandung (Indonesia)	0–2	(Hong Kong) Kitchee

26 May 2015
15:30 UTC+9

Persipura Jayapura (Indonesia)	Cancelled 0–3 (Awarded)	(Malaysia) Pahang
	Report

Mandala Stadium, Jayapura
Referee: Adham Makhadmeh (Jordan)

The Persipura Jayapura v Pahang match was not played as scheduled as Pahang players were denied entry into Indonesia due to visa issues. The AFC announced on 10 June 2015 that as a result, Persipura Jayapura forfeited the match and was considered to have lost the match by 3–0, based on the AFC Cup 2015 Competition Regulations and the AFC Disciplinary Code.

26 May 2015
20:00 UTC+8

South China (Hong Kong)	2–0	(India) Bengaluru
McBreen 28' (pen.), 58'	Report

Mong Kok Stadium, Hong Kong
Attendance: 3,381
Referee: Abdulrahman Al-Jassim (Qatar)

26 May 2015
20:00 UTC+5

Istiklol (Tajikistan)	1–1 (a.e.t.)	(Syria) Al-Wahda
Al Kurdi 34' (o.g.)	Report	Al Kurdi 21'
Penalties
Davronov (penalty scored); Nazarov (penalty scored); Fatkhuloev (penalty scored); Umarbaev (penalty scored)	4–2	(penalty missed) Omari; (penalty scored) Kataya; (penalty scored) Hamdoko; (penalty missed) Khadouj

Pamir Stadium, Dushanbe
Attendance: 17,100
Referee: Jumpei Iida (Japan)

26 May 2015
19:00 UTC+3

Al-Wehdat (Jordan)	0–1	(Kuwait) Al-Qadsia
	Report	Al Ansari 76'

Al-Hassan Stadium, Irbid
Attendance: 10,000
Referee: Kim Sang-woo (South Korea)

27 May 2015
15:00 UTC+7

Persib Bandung (Indonesia)	0–2	(Hong Kong) Kitchee
	Report	Belencoso 32'; Lam Ka Wai 44'

Jalak Harupat Soreang Stadium, Bandung
Attendance: 12,352
Referee: Dmitriy Mashentsev (Kyrgyzstan)

27 May 2015
20:45 UTC+8

Johor Darul Ta'zim (Malaysia)	5–0	(Myanmar) Ayeyawady United
Safiq 1'; Figueroa 46', 90+1'; Díaz 61', 74'	Report

Larkin Stadium, Johor Bahru
Attendance: 16,850
Referee: Jameel Abdulhusin (Bahrain)

27 May 2015
18:00 UTC+3

Al-Jaish (Syria)	1–0	(Jordan) Al-Jazeera
Sharifa 90' (pen.)	Report

Al-Hassan Stadium, Irbid (Jordan)
Attendance: 300
Referee: Liu Kwok Man (Hong Kong)

27 May 2015
19:00 UTC+3

Al-Shorta (Iraq)	0–2	Al-Kuwait
	Report	Al Buraiki 80' (pen.); Rogerinho 90+4'

Grand Hamad Stadium, Doha (Qatar)
Attendance: 165
Referee: Tan Hai (China)

Notes

1. Teams from Syria were not allowed to host their home matches in their country due to security concerns.
2. Teams from Iraq were not allowed to host their home matches in their country due to security concerns.

== Quarter-finals ==
Team 1	Agg.	Team 2	1st leg	2nd leg
Al-Qadsia (Kuwait)	3–2	(Syria) Al-Jaish	3–0	0–2
Johor Darul Ta'zim (Malaysia)	4–2	(Hong Kong) South China	1–1	3–1
Al-Kuwait	7–1	(Hong Kong) Kitchee	6–0	1–1
Istiklol (Tajikistan)	5–3	(Malaysia) Pahang	4–0	1–3

=== First leg ===
25 August 2015
20:45 UTC+8

Johor Darul Ta'zim (Malaysia)	1–1	(Hong Kong) South China
Figueroa 49' (pen.)	Report	Awal 63'

Larkin Stadium, Johor Bahru
Attendance: 14,700
Referee: Ahmed Al-Kaf (Oman)

25 August 2015
19:00 UTC+3

Al-Qadsia (Kuwait)	3–0	(Syria) Al-Jaish
Al Ansari 12'; Fuakumputu 64'; Al-Mutawa 69'	Report

Al Kuwait Sports Club Stadium, Kuwait City
Attendance: 3,000
Referee: Ma Ning (China)

26 August 2015
20:00 UTC+5

Istiklol (Tajikistan)	4–0	(Malaysia) Pahang
Chahjouyi 35'; Vasiev 36', 77'; Makhmudov 51'	Report

Pamir Stadium, Dushanbe
Attendance: 15,000
Referee: Adham Makhadmeh (Jordan)

26 August 2015
20:15 UTC+3

Al-Kuwait	6–0	(Hong Kong) Kitchee
Rogerinho 12', 52'; Al Enezi 21'; Hammami 45+4'; Vinícius 82' (pen.); Al Kandari 90+2'	Report

Al Kuwait Sports Club Stadium, Kuwait City
Attendance: 800
Referee: Hettikamkanamge Perera (Sri Lanka)

=== Second leg ===
15 September 2015
20:00 UTC+8

South China (Hong Kong)	1–3	(Malaysia) Johor Darul Ta'zim
Awal 28'	Report	Mahali 26'; Safee 30', 45+2'

Mong Kok Stadium, Hong Kong
Attendance: 6,412
Referee: Fahad Al-Marri (Qatar)

Johor Darul Ta'zim won 4–2 on aggregate.

15 September 2015
18:30 UTC+3

Al-Jaish (Syria)	2–0	(Kuwait) Al-Qadsia
Ebrahim 35' (o.g.); Al-Baher 51'	Report

Al Kuwait Sports Club Stadium, Kuwait City (Kuwait)
Attendance: 1,500
Referee: Abdulrahman Al-Jassim (Qatar)

Al-Qadsia won 3–2 on aggregate.

16 September 2015
20:00 UTC+8

Kitchee (Hong Kong)	1–1	Al-Kuwait
Paulinho 9'	Report	Al Hajri 49'

Mong Kok Stadium, Hong Kong
Attendance: 1,392
Referee: Jarred Gillett (Australia)

Al-Kuwait won 7–1 on aggregate.

16 September 2015
20:45 UTC+8

Pahang (Malaysia)	3–1	(Tajikistan) Istiklol
Hafiz 31', 58'; Saarvindran 90+2'	Report	Makhmudov 61'

Darul Makmur Stadium, Kuantan
Attendance: 1,309
Referee: Abdullah Al Hilali (Oman)

Istiklol won 5–3 on aggregate.

Notes

3. Teams from Syria were not allowed to host their home matches in their country due to security concerns.

== Semi-finals ==
Team 1	Agg.	Team 2	1st leg	2nd leg
Al-Qadsia (Kuwait)	w/o	(Malaysia) Johor Darul Ta'zim	3–1	Cancelled
Al-Kuwait	w/o	(Tajikistan) Istiklol	4–0	Cancelled

=== First leg ===
29 September 2015
19:20 UTC+3

Al-Qadsia (Kuwait)	3-1	(Malaysia) Johor Darul Ta'zim
Fuakumputu 33'; Al-Mutawa 42' (pen.); Soumah 58'	Report	Amri 82'

Al Kuwait Sports Club Stadium, Kuwait City
Attendance: 1,501
Referee: Ko Hyung-jin (South Korea)

30 September 2015
19:20 UTC+3

Al-Kuwait	4–0	(Tajikistan) Istiklol
Vinícius 40', 80' (pen.), 86' (pen.); Al Harbi 90+2'	Report

Al Kuwait Sports Club Stadium, Kuwait City
Attendance: 350
Referee: Mohsen Torky (Iran)

=== Second leg ===
On 16 October 2015, the Kuwait Football Association was suspended by FIFA. As a result, both Al-Qadsia and Al-Kuwait were no longer eligible to compete in the AFC Cup. The second legs of both semi-finals were cancelled, and Johor Darul Ta'zim and Istiklol advanced to the final by walkover.

20 October 2015
20:45 UTC+8

Johor Darul Ta'zim (Malaysia)	Cancelled	(Kuwait) Al-Qadsia
	Report

Larkin Stadium, Johor Bahru
Referee: Ma Ning (China)

21 October 2015
18:00 UTC+5

Istiklol (Tajikistan)	Cancelled	Al-Kuwait
	Report

Pamir Stadium, Dushanbe
Referee: Valentin Kovalenko (Uzbekistan)

== Final ==
Team 1	Score	Team 2
Istiklol (Tajikistan)	0–1	(Malaysia) Johor Darul Ta'zim

31 October 2015
17:00 UTC+5

Istiklol (Tajikistan)	0–1	(Malaysia) Johor Darul Ta'zim
	Report	Velázquez 23'

Pamir Stadium, Dushanbe
Attendance: 18,000
Referee: Minoru Tōjō (Japan)
