= Zgharta Sports Complex =

Stadium in Zgharta, Lebanon

- ملعب المرداشية
- Mirdachiyyé Stadium
- Interactive map of Zgharta Sports Complex
- Location: Zgharta, Lebanon
- Coordinates: 34°24′09″N 35°54′11″E
- Operator: Salam Zgharta FC
- Capacity: 5,000
- Surface: Artificial turf

Tenant
- Salam Zgharta FC

The Zgharta Sports Complex, commonly known as the Mirdachiyyé Stadium (Arabic: ملعب المرداشية), is a 50,000 capacity stadium in Zgharta, Lebanon. It is currently used for football matches and is the home ground of Salam Zgharta FC, as well as of other clubs in Zgharta.

The stadium underwent renovation between June and August 2022, in order to host matches in the 2022–23 Lebanese Premier League season. The "FIFA Goal" project helped implement artificial turf.
