= Twellman =

Twellman is a surname. Notable people with the name include:

- Mike Twellman (born 1960), American soccer defender
- Steve Twellman (born 1949), American soccer left back
- Taylor Twellman (born 1980), American soccer forward and analyst
- Tim Twellman (born 1955), American soccer forward
