= 1992 Canadian Soccer League season =

Canadian Soccer League
- Season: 1992
- Dates: May 26 – September 8 (regular season); September 16 – October 4 (playoffs)
- Champions: Winnipeg Fury
- Regular season leader: Vancouver 86ers
- Matches: 60
- Goals: 176 (2.93 per match)
- Top goalscorer: (Canada) Eddy Berdusco (14)
- Best goalkeeper: (Canada) Paolo Ceccarelli (0.78 GAA)

The 1992 Canadian Soccer League season was the sixth and final season of play for the Canadian Soccer League, a Division 1 men's soccer league in the Canadian soccer pyramid.

== Format and changes from previous season ==
Shortly before the 1992 season, the Hamilton Steelers, Nova Scotia Clippers, and Kitchener Kickers folded. The league was not doing well financially either and Montreal Supra owner Frank Aliaga was named the new league president, replacing the interim president Mario DiBartolomeo, who was the owner of the now-folded Hamilton Steelers. Hamilton folded despite offers of cost sharing with the Vancouver and Montreal team owners.

The London Lasers returned from a one-year hiatus, leaving the league with a six-team division. The league had a balanced schedule with each team playing the others a total of four times, twice each home and away. Due to the drop in teams, only four teams qualified for the playoffs. For the first time, the Championship final would not be a one-off match, but instead would be a two-tie fixture as the other rounds.

Two teams (Montreal and Vancouver) participated in the Professional Cup alongside the five APSL clubs and one from the NPSL. Neither CSL side was able to advance out of the first round.

As 1991 CSL champions, Vancouver qualified for the 1992 CONCACAF Champions' Cup, however, they withdrew from the tournament before their first match.

== Summary ==
Vancouver once again won the regular season title and advanced to the MITA Cup finals for the fifth consecutive year, where they met the Winnipeg Fury in the final. Winnipeg won the title becoming only the third club to win the championship, ending Vancouver's four-year winning streak, snapping Vancouver's 15 match playoff winning streak, handing them their first playoff loss since 1987.

== Regular season ==
Pos	Team	Pld	W	D	L	GF	GA	GD	Pts	Qualification
1	Vancouver 86ers	20	11	3	6	42	28	+14	36	Playoffs
2	North York Rockets	20	8	6	6	25	20	+5	30	Playoffs
3	Winnipeg Fury (O)	20	8	1	11	27	43	−16	25	Playoffs
4	Montreal Supra	20	6	7	7	29	24	+5	25	Playoffs
5	London Lasers	20	6	7	7	25	32	−7	22 (Note: London and Toronto deducted 3 points each for unsportsmanlike conduct during their match on August 30.)	
6	Toronto Blizzard	20	6	6	8	28	29	−1	21	

Source: Canadian Soccer History Archives 1992 CSL Stats
(O) Play-off winners

== Playoffs ==
The playoffs were conducted with a total points system. Teams earned two points for a win, one point for a draw, and zero points for a loss. The team with the most points following the two-game series advanced. If the teams were tied on points, they played a 30-minute mini-game for a bonus point, followed by a penalty shootout if the mini-game remained tied.

Semi-finals
1	Vancouver 86ers	1	1	3 PTS
4	Montreal Supra	1	0	1 PTS
2	North York Rockets	1	0	1 PTS
3	Winnipeg Fury	1	4	3 PTS

Final
1	Vancouver 86ers	0	1	1 PTS
3	Winnipeg Fury	2	1	3 PTS

=== Semifinal ===
September 16, 1992	Montreal Supra	1–1	Vancouver 86ers	Montreal, Quebec
20:00	Needham 90'	[ Report]	Titotto 11'	Stadium: Claude Robilliard Stadium; Attendance: 1,009; Referee: J. Jerome

September 20, 1992	Vancouver 86ers	1–0	Montreal Supra	Vancouver, British Columbia
21:30	Easton 29'	[ Report]		Stadium: Swangard Stadium; Attendance: 3,728; Referee: Rob Brown

Vancouver won the series 3–1 on points.

September 16, 1992	Winnipeg Fury	1–1	North York Rockets	Winnipeg, Manitoba
20:30	Nocita 61'	[ Report]	Berdusco 46'	Stadium: Winnipeg Stadium; Attendance: 1,823; Referee: Mario Perrino

September 20, 1992	North York Rockets	0–4	Winnipeg Fury	North York, Ontario
15:30		[ Report]	Corazzin 13', 28'; Dodd 54'; Holness 90'	Stadium: Esther Shiner Stadium; Attendance: 2,290; Referee: Tony Camacho

Winnipeg won the series 3–1 on points.

=== Final ===
September 27, 1992	Winnipeg Fury	2–0	Vancouver 86ers	Winnipeg, Manitoba
19:30	Nocita; Holness	[ Report]		Stadium: Winnipeg Stadium; Attendance: 1,513; Referee: Dino Bucci

October 4, 1992	Vancouver 86ers	1–1	Winnipeg Fury	Vancouver, British Columbia
21:00	Mitchell	[ Report]	Steve Millar	Stadium: Swangard Stadium; Attendance: 6,087; Referee: Mike Seifert

Winnipeg won the series 3–1 on points.

== Statistics ==
=== Top scorers ===
Rank	Player	Club	Goals
1	(Canada) Eddy Berdusco	North York Rockets	14
2	(Canada) Carlo Corazzin	Winnipeg Fury	8
2	(Canada) Geoff Aunger	London Lasers	8
4	(Chile) Marco Abascal	Toronto Blizzard	6
4	(Canada) John Catliff	Vancouver 86ers	6
4	(Canada) Doug Muirhead	Vancouver 86ers	6
4	(Canada) Dale Mitchell	Vancouver 86ers	6
8	(Canada) Grant Needham	Montreal Supra	5

=== Top goaltenders ===
Rank	Player	Club	GAA
1	(Canada) Paolo Ceccarelli	North York Rockets	0.78
2	(Canada) Pat Onstad	Winnipeg Fury	0.93
3	(Canada) Shel Brodsgaard	North York Rockets	1.18
4	(Canada) Pat Harrington	Montreal Supra	1.20
5	(Canada) Bryan Rosenfeld	London Lasers	1.25

== Honours ==
The following awards and nominations were awarded for the 1992 season.

=== Awards ===
Award	Player	Team
Most Valuable Player	(Canada) Eddy Berdusco	North York Rockets
Rookie of the Year	(Canada) Carlo Corazzin	Winnipeg Fury
Top Newcomer	(United States) Brad Smith	London Lasers
Top Goaltender	(Canada) Paolo Ceccarelli	North York Rangers
Fair Play Award	Vancouver 86ers	

=== League All-Stars ===
Player	Position
(Canada) Pat Onstad (Winnipeg Fury)	Goalkeeper
(Canada) Peter Sarantopoulos (Winnipeg Fury)	Defender
(Canada) Nick Dasovic (North York Rockets)	Defender
(Canada) Dino Lopez (London Lasers)	Defender
(Canada) Carl Fletcher (Toronto Blizzard)	Defender
(Canada) Geoff Aunger (London Lasers)	Midfielder
(Canada) Dale Mitchell (Vancouver 86ers)	Midfielder
(Canada) Lyndon Hooper (Toronto Blizzard)	Midfielder
(Canada) Eddy Berdusco (North York Rockets)	Forward
(Canada) Carlo Corazzin (Winnipeg Fury)	Forward
(Canada) Paul Peschisolido (Toronto Blizzard)	Forward

Reserves

Player	Position
(Canada) Paul Dolan (Vancouver 86ers)	Goalkeeper
(Canada) Ian Carter (Winnipeg Fury)	Defender
(Canada) Patrick Diotte (Montreal Supra)	Defender
(Canada) Tony Nocita (Winnipeg Fury)	Midfielder
(Canada) Gino DiFlorio (Toronto Blizzard)	Forward

Front office

Person	Role
(Canada) Paul James (London Lasers)	Head Coach
(Canada) Barry MacLean (London Lasers)	Assistant Coach
(Canada) Hector Marinaro (Vancouver 86ers)	General Manager

== Average home attendances ==
Pos.	Team	GP	Average attendance
1	Vancouver 86ers	10	3,937
2	Montreal Supra	10	2,388
3	Winnipeg Fury	10	2,236
4	Toronto Blizzard	10	1,628
5	North York Rockets	10	1,496
6	London Lasers	10	306
League total		60	1,999

== See also ==
- 2019 Canadian Premier League season – next season of D1 soccer in Canada
