= Taylor Twellman =

American soccer player

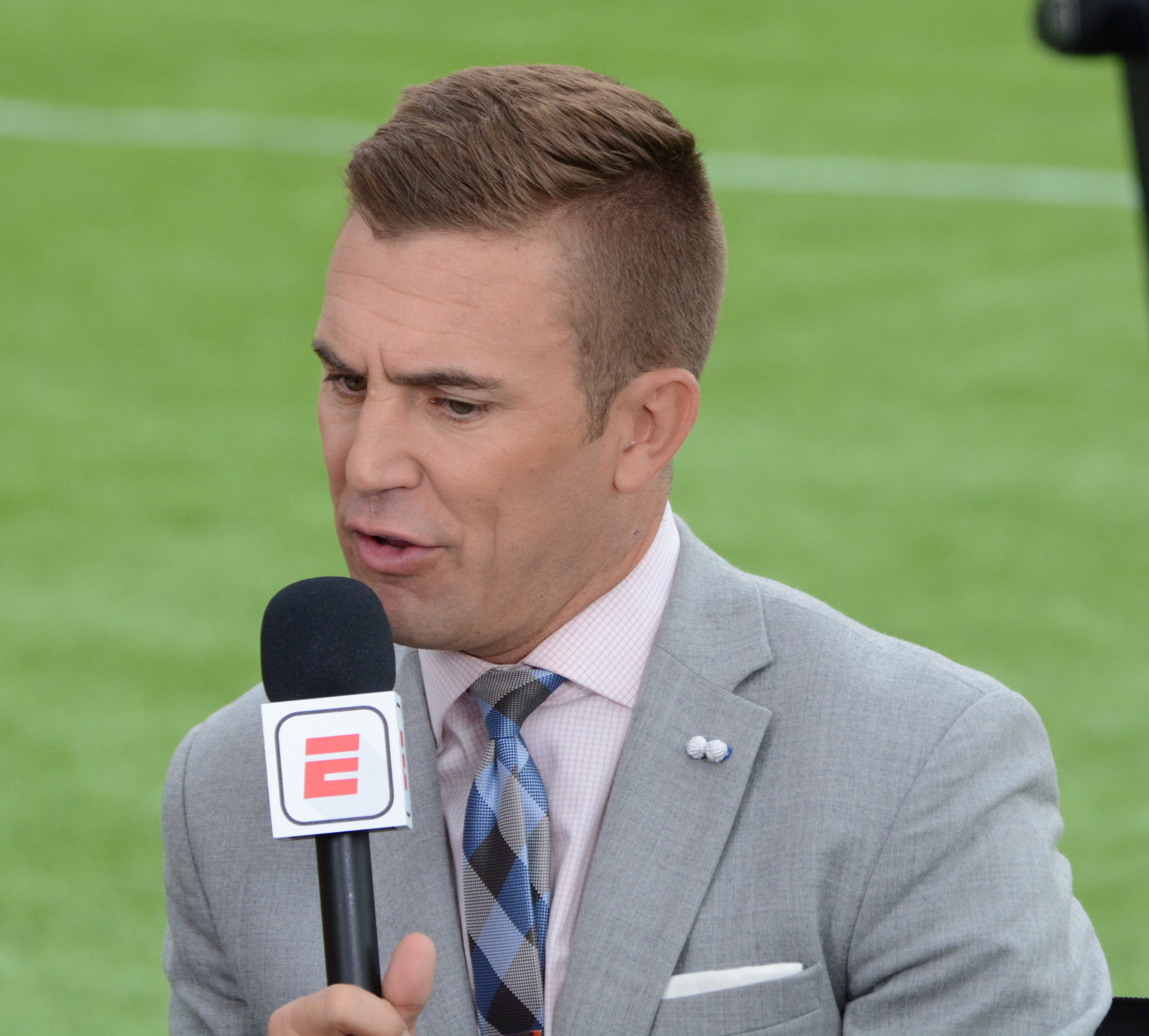
- Twellman on an ESPN show in 2019

Personal information
- Full name: Taylor Timothy Twellman
- Date of birth: February 29, 1980 (age 46)
- Place of birth: Minneapolis, Minnesota, U.S.
- Height: 5 ft 11 in (1.80 m)
- Position: Forward

College career
Years	Team	Apps	(Gls)
1998–1999	Maryland Terrapins	43	(28)

Senior career*
Years	Team	Apps	(Gls)
2000–2002	1860 Munich II	36	(7)
2002–2010	New England Revolution	174	(101)
Total		210	(108)

International career
1997	United States U17	3	(2)
1999	United States U20	4	(4)
2002–2008	United States	30	(6)
Medal record
Men's soccer
Representing United States
CONCACAF Gold Cup
Winner	2007 United States
- * Club domestic league appearances and goals

Taylor Timothy Twellman (born February 29, 1980) is an American former soccer player who played professionally from 1999 to 2010. He now works in the media as a soccer television commentator for MLS on Apple TV.

Twellman is best known for his play with the New England Revolution of Major League Soccer (MLS) from 2002 to 2009, during which time he scored more goals in MLS than any other player. He was the youngest player to score 100 goals in MLS in 2009 at the age of 29, and is New England's all-time leading goal scorer. Twellman was a five-time MLS all-star and in 2005 was the league MVP. Twellman also earned 30 caps for the United States national team, scoring 6 international goals.

Twellman has been active since his retirement in promoting awareness of concussions and working in the media as a color commentator for ESPN/ABC until 2023 and for Apple TV since 2023.

== Youth and college ==
Taylor was raised in St. Louis, Missouri, and attended Saint Louis University High School (SLUH). During his time their he received multiple honors such as being named the 1997 NSCAA National Soccer Player of the Year, 1998 Missouri High School Athlete of the Year, he was a two-time Parade and NSCAA All-American ... two-time NSCAA State Player of the Year, a two-time Gatorade State and Central Region Player of the Year. In his four years at SLUH he scored 115 goals and 35 assists, including a record school record 47 goals his junior year. He also played on the schools baseball, basketball and football teams.

After graduating from SLUH in 1998, Twellman elected to play soccer at Maryland on an athletic scholarship. At Maryland, Twellman played soccer in 1998 and 1999; in 1998 Twellman was named a second-team All American and won Soccer America's National Freshman of the Year. In his sophomore 1999 season he finished as a runner-up for both the Hermann Trophy and the MAC Player of the Year Award. After only two seasons with the Terrapins, Twellman left college to turn professional. In 43 games he scored 28 goals and 17 assists, he was also a two time NSCAA All-South Atlantic and two-time All-ACC performer.

== Professional career ==
In 2000, Twellman signed with German Bundesliga club 1860 Munich. He spent two years with the team, but played for the reserve team in Division III, and never played above the reserve level.

Twellman returned to the U.S. when he was drafted second overall by the New England Revolution in the 2002 MLS SuperDraft on February 10, 2002. He made his MLS debut in the Revolution's season opener on March 23, coming on as a 67th minute substitute for Álex Pineda Chacón in a 3-1 loss to the MetroStars. He scored his first MLS goal, and made his first MLS start, on April 20, 2002, scoring in the 10th minute of a 2-0 victory over the Columbus Crew. In Twellman's first season in MLS, he established himself as one of the best players in the league, scoring 23 goals and tallying six assists. On May 11, 2002, Twellman scored the first (and second) ever goals at Gillette Stadium in MLS league play, in the Revolution's 2-0 win over the Dallas Burn. He finished second in league MVP voting, and was named to the 2002 MLS Best XI. Twellman scored his first professional hat trick against D.C. United on September 7.

In the 2003 season, despite being beset by a number of injuries, Twellman finished tied with Carlos Ruiz of the L.A. Galaxy for top goalscorer of the league with 15. His season officially ended on October 4, vs. Dallas when he broke his left foot after scoring two goals earlier in the game. Twellman was named both New England Revolution Team MVP and Midnight Riders Man of the Year in both 2002, and 2003, making him the first player to win the honors in back to back years. His production went down in 2004, as he ended up with just nine goals.

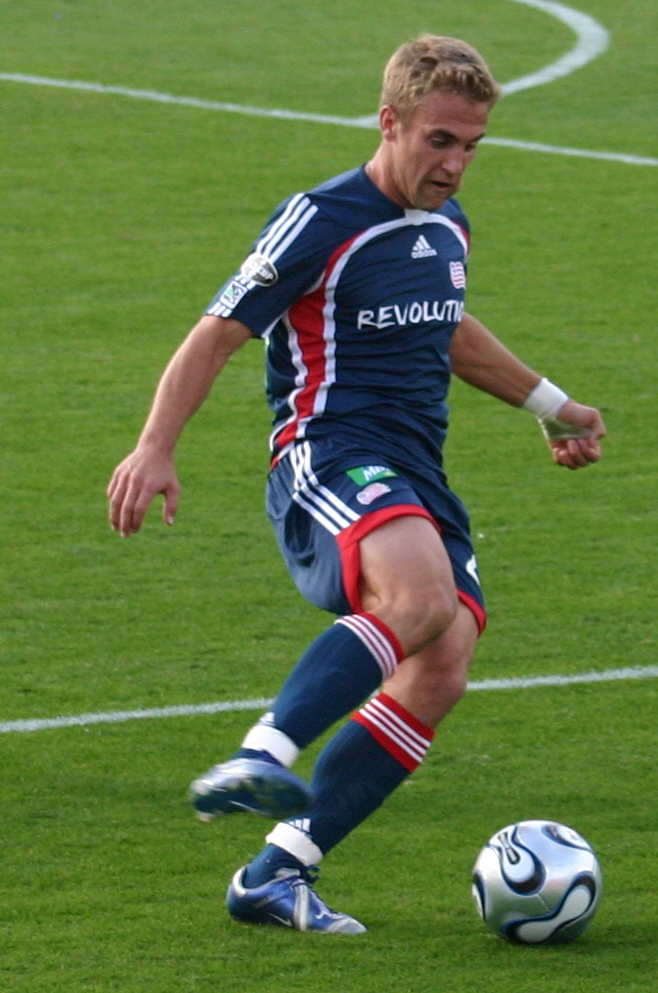
Twellman with New England Revolution in 2006

Twellman's best MLS season came in 2005, winning both the Major League Soccer MVP Award and MLS Golden Boot, and finishing the regular season with 17 goals. On April 27, vs. the Chicago Fire Twellman became the first player in Revolution history to score 50 goals as a member of the club. During the season he also scored two hat tricks the first vs. Dallas July 16, and against Columbus September 10, this set the Revolution record for career hat tricks games at 3. He was also named to the 2005 MLS Best XI and won MVP honors at that year’s All-Star game. That season Twellman led the Revolution to the 2005 MLS Cup Final vs. the Los Angeles Galaxy where they were defeated 1-0.

During the 2006 season Twellman led the Revolution in scoring four a forth time tallying 11 goals. He also scored his 75th career vs. D.C. United on October 7. During the postseason he scored game winning goal vs D.C. in the Eastern Conference Championship sending the Revolution to their second straight MLS Cup appearance. During the 2006 MLS Cup Twellman became the first ever Revolution player to score a goal in the championship game, however they would lose in penalties 4-3.

Twellman was the target of transfer talk when Odd Grenland of Norway reportedly made a $1.2 million bid for him, which MLS rejected. In February 2007, New England announced they had signed Twellman to a four-year contract, reportedly worth $5 million.

In 2007, Twellman won his first title with the Revolution: the US Open Cup in which he scored the go-ahead goal and four total goals throughout the tournament. That year he finished third in MLS in goals scored with 16. The Revolution also won the Eastern Conference title for a third straight year, with Twellman scoring a spectacular bicycle kick against the Chicago Fire to secure the Revs' spot in the 2007 MLS Cup. Twellman scored the opening goal of the 2007 MLS Cup against Houston Dynamo. However, this would be New England's only goal as they would go on to lose their third straight MLS Cup by a score of 2–1.

In January 2008, English Championship team Preston North End attempted to entice Major League Soccer and the New England Revolution to sell Twellman. Preston initially advanced an offer of $1.7 million, but MLS and the team rejected that offer, rejected another offer of $2.5 million, and then rejected another bid for $3 to $3.5 million, which would have been the fourth highest and possibly the second highest transfer fee in MLS history to date. During the 2008 MLS season Twellman finished as one of the Revolution’s leading goal scorers with eight. He boasted career lows in appearances 16, starts 12 and minutes, due to a variety of injuries he sustained throughout the year.

=== Injuries and retirement ===
Twellman suffered a neck injury and a serious concussion from a mid-air collision against Los Angeles Galaxy goalkeeper Steve Cronin on August 30, 2008. Twellman played the rest of the 2008 season, but due to lingering symptoms from his whiplash and concussion, he played only two games in 2009. One of these games vs. New York on June 7, seen him enter as a halftime substitute and score two goals in the 4-0 win those goals were the 100th and 101st of his career. Twellman had planned to make his return during the 2010 season, but he was unable to play that season and was placed on the season-ending injury list. After struggling to find any playing time over the past three seasons in MLS due to his head injury, Twellman announced his retirement from the game at the end of the 2010 MLS season.

== International career ==
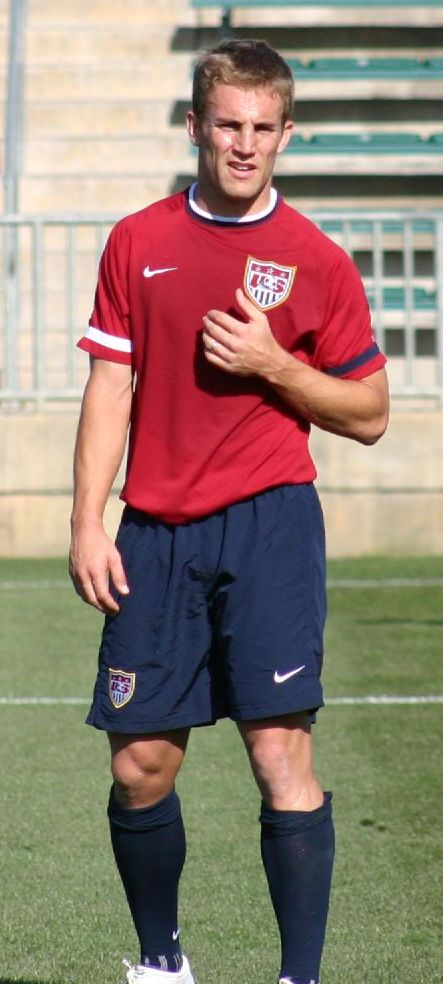
Twellman at a U.S. national team practice in 2006

Due to having an American father and a mother of Algerian descent, Twellman was eligible to represent the United States men's national soccer team as well as the Algerian national football team.

Twellman began his involvement with the U.S. national program at youth level with the U-17 and U-20 squads. He first gained professional attention after scoring four goals for the U-20 national team at the 1999 World Youth Championship while still playing with the University of Maryland. He also represented the United States at the 1999 Pan American Games.

After establishing himself in MLS, Twellman made his first appearance with the senior U.S. national team on November 17, 2002, against El Salvador. He struggled to score his first international goal, having several apparent goals waved off for offside infractions. He finally scored against Panama in a World Cup qualifier on October 12, 2005. He improved his chances for a spot on the 2006 World Cup team in a friendly against Norway on January 29, 2006. In the game, he scored the ninth hat trick in U.S. national team history, but was ultimately left off the World Cup roster by coach Bruce Arena.

Twellman was selected by new U.S. coach Bob Bradley as a member of the U.S. squad for the 2007 CONCACAF Gold Cup, scoring in a group stage win over El Salvador. Twellman gradually fell out of the national team pool in the following years after a series of concussions sidelined his club career.

== Post-retirement ==
Twellman in 2025

Since retirement, Twellman has created the THINKTaylor foundation, a charitable organization regarding sports-related concussions. Twellman has agreed to donate his brain to science after death. His brain could be of use to determine whether multiple concussions cause permanent harm to the brain.

Twellman Soccer provides programs and tools for players, coaches and organizations across the United States.

Following retirement Twellman has become an avid golfer, in 2026 he competed in the American Century Championship where he finished 8th out 89 competitors.

=== Media career ===
Twellman has had an active media career after retiring as a player. He joined ESPN/ABC from November 2011 until January 2023 as a soccer analyst, serving as lead color commentator for their Major League Soccer coverage alongside lead play-by-play commentator Adrian Healey and later Jon Champion. He also hosted a weekly recap show about the league, MLS Rewind, on ESPN+. Twellman called the 2012, 2016, and 2020 European Championships, and in 2014 Twellman was the USMNT lead color commentator in the World Cup in Brazil. He left the network in January 2023 to join Apple's MLS coverage. He also hosts his own podcast Offside With Taylor Twellman.

== Personal life ==
Taylor's father Tim Twellman, and uncles Mike Twellman and Steve Twellman, all played professionally in the North American Soccer League. Taylor's brother James Twellman played with the San Jose Earthquakes reserves in 2002. Taylor's grandfather, Jim Delsing, was a Major League Baseball outfielder in the 1950s for five teams. His uncle is golfer Jay Delsing.

Taylor married his high school sweetheart Lindsey in 2003, the two later divorced in 2008, due to "irretrievable breakdown" of their marriage.

== Career statistics ==
=== MLS ===
Club	Season	League			Open Cup		North America		Total	
Club	Season	Division	Apps	Goals	Apps	Goals	Apps	Goals	Apps	Goals
New England Revolution	2002	Major League Soccer	28	23	–		–		28	23
New England Revolution	2003	Major League Soccer	22	15	1	1	2	1	25	17
New England Revolution	2004	Major League Soccer	23	9	1	0	–		24	9
New England Revolution	2005	Major League Soccer	25	17	1	0	–		26	17
New England Revolution	2006	Major League Soccer	32	11	2	1	2	0	36	12
New England Revolution	2007	Major League Soccer	26	16	4	4	–		30	20
New England Revolution	2008	Major League Soccer	16	8	2	1	1	0	19	9
New England Revolution	2009	Major League Soccer	2	2	–		–		2	2
Career total			174	101	11	7	5	1	190	109

=== International ===
Appearances and goals by national team and year
National team	Year	Apps	Goals
United States	2002	1	0
United States	2003	5	0
United States	2004	2	0
United States	2005	5	1
United States	2006	6	4
United States	2007	10	1
United States	2008	1	0
Total		30	6

Scores and results list the United States' goal tally first, score column indicates score after each Twellman goal.

List of international goals scored by Taylor Twellman
No.	Date	Venue	Opponent	Score	Result	Competition	Ref.
1	October 12, 2005	Gillette Stadium, Foxborough, United States of America	Panama	2-0	2-0	2006 FIFA World Cup qualification	
2	January 29, 2006	Dignity Health Sports Park, Carson, United States of America	Norway	1-0	5-0	Friendly	
3	January 29, 2006	Dignity Health Sports Park, Carson, United States of America	Norway	2-0	5-0	Friendly	
4	January 29, 2006	Dignity Health Sports Park, Carson, United States of America	Norway	4-0	5-0	Friendly	
5	February 10, 2006	AT&T Park, San Francisco, United States of America	Japan	3-0	3-2	Friendly	
6	June 12, 2007	Gillette Stadium, Foxborough, United States of America	El Salvador	3-0	4-0	2007 CONCACAF Gold Cup	

== Honors ==
New England Revolution

- U.S. Open Cup: 2007
- North American SuperLiga: 2008

United States

- CONCACAF Gold Cup: 2007

Individual

- Major League Soccer MVP: 2005
- MLS Golden Boot (2): 2002, 2005
- Midnight Riders Man of the Year: 2002, 2003, 2005, 2007
- New England Revolution Team MVP: 2002, 2003, 2007
- MLS Best XI: 2002, 2005
- MLS Player of the Month: May 2002, September 2005
- MLS 100 goals club
- MLS All-Star: 2002, 2003, 2005
- MLS All-Star Game MVP: 2005
- New England Revolution All-Time Team: (2020)
- University of Maryland Athletics Hall of Fame (2022)
- Missouri Sports Hall of Fame (2024)
- In 2004, Twellman received the inaugural Keough Award, which recognizes the outstanding male soccer player from the St. Louis area.
- In 2021 Twellman received the Soccer Legacy award from The Sports Museum at TD Garden.
