= Gesualdo =

Gesualdo may refer to:

- Gesualdo, Campania, a town in Italy

== Given name ==
- Gesualdo Bufalino (1920–1996), Italian writer
- Gesualdo Francesco Ferri (1728–1788), Italian painter
- Gesualdo Lanza (1779–1859), Italian teacher of music who made his career in London
- Gesualdo Piacenti (born 1954), Italian professional football player

== Surname ==
- Alfonso Gesualdo (1540–1603), Italian cardinal
- Ascanio Gesualdo (died 1638), Italian archbishop
- Carlo Gesualdo (1566–1613), Italian late Renaissance composer
  - Gesualdo: Death for Five Voices, a film about the composer
  - Gesualdo, opera by Alfred Schnittke
  - Gesualdo, opera by Bo Holten
- Eddy Gesualdo (born 1968), Canadian professional football player
- Scipione Gesualdo (died 1608), Italian archbishop

== See also ==
- The Gesualdo Six, British vocal group
