= Tyma =

Tyma (Polish pronunciation: ['tɨ.ma]) may refer to:

- John Tyma (born 1958), American football player
- Karina Tyma (born 2000), Polish squash player
- Tim Tyma (born 1960), American football player
