= Eddie Firmani =

Footballer (born 1933)

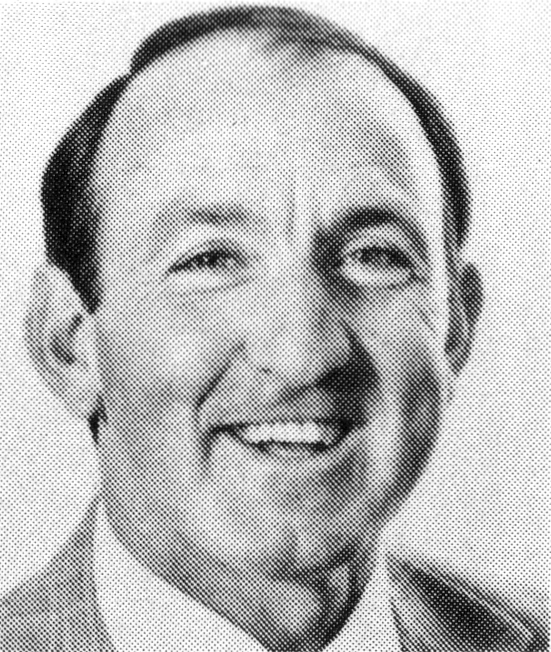
- Firmani circa 1984

Personal information
- Full name: Edwin Ronald Firmani
- Date of birth: 7 August 1933 (age 93)
- Place of birth: Cape Town, South Africa
- Position: Striker

Youth career
- 1949–1950: Clyde F.C. (Cape Town)

Senior career*
Years	Team	Apps	(Gls)
1950–1955	Charlton Athletic	100	(50)
1955–1958	Sampdoria	63	(52)
1958–1961	Inter Milan	82	(38)
1961–1963	Genoa	62	(25)
1963–1965	Charlton Athletic	55	(32)
1965–1967	Southend United	55	(24)
1967–1968	Charlton Athletic	10	(6)
1975	Tampa Bay Rowdies	1	(0)
Total		440	(238)

International career
1956–1958	Italy	3	(2)

Managerial career
- 1967–1970: Charlton Athletic
- 1975–1977: Tampa Bay Rowdies
- 1977–1979: New York Cosmos
- 1980: Philadelphia Fury
- 1981–1982: Montreal Manic
- 1983: Inter-Montréal
- 1984: New York Cosmos
- 1985–1990: Kazma SC
- 1990: Al-Talaba
- 1991: Montreal Supra
- 1992–1993: Sur FC
- 1993: Montreal Impact
- 1996: New York/New Jersey MetroStars
- * Club domestic league appearances and goals

Edwin Ronald Firmani (Italian pronunciation: [ˈɛddi firˈmaːni]; born 7 August 1933) is a former professional football player and manager. A former forward, he spent most of his playing career in Italy and England. He managed 13 different clubs over 29 years, mostly in the United States, Canada, and the Middle East. Born in South Africa, he represented the Italy national team internationally.

== Playing career ==
Firmani played as a centre or inside forward. He joined English team Charlton Athletic in 1950 and became a regular goal scorer, including scoring five goals in a 6–1 win against Aston Villa in 1955. At the time the Charlton team included several South Africans, John Hewie, Stuart Leary and Sid O'Linn. During his first spell with Charlton he married Pat Robinson, daughter of the club's assistant manager. Later in 1955 he moved to Italian team Sampdoria for £35,000, which at the time was a record transfer fee involving a British club, beginning an eight-year spell in Italy when he gained three caps for the Italy national team, qualifying for the national team because his grandfather was Italian. He also played for Inter Milan and Genoa.

While playing in Italy, he was given a nickname which was later modified twice. He was originally called Il Tacchino (The Turkey) because he flapped his elbows when he ran. It was first changed to Il Tacchino Freddo (The Cold Turkey) for the phlegmatic way he celebrated his goals, before he was finally known as Il Tacchino d'Oro (The Golden Turkey) when he began scoring with greater frequency.

In 1960 Firmani wrote a volume of autobiography "Football with the Millionaires", which provides an interesting contrast between the lifestyle of Italian footballers and their English counterparts in the era of the maximum wage.

He returned to England in 1963, linking up again with Charlton, now playing in the second division. After two years he moved to Southend United in the third division but returned to The Valley for a third spell with Charlton two seasons later. In total, he made 177 appearances for the Addicks, scoring 89 goals. In recognition of his talents, he was named as Charlton's greatest overseas player in 2005. Firmani is the only man ever to have scored 100 League goals in both England and Italy, albeit only 50 in the English first division. In 1975, he played one game for the Tampa Bay Rowdies of the North American Soccer League.

== Managerial career ==
=== Charlton Athletic ===
In 1967 Firmani was appointed Charlton manager and retired as a player. Firmani thus became the first Italian international to manage an English club. In his second season in charge, Charlton finished third in the Second Division just missing out on promotion. He was fired in March 1970 with the Addicks battling against relegation to the Third Division.

=== North America ===
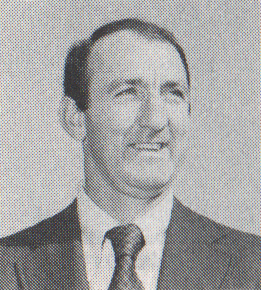
Firmani circa 1975

Firmani moved to North America and managed several North American Soccer League sides: Tampa Bay Rowdies, New York Cosmos and Philadelphia Fury which turned into Montreal Manic. He managed the Rowdies to the NASL championship in 1975 in his first year in charge and was named the NASL coach of the year in 1976, when he guided Tampa Bay to the best regular season record. He also led the Rowdies to the finals of the NASL's indoor tournament in both 1975 and 1976, winning the latter. He was the first of only three coaches (Ron Newman and Al Miller) to win both an outdoor and indoor title in the NASL.

In 1977 Firmani was signed by the Cosmos mid-season, after having resigned from the Rowdies for personal reasons. At the time the Cosmos had a team featuring Pelé, Franz Beckenbauer, Giorgio Chinaglia et al. Firmani added Carlos Alberto, Brazil's World Cup-winning captain of 1970, and the Cosmos won back-to-back titles in 1977 and 1978. For the second time in three years his squad had the best record at the end of the 1978 season. After being fired by the Cosmos in June 1979, he was quickly hired to coach the New Jersey Americans of the American Soccer League. The following season, he returned to coach in the NASL as coach of the Fury.

He later managed Canadian sides FC Inter-Montréal of the Canadian Professional Soccer League in 1983 and Montreal Impact in 1993 of the American Professional Soccer League and lastly the Major League Soccer side New York/New Jersey MetroStars in 1996.

=== The Middle East ===
Firmani coached in the Middle East during the mid-to-late 1980s, and in the early 1990s. He worked as a manager in both Kuwait and later in Oman. He mentioned in an interview how he and his wife had "liked it in Oman", and then described how he had led Sur to the first division for the first time in the club's history. After Sur was promoted to first division, Mohammed Bahwan, son of famous Omani car-dealership owner, Saud Bahwan, gave Firmani and members of the club large bonuses.

He was also held captive during the First Gulf War, but was released unharmed.

== Career statistics ==
Appearances and goals by national team and year
National team	Year	Apps	Goals
Italy	1956	1	1
Italy	1957	1	0
Italy	1958	1	1
Total		3	2

Scores and results list Italy's goal tally first, score column indicates score after each Firmani goal.

List of international goals scored by Eddie Firmani
No.	Date	Venue	Opponent	Score	Result	Competition
1	11 November 1956	Wankdorfstadion, Bern	Switzerland	1–1	1–1	1956 Dr. Gerö Cup
2	23 March 1958	Praterstadion, Vienna	Austria	2–1	2–3	1958 Dr. Gerö Cup
