= Bobby Vosmaer =

Dutch footballer

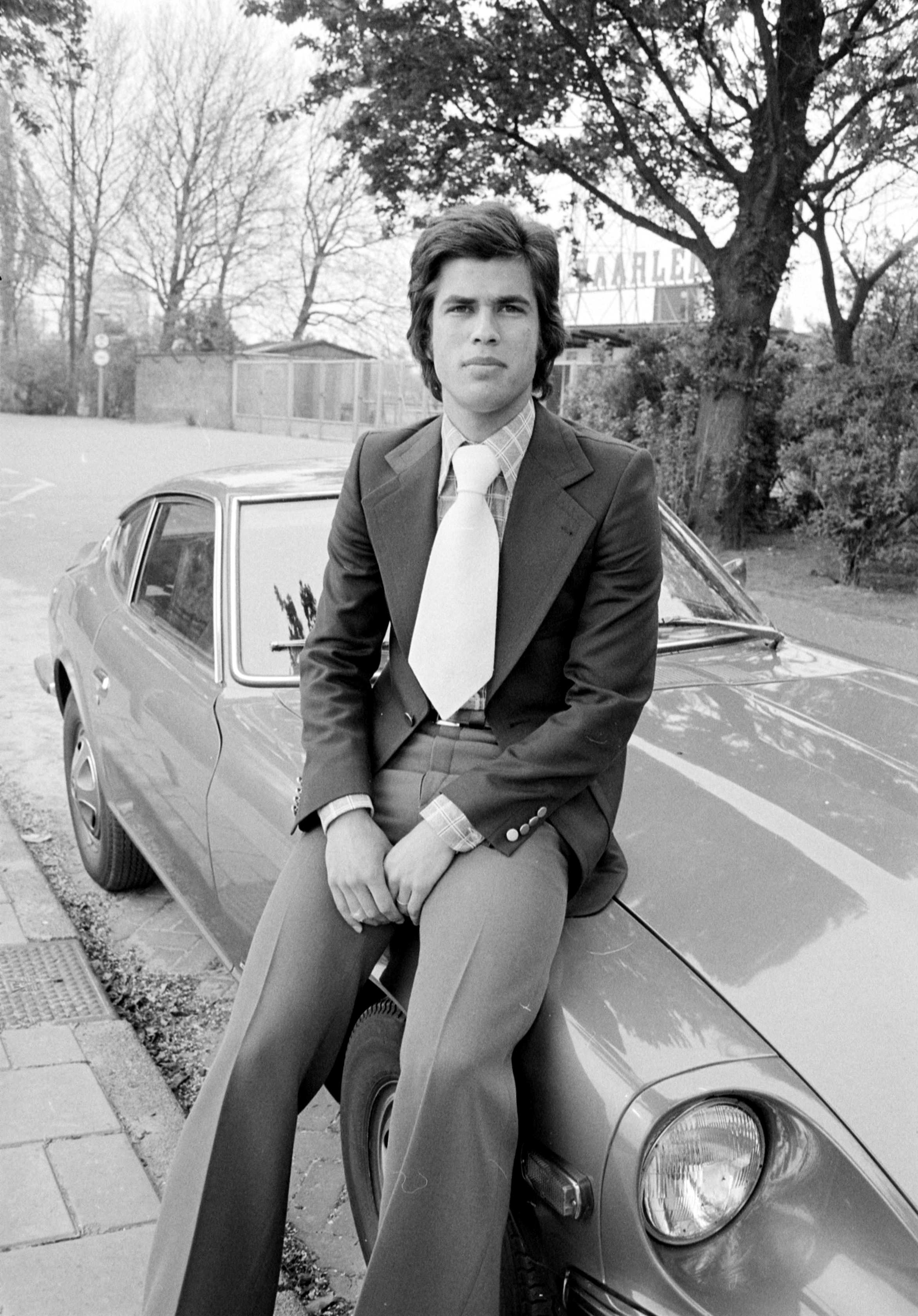
- Vosmaer in 1974

Personal information
- Full name: Robert Vosmaer
- Date of birth: July 17, 1951 (age 75)
- Place of birth: Surabaya, Indonesia
- Height: 1.80 m (5 ft 11 in)
- Position: Forward

Senior career*
Years	Team	Apps	(Gls)
1969–1972	VUC Den Haag		
1972–1974	HFC Haarlem	54	(10)
1974–1978	AZ '67	51	(12)
1977–1978	→ MVV Maastricht (loan)	25	(7)
1979–1980	VV Eijsden		
1980	Philadelphia Fury	23	(7)
1981–1982	Montreal Manic	44	(3)
1981–1982	Montreal Manic (indoor)	16	(1)
1982–1983	Chicago Sting (indoor)	42	(10)
1983	FC Inter-Montréal		
1983–1985	Pittsburgh Spirit (indoor)	67	(17)
1984	Charlotte Gold		
1985–1987	Chicago Sting (indoor)	31	(21)
1987	Canton Invaders (indoor)	7	(2)
1987–1989	Milwaukee Wave (indoor)	18	(2)

International career
1971	Netherlands Olympic		
1972	Netherlands U21		
1975	Netherlands	2	(0)

Managerial career
- 1992: Montreal Supra
- * Club domestic league appearances and goals

Robert Vosmaer (born 17 July 1951) is a former Dutch footballer who played as a forward and represented the Netherlands national football team.

== Early life ==
Vosmaer was born in 1951 in Indonesia, as his father was in the Royal Netherlands Navy, and moved to the Netherlands in 1954, at the age of 3. He grew up playing "street soccer" with his friends and later competed for regional and national Dutch amateur teams.

== Playing career ==
Vosmaer began his career in the Netherlands, playing with amateur club VUC Den Haag from 1969 to 1972. During this time, he was called up to the national Olympic team to play qualifying matches for the 1972 Summer Olympics.

In 1972, Vosmaer joined brought to HFC Haarlem in the Eredivise, where he played for coach Joop Brand. He was named MVP in his rookie season in the Eredivisie. In his time with Haarlem, he was called up to the Dutch U21 team.

In 1974, Vosmaer followed coach Brand to AZ '67. His first season in Alkmaar was very successful, scoring ten goals in 31 league games and earning a call-up to the Netherlands national team in April 1975. He made his national team debut on 30 April 1975 against Belgium, as a substitute for Kees Kist. A month later, he made his first national team start in a friendly match against Yugoslavia.

He then struggled with injuries, eventually getting loaned to MVV Maastricht in 1977, in the Eerste Divisie, where he helped then to a second-place finish and earning promotion.

After tearing his Achilles tendon in 1978, he tore it in his first game back a year later, which marked the end of his European career and he moved to a lower division team, VV Eijsden.

In 1980, he went to North America, joining the Philadelphia Fury. He continued to play in North America for the next decade, playing both indoor and outdoor football for Montreal Manic, Chicago Sting, FC Inter-Montréal, Pittsburgh Spirit, Charlotte Gold, Canton Invaders, and Milwaukee Wave.

== Managerial career ==
After a 17-year professional career, he became the general manager of the Milwaukee Wave. In 1992, he became the coach of Montreal Supra in the Canadian Soccer League, guiding them to the semi-finals in the playoffs.

In 1994, he founded North Stars FC, in Cranberry Township, Pennsylvania, near Pittsburgh, where he serves as president.

In 2005, he became the boys varsity head coach at North Allegheny High School for 15 years, where he won the WPIAL Championship twice in 2016 and 2017. In 2016, he was named WPIAL Class AAAA Coach of the Year. Coach Vosmaer resigned from the varsity head coaching position on January 27, 2022 for undisclosed reasons.

He holds the USSF "A" license as well as the Dutch coaching badge.
