= Drew Fischer =

Canadian soccer referee

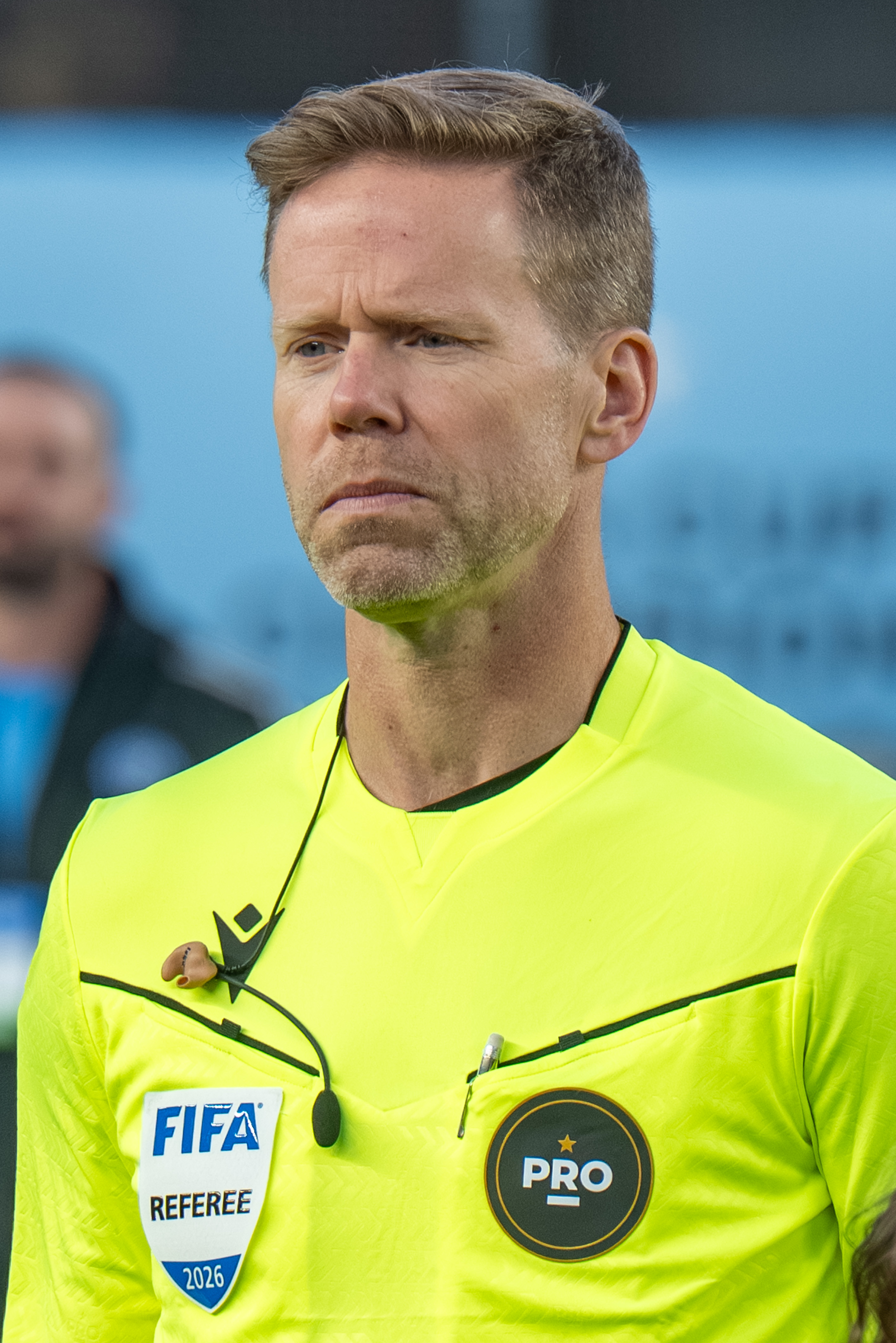
- Fischer in 2026
- Born: July 10, 1980 (age 46); Calgary, Alberta, Canada

Domestic
Years	League	Role
2012–	Major League Soccer	Referee
2019–	Canadian Premier League	Referee

International
Years	League	Role
2015–	FIFA listed	Referee
2021–	FIFA listed	Video Assistant Referee

Drew Fischer (born July 10, 1980) is a Canadian soccer referee who officiates in Major League Soccer and was approved for international matches by FIFA in 2015.

== Background ==
Fischer was born and raised in Calgary, Alberta. As a teen in Calgary he began officiating to earn extra money. Fischer has been a professional referee since 2007. He was accredited to first-division games in North America in 2012 and has been FIFA referee since 2015, only one of three Canadians at the time. He has a degree in physics from the University of Calgary.

== Refereeing career ==
=== Domestic ===
Fischer has officiated several Canadian Championship matches since 2012. He officiated the finals of the Canadian Championship in 2013, 2016, 2018, 2019, and 2025. In 2019, the Canadian Premier League began play and Fischer was one of the referees appointed during the inaugural season.

Fisher has been an active referee in Major League Soccer since 2012. He was the referee for the MLS Cup in 2025, and a VAR in 2020 and 2022. He was named the MLS Referee of the Year Award in 2024 and 2025.

=== International ===
After obtaining FIFA status in 2015, Fischer was appointed to referee the 2015 CONCACAF Men's Under-17 Championship and the 2015 CONCACAF Men's Olympic Qualifying Championship. Fischer refereed his first CONCACAF Gold Cup in 2017 and has also officiated the tournament in 2021 and 2023. He was also appointed to be a Video Assistant Referee for the 2019 FIFA Women's World Cup in France. He was selected for the Club World Cup in 2020, 2021, and 2025. He was assigned as a video match official to the 2022 FIFA World Cup in Qatar. Fischer was a referee at the 2024 Olympic Games, then was selected to the 2026 FIFA World Cup.

=== 2026 FIFA World Cup ===
Drew Fischer was selected for the 2026 FIFA World Cup in North America. Fischer and his assistants Lyes Arfa and Michael Barwegen became the first all-Canadian referee crew to officiate a men's World Cup.

In the group stage, Fischer took charge of the match between France and Iraq. He also was the referee for Ghana and Croatia. Fischer was then appointed to a round of 32 knockout match between Cape Verde and Argentina. According to the FIFA rankings, Cape Verde was ranked 64th and Argentina was ranking 2nd. However, the match went to extra time and Argentina escaped with a 3-2 win. Fischer was criticized for holding the taking of a corner kick to allow Argentina's Nicolas Tagliafico to receive treatment and change his shirt. Despite the criticism, Fischer was appointed as the 4th official for the quarterfinal between Argentina and Switzerland.

High-profile tournaments and matches
Competition	Year(s)
Canadian Interuniversity Sport National Final	2011, 2013
Amway Canadian Championship Final	2012, 2013
CONCACAF Men's U17 Championship	2015
CONCACAF Gold Cup	2017
FIFA Men's World Cup Qualifying	2018
FIFA Men's U17 World Cup, Brazil	2019
FIFA Women's World Cup, France [VAR]	2019
FIFA Club World Cup, Qatar	2020
MLS Cup Final [VAR]	2020
Concacaf Nations League Final [VAR]	2021
FIFA Club World Cup, UAE [VAR]	2021
CONCACAF Gold Cup Final [VAR]	2021
FIFA Men's World Cup Qualifying	2022
FIFA World Cup, Qatar [VAR]	2022
CONCACAF League Final (1st Leg)	2022
MLS Cup Final [VAR]	2022
CONCACAF Gold Cup	2023
Olympic Games	2024
FIFA Club World Cup	2025
MLS Cup Final	2025
FIFA World Cup, North America	2026

== Honours ==
- MLS Referee of the Year Award: 2024, 2025
- Ray Morgan Memorial Award: 2022, 2023
