= Winnipeg Fury =

Soccer team in Manitoba, Canada 1987 to 1992

- Full name: The Winnipeg Fury Soccer Club
- Nickname: The Fury
- Founded: 1987
- Dissolved: 1993
- Stadium: University Stadium (Univ of Manitoba); Winnipeg Stadium
- Capacity: University Stadium – 5,000; Winnipeg Stadium – 32,946
- Owner: Ralph Cantafio
- League: CSL (1987–1992); CNSL (1993)

The Winnipeg Fury were a professional soccer team in Winnipeg, Canada. The team was part of the Canadian Soccer League from 1987 to 1992. They were one of four teams to participate in every season of the CSL. In 1993, they played in the Canadian National Soccer League.

== History ==
The Fury were founded by Ralph Cantafio, who served as team president and chairman of the board. The club served as the first iteration of professional soccer in the province of Manitoba.

Debuting in the inaugural 1987 CSL season, the Fury struggled winning only five of their twenty games, finishing last in their division. They improved in their second season, qualifying for the playoffs, defeating Calgary in the first round, before falling to eventual champions Vancouver.

After some up and down years, the Fury won the CSL Championship in 1992, defeating the four-time defending champion Vancouver 86ers over the two-game series, by a 3–1 aggregate score (2–0 in the first leg in Vancouver, followed by a 1–1 draw at home, Prior to the win in the first leg, the club had lost every match they had played in Vancouver. They won the title despite having started the 1992 season poorly, where they were sitting in last place with a record of 3–1–10 with only three weeks remaining in the regular season, before winning 5 of their final 6 league matches to qualify for the playoffs. The league folded following the season, resulting in the team being the league's final champions of the Mita Cup. The 1992 Fury team was inducted into the Manitoba Hall of Fame in 2008, donating the Mita Cup trophy to the Hall.

Following the folding of the CSL after the 1992 season, the Fury joined the Canadian National Soccer League for the 1993 season, although much of their roster from the previous season had departed the club. The club disbanded following the season, marking the end of professional soccer in Winnipeg for 26 years. The Fury were one of only four teams to participate in every season of the CSL.

Soccer returned to Winnipeg in 2011, with WSA Winnipeg joining the pre-professional Professional Development League (PDL). Professional soccer returned to the city in 2019, with Valour FC joining the new Canadian Premier League. In 2024, Valour paid homage to the Fury, unveiling their primary kit (The Fury Kit) which featured the two maroon stripes from the Fury jersey.

== Seasons ==
Season	Tier	League	Record	Rank	Playoffs	Ref
1987	1	Canadian Soccer League	5–4–11	4th, West	Did not qualify	
1988	1	Canadian Soccer League	9–7–12	2nd, West	Semi-Finals	
1989	1	Canadian Soccer League	6–7–13	4th, West	Did not qualify	
1990	1	Canadian Soccer League	7–8–11	4th, East	Did not qualify	
1991	1	Canadian Soccer League	4–6–18	8th	Did not qualify	
1992	1	Canadian Soccer League	8–1–11	3rd	Champions	
1993	2	Canadian National Soccer League	4–1–11	9th, West	Did not qualify	

== Notable players ==
- (Sweden) Tomas Antonelius
- (Canada) Geoff Aunger
- (Canada) Nico Berg
- (Canada) Garrett Caldwell
- (Canada) Jeff Cambridge
- (Canada) Ian Carter
- (Canada) Carlo Corazzin
- (Canada) Mike Dodd
- (Canada) Paul Fenwick
- (Canada) Eddy Gesualdo
- (Canada) Nick Gilbert
- (Canada) Kevin Holness
- (Canada) John Hughes
- (Romania) Constantin Ignat
- (Canada) Keith Izatt
- (England) (Canada) Simon Keith
- (Canada) Shaun Lowther
- (Iran) (Canada) Peyvand Mossavat
- (Canada) Tony Nocita
- (Canada) David Norman
- (Canada) Giuliano Oliviero
- (Canada) Pat Onstad
- (England) Lawrie Pearson
- (Canada) Bryan Rosenfeld
- (Canada) Peter Sarantopoulos
- (Sweden) Mark Shail
- (Canada) Niall Thompson
- (Canada) Troy Westwood (draft pick, never played)
