= Frederick Stambrook =

28th President of the Canadian Soccer Association
- In office 1986–1991
- Preceded by: Jim Fleming
- Succeeded by: Terry Quinn

Personal details
- Born: November 16, 1929 Vienna, Austria
- Died: July 15, 2005 (aged 75) Winnipeg, Manitoba, Canada
- Occupation: sports official

Frederick George Stambrook (November 16, 1929 – July 15, 2005) was a president of the Manitoba Soccer Association and the Canadian Soccer Association.

He moved to England as a refugee from Austria at the age of nine where he lived and studied, achieving a B.A. Honours from Oxford University and a PhD from the University of London. Later he moved to Australia and then to Winnipeg, where he became involved in his son's soccer program at the Crescentwood Community Centre, leading to his founding of the Manitoba Minor Soccer Association. He moved on to become president of the Canadian Youth Soccer Association and in 1980 president of the Manitoba Soccer Association. In 1986, he became the 27th president of the Canadian Soccer Association and during his six years in this post contributed to the game in Canada and abroad.

He was the Host-President of the FIFA U-17 World Tournament in Toronto in 1987, an active proponent of women's soccer and helped found the national women's team. He served on the FIFA Appeals Committee at the Los Angeles Olympics and the 1994 World Cup.

He was made a Life Member of the CSA, and was inducted into the Manitoba Jewish Sports Hall of Fame and the Manitoba Sports Hall of Fame. He gave over three decades of service to soccer and at the same time, to his University, where he was a popular professor of history.

He died on July 15, 2005, and in April 2006 he was inducted as a Builder into the Canadian Soccer Hall of Fame.

== Honours ==
- Aubrey Sanford Meritorious Service Award: 1993
