= FC Inter-Montréal =

Canadian professional soccer team

- Full name: Football Club Inter-Montréal
- Founded: 1983
- Dissolved: 1983
- Stadium: Jarry Park Stadium
- Capacity: 25,000
- Owner: Bob Laker
- Coach: Eddie Firmani
- League: Canadian Professional Soccer League

FC Inter-Montréal was a Canadian professional soccer team in Montreal, Quebec that competed in the original Canadian Professional Soccer League in 1983.

== History ==
On December 7, 1982, the Canadian Professional Soccer League announced their initial five ownership groups, of which one was to be headed by Bob Laker in Montreal.

On February 7, 1983, the Montreal Manic of the North American Soccer League had decided to transform themselves into a "Team Canada" farm team by the 1984 season. In doing so, they began to get rid of the majority of their non-Canadian players to field a primarily Canadian lineup. This had the effect of alienating their primarily Italian fanbase, resulting in attendance dropping 66%.

FC Inter-Montreal (the name Inter-Pro was initially considered) was officially established the day after the Manic's announcement, when the CPSL was officially launched, and team president Bob Laker had hopes to make the club the model franchise for the league. He immediately set out on high-profile acquisitions, with the team having a reported $1.2 million budget, hiring former New York Cosmos and Montreal Manic coach Eddie Firmani and signing former Manic star players Gordon Hill and Bobby Vosmaer. The club also reached a local sponsorship deal with the Labatt Brewing Company.

They played their first match against the Toronto Nationals on May 21, losing by a score of 2–1. Their home opener took place at Jarry Park Stadium on June 5, 1983, against the Hamilton Steelers with Laker claiming an attendance of 12,412, which would have been larger than any Manic crowd that season. After the match, Montreal management denied a report that they handed out 5,000 free tickets to the match to boost attendance. However, ten days later, a match against Hamilton drew only 981 spectators, but most matches had around 5000-6000 people.

Bob Laker organized a tournament featuring high-profile European clubs – French club Marseille and Italian clubs Udinese and Avellino. In their first match they managed to defeat Marseille 2–0 on June 13, advancing to the final a week later where they defeated Udinese in a penalty shootout following a 1–1 score after regulation on June 19, with British striker Gordon Hill scoring all of the team's goals in the tournament.

However, just a week after their match against Udinese, and after only five weeks of play and eight league matches, Inter-Montreal folded midway through the season, due to heavy financial losses and being unable to pay their players and partially as a result of the money spent on the international exhibition tournament. The Manic also folded at the end of 1983, leaving Montreal with no professional teams until 1988, when Montreal Supra was formed to play in the new Canadian Soccer League. Attendance for these matches was approximately 12,000, boosted by the large Italian-Canadian population in Montreal.

== Season ==
Season	Tier	League	Record	Rank	Playoffs	Ref
1983 (Note: Inter-Montreal folded prior to the conclusion of the season.)	1	Canadian Professional Soccer League	5–1–2	3rd	–	

== Notable players ==
- (Serbia) Radojko Avramović
- (England) Gordon Hill
- (Canada) Tasso Koutsoukos
- (Italy) (Canada) Gerry Morielli
- (Greece) Takis Nikoloudis
- (Netherlands) Bobby Vosmaer
- (Italy) Giuseppe Wilson
