= Canada Soccer Awards =

The Canada Soccer Awards are presented annually at the Canada Soccer Awards Banquet at the Canadian Soccer Association's Annual Meeting of the Members in early May. There are six main Association Awards presented at the banquet alongside the annual Canada Soccer Hall of Fame (non-player) honoured member. These Association Awards may honour administrators, coaches, referees and players.

As part of the Awards Banquet, Canada Soccer also celebrates their annual Canada Soccer Player Awards and Canada Soccer Hall of Fame (Modern Canadian Players category) honoured members, but those award winners are typically announced separately and honoured at home international matches.

At the 2023 Awards Banquet, Canada Soccer honoured Atiba Hutchinson (President's Award), Francine Mérette (Aubrey Sanford Meritorious Service Award), Sylvie Béliveau (Tony Waiters Coaching Excellence Award), Drew Fischer (Ray Morgan Memorial Award), Dr. Clare Rustad (Brian Budd Award), and John Eatmon (Award of Merit).

== Canada Soccer Annual Awards ==
=== President's Award ===
The President's Award honours an individual for their outstanding and unique efforts in developing soccer in Canada. The award was first presented in 1993 (and awarded annually with the exception of 2010, 2011, 2020 and 2021).

Season	Winner
2024	(Canada) Charlie Cuzzetto
2023	(Canada) Atiba Hutchinson
2022	(Canada) Christine Sinclair
2019	(Canada) Dr. Dominic Maestracci
2018	(Canada) Norm Odinga
2017	(England) Alan Churchard
2016	(Canada) Kevin Holness
2016	(Canada) Percy Hoff
2015	(Canada) Richard Labrom
2014	(Canada) Les Sinnott
2013	(Canada) Brigitte Frot
2009	(Canada) Fred Kern
2008	(Canada) Ben Lake
2007	(Canada) Colin Jose
2006	(Canada) Dr. Rudy Gittens
2005	(Canada) Bill Hoyle
2004	(Canada) George Athanasiou
2003	(Canada) Harry Newman
2002	(Canada) Brian Avey
2001	(Canada) Gary Gentile
2000	(Canada) Jim Ellis
1999	(Canada) Dorothy Hickey
1998	(Canada) Lorraine Miller
1997	(Canada) Sam Donaghey
1996	(Canada) Mike Illich
1995	(Canada) Walter Sieber
1994	(Canada) Richard Forrester
1993	(Canada) Dave Fryatt

=== Aubrey Sanford Meritorious Service Award ===
The Aubrey Sanford Meritorious Service Award "honours an individual for their outstanding service and overall contribution in refereeing, coaching, playing or administration". The award was named in honour of the late Aubrey Sanford.

Season	Winner
2023	(Canada) Francine Mérette
2022	(Canada) Maeve Glass
2019	(Canada) Dick Howard
2018	(Canada) Bob Sawtell
2017	(Canada) Roger Barnes
2015	(Canada) Andy Sharpe
2014	(Canada) Dr. Ed Johnson
2013	(Canada) George Athanasiou
2012	(Canada) Terry Quinn
2011	(Canada) Pasquale Cifarelli
2010	(Canada) Adrian Newman
2009	(Canada) Angus Barrett
2009	(Canada) Vincent Ursini
2007	(Canada) Les Wilkinson
2006	(Canada) Lorraine Miller
2005	(Canada) Craig Forrest
2004	(Canada) Dino Madonis
2003	(Canada) Gary Sampley
2002	(Canada) Geri Donnelly
2001	(Canada) Randy Samuel
2000	(Canada) Les Wilson
1999	(Canada) Dr. Rudy Gittens
1998	(Canada) Bruce Wilson
1997	(Canada) Jim Fleming
1996	(Canada) Tony Waiters
1995	(Canada) Dino Soupliotis
1994	(Canada) Eric King
1993	(Canada) Dr. Fred Stambrook
1992	(Canada) Tony Evangelista
1991	(Canada) Sam Donaghey
1990	(Canada) Ben Lake
1989	(Canada) Dave Fryatt
1987	(Canada) Dr. Tom Fried
1986	(Canada) Bill Stirling

=== Ray Morgan Memorial Award ===
The Ray Morgan Memorial Award honours referees that show progress at the national and international levels. The award was first presented in 1980 (and awarded annually with the exception of 1988, 1993, 1997, 2000, 2003–06, 2020–21). The award was named in honour of the late Ray Morgan.

Season	Winner
2024	(Canada) Marie-Soleil Beaudoin
2023	(Canada) Drew Fischer
2022	(Canada) Drew Fischer
2019	(Canada) Joe Fletcher
2018	(Canada) Dave Gantar
2017	(Canada) Carol Anne Chénard
2016	(Canada) Suzanne Morisset
2015	(Canada) Marie-Josée Charbonneau
2014	(Canada) Marie-Soleil Beaudoin
2013	(Canada) Silviu Petrescu
2012	(Canada) Joe Fletcher
2011	(Canada) Philippe Brière
2010	(Canada) Paul Ward
2009	(Canada) Carol Anne Chénard
2008	(Canada) Denise Robinson
2007	(Canada) Hu Liu
2002	(Canada) Mauricio Navarro
2001	(Canada) William Laidlaw
1999	(Canada) Jose Farias
1998	(Canada) John Nielsen
1996	(Canada) Hector Vergara
1995	(Canada) Sonia Denoncourt
1994	(Canada) Mike Seifert
1992	(Canada) Gord Arrowsmith
1991	(Canada) Bob Sawtell
1990	(Canada) John Meachin
1989	(Canada) Ernest Foote
1987	(Canada) Derek Douglas
1986	(Canada) Robert Allen
1985	(Canada) John Meachin
1984	(Canada) Ilio Matos
1983	(Canada) Dante Maglio
1982	(Canada) Tony Evangelista
1981	(Canada) Ben Fusco
1980	(Canada) Werner Winsemann

=== Tony Waiters Coaching Excellence Award ===
The Tony Waiters Coaching Excellence Award "honours a person’s overall contributions to coaching in Canada for a minimum of 20 years". The award was first presented in 2022. The award was named in honour of the late Tony Waiters.

Season	Winner
2024	(England) Ray Clark
2023	(Canada) Sylvie Béliveau
2022	(Canada) Gary Miller

=== Brian Budd Award ===
The Brian Budd Award honours outstanding individuals "who have excelled both in soccer and in another endeavour, be it in sport or public life. The individual must exemplify good character, accomplishments, dedication and provide inspiration to present and future generations". The award was presented from 2010 to 2014 and then once again starting annually in 2022. The award was named in honour of the late Brian Budd.

Season	Winner
2024	(Canada) Shona Schleppe
2023	(Canada) Clare Rustad
2022	(Canada) Charmaine Crooks
2014	(Canada) Marc Rizzardo
2013	(Canada) Dr. Carl Shearer
2012	(Canada) Gerry Dobson
2011	(Canada) Peter Sloly
2010	(Canada) Peter Zezel

=== Canada Soccer Award of Merit ===
The Canada Soccer Award of Merit honours individuals for their efforts in the "promotion, growth and development of soccer in Canada".

Season	Winner
2024	Claudine Douville, Jean-Yves Phaneuf
2023	John Eatmon
2022	Tony Nocita
2019	Helder Duarte
2018	Michael Doyle, Vivian Hansen, Roger Vail
2016	Leslie Blyth, Percy Hoff, Jeannette Kuc, Huw Morris
2014	Don Dancey, Bob Sawtell, Leeta Sokalski
2013	Wendell MacGibbon, Cindy Tye
2011	Jean Bernier, Richard Labrom
2010	William Laidlaw, Walter McKee, Lynda McLeish
2009	Stuart Brown, Mario Charpentier, Joanne Mazurkewich, Mike Oliver, Dave Randall, Henry Szewczik, Mike Traficante
2008	Judi Kelloway, Ed Moyst, Brian Murphy, Trevor Paine, Alan Ross, Brian Walsh
2006	Mary Dunleavy, Edward Grenda, Jim Pittfield
2005	Klaas Post
2004	David Darlington, Ralph Cantafio, Alan Godfrey, Gerald MacDonald,
2003	Frank Bailey, Larry Diehl, Peter MacKenzie, Laurie McIvor, Jim Nicholson, Dino Madonis
2002	Daphne Andrews, Greg Bay, Frank Capasso, John Diamond, Marie March, Bruce Norton, Thomas Pollock, Dr. Bill Silver
2001	Tom Doyle, Esther Dupperon, Nick Filippone, Ken Fowler, Dr. Geoff Haigh, Dr. Ed Johnson, Fred Kern, Jim Lamond, Jim Spencer, Roger Stringer, Jack Taylor
2000	Dave Buckman, Stewart Duncan
1999	Victor Batel, Dave Kerr
1998	Brian Crease, Dorothy Hickey, Benjamin Millet
1997	Jeff Babstock, Newman Bartlett, the Breen family, Doug Redmond, John Stornel, Mark Sweetapple
1996	Frank Bain, Malcolm Cowie, Neil Ellett, Bert Goldberger, Deryl Hughes, Alex Scotty Kemp, Lou Moro
1995	Geneva Boucher, Pasquale Cifarelli, the Hooper family, Elio Mandrossi, Georges Schwartz
1994	Mario Perrino, Ray Veaudry
1993	Doug Knott, Tom Wallis
1992	Dr. Tom Brandl, Jim Ellis, Bill Hoyle, Colin Jose, Terry Kelly
1991	Harry Skidmore, John Straker
1990	John McCoy, Harry Newman, Les Wilkinson
1989	Walter Sieber, Bill Thomson
