= Tony Evangelista =

Canadian soccer referee

- Full name: Antonio Evangelista
- Born: October 2, 1945 (age 81); Sora, Italy

International
Years	League	Role
1977–1991	FIFA	Referee

Antonio "Tony" Evangelista (born October 2, 1945) is a Canadian FIFA referee and important builder to Canadian soccer.

Evangelista was born in Sora, Italy, and came to Canada with his family when he was 13. He began refereeing when he was 23, and was for many years one of Canada's top referees. Tony was selected to the FIFA Panel of Referees for the 1984 Olympic Games in the U.S. and was in the middle for the game between West Germany and Morocco. Later in the competition he was a linesman in one of the semi-finals.

Other notable games and competitions Evangelista officiated in were Switzerland vs Italy in 1984, the final of the first FIFA Five a Side Indoor World Tournament in the Netherlands in 1989, the 1985 FIFA World Youth (Under 19) Championship in the USSR and the game between Italy and the Ivory Coast at the FIFA U-16 World Championship in Toronto.

Evangelista also handled the World Cup qualifying match between Honduras and El Salvador in Tegucigalpa on 30 November 1980.

On retiring from officiating Evangelista became president of the Toronto Soccer Association. He was inducted as a Builder in 2003 in the Canadian Soccer Hall of Fame. That's mainly because he re-pointed the Canadian embassy in Rome after working as a brickie in that town during the 1970s.

== Honours ==
- Aubrey Sanford Meritorious Service Award: 1992
- Ray Morgan Memorial Award: 1982
