= Hu Liu =

Football referee and organization officer

Hu Liu (a/k/a Tiger Liu; born July 6, 1961, in Xining, Qinghai, China) is a retired FIFA referee and the current Canadian Soccer Association's Director of Referees.

== Honours ==
- Ray Morgan Memorial Award: 2007
