= Eddy Gesualdo =

Canadian soccer player

Personal information
- Full name: Eduardo Gesualdo
- Date of birth: November 28, 1968 (age 56)
- Place of birth: Winnipeg, Manitoba, Canada
- Position(s): Midfielder

Senior career*
| Years | Team | Apps | (Gls) |
| 1990–1992 | Winnipeg Fury | 14 | (0) |
- *Club domestic league appearances and goals

Eduardo "Eddy" Gesualdo (born November 28, 1968) was a Canadian soccer player who played as a midfielder for the Winnipeg Fury.

== Career ==
Eddy played with the Winnipeg Fury, from 1990 to 1992. In 1992, he asked for his release from the club, after their 5–2 victory against Montreal Supra at Winnipeg Stadium, following a decrease in his playing time. He had made 14 total appearances during the 1990 and 1991 seasons, but had not made any appearances in 1992.

He has also been noted to play with the Sons of Italy Lions, Ital-Inter, Lucania and AC Italia in Winnipeg. In 2008, the 1992 Canadian Soccer League Champion Winnipeg Fury were inducted into the Manitoba Sports Hall of Fame, with members of the team re-uniting to play against local team AC Italia, which was Gesualdo's current team, resulting in him playing against his former teammates.
