= Radojko Avramović =

Serbian footballer (born 1949)

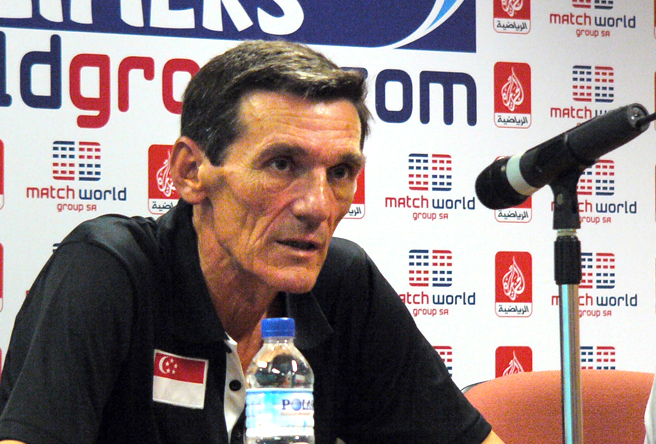
- Avramović with Singapore

Personal information
- Full name: Radojko Avramović
- Date of birth: 29 November 1949 (age 76)
- Place of birth: Sjenica, PR Serbia, FPR Yugoslavia
- Position: Goalkeeper

Senior career*
Years	Team	Apps	(Gls)
1968–1974	Borac Čačak	205	(5)
1975–1979	Rijeka	119	(0)
1979–1983	Notts County	149	(0)
1983	Inter-Montréal		
1983–1984	Coventry City	18	(0)
1984–1985	OFK Beograd	25	(0)
Total		516	(5)

International career
1978	Yugoslavia	1	(0)

Managerial career
- 1993–1998: Oman U23
- 1998: Kuwait (assistant)
- 1999–2002: Kuwait U23
- 2002: Kuwait
- 2003: Muscat Club
- 2003–2012: Singapore
- 2014–2015: Myanmar
- 2017: Al Tadhmon SC
- 2018: Kuwait (interim)
- 2019: Home United
Medal record
Men's football
Representing Singapore (as manager)
AFF Championship
Winner	2004
Winner	2007
Winner	2012
- * Club domestic league appearances and goals

Radojko "Raddy" Avramović (Serbian Cyrillic: Радојко Аврамовић; born 29 November 1949) is a Serbian former football coach and player. A goalkeeper, Avramović most notably played for Croatian club Rijeka and English club Notts County as well as internationally for Yugoslavia. During his managerial career, Avramović was most notably a long-term manager of Singapore national team, being widely regarded as the most successful coach leading Singapore. He also briefly managed Myanmar and Kuwait national teams.

Avramović discontinued his law studies two years into university to become a footballer. He began his playing career with Borac Čačak in the Yugoslav Second League in 1968. He signed for Yugoslav First League club Rijeka in 1975. As a 1977–78 Yugoslav Cup winner with Rijeka, he played in the 1978–79 Cup Winners' Cup. He won his only international cap with Yugoslavia in a Balkan Cup match against Greece on 15 November 1978. He was scouted by Notts County manager Jimmy Sirrel, who signed him for a club record £200,000 in 1979 and would later regard Avramović as one of his best players. He contributed with 16 clean sheets as the club was promoted to the First Division in 1981 in their return to the top flight after 54 years. He made a total of 167 appearances for Notts County before moving to Coventry City for the 1983–84 season. In 1984, he returned to Yugoslavia with OFK Belgrade where he played his final season, helping them to the Second League East Division title before retiring as a player at the age of 35.

Avramović was placed in charge of Oman's age group teams from 1993 to 1998. In August 1998, he was appointed as assistant coach to Kuwait, and as coach of their Olympic squad a year later. He guided the under-23 team through the Asian qualifiers to the 2000 Summer Olympics. Following the departure of Berti Vogts in February 2002, Avramović took over as national coach of Kuwait. He led the senior team to their first West Asian Games title in April, and the under-23 team to the quarter-finals of the 2002 Asian Games in October, which they lost 1–0 to eventual silver medalists Iran. His contract was however terminated in December after a poor performance at the 2002 Arab Nations Cup. He led Oman outfit Muscat Club to the 2002-03 Omani League title during a six-month stint from February 2003. In July 2003, Avramović was unveiled as coach of the Singapore national team. He led them to their first international title in the 2004 ASEAN Football Championship, completing a hat-trick of tournament wins with further triumphs in 2007 and 2012. After a decade in Singapore, Avramović stood down as national coach in December 2012. In February 2014, he was appointed as coach of the Myanmar national team; he stepped down from the position in 2015. He returned to Kuwait for brief spells with Al Tadhmon SC and the Kuwait national team in 2017 and 2018, respectively, until returning to Singapore in 2019 to manage Home United. He was forced to retire early into his term due to a serious illness.

== Club career ==
Avramović began his playing career with Yugoslav Second League club Borac Čačak in 1968 after discontinuing his law studies two years into university. As he disliked heading the ball, Avramović switched from playing in central defence to the goalkeeper position. He won the 1972–73 Second League East Division title with the club. In 1975, he signed for First League club Rijeka where he made 119 league appearances and won the 1977–78 Yugoslav Cup. As Cup winners, Rijeka qualified for the 1978–79 Cup Winners' Cup. In the first round, Rijeka defeated Welsh club Wrexham 3–2 over two legs to advance to the next round. Rijeka were drawn against Belgian outfit K.S.K. Beveren in the second round. After a goalless draw in the home leg, Rijeka conceded two goals in the return leg to exit the competition 2–0 on aggregate.

"In my opinion, the goalkeeper is the number one man in your team. You start with a point, and if he doesn't lose a goal, you get that. So if you score one, you've won."

— Notts County manager Jimmy Sirrel on Avramović.

In 1978, the Football Association lifted the restriction on foreign players in the Football League. Avramović was scouted by Notts County manager Jimmy Sirrel, who claimed he had found "a goalie who would keep them in the Second Division" and persuaded his chairman Jack Dunnet to pay a club record £200,000 for his transfer. Sirrel took Avramović under his personal care, and would later regard him as one of his best players. At the beginning of the Avramović's career at Notts County, there was a social function at which he went around and bought all his new teammates a drink as a friendly gesture. A local reporter saw this and wrote a newspaper article about Avramović being a "boozer" and a "big-time-Charlie". The next time that same reporter went to Meadow Lane, Sirrel physically caught hold of him and had him thrown off the premises and banned from the ground. The Evening Post had to give the reporter the Nottingham Forest job whilst the City Ground reporter switched over to Notts County. On 4 August 1979, Avramović played his first competitive game for the club against Mansfield Town in an Anglo-Scottish Cup qualifier. He made his league debut against Cardiff City on 18 August, with his side running out 4–1 winners. The Magpies finished 17th in the league in that season but gained promotion to the First Division by claiming the runners-up spot in the 1980–81 season, with Avramović contributing with 16 clean sheets. In the first season of the club's return to the top flight after 54 years, Avramović played in all 42 league games as they defeated Arsenal 2–1 in October and beat defending champions Aston Villa 1–0. Avramović made a total of 167 appearances in four seasons for the club.

In 1983, Avramović left for Canada to play for FC Inter-Montréal. Afterwards, Coventry City manager Bobby Gould convinced him to join them in the 1983–84 First Division. He made his debut in a 2–1 win at Highfield Road over Leicester City. He was dropped from the starting line-up after a number of goalkeeping errors. He let a clearance from Watford custodian Steve Sherwood bounce over his head into an empty net and punched a cross into his own net in a 2–3 home defeat to Stoke City a few weeks later. Gould then declared he would not pick Avramović again in the post-match interview. He returned to Yugoslavia with OFK Belgrade in 1984, winning the Yugoslav Second League East Division title in his only season with the club before retiring at the age of 35.

== International career ==
Avramović earned his only cap with the Yugoslavia national team on 15 November 1978. He played the full match as Yugoslavia defeated Greece 4–1 in the Balkan Cup.

== Coaching career ==
=== Early years ===
Avramović moved to Asia in 1991. He was placed in charge of Oman's age group teams from 1993 to 1998. In August 1998, he was appointed as assistant coach to Kuwait, and as coach of their Olympic squad a year later. He guided the Olympic squad through the Asian qualifiers to the 2000 Summer Olympics. Following the departure of Berti Vogts in February 2002, Avramović took over as national coach of Kuwait. He led the senior team to their first West Asian Games title in April, and the under-23 team to the quarter-finals of the 2002 Asian Games in October, which they lost 1–0 to eventual silver medalists Iran. His contract was however terminated when in December when hosts Kuwait failed to reach the semi-finals of the 2002 Arab Nations Cup. From February to July 2003, he coached Omani outfit Muscat Club to the 2002-03 Omani League title.

=== Singapore ===
In December 2002, Singapore failed to achieve their target of reaching the 2002 AFF Championship final. The results included a 4–0 loss to traditional rivals Malaysia at the former National Stadium and Singapore exited the competition on an inferior goal difference at the group stage. Coach Jan B. Poulsen was sacked in the aftermath and after a six-month search, Avramović was appointed as coach of Singapore's senior and under-23 teams on a two-and-a-half-year contract in July 2003. The FAS tasked him with the targets of qualifying for the 2004 AFC Asian Cup, as well as reaching the finals of the 2004 AFF Championship and 2005 Southeast Asian Games. He took charge of his first game with a 4–1 international friendly win over Hong Kong in August. The Lions started their 2004 AFC Asian Cup qualifying campaign with two defeats to Avramović's former team, Kuwait in September. They gained their first points with a win and a draw over Palestine. A 2–0 defeat to Qatar in November dashed their hopes of reaching the finals. In the post-mortem, Avramović stated his emphasis on developing more young players for the national squad.

Singapore were drawn in the same group as Japan, India and Oman for the 2006 FIFA World Cup qualification in 2004. They finished bottom of Group 3 with a win and five losses, including two narrow defeats to 2000 AFC Asian Cup winners Japan and a 7–0 trashing by Oman in Muscat on 9 June. The 2004 AFF Championship draw pitted Singapore against Indonesia, Cambodia, Laos and co-hosts Vietnam in Group A. Despite a record of four wins in eighteen matches, the FAS gave their assurance that Avramović would not be sacked even if he failed to meet the target of reaching the tournament final. Avramović 2004 AFF Championship squad included naturalised players Daniel Bennett, Agu Casmir and Itimi Dickson. Singapore drew 1–1 with Vietnam in their opening match, following it up with a 2–2 stalemate against Indonesia. A 6–2 win over Laos and a 3–0 defeat of Cambodia ensured their passage to the semi-finals as group runners-up. Singapore faced Myanmar in the semi-finals, registering a 4–3 win in the first leg in a game where first-choice striker Indra Sahdan was suspended and questions were raised over the eligibility of a Myanmar player. (Note: Myanmar's Myo Min Tun was dismissed for violent conduct in a LG Cup match against India in August 2004. The AFC had issued a six-month ban but Myo continued to play in the AFF-organised Tiger Cup which was not a competition sanctioned by the AFC.) A 4–2 extra-time win over 8-man Myanmar (Note: Myanmar striker Yan Paing was sent off for his second yellow card and Lynn Tun received a straight red for conceding a penalty. Moe Kyaw Thu was dismissed for kicking mud at the referee to reduce Myanmar to eight men.) in the home leg put the Lions through to the finals where they faced Indonesia. Singapore achieved a 3–1 win at Senayan in the first leg, followed by a 2–1 win at Kallang on 16 January 2005. Singapore clinched the trophy on home soil and their second international title after their 1998 tournament triumph. The Lions were honoured for their Cup win with the Team of the Year award at the Singapore Sports Awards 2005.

The FAS's offer of a new two-year contract in May 2005 amid interest in the service of the coach by other Middle Eastern and Asian teams was not taken up by Avramović, who lamented the lack of stronger competitive matches for the national team and little support for the players. In June, Avramović announced a shortlist of 40 players for the Southeast Asian Games in November. As part of their preparations, Singapore entered the inaugural AFF U-23 Youth Championship held in September, finishing runners-up behind Thailand. Although the under-23 squad contained nine players that won the 2004 Tiger Cup, they failed to progress beyond the group stage of the 2005 Southeast Asian Games. Despite earlier speculation of his departure, Avramović signed a two-year contract extension in December.

In 2006, Singapore were placed in the same group as Iraq, China and Palestine for the 2007 AFC Asian Cup qualification. They defeated Iraq 2–0 in February but lost the next game by a solitary goal to Palestine. Although Singapore lost only to an injury time goal to China and drew the return fixture at home, their 4–2 defeat to Iraq in October confirmed their absence at the 2007 Games. Following an appeal by the FAS, the SNOC gave the green light for Singapore's participation in the under-23 football competition at the 2006 AFC Asian Games in November. This marked the first time in 16 years that the football team was sent to the Asian Games. Although the Young Lions were boosted by the addition of naturalised players Shi Jiayi and Itimi Dickson, they failed to clear the first hurdle, ending up third in their group after draws with Syria and Indonesia, and a loss to Iraq.

Singapore co-hosted the 2007 AFF Championship (Note: Previously known as Tiger Cup from 1996 to 2004. Reverted to ASEAN Football Championship in 2007 after Tiger Beer discontinued their sponsorship. Known as AFF Suzuki Cup from 2008 after Suzuki came in as new title sponsors.) with Thailand. They began their title defence with a goalless draw against Vietnam on 13 January. Two days later, striker Noh Alam Shah scored seven goals in an 11–0 national team record win over Laos. Singapore advanced to the semi-finals after topping their group following a 2–2 draw with Indonesia. They met Malaysia in the semi-finals, progressing on a penalty shootout after extra time following 1–1 stalemates in both legs. Singapore took on Thailand, a team they had not defeated in a competitive fixture for 30 years, in the finals. They beat Thailand 2–1 in the first leg on 31 January, in which the Lions converted a controversial penalty on 83 minutes and the Thai players staged a walk-out as a protest before returning 15 minutes later. Thailand were leading 1–0 in Bangkok before a Khairul Amri scorcher won the tie 3–2 on aggregate and gave Singapore back-to-back tournament wins. With the final win, Singapore established an unbeaten run of 15 matches under Avramović dating back to the 2004 tournament and a tournament record of 17 matches without a loss going back to 2002.

Avramović scouted Hariss Harun and handed him his international debut in a friendly against North Korea on 24 June 2007. With this appearance, Hariss became the youngest ever player to play for Singapore at the age of 16 years and 217 days, breaking the previous record held by Singapore legend Fandi Ahmad who debuted at 17 years, 3 months and 23 days. Avramović would later describe Hariss as an "exceptional player". Singapore were drawn against Palestine in the first round of the 2010 FIFA World Cup qualification. The Lions won the first match 4–0 (Note: Due to security reasons, Palestine played their home leg in Qatar.) and were awarded a 3–0 walkover win in the home leg after Palestine failed to turn up for the fixture. (Note: Singapore were awarded a 3–0 win after Palestine failed to appear. The Palestine Football Federation appealed to have the match rescheduled on the grounds that its players did not receive permits to leave the Gaza Strip but FIFA dismissed the appeal.) On 1 November, Avramović called up striker Aleksandar Đurić, who was not on the FAS's Foreign Sports Talent Scheme and had gained Singaporean citizenship in September for non-footballing reasons. Đurić made his international debut at the age of 37 years and 89 days against Tajikistan in the first leg of the second round of the World Cup qualifiers on 9 November, contributing with an immediate impact by scoring both goals in a 2–0 victory. Hours prior to kick-off in the same match, national team captain Aide Iskandar announced his immediate retirement from international football. Aide had been suspended from the national team and missed a friendly against UAE and the World Cup qualifier against Palestine after he was banned for insulting a domestic league referee in August. (Note: Aide Iskandar was banned for reportedly insulting referee Sukhbir Singh with "How much did you bet on the game?" after his team, Geylang United controversially lost to Home United in a S.League match by conceding two goals in the final five minutes.) Singapore defeated Tajikistan 3–1 on aggregate to reach the third round for the first time. Avramović then led the Singapore under-23 team at the 2007 Southeast Asian Games in December where they won the bronze medal. Their performances in 2007 won the Lions and Avramović the Team of the Year and the Coach of the Year awards at the Singapore Sports Awards respectively. Avramović was only the third football coach after Choo Seng Quee and Jita Singh to achieve the coaching honour.

The World Cup third qualifying round draw grouped Singapore with Uzbekistan, Saudi Arabia and Lebanon, with fixtures starting in February 2008. Despite two wins over Lebanon, the gulf in quality was evident in a 7–3 home defeat to Uzbekistan. Saudi Arabia and Uzbekistan also had 3–0 victories awarded in place of 2–0 and 1–0 wins respectively as a result of Singapore fielding an ineligible player. Defending champions Singapore started the 2008 AFF Championship with a perfect record in the group stage, registering wins over Cambodia, Myanmar and co-hosts Indonesia. The first leg of the semi-finals against Vietnam ended in a goalless draw. Singapore then conceded a late goal in the home leg to bow out of the competition to the eventual tournament winners.

Singapore were placed in Group E of the 2011 AFC Asian Cup qualification along with Thailand, 2008 West Asian champions Iran and runners-up Jordan. They were trounced 6–0 away to Iran in January 2009 but defeated Jordan 2–1 at home two weeks later. Singapore lost 3–1 to Thailand at Kallang in November; the reverse fixture saw Singapore defeat Thailand 1–0. Further losses to Iran and Jordan in early 2010 condemned Singapore to the bottom of the group. Avramović considers Singapore's failure to qualify for the 2011 Asian Cup as his biggest regret as Singapore coach. Their next assignment was the 2010 AFF Championship in December. Singapore were held to a shock 1–1 draw with the Philippines in their Group B opener and needed an injury-time goal to defeat Myanmar 2–1 in the next match. Co-hosts and defending champions Vietnam's solitary goal in the third match meant that Singapore failed to progress to the knockout stages since 2002.

Following the disappointing exit at the Suzuki Cup amid reports of ill-discipline in the players, the FAS decided to disband and revamp the national team, with FAS president Zainudin Nordin declaring that only four or five players would be retained in the new-look squad. Avramović, however, preached caution in the selection of players for the national team. In the 33-man provisional squad announced for the friendlies and the upcoming World Cup qualifiers, thirteen players received their first call-ups while eight players from the 2010 Suzuki Cup squad were dropped. The FAS specified their targets of reaching the third round of the World Cup qualifiers and a spot in the 2012 Suzuki Cup final. Singapore were drawn against traditional rivals Malaysia in the second round of the 2014 FIFA World Cup qualification. On 23 July 2011, Singapore defeated Malaysia 5–3 at the Jalan Besar Stadium. The Lions held Malaysia to a 1–1 draw in Kuala Lumpur five days later to progress 6–4 on aggregate to the next round. The third round draw assigned Singapore to the same group as Iraq, Jordan and China. Singapore lost all their matches and ended bottom of the group, scoring two goals and conceding twenty. The 7–1 defeat to Iraq in February 2012 led to calls for Avramović to step down and had him consider rejecting a contract renewal. Despite receiving two coaching offers, Avramović decided to stay on as national coach. On 11 April 2012, Singapore dropped to their lowest ever FIFA ranking of 158. The poor run continued with friendly match defeats to Malaysia and the Philippines, a first in 40 years.

In October 2012, it was reported that Avramović and the FAS had come to a mutual agreement that his contract would not be extended, regardless of the team's performance at the 2012 AFF Championship. Singapore were drawn with co-hosts Malaysia, Indonesia and Laos in Group B. On 21 November, the FAS announced the 22-man final squad, with Avramović selecting only five defenders for the tournament. Singapore opened their campaign with a 3–0 win over defending champions Malaysia. Despite a 1–0 loss to Indonesia in the next match, Singapore managed to top the group with a narrow 4–3 win over Laos. The semi-finals showdown pitted Singapore against the Philippines. The first leg in Manila ended in a stalemate. In the return leg, Khairul Amri scored the only goal of the game to send Singapore through to the finals. The finals set up Singapore against Thailand, both three-times winners of the tournament against each other. Singapore established a two-goal lead going into the second leg with a 3–1 home victory over Thailand on 19 December. Prior to the second leg, Avramović confirmed earlier reports that he would step down as coach of Singapore after the tournament. Although Thailand won by a goal in Bangkok three days later, the 3–2 aggregate win confirmed Singapore as the record 4-times winners of the Cup and a third tournament win for Avramović. Following the end of the 2012 AFF Championship, the FAS announced Avramović's departure as national coach.

=== Myanmar ===
In February 2014, Avramović was appointed as Myanmar's national coach on a one-and-a-half-year contract. On 17 October the Myanmar Football Federation announced that they were parting ways with Avramović, and that he was being replaced by Gerd Zeise who had led Myanmar to the 2015 FIFA U-20 World Cup.

=== Home United ===
In July 2019, he was revealed as the head coach of Home United. However, his stint was abruptly cut short a month later in August after his diagnosis with lung cancer became public.

== Personal life ==
Avramović met his wife Bratislava in the summer of 1973 and they married two years later. She gave up a career in psychology to follow him to England when he signed for Notts County. They have a son and two grandsons.

He suffered lung cancer in 2019 which ended his managerial career. He relocated to his native Serbia for treatment.

== Career statistics ==
=== Club ===
Appearances and goals by club, season and competition
Club	Season	League			National cup (Note: Includes Yugoslav Cup, FA Cup.)		League cup (Note: Includes Football League Cup.)		Europe		Total	
Club	Season	Division	Apps	Goals	Apps	Goals	Apps	Goals	Apps	Goals	Apps	Goals
Borac Čačak	1967–68	Second League	1	0			—		—		1	0
Borac Čačak	1968–69	Second League	29	0			—		—		29	0
Borac Čačak	1969–70	Second League	29	0			—		—		29	0
Borac Čačak	1970–71	Second League	28	0			—		—		28	0
Borac Čačak	1971–72	Second League	34	0			—		—		34	0
Borac Čačak	1972–73	Second League	34	1			—		—		34	1
Borac Čačak	1973–74	Second League	34	2			—		—		34	2
Borac Čačak	1974–75	Second League	16	2			—		—		16	2
Borac Čačak	Total		205	5	0	0	0	0	0	0	205	5
Rijeka	1974–75	First League	5	0	—		—		—		5	0
Rijeka	1975–76	First League	16	0	1	0	—		—		17	0
Rijeka	1976–77	First League	34	0	2	0	—		—		36	0
Rijeka	1977–78	First League	31	0	5	0	—		—		36	0
Rijeka	1978–79	First League	32	0	6	0	—		4 (Note: Appearances in Cup Winners' Cup.)	0	42	0
Rijeka	1979–80	First League	1	0	0	0	—		0	0	1	0
Rijeka	Total		119	0	14	0	0	0	4	0	137	0
Notts County	1979–80	Second Division	33	0	0	0	2	0	—		35	0
Notts County	1980–81	Second Division	38	0	1	0	6	0	—		45	0
Notts County	1981–82	First Division	42	0	0	0	2	0	—		42	0
Notts County	1982–83	First Division	36	0	2	0	5	0	—		41	0
Notts County	Total		149	0	3	0	15	0	0	0	167	0
Coventry City	1983–84	First Division	18	0	4	0	2	0	—		24	0
OFK Belgrade	1984–85	Second League	25	0			—		—		25	0
Career total			516	5	21	0	17	0	4	0	558	5

=== International ===
Appearances and goals by national team and year
National team	Year	Apps	Goals
Yugoslavia	1978	1	0
Total		1	0

== Managerial statistics ==
=== Performance by national team ===
National team	From	To	Record				
National team	From	To	G	W	D	L	Win %
Kuwait	February 2002	December 2002	12	6	4	2	50.00
Singapore	July 2003	December 2012	64	24	13	27	37.50
Myanmar	February 2014	October 2015	22	7	4	11	31.82
Total			98	37	21	40	37.76

Only competitive matches included. Updated as of 13 October 2015.

== Honours ==
=== Player ===
Borac Čačak

- Yugoslav Second League East Division: 1972–73

Rijeka

- Yugoslav Cup: 1978, 1979
- Balkans Cup: 1978

Notts County

- Second Division Promotion: 1980–81

OFK Belgrade

- Yugoslav Second League East Division: 1984–85

=== Individual ===
- Notts County Player of the Season: 1983

=== Manager ===
Kuwait

- West Asian Games: 2002

Muscat Club

- Omani League: 2002–03

Singapore

- AFF Championship: 2004, 2007, 2012
- Southeast Asian Games (U-23): Bronze – 2007

Myanmar

- Philippine Peace Cup: 2014

=== Individual ===
- ASEAN Football Federation Coach of the Year: 2013
- Singapore Sports Council Coach of the Year: 2007
