= Tasso Koutsoukos =

Canadian soccer player

Personal information
- Date of birth: April 4, 1959 (age 67)
- Place of birth: Montreal, Quebec
- Positions: Forward; midfielder

College career
Years	Team	Apps	(Gls)
1977–1979	UMass Minutemen		

Senior career*
Years	Team	Apps	(Gls)
1980–1982	Chicago Sting	43	(4)
1980–1982	Chicago Sting (indoor)	29	(24)
1982	Tulsa Roughnecks	11	(1)
1982–1983	Chicago Sting (indoor)	41	(36)
1983	Inter-Montréal		
1983–1986	Kansas City Comets (indoor)	119	(73)
1986–1987	Minnesota Strikers (indoor)	37	(14)
1987–1988	Kansas City Comets (indoor)	61	(25)
1988–1991	Montreal Supra	94	(15)

Managerial career
- 1998–2000: Montreal Impact
- * Club domestic league appearances and goals

Tasso Koutsoukos (born April 4, 1959) is a retired Canadian soccer player who played professionally in the North American Soccer League, Major Indoor Soccer League and Canadian Soccer League. He also coached in the Montreal Impact in the National Professional Soccer League.

== Player ==
Koutsoukos played collegiate soccer at UMass Amherst from 1977 to 1979. He was a 1977 Honorable Mention (third team) All American. In 1980, the Chicago Sting selected Koutsoukos in the North American Soccer League draft. He played two outdoor and two indoor seasons with the Sting. In 1982, he began the season with Chicago. On June 13, 1982, the Sting traded Koutsoukos to the Tulsa Roughnecks in exchange for Tim Twellman and John Tyma. In the fall of 1982, he returned to the Sting which was playing in the Major Indoor Soccer League. In 1983, Tasso played for Inter-Montréal. He later signed as a free agent with the Kansas City Comets. On January 31, 1986, the Comets traded Koutsoukos to the Minnesota Strikers in exchange for John Bain. On February 26, 1987, the Strikers sold Koutsoukos contract back to the Comets. In 1988, he moved to the Montreal Supra of the Canadian Soccer League.

== Coach ==
In 1998, Koutsoukos was hired to coach the Montreal Impact of the National Professional Soccer League.
