= Mike Twellman =

American soccer player

Personal information
- Date of birth: December 18, 1960 (age 65)
- Place of birth: St. Louis, Missouri, United States
- Height: 5 ft 3 in (1.60 m)
- Position: Defender

Youth career
- 1979–1982: Southern Illinois University Edwardsville

Senior career*
Years	Team	Apps	(Gls)
1982–1983	Chicago Sting (MISL)	26	(13)
1982–1983	Chicago Sting	14	(0)
1983–1984	Chicago Sting (NASL indoor)	14	(0)
1984	Jacksonville Tea Men		
1984–1985	Dallas Sidekicks (indoor)	41	(4)
- * Club domestic league appearances and goals

Mike Twellman (born December 18, 1960, in St. Louis, Missouri) is a retired U.S. soccer defender who played two seasons in the North American Soccer League, one in the United Soccer League and two in the first Major Indoor Soccer League.

== High school and college ==
Twellman, and his brothers Tim, and Steve, grew up in the soccer hot bed of St. Louis, Missouri. Twellman, along with his brothers, attended and played soccer at St. Louis University High School. He attended Southern Illinois University Edwardsville where he played on the men's soccer team from 1979 to 1982. In 1979, he was a member of the SIUE NCAA Men's Soccer Championship team. Twellman was inducted into the SIUE Athletic Hall of Fame in 2006 as part of the 1979 national championship soccer team.

== Professional ==
In 1982, Twellman was drafted by both the Chicago Sting of the North American Soccer League and the St. Louis Steamers of Major Indoor Soccer League (MISL). He chose to sign with the Sting and played two seasons in Chicago. In 1984, the Sting released Twellman and he moved to the Jacksonville Tea Men of the United Soccer League. On October 2, 1984, Twellman signed as a free agent with the Dallas Sidekicks of the Major Indoor Soccer League (MISL). He played the 1984–1985 season and was released by the team on April 16, 1985.
