= Sylvie Béliveau =

Canadian soccer coach

Personal information
- Date of birth: 8 December 1963 (age 62)

Managerial career
- Years: Team
- Canada

Sylvie Béliveau (born 8 December 1963) is a Canadian soccer coach.

== Career ==
Béliveau was the head coach of the Canada women's national team at the 1995 FIFA Women's World Cup.

== Honours ==
- Tony Waiters Coaching Excellence Award: 2023
