= John Tyma =

American soccer player

Personal information
- Date of birth: October 13, 1958 (age 68)
- Place of birth: Cleveland, Ohio, United States
- Position: Forward

College career
Years	Team	Apps	(Gls)
1976–1979	Cleveland State Vikings		

Senior career*
Years	Team	Apps	(Gls)
1980–1981	Chicago Sting	14	(4)
1980–1982	Chicago Sting (indoor)	15	(1)
1982	Tulsa Roughnecks	5	(0)
1982–1983	Chicago Sting	5	(0)
1982–1983	Chicago Sting (indoor)	23	(1)
- * Club domestic league appearances and goals

John Tyma (born October 13, 1958, in Cleveland, Ohio) is a retired American soccer forward who played professionally in the North American Soccer League and Major Indoor Soccer League.

== Youth ==
Tyma graduated from Brecksville-Broadview Heights High School where he was member of the 1976 Ohio State High School soccer championship team. He finished his high school career with 76 goals and 23 assists and was a 1975 and 1976 First Team All State player. Tyma attended Cleveland State University where he played on the men's soccer team from 1976 to 1979. He was inducted into the Cleveland State Athletic Hall of Fame in 1997.

== Professional ==
In 1980, Tyma turned professional with the Chicago Sting of the North American Soccer League. On March 31, 1982, the Sting traded Tyma, Dave Huson and their 1983 third round draft pick to the Tulsa Roughnecks in exchange for Duncan McKenzie. Tyma played five games for the Roughnecks. On June 13, 1982, the Roughnecks Tyma and Tim Twellman to the Sting in exchange for Tasso Koutsoukos. In the winter of 1982–1983, the Sting played in the Major Indoor Soccer League.

He was inducted into the Illinois State Soccer Association Hall of Fame in 1992.
