= Bryan Rosenfeld =

Canadian soccer player and coach

Personal information
- Date of birth: 18 September 1965 (age 61)
- Place of birth: Thunder Bay, Ontario, Canada
- Position: Goalkeeper

Senior career*
Years	Team	Apps	(Gls)
1987-1988	Hamilton Steelers	20	(0)
1988-1989	Winnipeg Fury	10	(0)
1991	Toronto Blizzard	3	(0)
1992	London Lasers	12	(0)
1993–1994	Toronto Rockets		
1995	Toronto Italia	3	(0)

International career
1985	Canada U20	9	(0)
1987	Canada	1	(0)

Managerial career
- 2008: Canada U17 women
- * Club domestic league appearances and goals

Bryan Rosenfeld (born 19 September 1965) is a Canadian retired professional soccer player and former head coach of the Canadian U-17 Women national soccer team.

== Career ==
Rosenfeld played club football for Hamilton Steelers, and Toronto Blizzard. In 1993, he joined the Toronto Rockets and played two seasons with the organization. In 1995, he signed with Toronto Italia of the Canadian National Soccer League. He made his debut for the club on 5 June 1995 in a match against Scarborough Astros.

== International career ==
Rosenfeld earned 1 cap for the Canadian national side in 1987. He also played for the Canada men's national under-20 soccer team and made his debut on 24 August 1985 against Nigeria in the 1985 FIFA World Youth Championship.

== Managerial career ==
In 2004, he serves as a goalkeeper coach under Frank Yallop for the Canada men's national soccer team. In 2008, he was named the head coach for the Canada women's national under-17 soccer team. and returned to that role in 2010.
