= Kevin Holness =

Jamaican-born Canadian soccer player

Personal information
- Full name: Kevin Keith Holness
- Date of birth: September 25, 1971 (age 55)
- Place of birth: Kingston, Jamaica
- Height: 5 ft 8 in (1.73 m)
- Position: Midfielder

Youth career
- 1989: Langara College

Senior career*
Years	Team	Apps	(Gls)
1989–1992	Winnipeg Fury	100	(5)
1993	Toronto Blizzard	23	(2)
1994–1997	Montreal Impact	65	(2)
1995–1996	Wichita Wings (indoor)	5	
1996–1997	Toronto Shooting Stars (indoor)	12	
1996–2001	Edmonton Drillers (indoor)	166	
1997–1999	Toronto Lynx	15	(1)
2000	Vancouver 86ers	28	(1)
2001	Vancouver Whitecaps FC	9	(0)

International career^{‡}
1990–1992	Canada U23	13	(0)
1995–1996	Canada	9	(2)

Managerial career
- 2007–2008: Saskatoon Accelerators
- * Club domestic league appearances and goals as of 11 November 2009 ‡ National team caps and goals as of 11 November 2009

Kevin Holness (born September 25, 1971) is a former Canadian international soccer player.

== Club career ==
Holness spent his entire outdoor soccer career in Canada, playing for Winnipeg Fury, Toronto Blizzard, Montreal Impact, Toronto Lynx, Vancouver 86ers and Vancouver Whitecaps FC.

Also, Holness played indoor soccer with Toronto Shooting Stars, Wichita Wings and most prominently with Edmonton Drillers in the NPSL.

== International career ==
Holness played in all three of Canada's games at the 1987 FIFA U-16 World Championship which were held in Canada. He played there in a team also featuring Paul Peschisolido and Carl Fletcher.

He made senior his debut for Canada in a May 1995 Canada Cup match against Northern Ireland and earned a total of 9 caps, scoring 2 goals, both against Honduras at the 1996 CONCACAF Gold Cup. His final international was a June 1996 friendly match against Costa Rica.

=== International goals ===
Scores and results list Canada's goal tally first.

#	Date	Venue	Opponent	Score	Result	Competition
1	10 January 1996	Edison International Field, Anaheim, United States	Honduras	2-0	3-1	1996 CONCACAF Gold Cup
2	10 January 1996	Edison International Field, Anaheim, United States	Honduras	3-1	3-1	1996 CONCACAF Gold Cup

== Coaching career ==
Holness was the inaugural coach of the Saskatoon Accelerators of the Canadian Major Indoor Soccer League before resigning prior to the start of the 2009/2010 season. Holness is currently the technical director for FC Regina in Regina, Saskatchewan.

== Honours ==
- Canada Soccer President's Award: 2016
