= Montreal Supra =

Former soccer team in Montreal, Quebec

- Full name: FC Supra de Montréal
- Nickname: Supra
- Founded: 1988
- Dissolved: 1992
- Stadium: Complexe sportif Claude-Robillard
- Capacity: 9,300
- League: Canadian Soccer League
Home colours	Away colours

Montreal Supra FC (French: FC Supra de Montréal) was a Canadian professional soccer club based in Montreal, Quebec that played in the Canadian Soccer League from 1988 to 1992.

== History ==
Montreal Supra joined the Canadian Soccer League as an expansion franchise for the league's second season in 1988. They were Montreal's first professional soccer team, since the NASL's Montreal Manic and CPSL's FC Inter-Montréal both folded in 1983. It was created by an investment by O'Keefe Brewery, one of Canada's three largest breweries, as the main sponsor. The club was to be a community property as a non-profit corporation controlled by a board of directors made up of 12 voters: six founding companies (including O'Keefe) plus six representatives of small investors. The club's goal when it was founded was to provide a platform for local players, with 13 of the 18 players in their inaugural season coming from the Quebec Semi-Professional League.

Supra had a difficult inaugural season, finishing last in the East Division with a record of 8–8–12 and failing to make the playoffs. The team also struggled in their second season winning only 3 of their 26 matches, once again failing to make the playoffs. The team struggled financially, with the players agreeing to play without pay in 1989, later being paid with Ultramar gas coupons. In 1990, they greatly improved to a record of 13–11–2, qualifying for the playoffs for the first time, but lost in the first round to Hamilton. Prior to the 1991 season, former Montreal Manic coach Eddie Firmani was hired as the named coach and general manager of the team. In 1991, they finished 5th out of 8 teams, qualifying for the playoffs for the second year in a row, where they were once again defeated by Hamilton in the first round. In their final season, they finished in 4th place out of 8 teams, qualifying for the playoffs for the third consecutive year, where they were once again eliminated in the first round, this time by the Vancouver 86ers. In 1992, the club also competed in the Professional Cup, one of two invited CSL teams along with Vancouver, where they were eliminated in the first round by APSL club Tampa Bay Rowdies, losing 7–1 on aggregate (5–1 and 2–0).

The team underwent severe financial difficulty in the early 1990s, ultimately with a Florida-based Spanish businessman named Frank Aliaga, who had ties to Canada, purchased the club in 1990 to keep the club in operation, as the previous season the players had not received a salary. In addition, over the club's three seasons owned by Aliaga, the club went through six coaches. After the 1991 season, the team's main sponsors - Ultramar, Molson O'Keefe and Saputo - indicated that they were no longer interested in sponsoring the team. Aliaga hired Pino Asaro, who had been the manager of the Cosmos de LaSalle in the semi-professional Ligue nationale de soccer du Québec at the end of the 1980s, as general manager to help save the franchise. He managed to convince the sponsors to remain with the club and also attracted Bell Long Distance as a new sponsor. At the same time, the league was not doing well financially either, with the league commissioner, Dale Barnes, leaving and Supra owner Frank Aliaga being named the new league president.

After the 1992 season the league was set to fold, and Aliaga approached Asaro to inquire into the possibility of the club joining the US-based American Professional Soccer League. Montreal had been approved by the APSL, however, Aliaga was not able to meet the financial requirements to enter a club in the league, as Supra's budget was only one-third of the APSL's minimum requirement. APSL commissioner Bill Sage inquired to Asaro if there was any interest from another party about operating a Montreal APSL team and Asaro immediately called Joey Saputo, who was able to arrange a meeting with Lino Saputo, owner of Saputo Inc., one of Supra's four main sponsors about taking over the team.

The Saputos purchased the club from Aliaga, and wanted the club to be the successor to Supra, maintaining much of the team's organizational staff and players for the new team. Supra was dissolved and a new club called the Montreal Impact formed as a new APSL club. Many of Montreal Supra's best players would join the expansion Impact, winning the league championship in 1994, during the team's second season.

In 2025, a new Montreal-area club playing in Laval was founded in the Canadian Premier League, who selected the name FC Supra du Québec to pay homage to the former Montreal Supra.

== Seasons ==
Season	Tier	League	Record	Rank	Playoffs	Ref
1988	1	Canadian Soccer League	8–8–12	5th, East	Did not qualify	
1989	1	Canadian Soccer League	3–9–14	5th, East	Did not qualify	
1990	1	Canadian Soccer League	13–11–2	2nd, East	Quarter-finals	
1991	1	Canadian Soccer League	11–7–10	5th	Quarter-finals	
1992	1	Canadian Soccer League	6–7–7	4th	Semi-finals	

== Notable players ==
- (South Africa) Michael Araujo
- (Canada) Mauro Biello
- (Canada) Alex Bunbury
- (Canada) Nick De Santis
- (Canada) Patrick Diotte
- (Canada) Rudy Doliscat
- (Costa Rica) Leonidas Flores
- (Canada) Iain Fraser
- (France) Christian Gourcuff
- (Canada) Pat Harrington
- (Scotland) Ronnie Hildersley
- (Canada) Lyndon Hooper
- (England) (Canada) Simon Keith
- (Canada) Tasso Koutsoukos
- (Canada) Tom Kouzmanis
- (Canada) Grant Needham
- (Canada) Marco Rizi
- (Canada) Jean Robert Toussaint
- (Canada) Cameron Walker
- (Canada) Mark Watson

== Head coaches ==
- (Canada) Andy Onorato (1988–1989)
- (Romania) (Canada) Pierre Mindru (1989–1990 and 1991–1992)
- (South Africa) Roy Wiggemansen (1990–1991)
- (Italy) (South Africa) Eddie Firmani (1991)
- (Canada) Paolo Ferrante (1991)
- (Netherlands) Bobby Vosmaer (1992)
- (Canada) Pino Asaro (1992)

== See also ==
- Montreal Manic
- Montreal Olympique
- Montreal Impact (1992–2011)
- CF Montréal
- FC Supra du Québec
