= Ian Carter =

Canadian soccer player

Personal information
- Full name: Ian Noel Carter
- Date of birth: 20 September 1967 (age 59)
- Place of birth: Birmingham, England
- Position: Defender

Senior career*
Years	Team	Apps	(Gls)
1987–1988	Toronto Italia		
1991	Kitchener Kickers	11	(0)
1991–1992	North York Rockets	17	(2)
1992	Winnipeg Fury	13	(0)
1993	Toronto Blizzard	10	(0)
1993–1994	Peterborough United	11	(0)
1994–1995	Dover Athletic		
1996	Montreal Impact	11	(0)
1997	Toronto Lynx	17	(0)
1998	Toronto Olympians		
2004	Harrisburg City Islanders	5	(0)
Total		54+	(0+)

International career
1986–1987	Canada U20	11	(1)
1992–1996	Canada	8	(0)
- * Club domestic league appearances and goals

Ian Noel Carter (born 20 September 1967) is a Canadian former soccer player who played at both professional and international levels.

== Early and personal life ==
Born in Birmingham, England, Carter grew up in the Canadian city of Mississauga.

== Career ==
=== Club career ===
Carter made his professional debut in 1987 with Toronto Italia, and also played for Winnipeg Fury, Toronto Blizzard, Peterborough United, Dover Athletic, Montreal Impact, Toronto Lynx and Harrisburg City Islanders.

In 1998, he signed with the newly expansion franchise the Toronto Olympians in the newly formed Canadian Professional Soccer League. Throughout the 1998 CPSL season, Carter achieved an undefeated streak with the Olympians the first club within the league to achieve this milestone. As well as winning the regular season and the Open Canada Cup. The club reached the playoff finals but were defeated by the St. Catharines Wolves by 4–2 defeat in a penalty shootout.

== International career ==
Carter was part of the Canadian youth squad at the 1987 FIFA World Youth Championship in Chile. He also was on the Canadian team at the 1987 Pan American Games.

He earned a total of 8 caps for the Canadian senior team.
