= Mike Dodd (soccer) =

Canadian soccer player

Personal information
- Full name: Michael Dodd
- Date of birth: April 24, 1971 (age 55)
- Place of birth: North Vancouver, British Columbia
- Position: Midfielder

College career
Years	Team	Apps	(Gls)
1989–1990	Capilano Blues		

Senior career*
Years	Team	Apps	(Gls)
1991–1993	Winnipeg Fury	31+	(3+)
1993	→ Vancouver 86ers (loan)	3	(0)
1994–1998	Vancouver 86ers	31	(2)

International career
1991–1992	Canada U23	10	(0)
- * Club domestic league appearances and goals

Mike Dodd (born April 24, 1971) is a Canadian former soccer player.

== Career ==
Dodd began playing at the college level in 1989 with Capilano College. In 1991, he was drafted by the Vancouver 86ers of the Canadian Soccer League (CSL), but was loaned to the Winnipeg Fury. In 1992, he signed a contract with Winnipeg and secured the Mita Cup. After the demise of the CSL the Fury joined the Canadian National Soccer League, and he re-signed with Winnipeg. During the 1993 season he was temporarily loaned to the Vancouver 86ers of the American Professional Soccer League.

In 1994, he permanently signed with Vancouver, and played with them until the 1998 USISL A-League season. In 1998, he was inducted into the Manitoba Sports Hall of Fame and Museum as a member of the 1992 Winnipeg Fury team.

== International career ==
He made his debut for the Canada men's national under-23 soccer team on May 5, 1991, against Trinidad and Tobago in an Olympic qualifier match.

== Honours ==
- Canadian Soccer League: 1

1992
