= Tim Twellman =

American soccer player (born 1955)

Personal information
- Full name: Timothy Twellman
- Date of birth: May 1, 1955 (age 71)
- Place of birth: St. Louis, Missouri, United States
- Positions: Forward; midfielder

College career
Years	Team	Apps	(Gls)
1973–1976	SIU Edwardsville Cougars		

Senior career*
Years	Team	Apps	(Gls)
1977–1981	Minnesota Kicks	109	(5)
1979–1981	Minnesota Kicks (indoor)	28	(8)
1982	Tulsa Roughnecks	21	(0)
1982–1983	Chicago Sting	26	(1)
1983–1984	Chicago Sting (indoor)	44	(13)
1984–1986	Kansas City Comets (indoor)	87	(11)
Total		315	(38)

International career
1982	United States	1	(0)

Managerial career
- 2007–: Villa Duchesne/Oak Hill School
- * Club domestic league appearances and goals

Timothy Twellman (born May 1, 1955) is an American former soccer player who spent seven years in the North American Soccer League and four in the Major Indoor Soccer League. He also earned one cap with the U.S. national team in 1982. After retiring from playing professionally, he has coached high school and youth soccer for over twenty years. He is the father of former New England Revolution striker Taylor Twellman.

== Youth ==
Twellman grew up in St. Louis, Missouri, attending St. Louis University High School. After graduating from high school, he attended Southern Illinois University Edwardsville where he played on the men's soccer team from 1973 to 1976. He is ranked ninth on the school's career scoring list with twenty-seven goals and twenty-two assists. He also played on the school's baseball team in 1975 and 1976.

== Professional ==
In 1977, Twellman signed with the Minnesota Kicks of the North American Soccer League (NASL). He played five seasons with them as a forward, scoring five goals in 109 games. In 1982, he began the season with the Tulsa Roughnecks. On June 13, 1982, the Roughnecks traded Twellman and John Tyma to the Chicago Sting in exchange for Tasso Koutsoukos. He finished the 1982 season with ten games for the Sting, then played sixteen games, scoring one goal as the Sting took the 1984 NASL championship. The NASL collapsed after the 1984 season and several of the league's teams, including the Sting, jumped to the Major Indoor Soccer League. In 1985, Twellman moved to the Kansas City Comets where he spent one season. He retired from playing professionally after the 1985–1986 season.

== National team ==
On March 21, 1982, Twellman earned his only cap with the U.S. national team as a defender in a 2–1 win over Trinidad and Tobago.

== Post-playing career ==
Since retiring from playing, Twellman has devoted himself to coaching as well as marketing soccer gear and apparel. He runs the Twellman Soccer Academy and in 2007, he became the head coach of the Villa Duchesne/Oak Hill School in St. Louis.
