= Steve Twellman =

American soccer player

Personal information
- Date of birth: December 14, 1949 (age 76)
- Place of birth: St. Louis, Missouri, United States
- Position: Left back

Youth career
- 1968–1971: Michigan State

Senior career*
Years	Team	Apps	(Gls)
1972–1973	Atlanta Chiefs/Apollos	0	(0)
1974	Boston Minutemen	10	(0)
- * Club domestic league appearances and goals

Steve Twellman (born December 14, 1949) was a U.S. soccer player who spent three seasons in the North American Soccer League.

Twellman attended Michigan State University where he played on the Spartans soccer team during its first years playing in the NCAA Division I. He was team captain in 1971, earning second team All American recognition that season.

In 1972, the Atlanta Chiefs selected Twellman in the first round of the North American Soccer League college draft. He spent two seasons in Atlanta. In 1973, the team was renamed the Atlanta Apollos when ownership changed. The team folded at the end of the season and Twellman moved to the Boston Minutemen for the 1974 season.
