= Empire Field =

Stadium in Vancouver, British Columbia, Canada

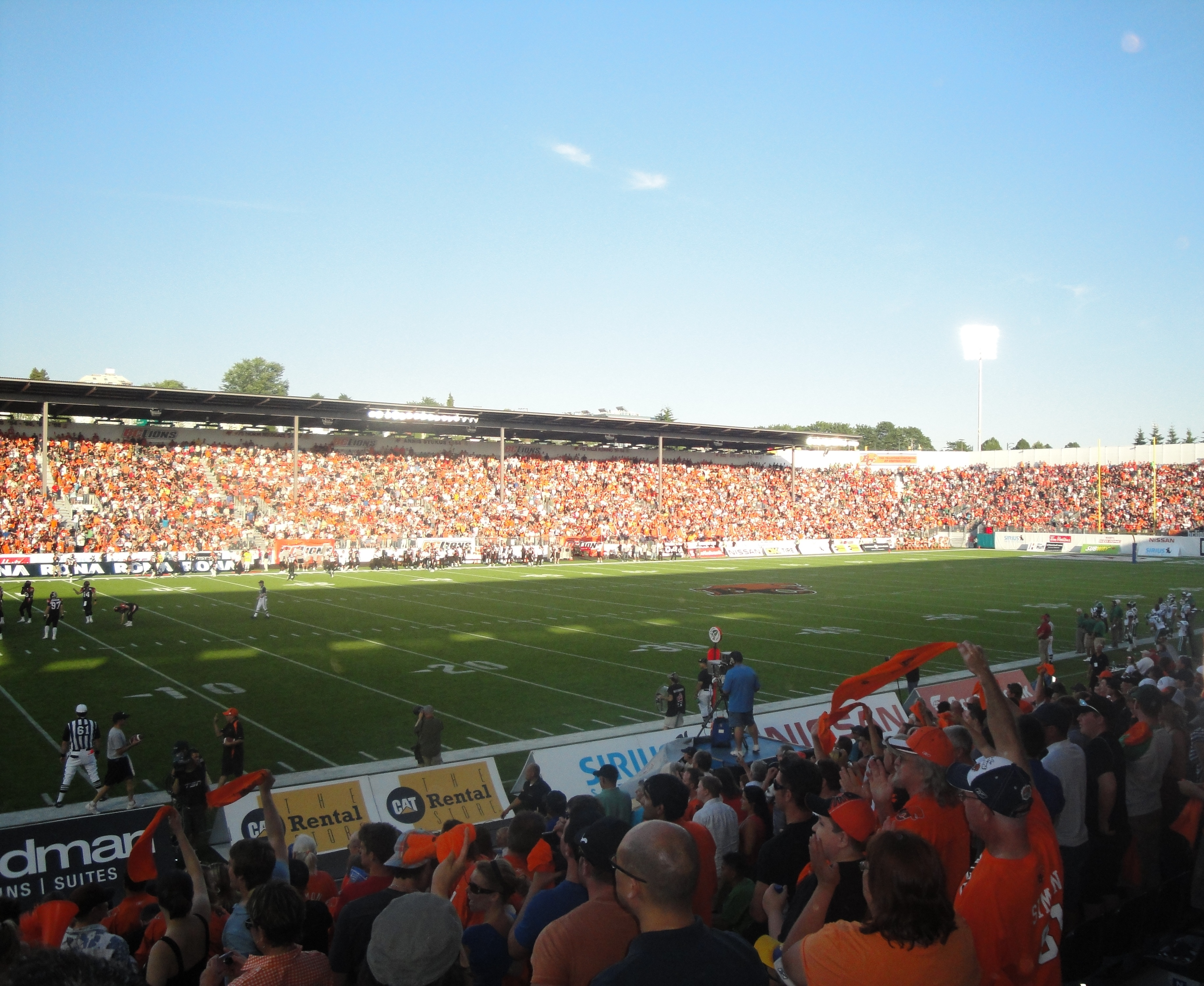
- BC Lions season opener against the Saskatchewan Roughriders on July 10, 2010
- Interactive map of Empire Field
- Location: Hastings Park, Vancouver, British Columbia, Canada
- Coordinates: 49°16′57.5″N 123°1′59.6″W
- Owner: BC Pavilion Corporation
- Operator: Pacific National Exhibition
- Capacity: 27,528
- Executive suites: 12
- Surface: FieldTurf
- Record attendance: 27,528

Construction
- Groundbreaking: March 2010
- Opened: June 15, 2010
- Demolished: November–December 2011
- Cost: $14.4 million
- General contractor: Nussli Group

Tenants
- BC Lions (CFL) (2010–2011); Vancouver Whitecaps FC (MLS) (2011)

Empire Field was a temporary Canadian football and soccer stadium built at Hastings Park in the Canadian city of Vancouver, British Columbia. Located on the site of the former Empire Stadium, the 27,528 spectator venue was constructed while a new retractable roof was installed at BC Place in 2010 and 2011. Empire Field was home to the Canadian Football League's (CFL) BC Lions for the 2010 and part of the 2011 seasons, and for Major League Soccer's (MLS) Vancouver Whitecaps FC for part of their debut 2011 season.

The venue was constructed by Nussli Group in three months, cost $14.4 million and opened on June 15, 2010. The venue featured 20,500 roofed bucket seats—with the remaining 7,000 being benches—12 luxury suites, a press room, flood lighting and a FieldTurf artificial turf. The venue's record attendance are two sell-out matches: for the Lions it occurred in inaugural 2010 regular-season match against the Saskatchewan Roughriders; for the Whitecaps, it was a regular-season match against the Los Angeles Galaxy. Dismantling took place in November and December 2011 and the site is now used as a community playing field.

== History ==
Empire Field was built on the same lot as Empire Stadium, which was originally built for the 1954 British Empire and Commonwealth Games. The 32,375-spectator stadium was used by the Lions from 1954 until 1982. For soccer, the venue was used by North American Soccer League's Vancouver Royals from 1967 to 1968 and subsequently by the Vancouver Whitecaps from 1974 to 1982. Both the Lions and Whitecaps moved to the newly constructed, then 60,000 seat BC Place for the 1983 season. Empire Stadium was demolished in 1993, and the location converted to a community sports park. The Vancouver Board of Parks and Recreation opened Empire Bowl on the site on 2003, which consisted of a 5.5 hectares (14 acres) lot, costing $2.9 million. It had irrigated grass soccer fields, two baseball diamonds and a gravel running track.

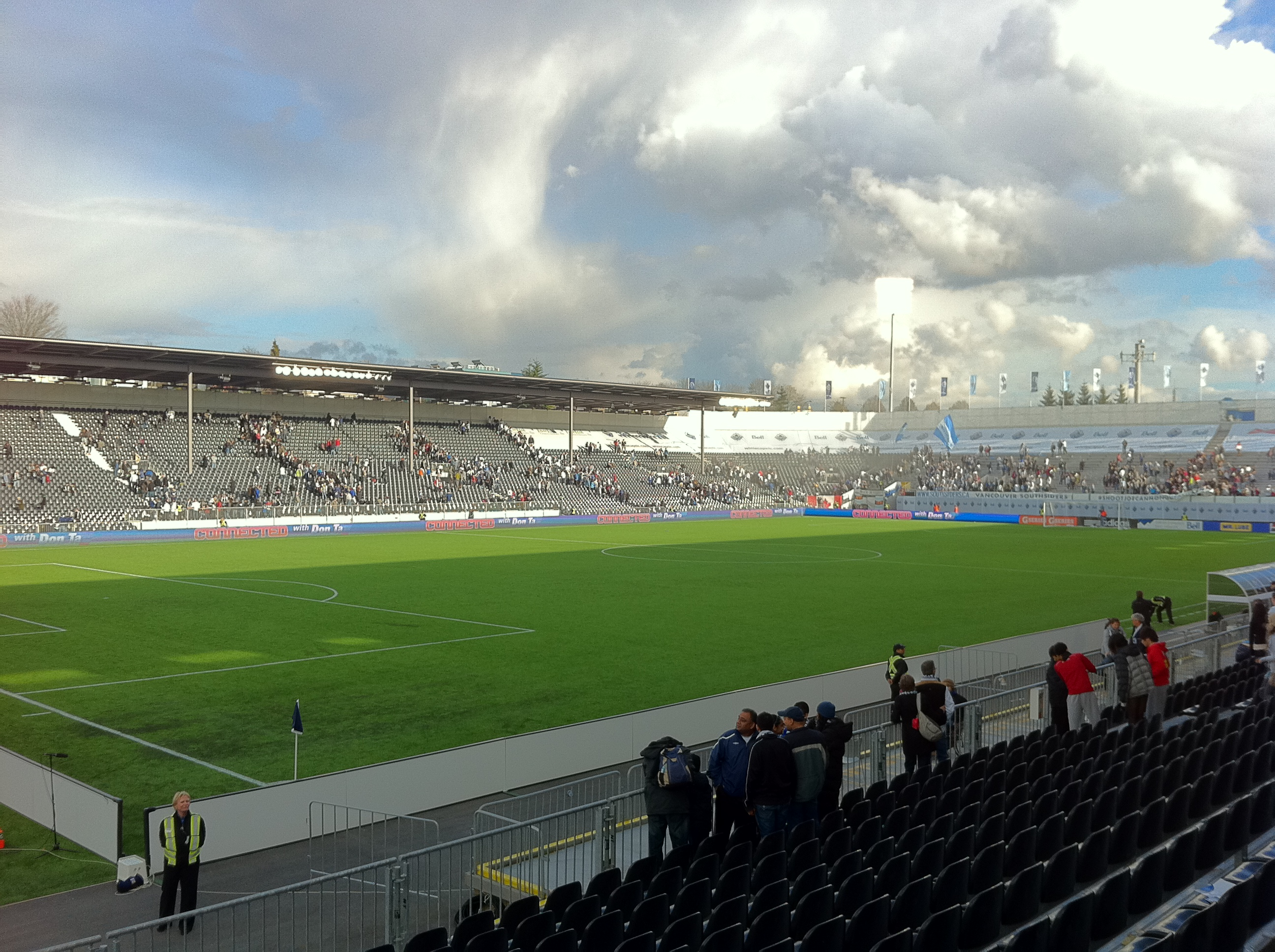
The field in soccer configuration on April 2, 2011

Following a 2007 roof deflation at BC Place, Premier Gordon Campbell announced plans to build a retractable roof on the stadium. Stadium owner and operator BC Pavilion Corporation (PavCo) announced on October 23, 2009 that they had signed a fix-cost agreement with PCL Constructors Canada to build a new roof, including the cost of a temporary stadium. The construction was financed through a loan from the provincial government to PavCo. The decision to build the roof was, according to Whitecaps president Bob Lenarduzzi, "key" to bringing a MLS franchise to Vancouver. In 2009, the Whitecaps signed a five-year agreement to play their home matches at BC Place, starting in 2011.

To allow the Lions to continue playing as normal and support the new Whitecaps franchise, PavCo decided to build the temporary venue at the Pacific National Exhibition (PNE) in Hastings Park in eastern Vancouver. Because BC Place was to be used as the Olympic Stadium during the 2010 Winter Olympics, refurbishment could not start until after February 2010. The details for the stadium were released by PNE and PavCo on December 22, 2009. The venue cost $14.4 million in a fixed-price contract, and was included in the $458 million set aside to renovate BC Place. Representatives from both teams stated that they hoped to play on the nostalgia factor for the affected seasons. The Vancouver Board of Parks and Recreation stated immediately after the press release that they had not been consulted or informed about the decision to build a professional sports venue on their grounds. Although the board was responsible for operating the facilities, the land was owned by PNE, which is again owned by the city. There were no public hearings or a city council vote to decide on the issue.

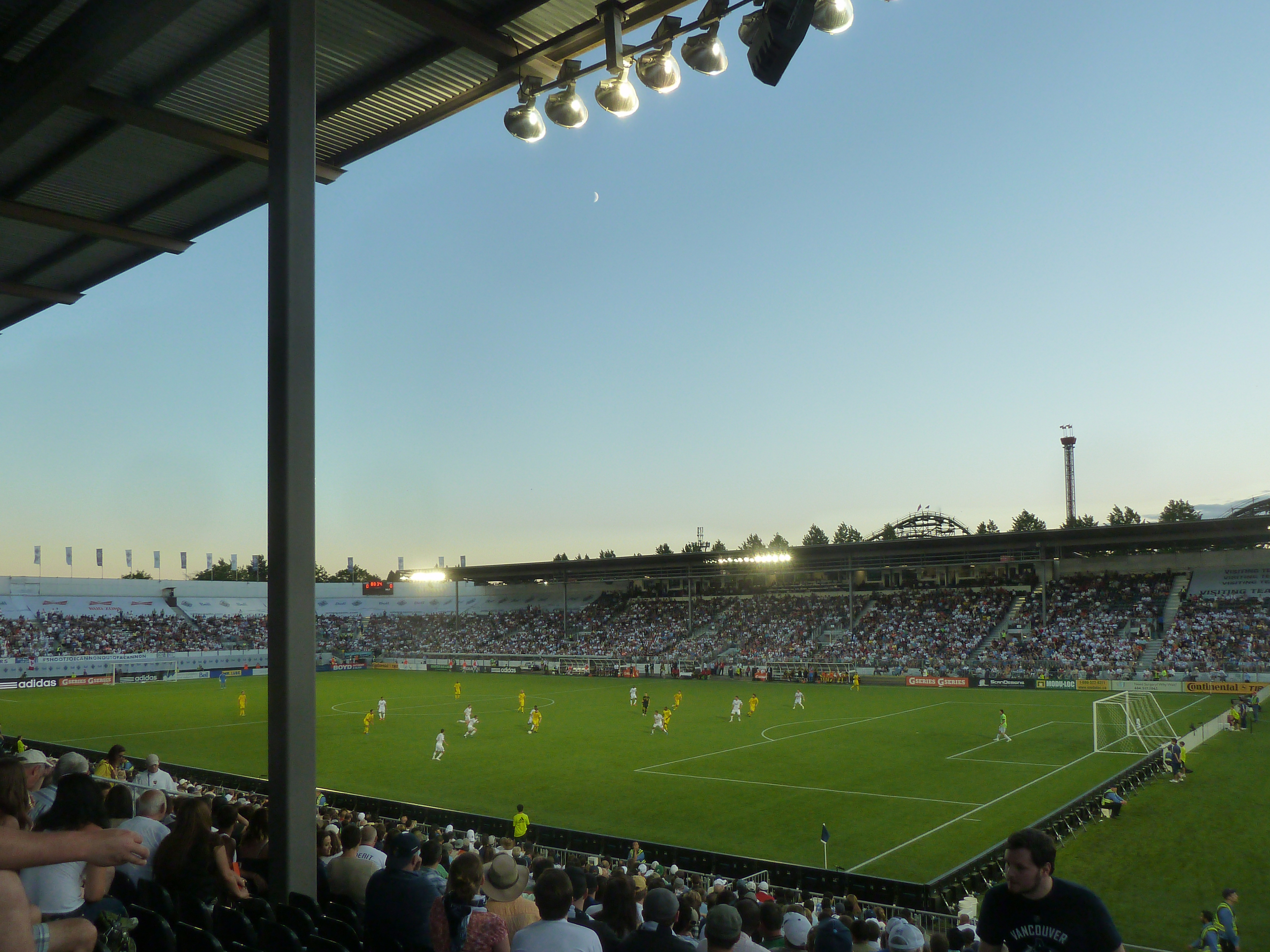
Whitecaps vs. Columbus Crew on July 6, 2011

The contract to build the stadium was issued the Nussli Group of Switzerland, which specializes in the construction of temporary stadiums. They used their NT grandstand system, which allowed for modular construction of stands. Construction implemented 2,500 tonnes of material. Nussli's senior project manager, Florian Weber, stated that the most difficult part of the construction was the occupancy permit, caused by the short construction schedule. Construction took 111 days, and was completed in late June 2010. Several commentators stated that use of temporary stadiums on a permanent basis could be used for other MLS and CFL stadia. For instance, the price of building an 18,500 seat permanent soccer-specific stadium was averaging $200 million.

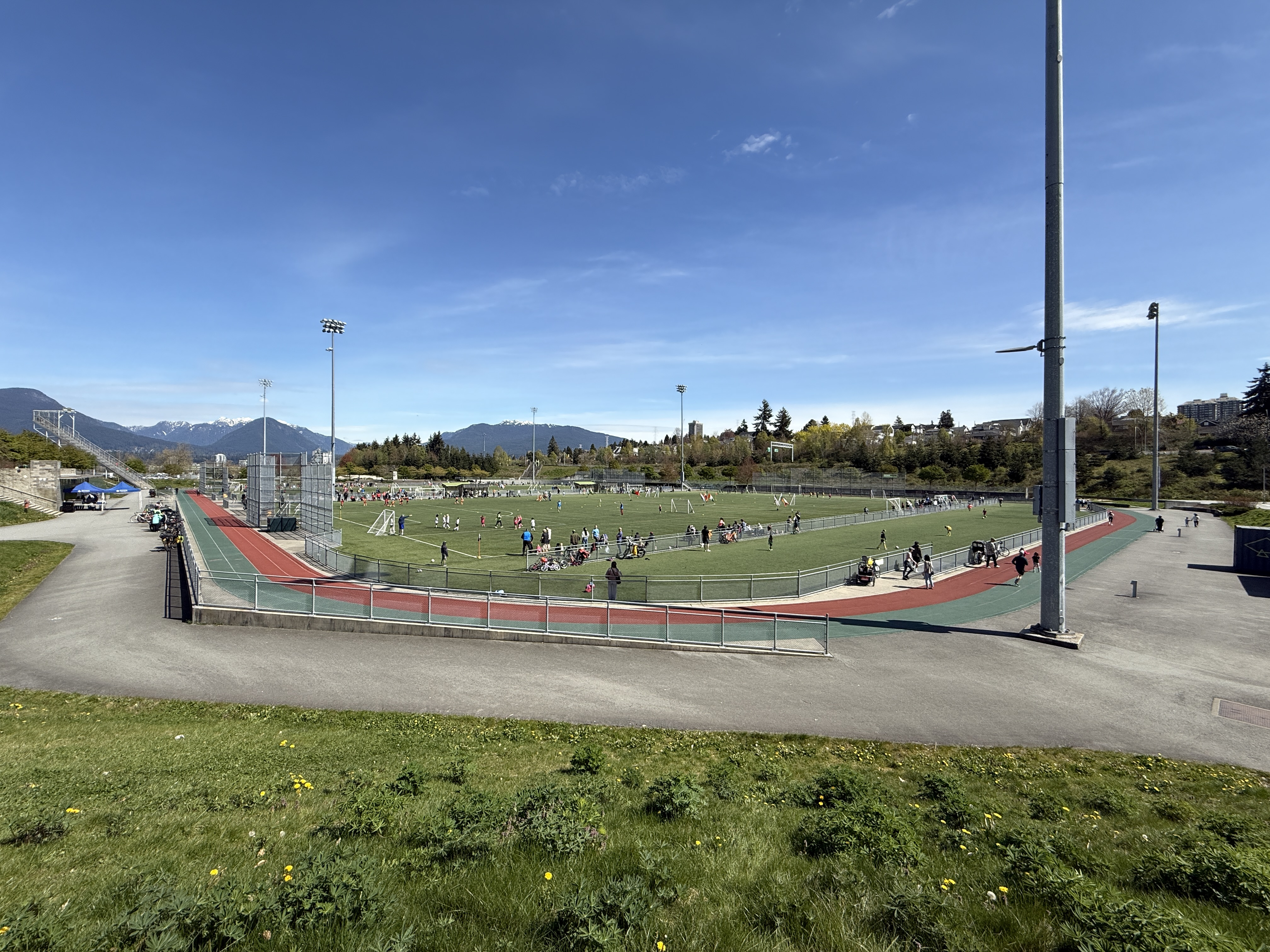
The site is now used as a community playing field

After the reopening of BC Place, the stands at Empire Field were disassembled in November and December 2011, with the turf, locker rooms and lighting masts being left behind. Equipment and components leased from Nussli were returned. Public consultations regarding use of the lot were conducted until June 2012, after which it was decided to create a community sports park. It features a mountain bike park to the north, a 3.9-meter (13 ft) wide running track around the field and a skateboarding and graffiti tunnel. The area around the turf was expanded, allowing for two east–west fields, rather than one north–south. The legacy items were valued at $2.8 million in 2010.

== Specifications ==
Empire Field was located in Hastings Park, in the Vancouver neighbourhood of Hastings-Sunrise, next to Playland, an amusement park. Other sports facilities at Hastings Park include Pacific Coliseum and Agrodome. The venue was owned by the BC Pavilion Corporation, which in turn is owned by the provincial Government of British Columbia. It lies on the grounds of and will be operated by the Pacific National Exhibition, which is owned by the Vancouver City Council.

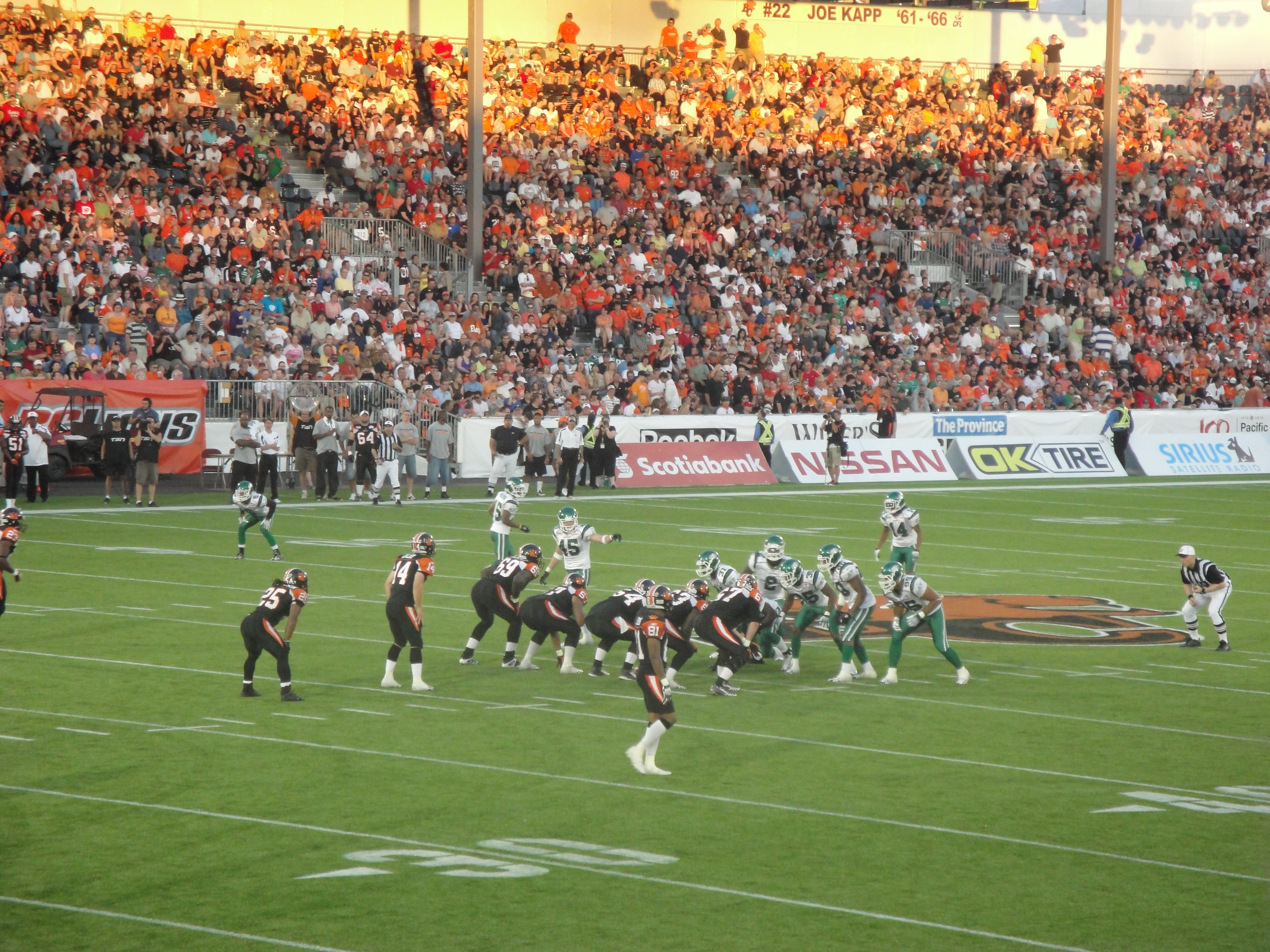
The Lions playing the Saskatchewan Roughriders in the field's first regular season game, on July 10, 2010

The stadium featured a seating capacity of 27,528, of which ca. 20,500 were bucket seats and ca. 7,000 were benches. The bucket seats were located under a roof, while there was no roof on the bench ends. In addition there are twelve executive boxes, a VIP zone, flood lighting and media facilities. Empire Field uses the FieldTurf artificial turf which was used at BC Place prior to the renovations. The venue was built so that it would not receive additional seating during playoffs. Lockers were located in construction trailers, with players having to pass through pedestrian traffic in the concourse to reach the lockers.

Compared to BC Place, Empire Field's seats were located closer to the field, giving a more intimate fan experience. The use of Empire Field deteriorated the Lions' strong home advantage. As BC Place was the only domed stadium in the CFL, its pressurized air made breathing more difficult, it had high summer night temperatures and a slight air flow which put off opposing kickers. The dome amplified the crowd, making team communication difficult. John Knox, president of the Vancouver Southsiders, described Empire as their ancestral home and that "it gave us a taste of the experience our parents and their parents had when going to matches in Vancouver."

TransLink served the stadium with the routes 28 and 135. On game days, the transit operator set up special buses which connected with the SkyTrain at Renfrew Station and 29th Avenue Station. Hastings Park is located on the Trans-Canada Highway. There are 1,300 parking spaces within a ten-minute walk from the stadium site. Several of these lots are offered with season parking tickets, which for 2010 cost $300. The stadium provided a free bicycle valet service. Compared to BC Place, which is located Downtown, Empire Field offered poor public transport service.

== Events ==
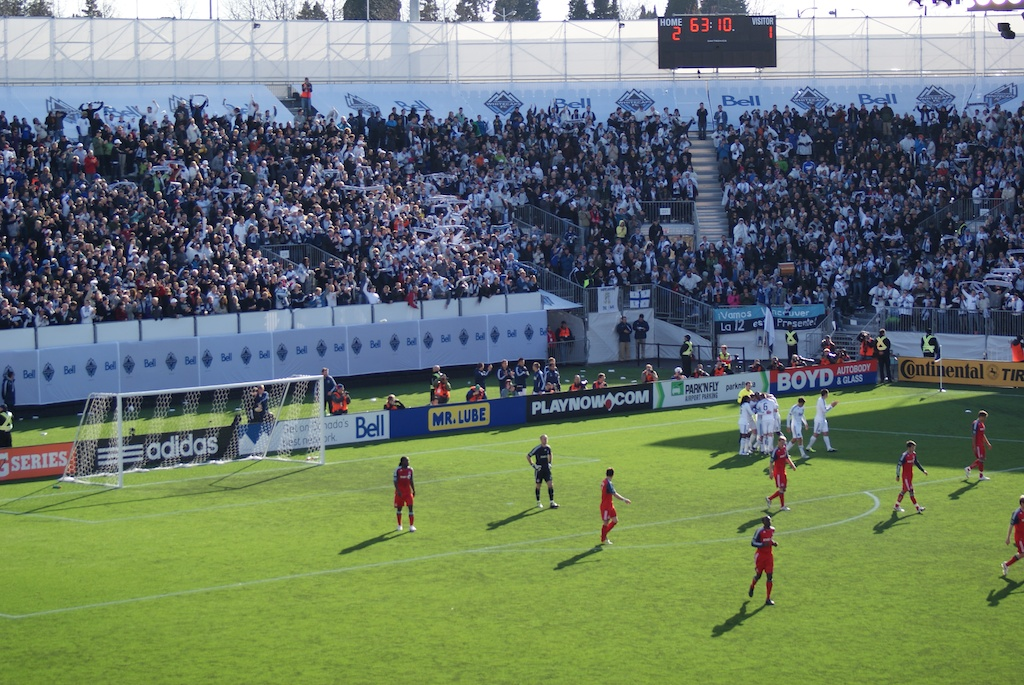
The Whitecaps during their debut game against Toronto FC on March 19, 2011

The Lions opened the venue on June 20, 2010, with a pre-season 36–32 loss against the Edmonton Eskimos, in front of a crowd of 24,763. In 2010, the team played one pre-season and nine regular-season games at the field. The team's highest attendance was the 29,517 spectators who watched the Saskatchewan Roughriders win 37–18 on July 10, in the first regular-season game to be played at Empire Field. The team drew an average attendance of 24,327 during the regular season, down 2,805 from 2009. During the 2011 season, the Lions played one pre-season and five regular-season games at Empire Field. For the regular season, the Lions drew an average 24,297 spectators, with a high of 25,263 seeing the Toronto Argonauts game on September 10, the last game played at Empire Field. This compared to an average attendance of 36,509 for the regular-season games at BC Place. The Lions' overall record at Empire Field was 5–10.

The Whitecaps, who would play their 2010 season in the USSF Division 2 Professional League, remained at Swangard Stadium for that season. The 2011 season was the franchise's debut in the MLS. The Caps' first game was a 4–2 victory over Toronto FC on March 19, in front of 22,592 spectators. The team played 13 of 17 MLS home games at Empire Field, in addition to both home games in the 2011 Canadian Championship and a friendly against Manchester City as part of the 2011 World Football Challenge. The Whitecaps' last game at Empire Field, a 3–1 loss to Seattle Sounders FC, took place on September 24. The first match at BC Place was played on October 2. The Caps had an average attendance of 20,577 for their 13 MLS games, with the Los Angeles Galaxy drawing a record high crowd of 27,500 and the San Jose Earthquakes drawing a record low crowd of 15,608. In comparison, the team's four games at BC Place drew an average 19,850 spectators. The Whitecaps' overall record for all games at Empire Field was 4–5–7. Braley stated that the temporary stadium cost the Whitecaps an estimated 1,600 season ticket sales and three major sponsors.

The stadium hosted a concert with Bryan Adams and The Beach Boys on August 21, 2010, to celebrate the centennial anniversary of PNE.
