= Creekway Park =

Park in Vancouver, Canada

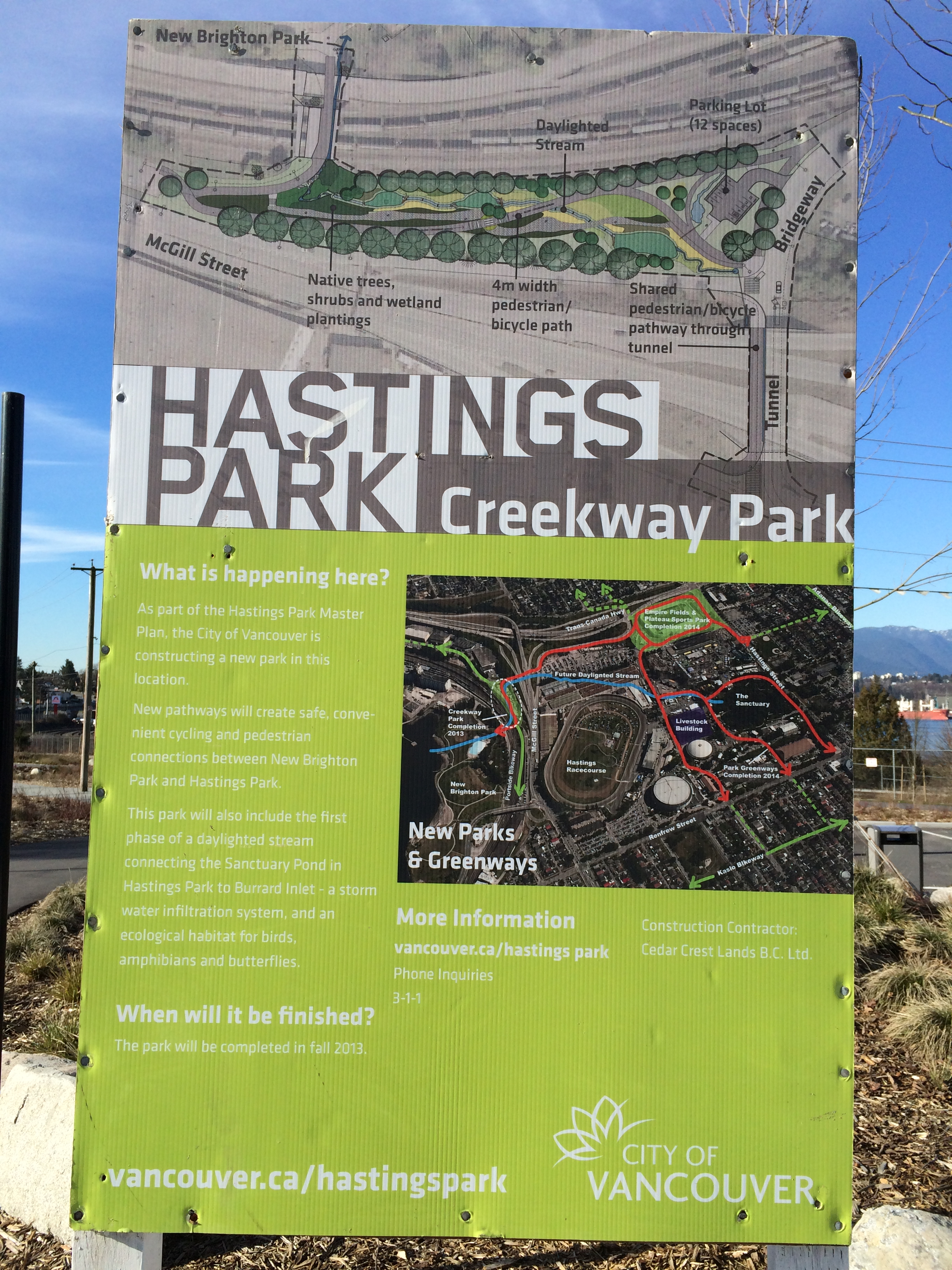
- Creekway Park development sign
- Interactive map of Creekway Park
- Type: daylighting habitat
- Location: Hastings-Sunrise
- Nearest city: Vancouver, British Columbia, Canada
- Coordinates: 49°17′18″N 123°02′03″W
- Created: September 2013

Creekway Park is a small daylighting habitat located in the Hastings-Sunrise area of Vancouver, British Columbia, Canada. The park, which is located at 2957 Bridgeway Street just southeast of New Brighton Park between McGill Street and the railway tracks, was completed in September 2013 as the first stage of the Vancouver City Council's plan to eventually connect New Brighton Park with Hastings Park.

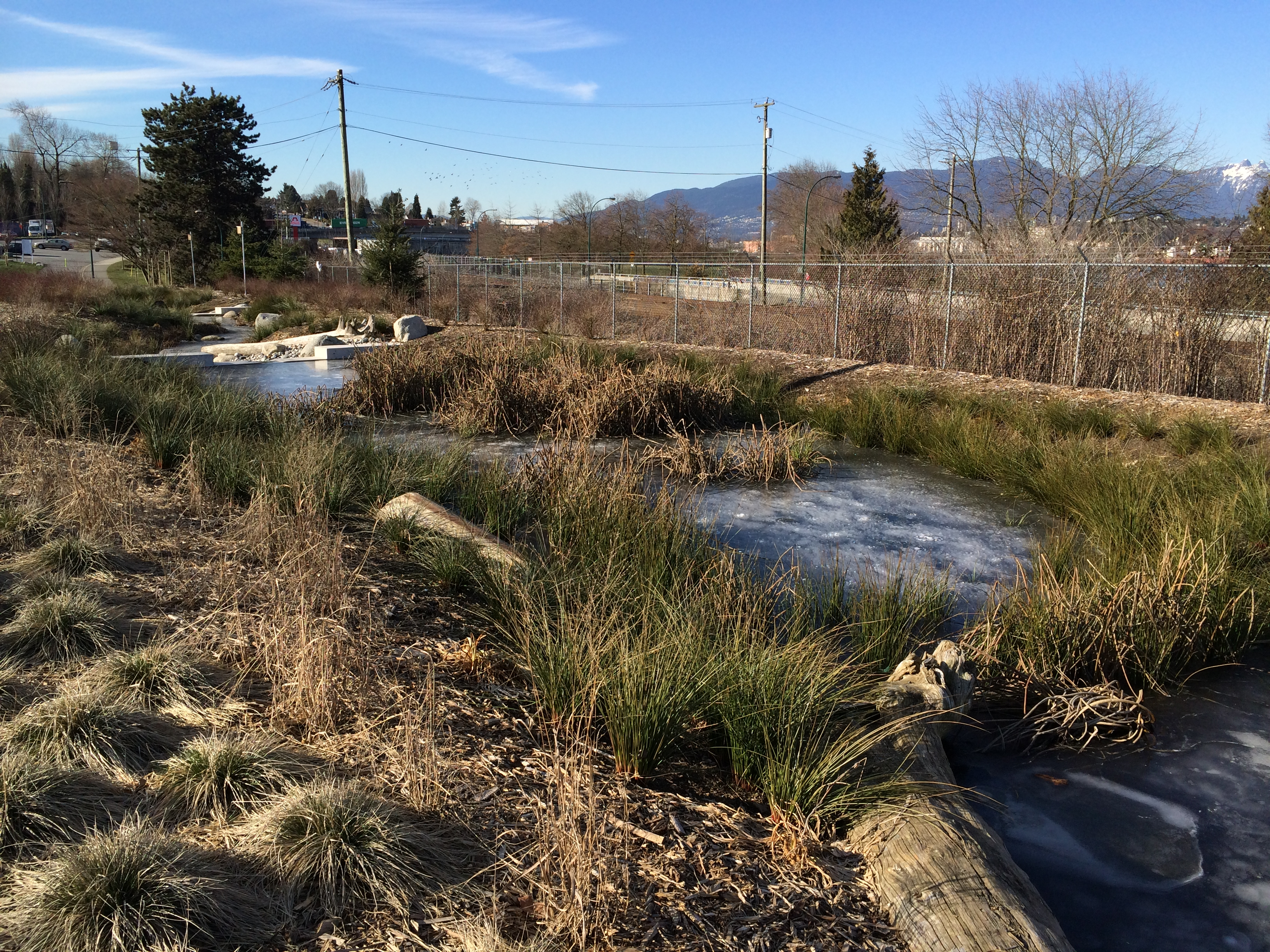
Creekway Park

This would provide a passage for water from the sanctuary at Hastings Park to the Burrard Inlet. Although the connection is not fully complete, Creekway Park still has a running stream with pedestrian and bicycle paths that connect to the Trans Canada Trail. Once the project has been fully completed, there will be a pathway between Hastings Park, Creekway Park, and New Brighton Park. This will also promote an urban habitat that supports all kinds of wildlife such as birds, fish, butterflies, and amphibians, as well as many native plant species.
