= Brighton Park =

Brighton Park may refer to:

- Brighton Park, Chicago, USA
  - Brighton Park crossing in Chicago
- New Brighton Park in Vancouver, Canada
- Queen's Park, Brighton, England
- Brighton Parks Police in England
- East Brighton Park in England
