= ThunderVolt =

Steel roller coaster at Playland PNE

- Previously known as Senzafiato (2009–2018) at Miragica

Playland
- Coordinates: 49.283924°N 123.035430°W
- Status: Operating
- Opening date: July 6, 2024; 2 years ago
- Cost: $10.5 million
- Replaced: Corkscrew
- ThunderVolt at Playland at RCDB

Miragica
- Coordinates: 41.212559°N 16.551045°E
- Status: Removed
- Opening date: April 3, 2009
- Closing date: 2018
- ThunderVolt at Miragica at RCDB

General statistics
- Type: Steel – Launched
- Model: Lightning Coaster
- Lift/launch system: LSM launch
- Height: 59.1 ft (18.0 m)
- Length: 1,246.7 ft (380.0 m)
- G-force: 1.3
- Height restriction: 52 in (132 cm)
- Trains: Single train with 3 cars; riders arranged 2 across in 2 rows for a total of 12 riders per train
- Website: Official website
- Original manufacturer: Intamin
- Redesigned by: Zamperla

ThunderVolt is a steel launched roller coaster located at Playland in Vancouver, British Columbia. It originally operated as Senzafiato at Italy's defunct Miragica theme park before being refurbished by Zamperla and constructed at Playland, where it opened as Canada's fastest launch coaster in July 2024.

== History ==
=== Miragica (2009 - 2018) ===
Miragica: Terra di Giganti ("Land of the Giants") was a theme park that operated from 2009 to 2018 in Molfetta, located in Southern Italy. A grand opening was held by operator Alfa Park Group on April 3, 2009, marking it as a part of a new tourism and commercial district. Although corporate ambitions were high, the park suffered noticeable deterioration throughout the years. The park failed to reopen for the 2019 season after Alfa Park – fueled by longtime operational losses and the Italian Economy's slip into recession – underwent liquidation and a financial restructuring, selling off their other theme park Rainbow MagicLand in the process. Miragica consequently remained abandoned, suffering through two fires and repeated efforts to auction off the property.

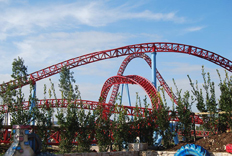
Senzafiato while at Miragica in Italy

Senzafiato (Italian for "Breathless") was the largest of two roller coasters located at Miragica; it was originally designed by Intamin and initially was assembled in May 2008. It was one of their final coasters to use a complex hydraulic launch system before the company fully moved towards linear motor technology. After the park's closure, Senzafiato was placed under the ownership of the leasing company and later sold to Zamperla for restoration; it was removed from the property in early 2022.

=== Relocation to Playland ===
Playland had previously retired their Corkscrew roller coaster in 2018 as they sought to prepare for an expansion of the park. On November 2, 2022, Playland PNE announced a brand new launched coaster for 2024, representing an investment of $9 million CAD and billed as the fastest of its kind in Canada. While it was quickly recognized as the former Senzafiato, Zamperla would be producing a complete replacement of its hardware; the lead car of its new train was unveiled at the IAAPA Expo in Orlando, Florida on November 15, 2022. Playland held a naming contest for the ride in March 2023, attracting more than 3,000 submissions; ThunderVolt was officially announced as the chosen term on November 22, 2023.

ThunderVolt's track and supports first began arriving at Playland in January 2023, with concrete footers being poured over the summer and assembly taking place during the Fall. Additionally in June, the Pacific National Exhibition was awarded $10-million CAD in expansion funding from the Pacific Economic Development Canada (PacifiCan), some of would be directed towards the coaster's construction.

Despite this, ThunderVolt's development faced various hurdles. In early 2023 it became apparent that the attraction's footprint conflicted with construction of the new PNE Amphitheatre. The decision was eventually made to shift the coaster approximately 10 metres (33 ft) northeast, necessitating additional piling work and increasing the budget by $1.5 million. A PNE press release later claimed that ThunderVolt's final budget had been raised further to $16 million. In May 2024, two months before ThunderVolt's targeted debut, Top Thrill 2 at Cedar Point in Sandusky, Ohio - a similar coaster refurbishment project that Zamperla had been working on concurrently - closed indefinitely for modifications after just days of operation. Despite questions raised concerning the hardware, ThunderVolt remained insulated and later officially opened to the public on July 6, 2024.

== Characteristics ==
ThunderVolt stands 59.1 feet (18.0 m) tall, has a track length of 1,246.7 feet (380.0 m), and achieves forces of 1.3 G's. Upon opening it was billed as Canada's fastest launch coaster, thus surpassing the previous 40 mph (64 km/h) speed held by Backlot Stunt Coaster at Canada's Wonderland; the title was relinquished back to said park upon AlpenFury's opening in 2025.

While at Miragica, Senzafiato – dubbed an Accelerator Coaster by Intamin – operated with a hydraulic launch system and single 3-car, 12-passenger train. When refurbishing the attraction, Zamperla swapped out the hardware with Linear Synchronous Motors (LSM's) for the new launch and their Lightning vehicle model for the train. The latter retains the original's capacity and features an aluminium-milled chassis without welds. During the refurbishment the coaster's red track and blue supports were repainted yellow and pink, respectively. In addition, an illuminated tunnel was built around the launch track.
