= New Brighton Park =

Park in British Columbia, Canada

Coordinates: 49.290°N 123.038°W

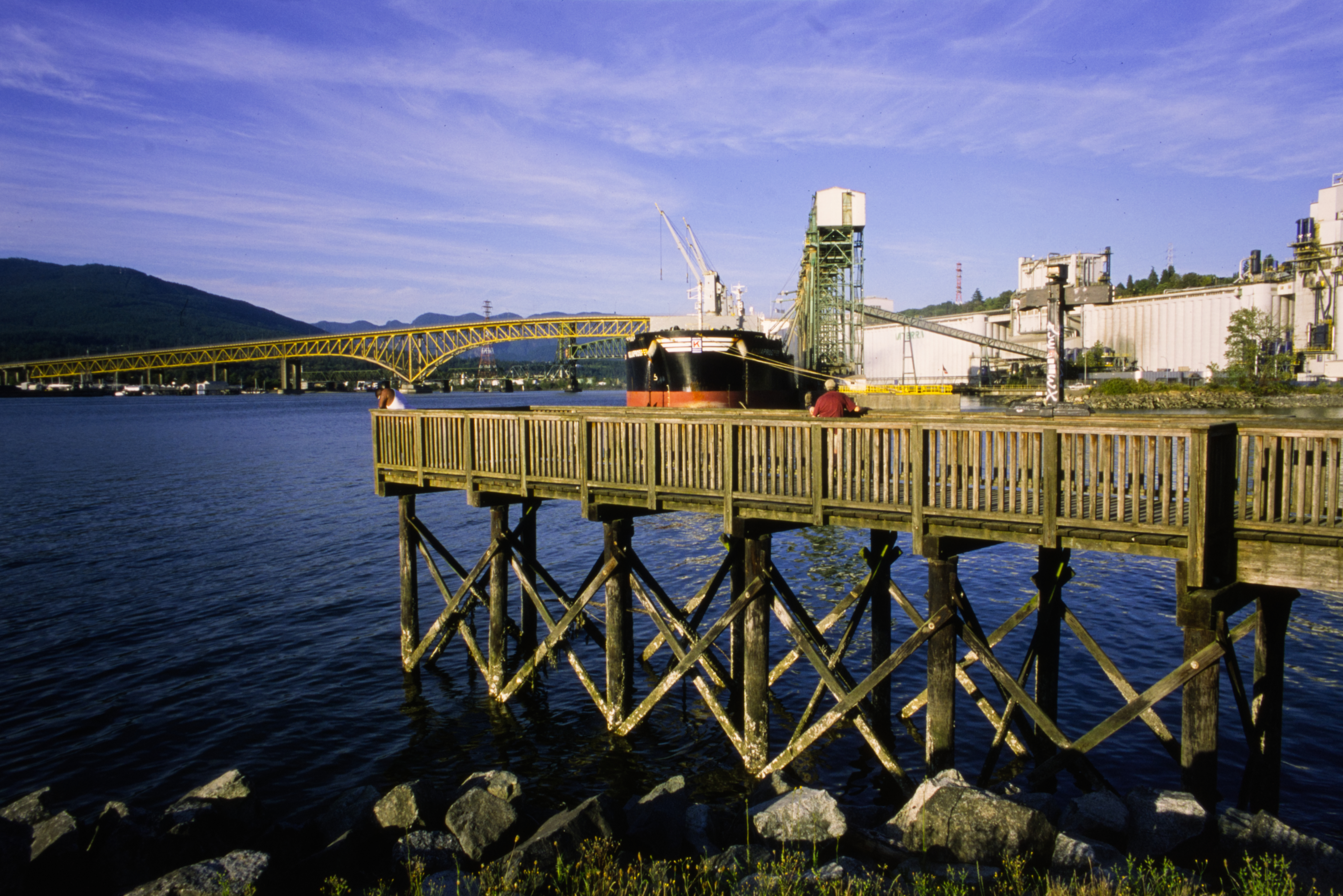
- Interactive map of New Brighton Park
- Type: Urban park
- Location: 3201 New Brighton Road, Vancouver, British Columbia, Canada
- Area: 10.0 hectares (0.100 km^{2}; 0.039 sq mi)
- Created: 1863
- Operator: Vancouver Park Board
- Website: https://covapp.vancouver.ca/ParkFinder/ParkDetail.aspx?InParkId=75

New Brighton Park is a waterfront park in the Hastings-Sunrise district of Vancouver, British Columbia, Canada, facing the North Shore Mountains with beach access to the Burrard Inlet. The park is surrounded by industrial plants, the Hastings Racecourse, as well as access to the Port of Vancouver. During the summer, the park becomes a popular location for recreational activity. There is a soccer pitch, barbecue/picnic sites, two playgrounds, beaches, an off-leash dog enclosure, and an outdoor pool. For local residents, New Brighton Park provides a nearby location with similar facilities found at other popular recreational parks such as Kitsilano Beach, which is located on the west side of Vancouver. New Brighton Park is also in the process of being connected to Hastings Park via Creekway Park, which will allow people to walk and cycle between the two locations.

== History ==
Before the arrival of Europeans and the establishment of Vancouver, New Brighton Beach was known as "Khanahmoot" in the Squamish language. It was known for its bountiful supply of shellfish, which were harvested by First Nations people for centuries.

New Brighton was previously known as Hastings Townsite back in 1865, and is considered to be the original area in which Vancouver began. To recognize the significance of this area, the City of Vancouver laid a plaque in 1968 indicating that this area was where the first outlets were established in the city. These outlets included the first post office, roads, playing field, Canadian Pacific Railway office, docks, and museum. The plaque also reads that Hasting Townsite was the most fashionable watering place in all of British Columbia. The plaque reads

Here Vancouver Began. All was forest towering to the skies. British Royal Engineers surveyed it into lots, 1863, and named the area "Hastings Townsite" to honour Admiral Hastings, British Navy. Everything Began at Hastings. The first post office, customs, road, bridge, hotel, stable, telegraph, dock, ferry, playing field, museum, C.P.R. offices. It was the most fashionable watering place in British Columbia. New Brighton Park. Retains the name of a hotel built here in 1880 known as the new "Brighton House".

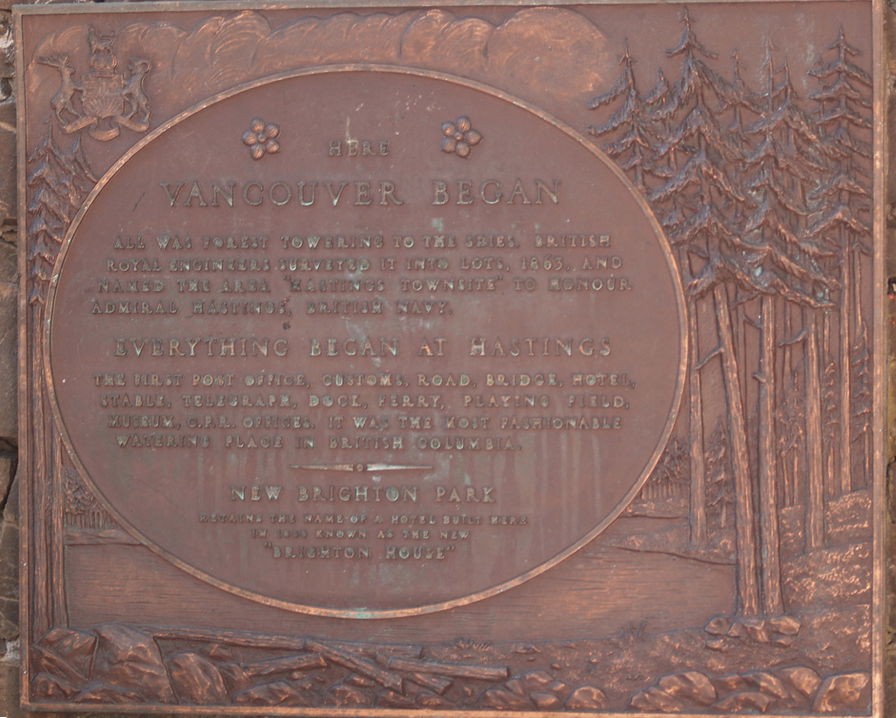
Plaque at New Brighton Park

Pools used the salt water from Burrard Inlet. Lumbermans Arch, 2nd Beach, and Windermere pool were all 1/2 circle concrete pools until the 1970s when they were converted to freshwater pools. These pools were all free to use until the conversions, when fees were introduced.

== New Brighton Pool ==
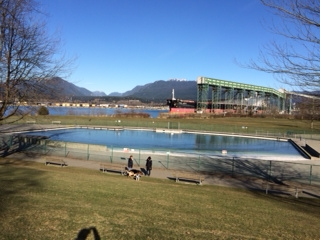
Pool at New Brighton Park

New Brighton Pool is a public outdoor pool that is usually open from May to September. The pool features 25-meter swim lanes as well as a sloped or beach style entry for young children, inexperienced swimmers, and visitors using wheelchairs. Lessons and classes are also available during the summer season.

== Sewage overflow ==
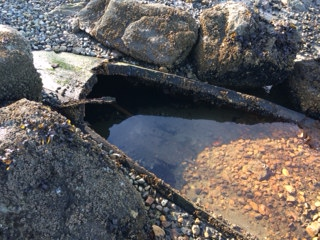
Sewage outflow pipe at low tide

New Brighton Park is one of the many locations in Vancouver, Burnaby, and New Westminster, that sewage outflow occurs. Vancouver's current sewage system was built in the 1960s and is organized so that sewage output is mixed with rainwater collecting systems. This is known as a combined sewer system. The reason for implementing such a system is that it is both cheaper to build and easier to maintain. Under normal circumstances this system is not an issue. However, when storms produce large amounts of rainwater the system overflows to nearby waterways. In most cases the piping is under water so that the public cannot see that sewage leaving, however, at New Brighton Park the piping is sometimes exposed at low tide.

There have recently been some concerns raised about this current system in Vancouver due to the effects of climate change. It is predicted that rainfall rates will increase in the lower mainland due to changes in climate and this could cause an increase in the amount of overflow water being routed to the ocean. For this reason, Vancouver has committed to the gradual change from a combined sewer system to a separated sewer system by 2050. This would mean that only excess rainwater collected from streets and houses would be directed towards the ocean and all sewage would be processed by sewage treatment plants.
