= Wooden Roller Coaster (Playland) =

Roller coaster in Vancouver

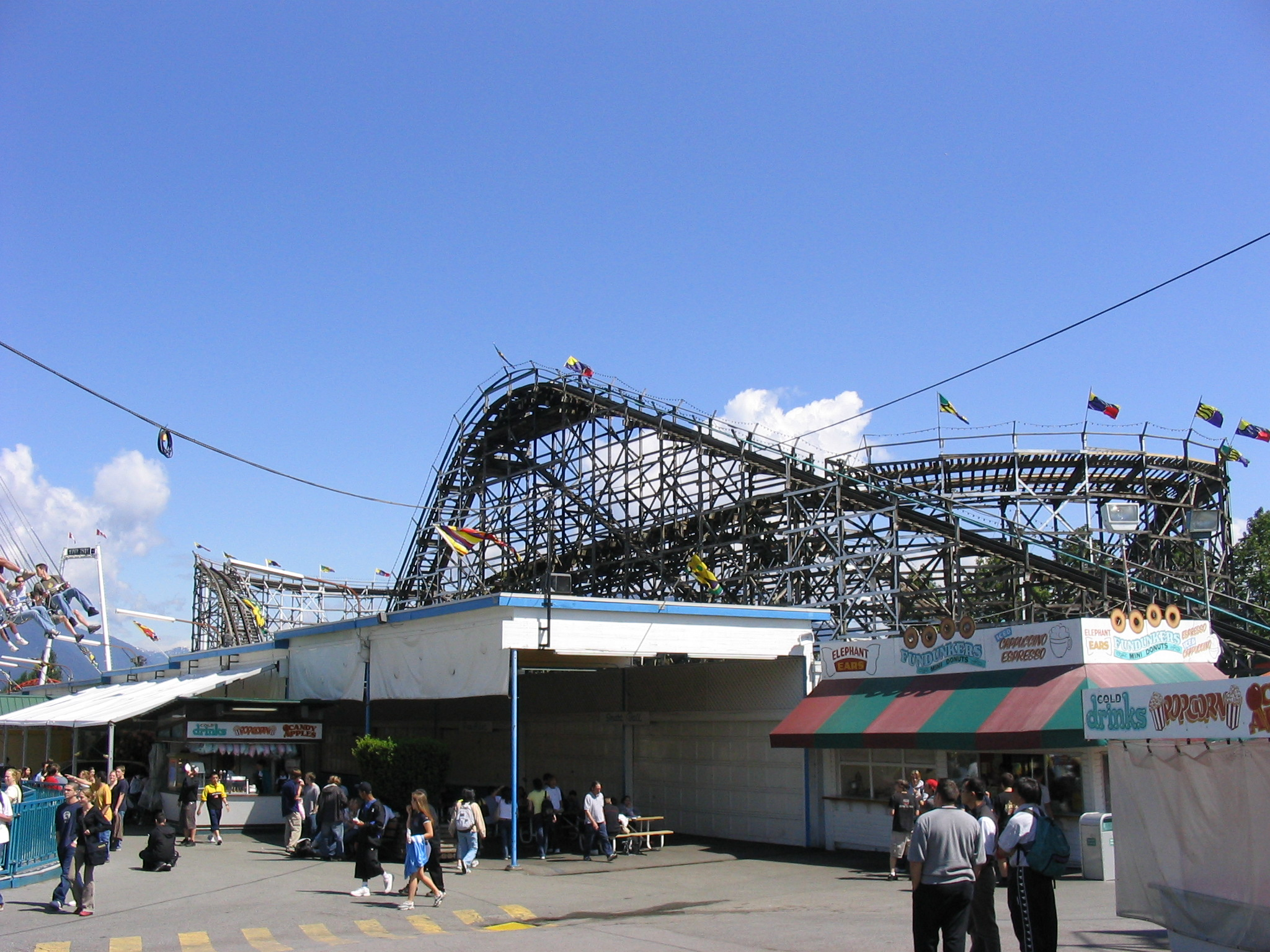

Playland
- Location: Playland
- Coordinates: 49.28245°N 123.03524°W
- Status: Operating
- Opening date: 1958
- Cost: $200,000

General statistics
- Type: Wood
- Designer: Carl Phare, Walker LeRoy
- Model: Twister
- Lift/launch system: Chain lift hill
- Height: 75 ft (23 m)
- Drop: 67 ft (20 m)
- Length: 2,840 ft (870 m)
- Speed: 45 mph (72 km/h)
- Inversions: 0
- Height restriction: 48 in (122 cm)
- Trains: 2 trains with 8 cars; riders arranged 2 across in a single row for a total of 16 riders per train
- Website: Official website
- Wooden Roller Coaster at RCDB

The PNE Roller Coaster is a wooden roller coaster at Playland in Vancouver, British Columbia, Canada. Opened in 1958, it is the oldest roller coaster in Canada. The ride is 2,840 ft (870 m) long—which established it as the largest roller coaster in Canada at the time it was completed—and has a height of 75 ft (23 m) and speeds of up to 45 mph (72 km/h). The coaster was awarded the Coaster Classic and Roller Coaster Landmark statuses by American Coaster Enthusiasts.

== History ==
The Wooden Roller Coaster opened in 1958. At the time, it cost over $200,000 to make, and was 40 cents for guests to ride. Designed by Carl Phare and Walker LeRoy, the ride was the final design of Phare's career, and is his only creation that is still standing.

== In film and television ==
The Coaster was featured in the 2004 horror movie Riding the Bullet and was the "Bullet". It also made a brief appearance in the 1996 teenage thriller Fear.

The Coaster was also featured in Final Destination 3, and in the background of the MacGyver episode “Brainwashed”

The Coaster is featured in the 2025 music video for KiiiKiii - "Strawberry Cheesegame"

== Awards ==
Golden Ticket Awards: Top wood Roller Coasters
Year									1998	1999
Ranking									22	20
Year	2000	2001	2002	2003	2004	2005	2006	2007	2008	2009
Ranking	22	23	–	24	31	29	28	29	31	26
Year	2010	2011	2012	2013	2014	2015	2016	2017	2018	2019
Ranking	26	34	29	30	37	30	30	39	42	32
Year	2020	2021	2022	2023	2024	2025	2026			
Ranking	N/A	34	29	30 (tie)	33	31	33			
