= Hastings Park =

Park in Vancouver, Canada

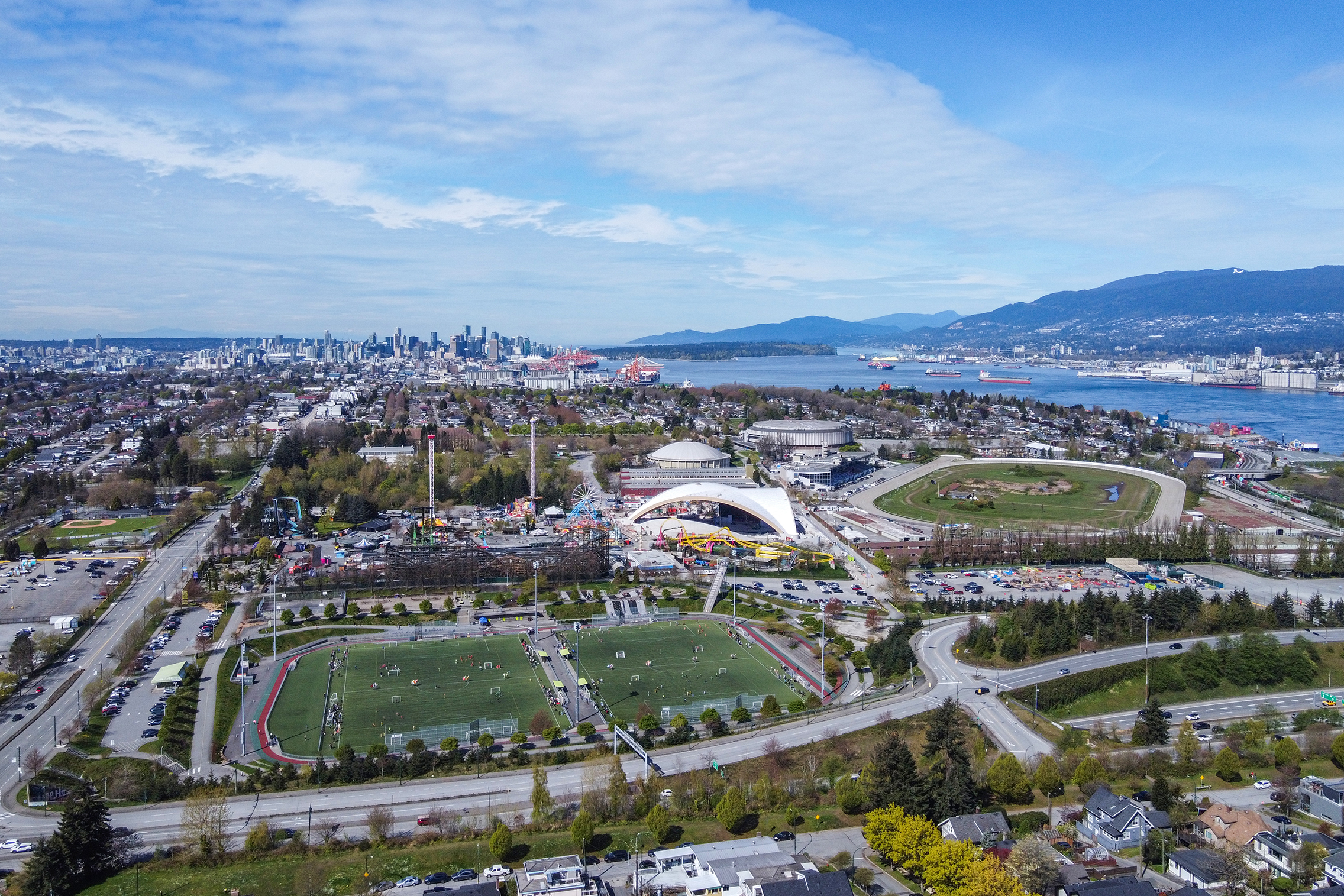
- Aerial view of Hastings Park (April, 2026)
- Interactive map of Hastings Park
- Type: Public Park
- Location: Vancouver, British Columbia
- Coordinates: 49.284°N 123.038°W
- Area: 62 hectares (150 acres)
- Created: 1888
- Operator: City of Vancouver

Hastings Park is a municipal park located in the northeast sector of Vancouver, British Columbia, Canada, in the Hastings-Sunrise neighbourhood. The 62 hectares (150 acres) park features several sports and recreation facilities, including Hastings Racecourse and Playland amusement park. The southern portions of the park are also used as the fairgrounds for the Pacific National Exhibition.

The park was granted in trust by the government of British Columbia to the City of Vancouver. Horse racing first took place at the park in 1892, with the PNE holding its first exhibition in 1910. An amusement park was opened at Hastings Park in 1926.

In 2025, a soccer-specific stadium, which will serve as the home of Vancouver Whitecaps FC, an MLS club, has been provisionally approved for construction at the site. The agreement will still need to be approved by the Vancouver City Council.

== Etymology ==
Its name references the Hastings Townsite, part of which was also known as New Brighton, which lay at the end of the Douglas Road from New Westminster, founded as a resort and watering-hole and as a port to connect the other settlements of the inlet—Gastown, Moodyville and Barnet—to the city.

== History ==
The land was originally granted in trust to the city by the Province in 1888 as part of the will of its late owner, with the site to be kept in perpetuity as wilderness park for public use. However, throughout most of the twentieth century, Hastings Park has been home to two institutions: the Pacific National Exhibition (PNE) and the Hastings Racecourse, and the PNE's amusement park, Playland. Over the years, the site lost its park character because of the construction of many buildings and parking lots. These included the long-vanished Exhibition Building, a Mission-style affair with ornate cupolas and decor, torn down by the 1920s due to structural inefficiencies. In its place three large art deco concrete buildings and one smaller one - the Showmart, Food Building and Forum and the Gardens, respectively.

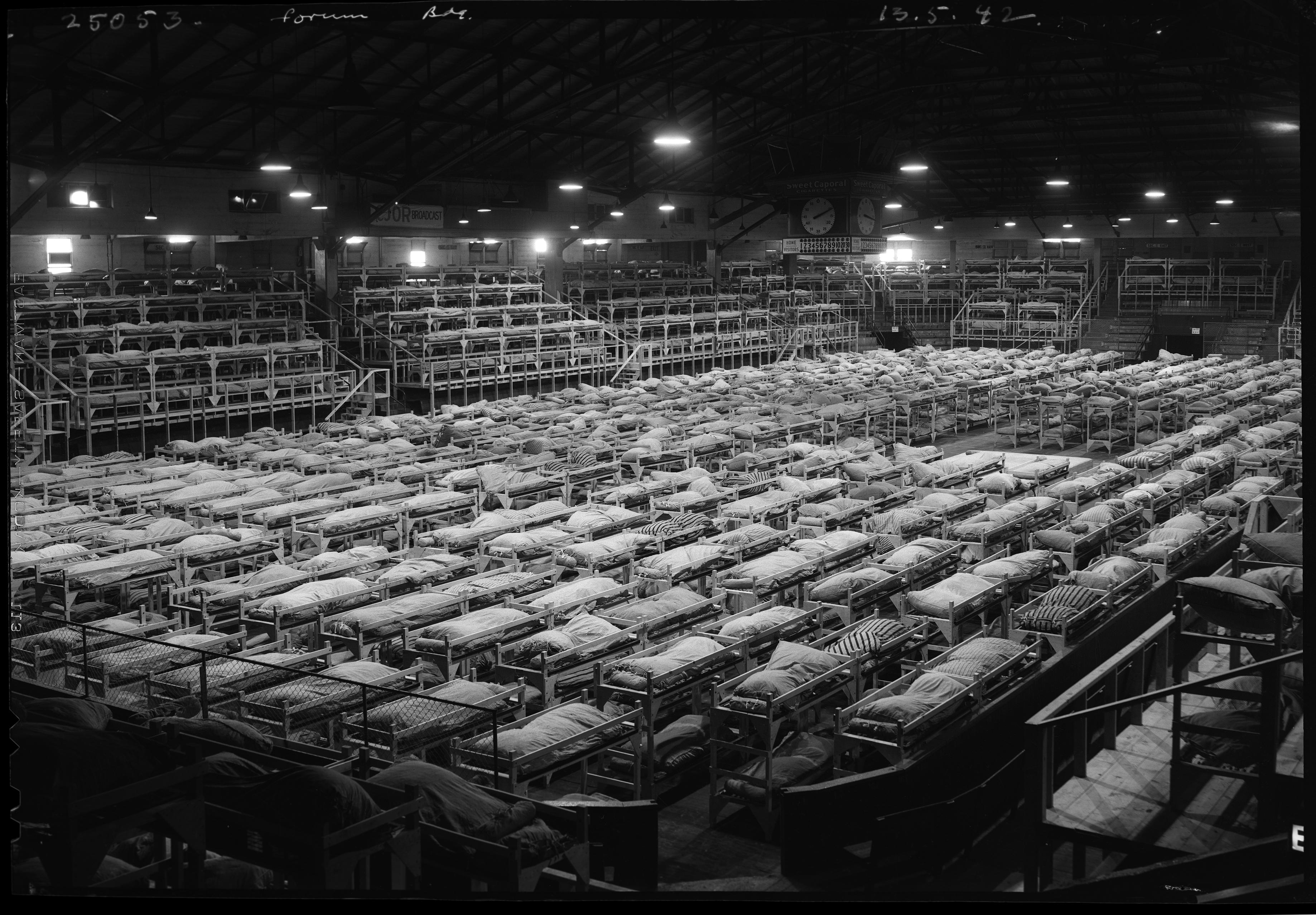
Dormitories at the forum in Hastings Park. The park was used to house Japanese Canadians who were being processed for internment.

Following Canada's declaration of war on Imperial Japan in 1942, Hastings Park was used to house and process Japanese Canadians before being sent to internment camps in the interior of British Columbia.

Over time PNE facilities grew in the post-war period by the addition of the BC Building, housing the once-famous Challenger Relief Map of British Columbia and the Agrodome, plus the regular expansion of buildings and structures in Playland, most visibly its roller coaster, prominent on the eastern approach into the city via Hastings Street and via Highway 1, but also a vintage games arcade and electric bumper-car "rink". Next to it, in time for the British Empire Games hosted by Vancouver in 1954, was Empire Stadium, its concrete stands now a community track and sport facility. Added still later was the Pacific Coliseum, the park's largest single structure and for many years the city's largest indoor sports and entertainment venue (with Empire Stadium being the largest outdoor). Operations at the racecourse also expanded over times, with an extensive collection of horse barns and horse-trailer parking lots.

A Restoration Plan was prepared with the neighbourhood residents and approved by the City in 1997.

The site was used during the 2026 FIFA World Cup, hosting the Vancouver FIFA Fan Festival.

== Grounds ==
=== Facilities ===
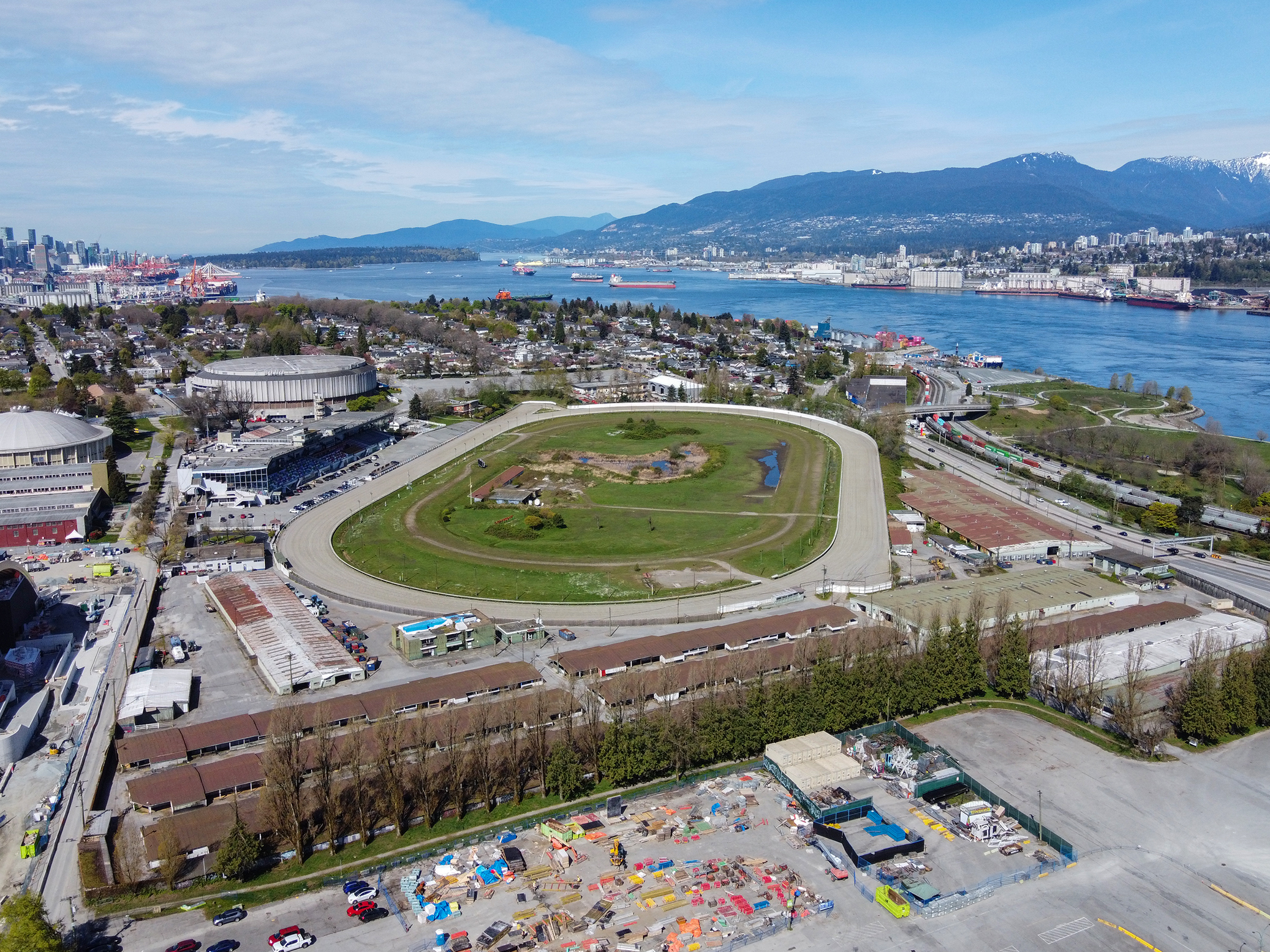
View of the track for Hastings Racecourse

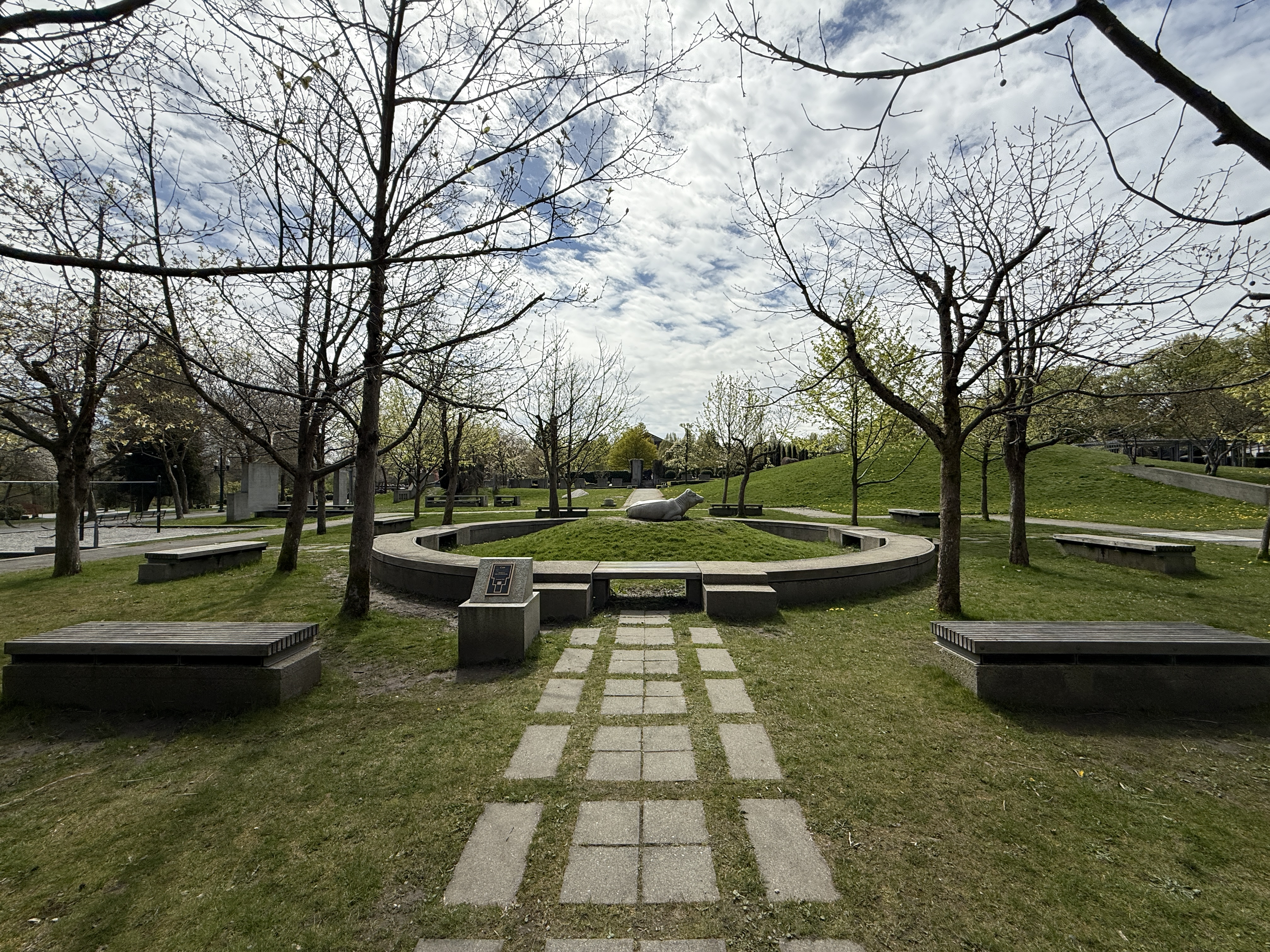
Italian Garden

- Freedom Mobile Arch
- Hastings Racecourse
- Livestock barns (used in the Japanese Canadian internment in the 1940s)
- Pacific Coliseum
- Playland (Vancouver)
- PNE Agrodome
- PNE Garden Auditorium
- Rollerland
- Vancouver Forum

==== Demolished buildings ====
- BC Pavilion (now the site of the Sanctuary Pond)
- Empire Field (demolished after renovations of BC Place)
- Empire Stadium

=== Sanctuary ===
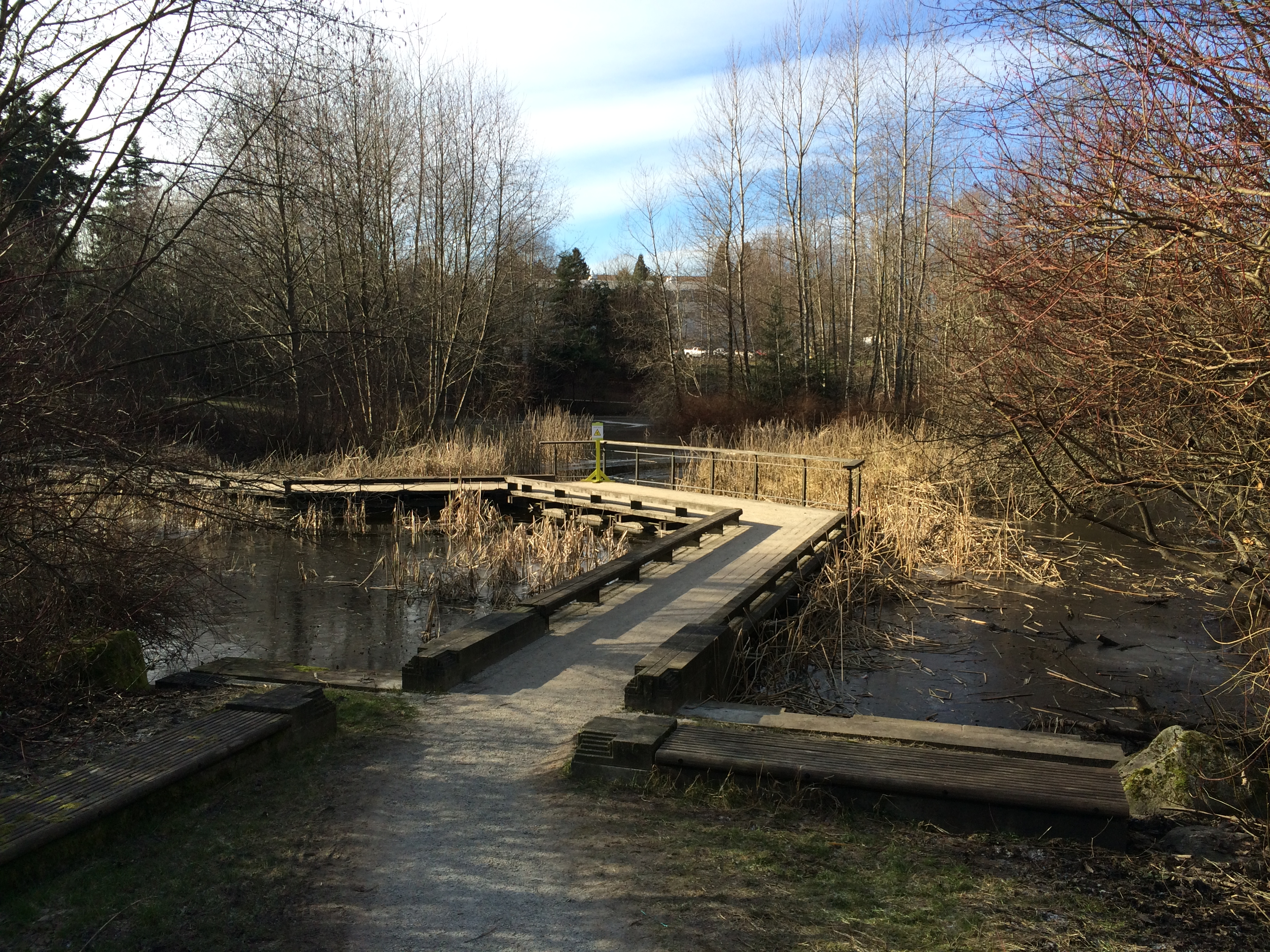
The Sanctuary boardwalk

The sanctuary at Hastings Park was one of the many developments made between 1997 and 2001 in order to improve the facilities associated with the park. Within the sanctuary is a large pond surrounded by native plants and walkways. The sanctuary also supports many species of birds and small animals. Furthermore, the pond is stocked with rainbow trout that can be fished for off of a small dock at the northwest corner of the pond.

The Creekway Park is a daylighted stream that will connect the sanctuary to New Brighton Park. This project, which completed its first stage in September 2013, also includes new pedestrian and bicycle pathways between the two parks as well as providing an ecological corridor to the Burrard Inlet. The sanctuary area of the park continues to be developed.
