= Corkscrew (Playland) =

Roller coaster

- Previously known as Screamer at Boblo Island Amusement Park (1985–1993)
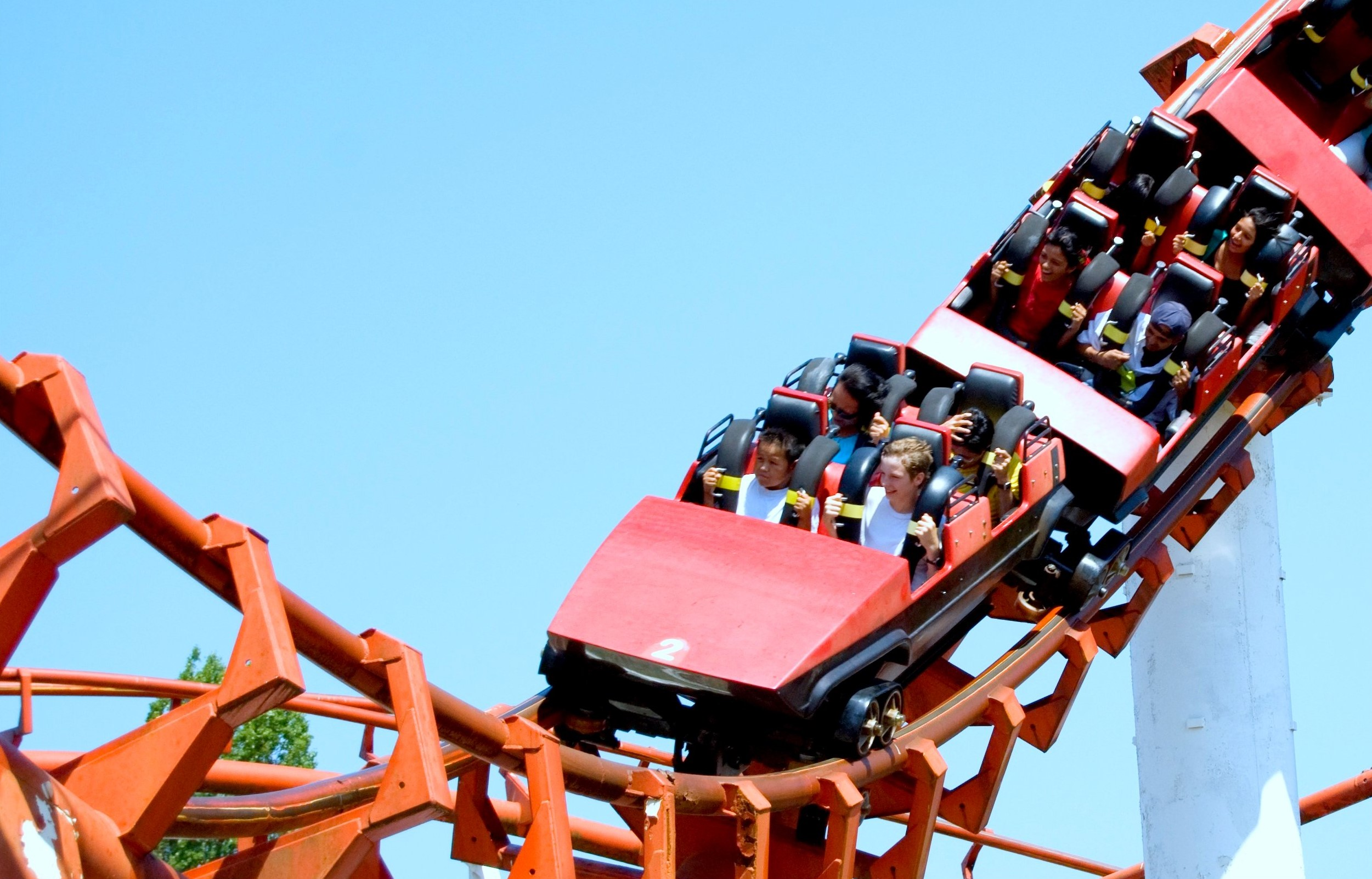

Playland
- Coordinates: 49.283890°N 123.035719°W
- Status: Removed
- Opening date: 1994
- Closing date: 2018
- Replaced by: ThunderVolt

Boblo Island Amusement Park
- Name: Screamer
- Coordinates: 42°05′42.2″N 83°07′14.4″W
- Status: Removed
- Opening date: 1985
- Closing date: 1993

General statistics
- Type: Steel
- Manufacturer: Vekoma
- Model: Corkscrew with Bayerncurve
- Height: 75 ft (23 m)
- Drop: 68 ft (21 m)
- Length: 2,400 ft (730 m)
- Speed: 40 mph (64 km/h)
- Inversions: 2
- Duration: 1:29
- Height restriction: 48 in (122 cm)
- Corkscrew at RCDB

Corkscrew was a steel roller coaster located at the "Playland At the PNE" amusement park in Vancouver, British Columbia, Canada. It appeared in the 2006 film Final Destination 3 (known in the movie as Devil's Flight), the 2012 motion picture Diary of a Wimpy Kid: Dog Days, as well as the television series Smallville ("Magnetic" in season three). It also makes a background appearance in Season 4, Episode 16 of the tv show Psych.

The bonus disc of the Final Destination 3 DVD set includes behind-the-scenes footage shot on and around the coaster, documenting the challenges involved in shooting the scenes.

As of March 2019, it was no longer listed on the park’s website and has been sold to an unannounced purchaser. Following its closure, it was dismantled by Clearview Demolition Ltd. and removed from the site to make room for Playland's planned renovation and expansion.

== History ==
The Dutch manufacturer Vekoma originally built the ride in 1985 (which was named Screamer) for Boblo Island Amusement Park in Amherstburg, Ontario, Canada. The corkscrew coaster was introduced by Arrow Dynamics in 1975 with a roller coaster that now operates at Silverwood in Idaho. Several models can be found throughout the world, some with additional inversions such as a vertical loop.
