= Vancouver Southsiders =

Canadian Major League Soccer supporters group

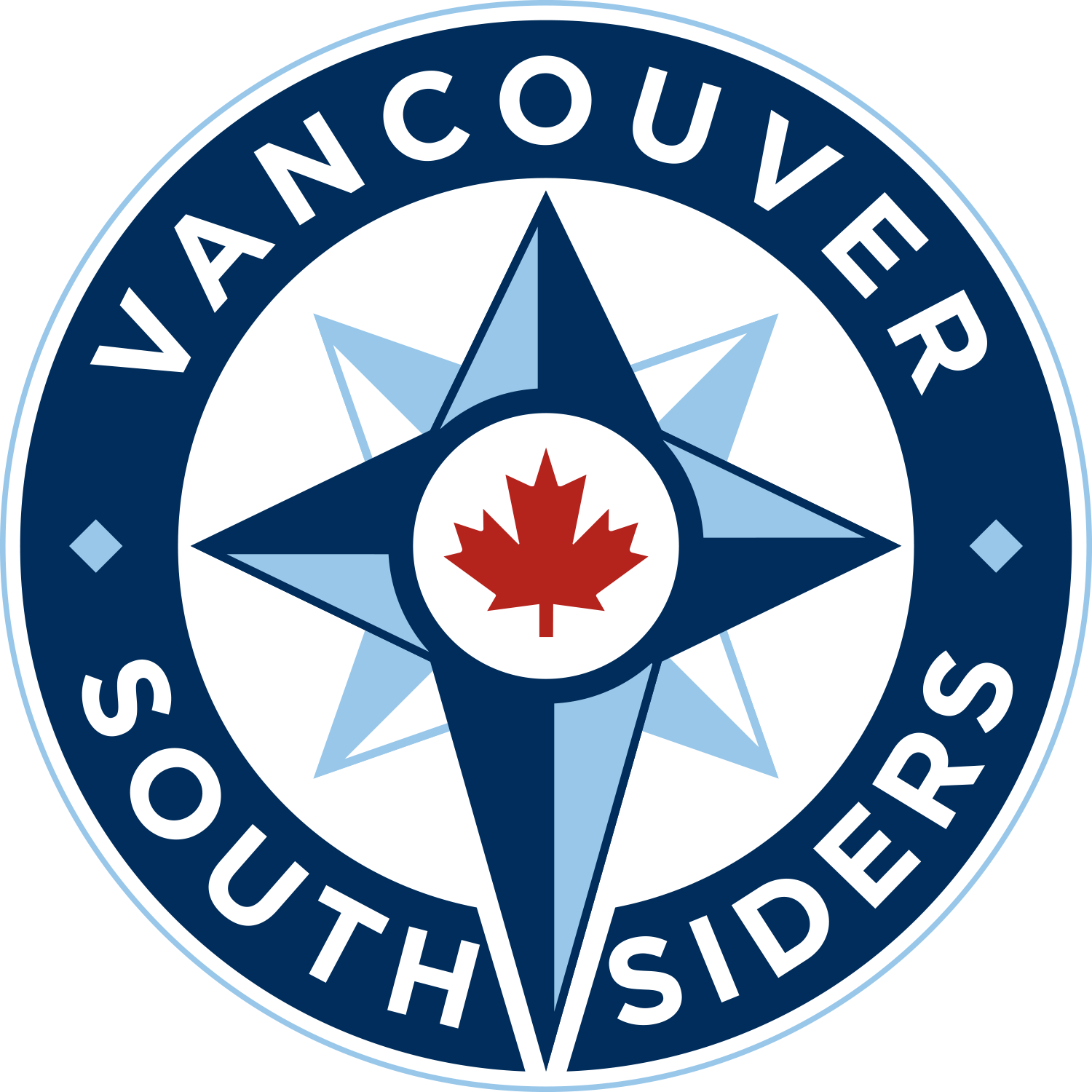
- Established: 1999
- Type: Supporters' group
- Club: Vancouver Whitecaps FC
- Motto: Up the f*cking Southside
- Location: Vancouver, BC
- Website: Vancouver Southsiders

The Vancouver Southsiders are an independent supporters group for Vancouver Whitecaps FC of Major League Soccer. The group was founded in 1999 to support the Vancouver 86ers who were then competing in the USL D2 Pro League.

The name Southsiders refers to the south side of Swangard Stadium, where the group first gathered to support the team.

Following the Whitecaps’ entry into Major League Soccer in 2011 and the team’s move to BC Place, the Southsiders relocated to Section 251-254, where they continue to lead organized support on matchdays.

== History ==
The group began in 1999 when supporters of the Vancouver 86ers started gathering in the pitch-level beer garden behind the goal at the south end of Swangard Stadium. The supporters initially referred to themselves as the “Carlsberg Crew,” a reference to the beer garden’s sponsor, Carlsberg.

The following season, after the stadium’s beer sponsorship changed, the group adopted the name “Canterbury Chorus.” To avoid repeatedly changing names with future sponsorship changes, the supporters later adopted the more permanent name “Southsiders,” referencing their location on the south side of the stadium.

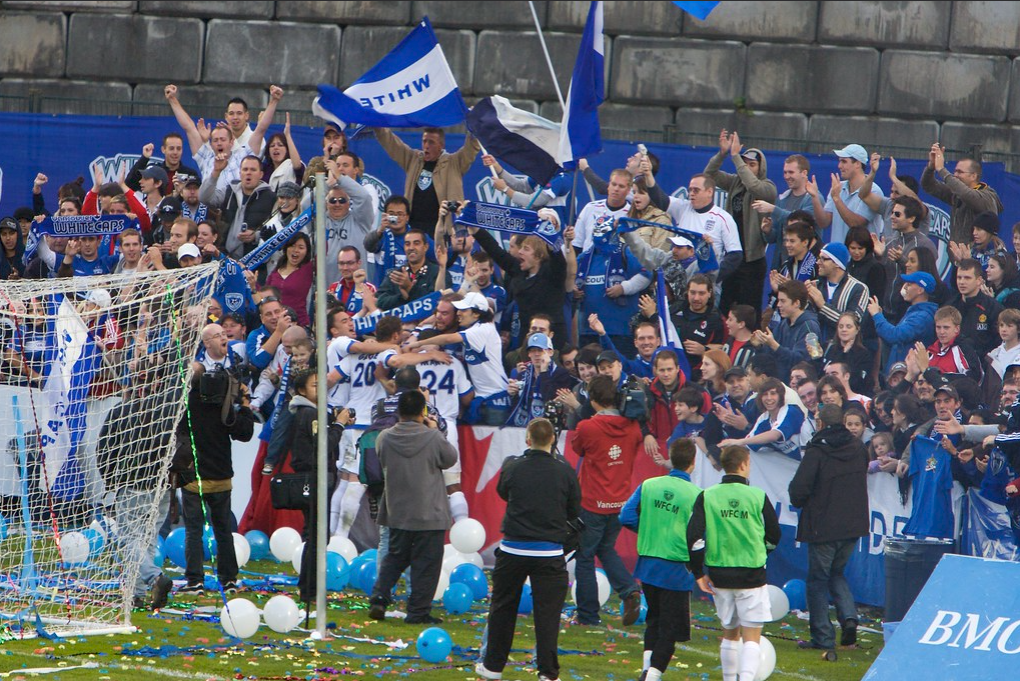
Vancouver Southsiders at Swangard Stadium

In 2004, the Southsiders collaborated with supporters’ groups from Portland Timbers and Seattle Sounders FC to establish the Cascadia Cup. The supporter-created trophy is awarded annually to the team that earns the most points in league matches played between the three Pacific Northwest clubs.

John Knox, then president of the Southsiders, described the Cascadia Cup as “hugely important.”

=== MLS Era ===
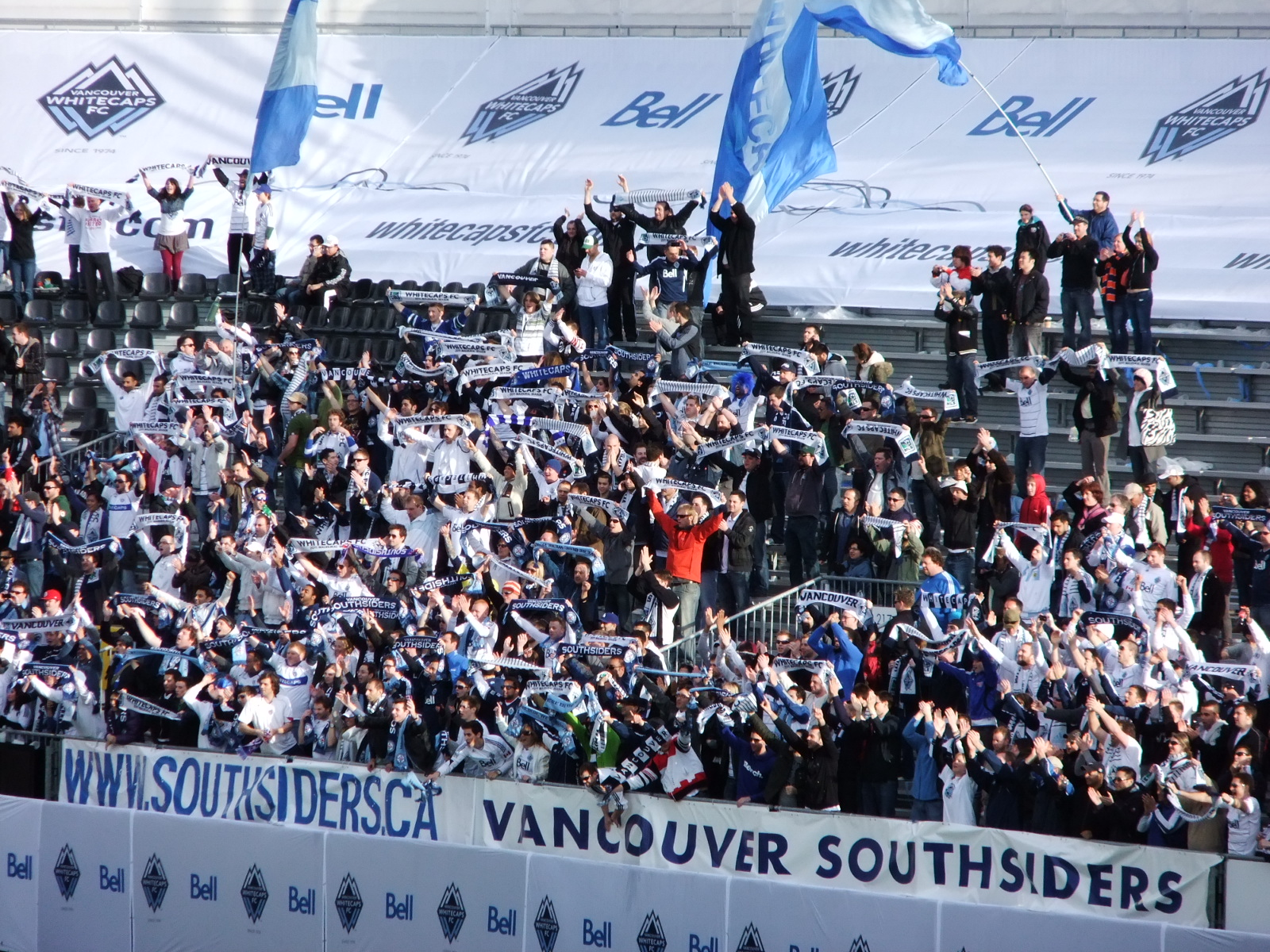
Vancouver Southsiders in 2011 at Empire Field

In 2010, following the Whitecaps’ expansion into Major League Soccer, Southsiders membership increased significantly. The group grew from approximately 40 paying members to around 100 by July of that year. By the end of 2011, membership had surpassed over 700.

During the renovation of BC Place between 2010 and 2011, Vancouver Whitecaps FC temporarily played their home matches at Empire Field. During this period, the Southsiders gathered in the south end of the stadium.

Following the completion of renovations at BC Place and the club’s move into Major League Soccer in 2011, the Southsiders relocated to the south-east end, establishing a dedicated GA supporters’ section that has remained the group’s primary location for organized support.

=== Decline and revival ===
By the late 2010s, Southsiders membership remained relatively stable but began to gradually decline amid a series of controversies surrounding Vancouver Whitecaps FC and tensions within the broader supporter culture. In 2019, members of the group organized in-stadium protests, including coordinated walkouts during matches, in response to misconduct allegations connected to the club’s former women’s program and other front-office decisions.

In 2020, the Southsiders were granted a dedicated general admission section at BC Place in section 254. The section provided a fully unified space for organized support, allowing supporters to stand together, coordinate chants, and create a more traditional football supporters’ environment.

Membership declined further during the COVID-19 pandemic, when matches were played without supporters or under significant attendance restrictions. During this period, active membership reportedly fell to around 100.

As restrictions eased and the Whitecaps’ on-field performance improved in the early 2020s, membership began to recover steadily. By the mid-2020s, the group’s membership had rebounded to more than 500 members.

With the Whitecaps sustained success beginning in 2025, the supporters section has grown alongside the overall attendance numbers. The Southsiders make up the largest portion, alongside the other official supporters groups, the Rain City Brigade, the Sisters and the Coastal Guardians.

The Southsiders have spearheaded the #SavetheCaps movement, an online and on the ground campaign to stop the sale and relocation of the Whitecaps, a topic which came to the forefront in 2026.

== Culture ==
The Southsiders are known for organizing coordinated matchday support for Vancouver Whitecaps FC, including chants, songs, flags, drums, and tifo displays. Much of the group’s activity centers on building atmosphere within the supporters’ section at BC Place.

Before each home match, the group organizes a “March to the Match,” beginning at Dublin Calling, a pub in downtown Vancouver that serves as a regular pre-match gathering point for supporters. Fans assemble at the pub before marching together along Robson Street toward BC Place while singing chants and carrying flags. The march typically attracts large numbers of supporters and has become a visible matchday tradition for the club. The Southsiders perform a variety of chants and songs that reference the team’s history and local identity. One of the group’s most recognizable songs is “Boundary Road,” sung to the tune of John Denver's "Take Me Home, Country Roads, which is sung at the beginning of each match and references the road where Swangard Stadium—the former home of the Vancouver 86ers—is located. Another tradition occurs in the 86th minute of matches, when supporters sing “Eight Six,” a chant sung to the tune of Hey Jude by The Beatles, in recognition of the club’s earlier identity as the Vancouver 86ers.

Boundary Road, take me home,
To the place where I belong.
Vancouver, pretty mama,
Take me home, Boundary road.
