= Playland (Vancouver) =

Amusement park in Vancouver, BC

Playland Amusement Park
- Previously known as Happyland (1929–1957)
- Interactive map of Playland Amusement Park
- Location: Vancouver, British Columbia, Canada
- Coordinates: 49.2827°N 123.0366°W
- Status: Operating
- Opened: 1929; 97 years ago (Note: The year 1929 was when Happyland amusement park was fully opened at Hastings Park. Happyland was later demolished and the amusement park was moved to its current location, renamed Playland, in 1958.)
- Owner: Pacific National Exhibition (Note: The Pacific National Exhibition is an organization managed by the City of Vancouver.)
- Slogan: Come and join the fun!
- Operating season: May–September
- Attendance: 378,000 (Note: From 2010 to 2018, the park averaged 378,000 guests annually, with 300,000 guests visiting during its regular season, and 78,000 visiting during the parks "Fright Nights" in October.)
- Area: 6.1 hectares (15 acres)

Attractions
- Total: 40
- Roller coasters: 4
- Water rides: 1
- Website: www.pne.ca/playland/

Playland Amusement Park is an amusement park in Vancouver, British Columbia, Canada. The amusement park is located at Hastings Park and is operated by the Pacific National Exhibition (PNE), an organization that hosts an annual summer fair and exhibition adjacent to Playland. Playland opened at its current location in 1958, although its predecessor, Happyland, operated at Hastings Park from 1929 to 1957 on the opposite end of the property. Playland was formally made a division of the PNE in 1993.

Playland operates seasonally, opening from May to September every year. The park also reopens in October for its annual "Fright Nights" Halloween themed events. As of 2024, the park operated 40 attractions, including 4 roller coasters. Additional rides are brought in from West Coast Amusements during the PNE's annual summer fair from mid-August to Labour Day; nearly doubling the number of rides at the park.

== History ==
=== Predecessor ===
The Pacific National Exhibition (PNE) has hosted a number of amusement rides since it opened in 1910; with an early roller coaster installed in 1915. However, a permanent amusement complex was not built until the 1920s. Built at Hastings Park, several rides were opened by 1926, including a Shoot the Chute ride and a new roller coaster, the Giant Dipper, to replace the one built in 1915.

Although the first rides were opened by 1926, Playland's predecessor, Happyland, did not fully open for its first regular season until 1929. Happyland was operated by several companies while it was open, including the British Columbia Amusement Company; and the Pacific Amusement Company. The park continued to operate until 1957, when amusement park operations were moved to its present location (on the opposite end of the property, where it remains today). The original site was demolished after the amusement park's relocation; with the site later being used for Pacific Coliseum.

=== Playland ===
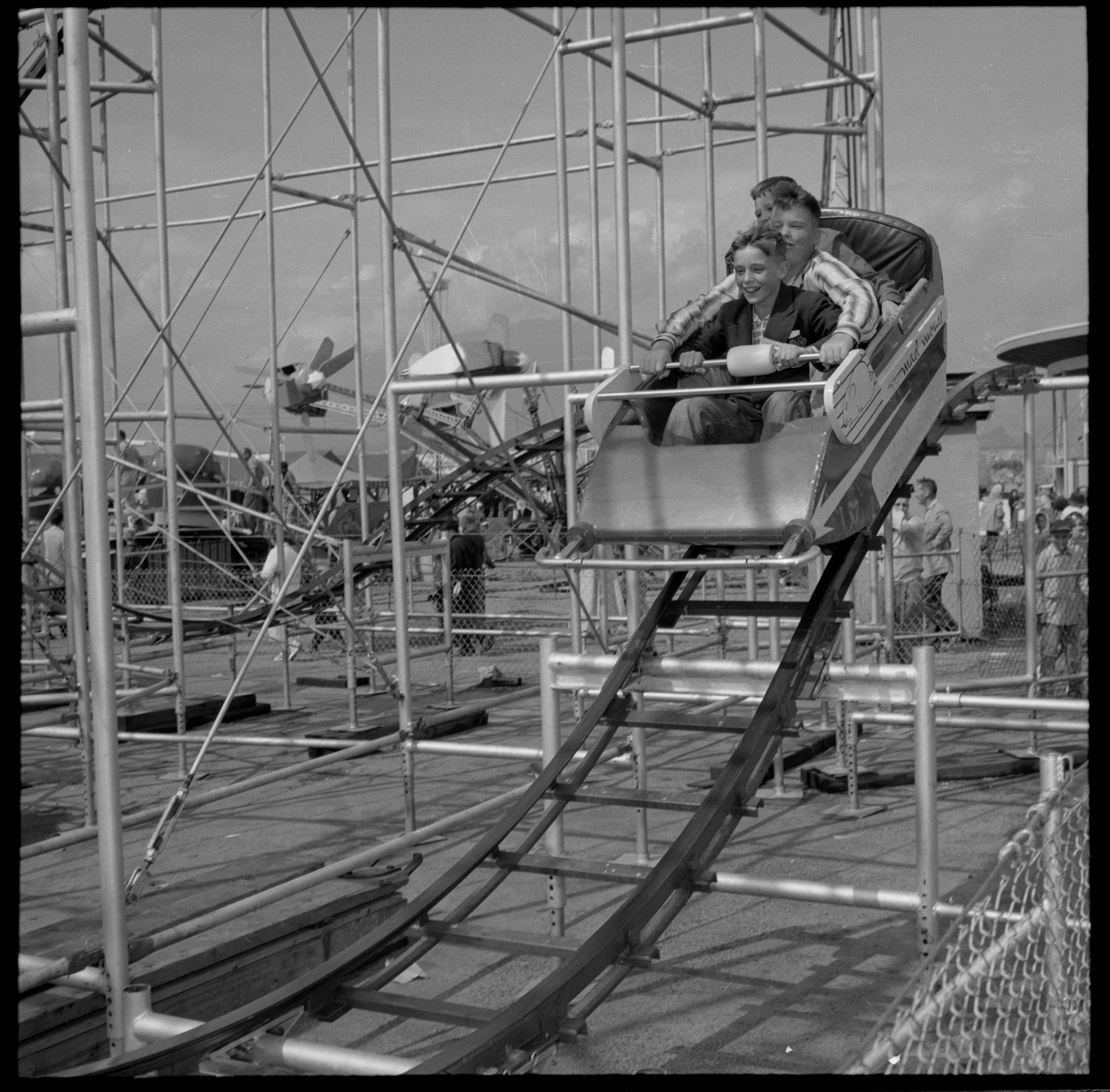
A rollercoaster at Playland in 1960, two years after Playland was opened to the public

Construction for the modern amusement park occurred from December 1957 to 1958, with the park opening in time for that year's PNE exhibition. Reopened as Playland, the park featured several new attractions including the Wooden Roller Coaster, the country's largest at the time of its opening.

Although it was located adjacent to the PNE's fairgrounds, the amusement park did not formally become a division of the Pacific National Exhibition until January 1993.

In 2001, the park began operating Halloween-themed events or "Fright Nights" during the month of October. During this time, haunted houses are set up inside the amusement park and employed monsters are roaming the park scaring patrons. Most of the parks regular amusement rides are in operation. The haunted houses have been owned and managed by ScreamWorks Inc., a Calgary-based company. Fright Nights event and its including the haunted houses were managed by the PNE and Playland beginning in 2009.

In 2009, the Wooden Roller Coaster was designated with "classic" and "landmark" status by the American Coaster Enthusiasts.

== Attractions ==
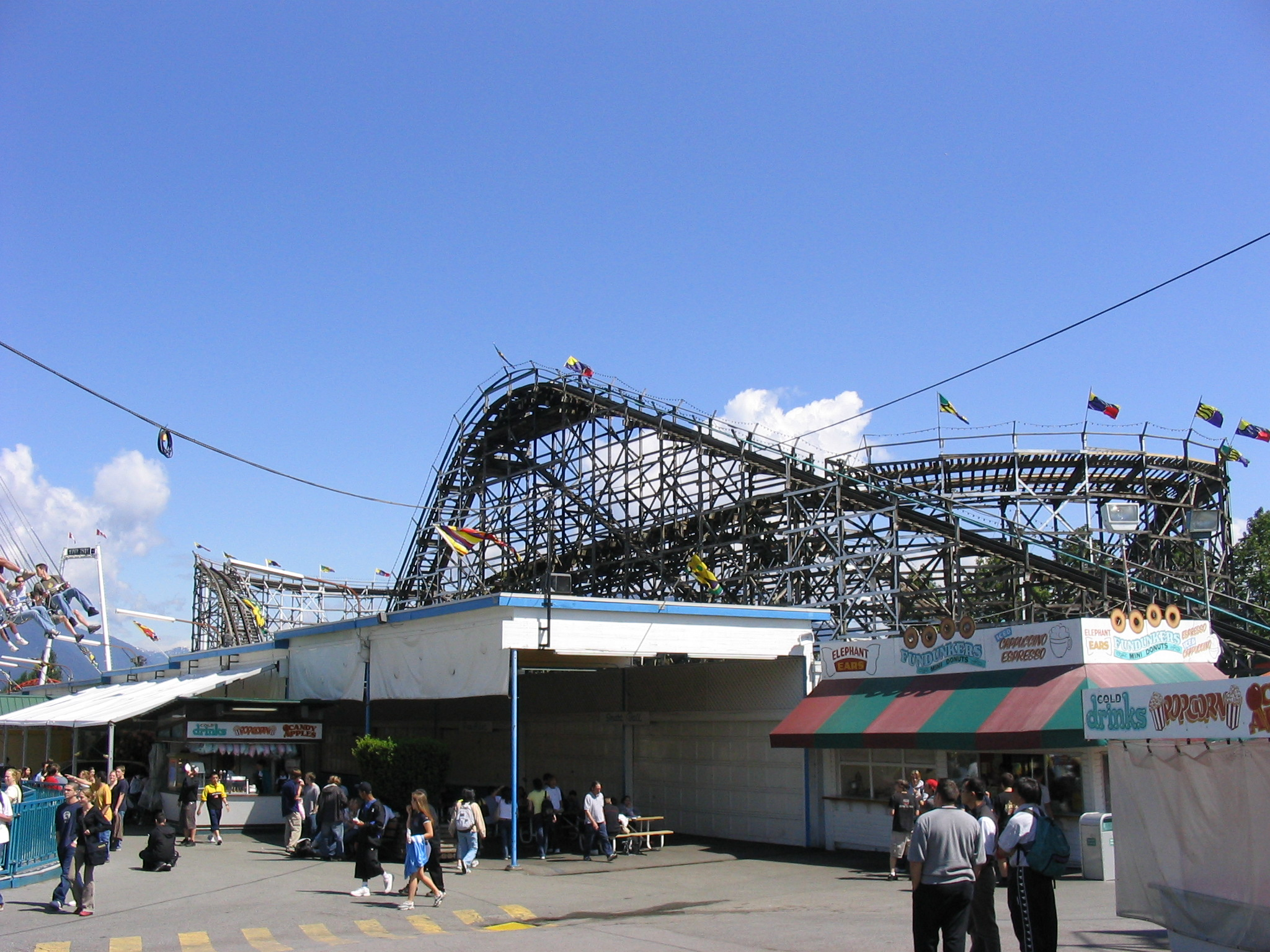
Stalls used to house the carnival games at Playland. The Wooden Roller Coaster is visible behind the stalls.

As of 2018, Playland is home to 39 attractions. Interactive attractions at Playland including a climbing wall, face painting, the Glass House funhouse, and mini golf. Playland also has a haunted house attraction and shooting gallery, although these attractions are not included in the park's admission fee and require an additional fee for entry.

The amusement park also has an arcade and a number of carnival games; including a balloon popping darts game, ring toss, Skee-Ball, and Whac-A-Mole.

In addition to interactive attractions, the park also holds a number of amusement rides, including three roller coasters. In November 2022, the PNE announced it acquired a launched roller coaster from Zamperla for $9-million, with plans to open the new roller coaster in 2024. (Note: The coaster is a refurbished Intamin Hydraulic Launch Coaster called Senzafiato that was originally located at Miragica in Italy)

Roller coasters
Name	Ride manufacturer	Year opened	Type or model	Ride class (Note: The following is the ride's type as described by the park)	Ref(s)
ThunderVolt	Intamin (original); Zamperla	2024	Accelerator Coaster	Thrill	
Bug Whirled	SBF Visa Group	2017	Spinning figure 8 roller coaster	Family	
Kettle Creek Mine Coaster	E&F Miler Industries	2004	Mine train roller coaster	Family	
Wooden Roller Coaster	Designed by Carl Phare & Walker LeRoy; Built by Carl Phare	1958	Wooden roller coaster	Extreme	

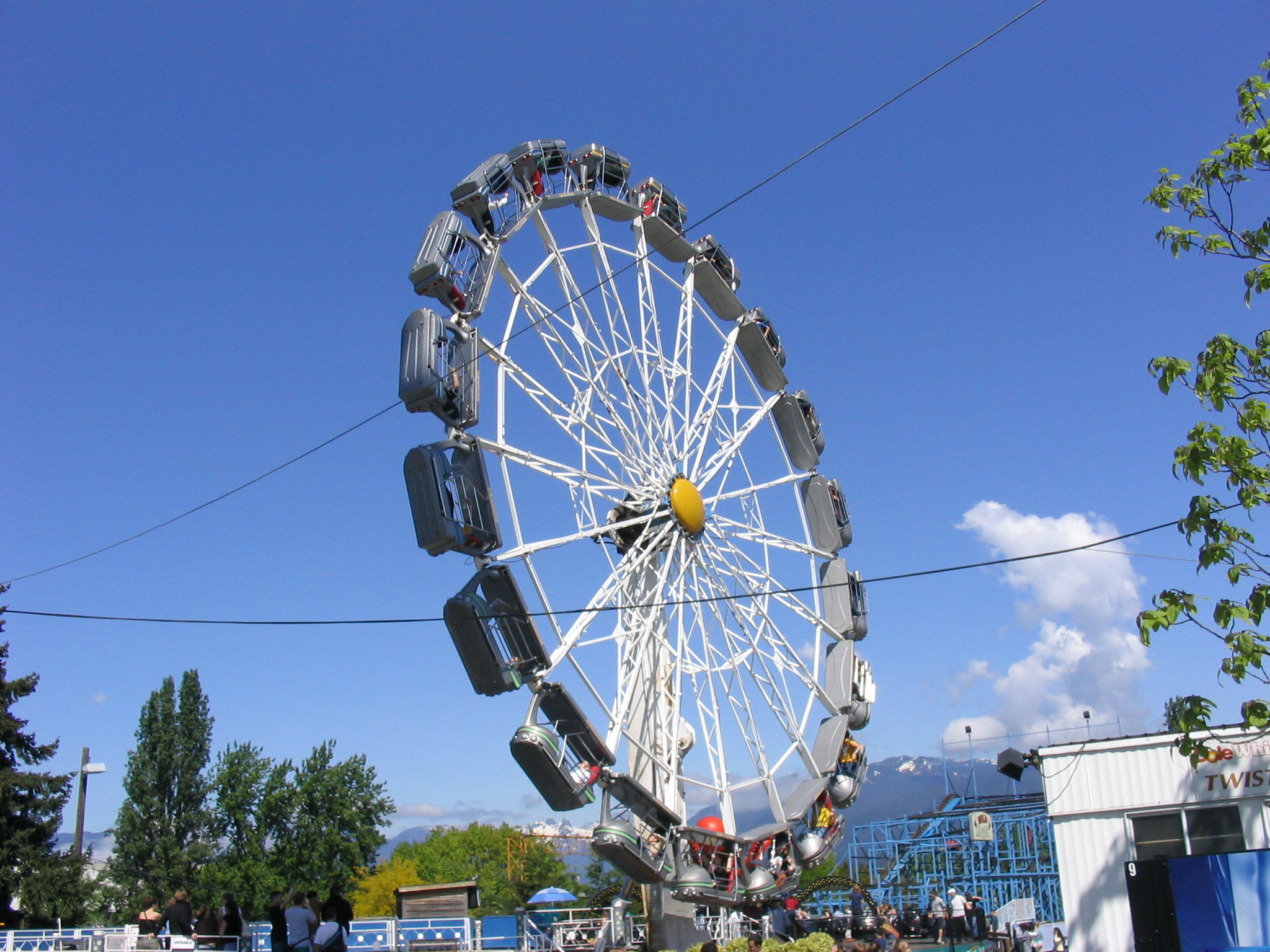
An Enterprise ride at Playland

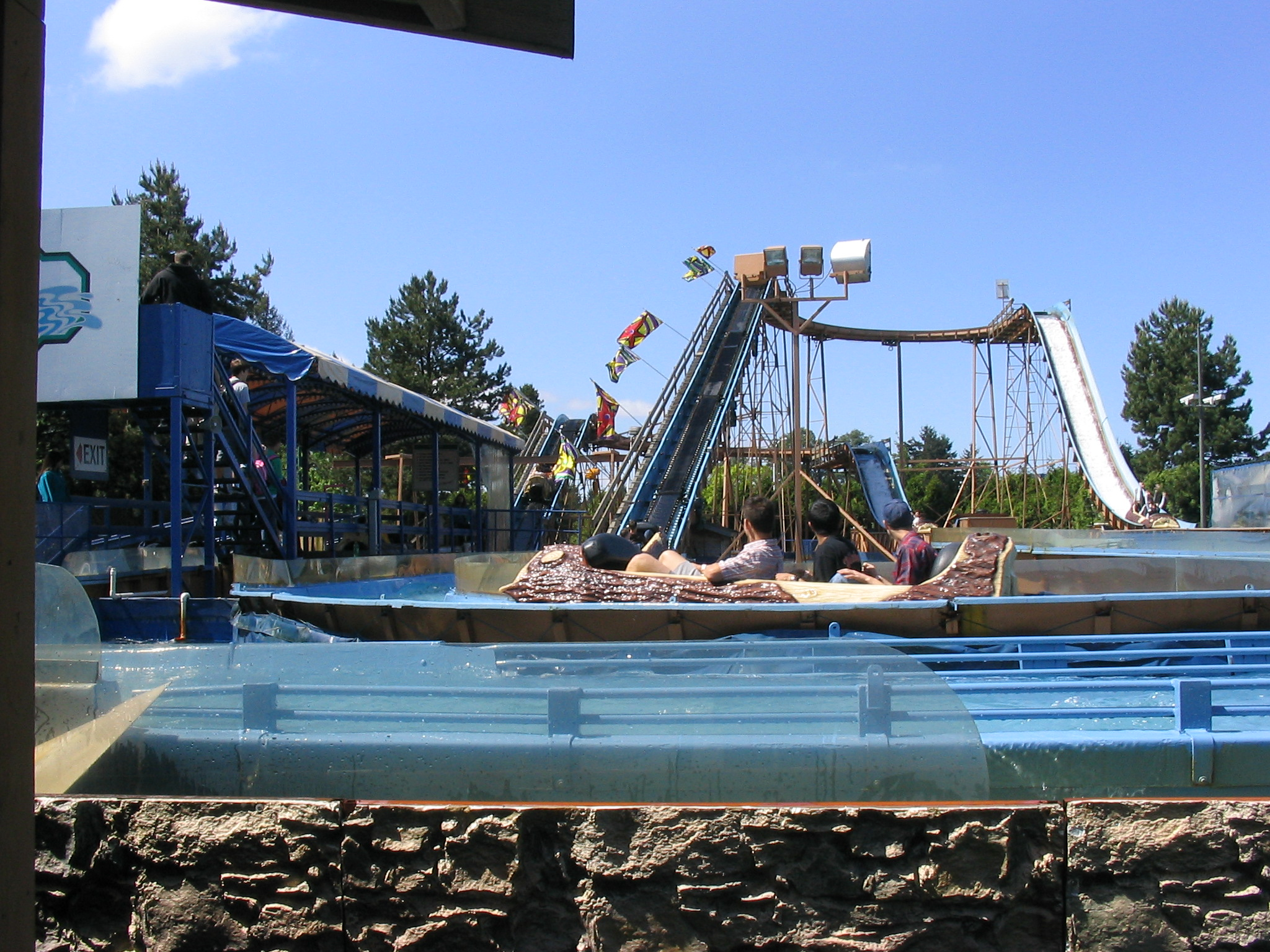
The Flume, a log flume ride at Playland

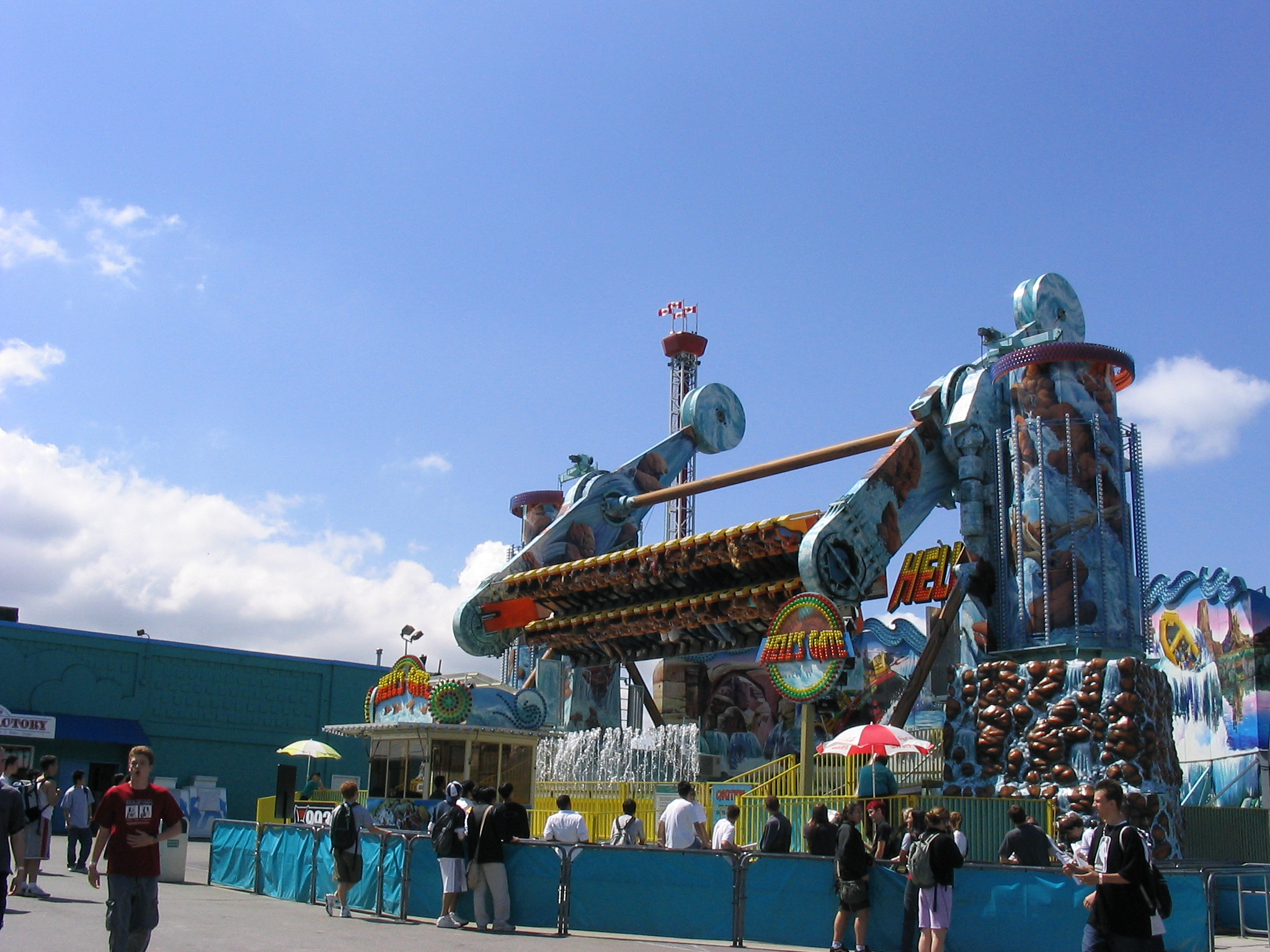
Hell's Gate, a Top Spin ride at Playland

Other amusement rides
Name	Ride manufacturer	Year opened	Type or model	Ride class	Ref(s)
Atmosfear	Funtime (Note: The ride was installed by the Ride Entertainment Group, who handles all Funtime operations in North America.)	2011	66-metre-high (218 ft) swing ride	Extreme	
Balloon Explorers	Zamperla	2013	Samba Tower Balloon Race (ride)	Family	
The Beast	KMG Company	2015	Pendulum ride	Extreme	
Breakdance	HUSS Park Attractions	2005	Breakdance	Extreme	
Cap'n KC				Kids	
Choppers	Hampton			Kids	
Cool Cruzers	Hampton			Kids	
Dizzy Drop	Moser Rides	2017	Rotating drop tower	Family	
Enterprise	HUSS Park Attractions	1984	Enterprise	Extreme	
Flume	Mack Rides	1985	Log flume	Family	
The Flutterbye	Zamperla	2017	Magic Bikes	Family	
Gladiator	HUSS Park Attractions	2005	Troika	Extreme	
Hell's Gate	HUSS Park Attractions	2000	Top Spin	Extreme	
Hellevator	S&S – Sansei Technologies	2000	60-metre-tall (200 ft) drop tower	Extreme	
Honeybee Express	Zamperla	2008	Train ride	Family	
Merry-Go-Round	D.H. Morgan Manufacturing	1991	Carousel	Family	
The Pirate Ship	HUSS Park Attractions	1984	Pirate ship	Extreme	
Rock-N-Cars	Majestic Manufacturing	2018	Bumper cars	Family	
Scrambler	Eli Bridge Co.	1979	Scrambler	Family	
Sea to Sky Swinger	Zamperla	2019	Swing ride	Family	
Skybender	Zamperla	2022	Gryphon	Extreme	
Teacups	Zamperla	2013	Teacups	Family	
Westcoast Wheel	Mulligan Engineering	2007	Ferris Wheel	Family	

=== Past attractions ===
Past attractions at Playland included the "Nintendo Power Zone", an area where guests could play the latest games for Nintendo and PlayStation video game consoles; and "The Maze"- built out of covered chain link fencing located where the Revelation was installed. Corkscrew was the last roller coaster removed from the amusement park, closing in 2018.

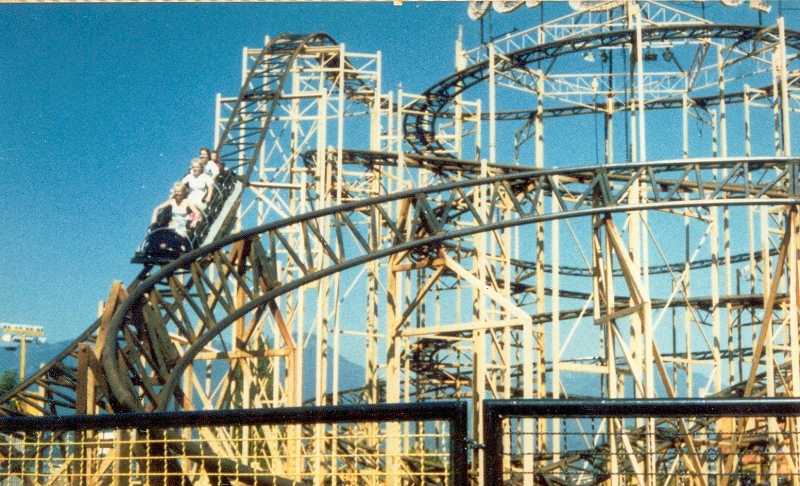
The Anton Schwarzkopf designed "Jet Star II" at Playland in 1987 (later renamed Super Big Gulp; Sponsored by 7-11 and repainted with blue supports, black track and all white cars). The ride was removed from the park in 1994 due to aging and maintenance costs.

Removed rides
Name	Ride manufacturer	Year opened	Year closed	Type or model	Ref(s)
Calypso	Schwarzkopf				
Crazy Beach Party	HUSS Park Attractions	2004	2021	Frisbee	
Corkscrew	Vekoma	1994	2018	Corkscrew with Bayerncurve roller coaster	
Dragon Coaster	Zamperla		2003	Powered roller coaster	
Ferris Wheel	Eli Bridge Co.	1924	2006	Ferris Wheel	
Drop Zone (Note: The following attraction is not included in the park's admission free, and guests are required to pay an additional charge to ride the attraction.)	Skycoaster Company	1998	2022	Skycoaster	
Giant Octopus	Eyerly		2004		
Music Express	Mack Rides	1980	2021	Music Express	
Raiders			2014	Jungle gym	
Rainbow	HUSS Park Attractions	1984	2003	Rainbow	
Revelation	Gravity Works	2000	2022	Skyscraper	
Scooters	Floyd & Baxter	1966	2013	Bumper cars	
Super Big Gulp/Jet Star II	Anton Schwarzkopf	1972	1994	Jet Star II roller coaster	
Super Slide		2008	2026	Amusement park slide	
Tilt-A-Whirl	Sellner Manufacturing		2004	Tilt-A-Whirl	
Wave Swinger	Zierer	1980	2018	Swing ride	
Wild Mouse	Princeton Machine	1979	2008	Wild Mouse roller coaster	
Zillerator	DPV Rides	1996	1997	Galaxi roller coaster	

=== The PNE Summer Fair Rides ===
In addition to the permanent rides installed at Playland; West Coast Amusements (WCA) also brings in travelling rides to Hastings Park for the PNE's Summer Fair (from mid-late August to early September). WCA operates a travelling carnival circuit whose inventory includes over 100 amusement rides such as Ferris Wheels, Hurricane, Himalaya, Twister, and Gravitron, plus kid and family attractions. However, the lineup of rides that WCA brings varies from year-to-year. Some notable past WCA attractions are: Chance Skydiver, Larson Super Loops (and more modern versions including the newest "Fireball"), A.R.M. Qasar, A.R.M. Skymaster, Weber 1001 Nachts, Several Wisdom Gravitron models, Dartron Zendar, Fabbri Evolution, Zamperla Power Surge, Chance Chaos, Zamperla "FootLoose", Tivoli/A.R M. Orbiter, Tivoli/A.R.M Spin Out, and the first ever built Moser Twin Flip, plus an array of kiddie, family, and dark ride attractions.

== Film setting ==
The amusement park has been used for the filming of several films. The 1999 Canadian teen-drama film Rollercoaster, was shot at the park. The opening scenes of the horror film Final Destination 3 were also shot at the park, utilizing the now-retired Corkscrew roller coaster, seen in the film as "Devil's Flight", and the Hellevator tower as "High Dive". Diary of a Wimpy Kid: Dog Days was filmed at Playland for the boardwalk scene, where the Corkscrew and The Revelation ("Cranium Shaker" in the movie) rotating arm ride were shown along with many smaller rides. The Nickelodeon original movie Splitting Adam was also filmed at Playland's water park. The 2010 film Cats & Dogs: The Revenge of Kitty Galore was also filmed at Playland, highlighting the now-retired Wave Swinger ride. The 1996 film, Fear was shot there in the summer of 1995. In 2016, The Edge of Seventeen starring Hailee Steinfeld filmed a scene with co-star Hayden Szeto featuring the Westcoast Wheel and mini-golf course along with the background scenery in screen.
