= Nussli Group =

Nussli
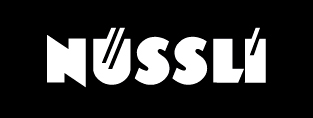
- Type: Private
- Industry: Event Construction
- Founded: 1941 in Hüttwilen, Switzerland
- Headquarters: Hüttwilen (TG), Switzerland
- Key people: Andy Böckli (CEO)
- Revenue: 140 CHF m (2024)
- Number of employees: ca. 470 (2026)
- Website: www.nussli.com

NUSSLI Group, based in Hüttwilen, is an internationally active Swiss group of companies specializing in event and special construction.

Nussli plans and builds temporary and rapid construction infrastructures for events and facilities in the field of sport, culture, and business worldwide. This includes stadiums, grandstands, stages, grandstands, event structures, overlay event infrastructures, pavilions, halls, museums and showrooms, special constructions as well as solutions and objects for interior fittings.

Nussli is represented at 20 locations worldwide and operates on a project basis or with partners. The Nussli Group employs a total of around 470 permanent staff. For major projects, its workforce can temporarily double. Nussli delivers around 1500 projects a year, supported by 9 logistics bases and 2 production sites.

== Company history ==
The company was founded in 1941 by Heini Nüssli (1919–2011) as a carpentry business in Hüttwilen, Switzerland. In 1949, Nüssli married Germaine, née Sprenger (1922-2009), who contributed her assets to the working capital and actively supported her husband.

1958 the company entered into the scaffolding sector and began renting and assembling grandstands and stages made of wood and tubular steel the following year. In 1961, Nussli built the grandstand system for the Swiss Wrestling and Alpine Festival in Zug for the first time. NUSSLI subsequently developed new scaffolding, stage and grandstand systems.

From the 1980s onwards, Nussli made several acquisitions and founded subsidiaries abroad. The first international project was the stage for the Pink Floyd concert The Wall in Berlin in 1990. In the 2000s, international expansion intensified, and NUSSLI entered the exhibition stand construction sector. In 2007, the company spun off its scaffolding division under the name xBau and focused on the event and exhibition market. In 2014, NUSSLI integrated the German exhibition stand construction company Ambrosius, based in Frankfurt, into the group of companies. In the same year, 40 employees left NUSSLI and founded Adunic AG in Frauenfeld, which specialized in high-quality event and pavilion constructions. Four years later, NUSSLI and Adunic merged again and integrated the newly founded NUSSLI Adunic AG as a business unit within the NUSSLI Group.

In 2016, the company celebrated its 75th anniversary and built the temporary wrestling festival arena in Estavayer-le-Lac for the 20th time. With 52,016 seats, the Arène de la Broye was the world's largest temporary grandstand facility for a three-day event at the time. The Swiss festival was celebrated on an even larger scale in 2019: 56,500 spectators experienced the Swiss Wrestling Festival in Zug live in the grandstands.

In 2024, NUSSLI took over a carpentry in Oberneunforn TG and founded the independent subsidiary Ruba Objektbau AG from Ruba Objekteinrichtungen AG together with its own production units for joinery, timber construction and metal construction.In 2025, the timber construction division of Winterthur based contractor Lerch AG, along with its entire workforce and existing client base, became part of Ruba Objektbau AG. Another merger followed in 2026 when Nussli joined forces with eps, a provider of crowd control, turf protection and ground protection systems, to form eps Nüssli Holding GmbH.
