= Hastings–Sunrise =

- Neighbourhood of Vancouver
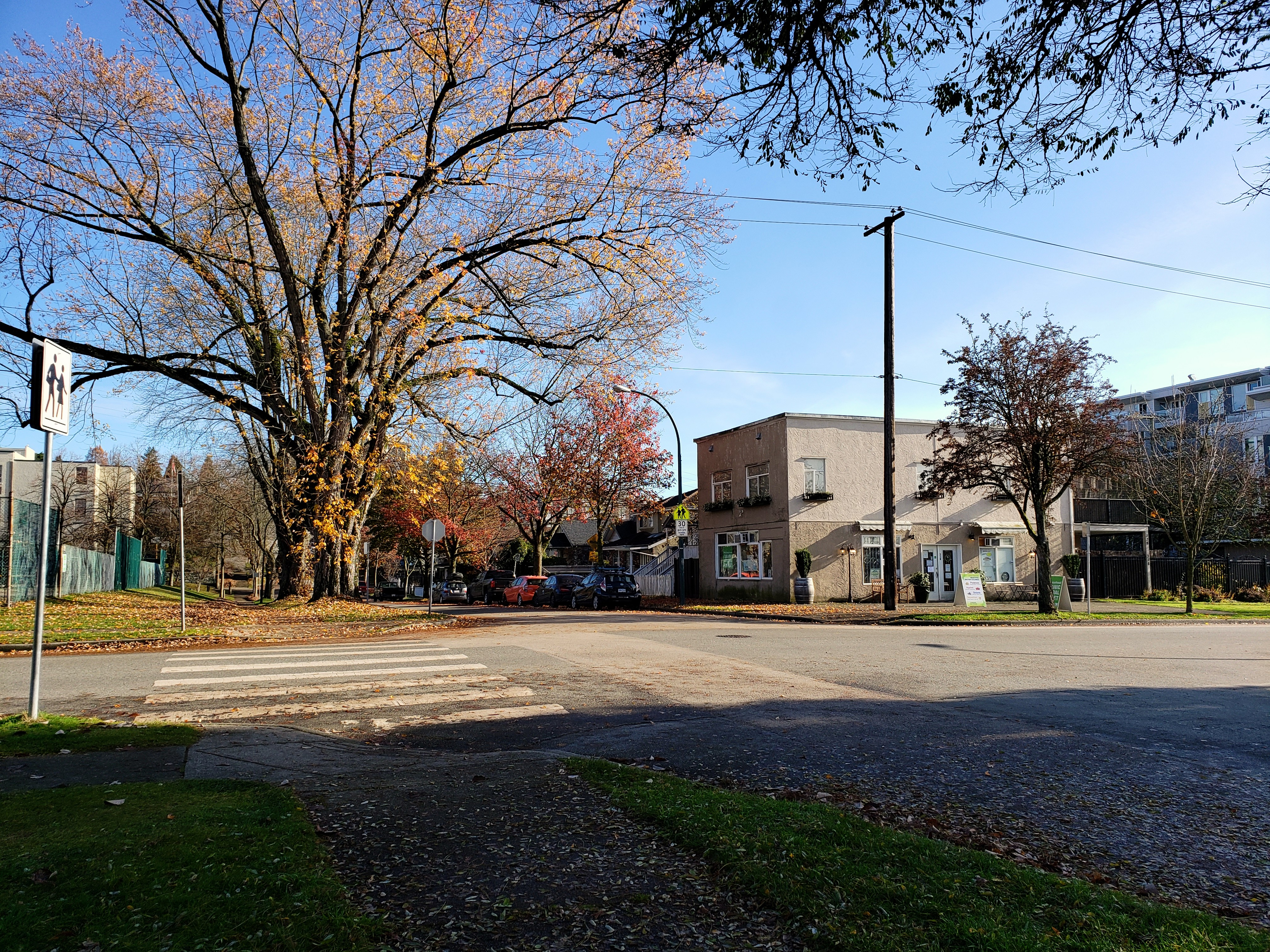
- The corner of Skeena St and Franklin St

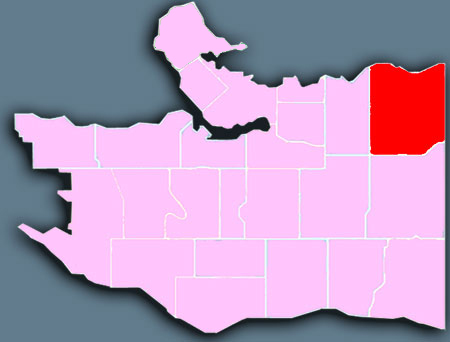
- Location of Hastings-Sunrise in Vancouver

- Location of Hastings-Sunrise in Metro Vancouver
- Coordinates: 49.2808°N 123.0438°W
- Country: Canada
- Province: British Columbia
- City: Vancouver
- Named for: George Fowler Hastings

Government
  - Mayor: Ken Sim

Hastings–Sunrise is a neighbourhood located in the northeastern corner of the city of Vancouver, British Columbia.

One of Vancouver's oldest neighbourhoods, Hastings–Sunrise is primarily residential, with a dense strip of shops and services along East Hastings Street and in pockets along Nanaimo Street, Broadway, Boundary Road and Renfrew Street. The residences are mostly single family detached dwellings, with some multi-family buildings. There is substantial parkland, and the area north of Hastings is partially zoned for light industrial.

== Geography ==
Hastings–Sunrise is bordered by Burrard Inlet to the north, Boundary Road to the east, East Broadway to the south, and Nanaimo Street to the west. The part north of Hastings Street, bordered by Semlin Drive in the west and Renfrew Street in the east, is commonly known as the Round Cape due to its topography. It is a distinct neighbourhood in its own right, with a long history of settlement.

== History ==
The name "Hastings" is a common and historical one in Vancouver for roads, businesses and even a townsite. It is commonly thought to have been derived from the Battle of Hastings from the Norman conquest of England in 1066. In fact, it was named in the mid 19th century to commemorate the visit of the Commander-in-Chief of the Pacific Navy Rear Admiral George Fowler Hastings of the Royal Navy from 1866–1869.

=== Hastings Townsite ===
Hastings–Sunrise is the northern half of a block of land ear-marked by the Province of British Columbia in the mid-19th century as the future location for a harbour city to complement New Westminster, the town on the Fraser River which was then (in 1863) BC's capital and the terminus city for Western Canada. While Gastown became the shipping destination for the BC coast, New Brighton, as the area was then called, became a popular recreational destination for 19th century New Westminster residents.

The northern half was re-christened Hastings (officially 'The Hastings Townsite') in 1869 in honour of a visit by Admiral Hastings. The first road, hotel, post office, telephone, real estate transaction, and subdivision in what is now Vancouver were all built at Hastings Townsite. The area's first ferry service between Burrard Inlet and Victoria, also operated from here. The area didn't become part of the City of Vancouver until 1911.

=== 20th Century ===
Hastings as a resort destination drew vacationers not only to the beachfronts, but also to the Hastings Park racetrack. Local residents lobbied for more 'wholesome' activities and draws, and in 1910 the Pacific National Exhibition (PNE) was the result. The PNE leased City land through the Province until 1994, when (again on the basis of local input), the City began to redevelop some of the PNE land into parkland.

By the 1920s, much of the waterfront was occupied by railyards, wheat pools, and the Port of Vancouver, which continues to be a major employer for the area. There is still public waterfront access at New Brighton Park, near the original Hastings resort site, north of Hastings Park and the PNE.

Historically, the area has been primarily working class, with a large immigrant population, mostly Italian-Canadian. More recently, the area has become an attractive location for young professionals and artists, as well as an influx of immigrants from China and other South-East Asian countries.

== Demographics ==
According to the 2001 Census (Vancouver City statistics in brackets), Hastings–Sunrise, with a population of 33,045 residents, is slightly less dense than Vancouver as a whole, at 40.69 people per hectare (47.58). The age demographics of the neighbourhood closely match those of Vancouver City, with both regions having 55.2% of residents under 40 years of age. 41.2% of Hastings–Sunrise residents reported Chinese as their first language (26.4%), with English second at 36.4% (49.4%), and Italian at 7.3% (1.3%).

The average size of Hastings–Sunrise households is considerably higher than that of Vancouver as a whole, at 3.0 persons (2.3), and while the average household income is less than average, at $53,968 (57,916), the percentage of low income households in the neighbourhood is also slightly below average, at 25.7% (27%).

Panethnic groups in the Hastings–Sunrise neighbourhood (2001−2016)
Panethnic group	2016		2006		2001	
Panethnic group	Pop.	%	Pop.	%	Pop.	%
East Asian (Note: Statistic includes total responses of "Chinese", "Korean", and "Japanese" under visible minority section on census.)	13,730	40.25%	15,445	46.8%	15,670	47.77%
European (Note: Statistic includes all persons that did not make up part of a visible minority or an indigenous identity.)	12,995	38.09%	11,470	34.76%	12,285	37.45%
Southeast Asian (Note: Statistic includes total responses of "Filipino" and "Southeast Asian" under visible minority section on census.)	3,290	9.64%	3,060	9.27%	2,220	6.77%
Indigenous	1,100	3.22%	755	2.29%	605	1.84%
South Asian	900	2.64%	795	2.41%	740	2.26%
Latin American	735	2.15%	400	1.21%	440	1.34%
Middle Eastern (Note: Statistic includes total responses of "West Asian" and "Arab" under visible minority section on census.)	320	0.94%	135	0.41%	155	0.47%
African	290	0.85%	300	0.91%	245	0.75%
Other/Multiracial (Note: Statistic includes total responses of "Visible minority, n.i.e." and "Multiple visible minorities" under visible minority section on census.)	760	2.23%	640	1.94%	450	1.37%
Total responses	34,115	98.67%	33,000	99.61%	32,805	99.27%
Total population	34,575	100%	33,130	100%	33,045	100%
Note: Totals greater than 100% due to multiple origin responses

=== Politics and government ===
Provincially, Hastings–Sunrise is part of the Vancouver-Hastings electoral district, and federally it is contained within the riding of Vancouver East. Since Vancouver has an at large civic electoral system, there is no local representation on City Council. The neighbourhood has a history of voting for left of centre parties, and for several successive elections (as of 2013) has been represented both federally and provincially by the left wing New Democratic Party.

== See also ==
- Pacific National Exhibition
- Hastings Park
- Hastings Sunrise Game
