= Boblo Island Amusement Park =

Former Canadian amusement park

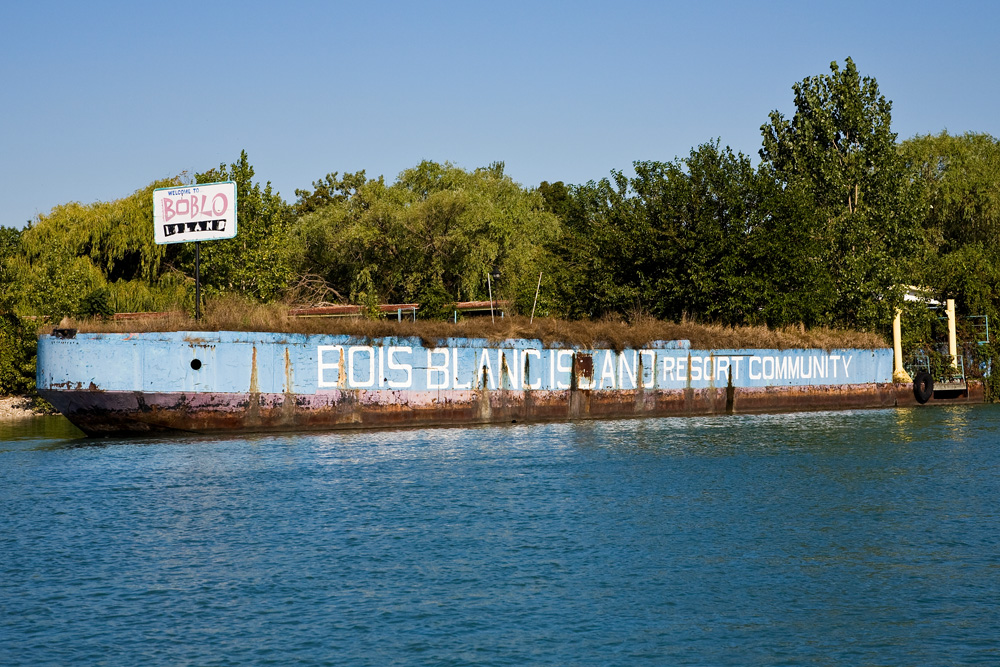
- Former main dock to Boblo Island in 2008
- Interactive map of Boblo Island Amusement Park
- Location: Bois Blanc Island, Ontario
- Coordinates: 42°05′38.19″N 83°07′2.94″W
- Opened: June 18, 1898
- Closed: September 30, 1993

Boblo Island Amusement Park was an amusement park which operated from June 18, 1898, until its closure on September 30, 1993. Its amusement rides were sold in 1994.

The park was located on Bois Blanc Island, Ontario, just above the mouth of the Detroit River. The island, known in Detroit by the name "Bob-Lo", has been characterized as that city's Coney Island.

== History ==
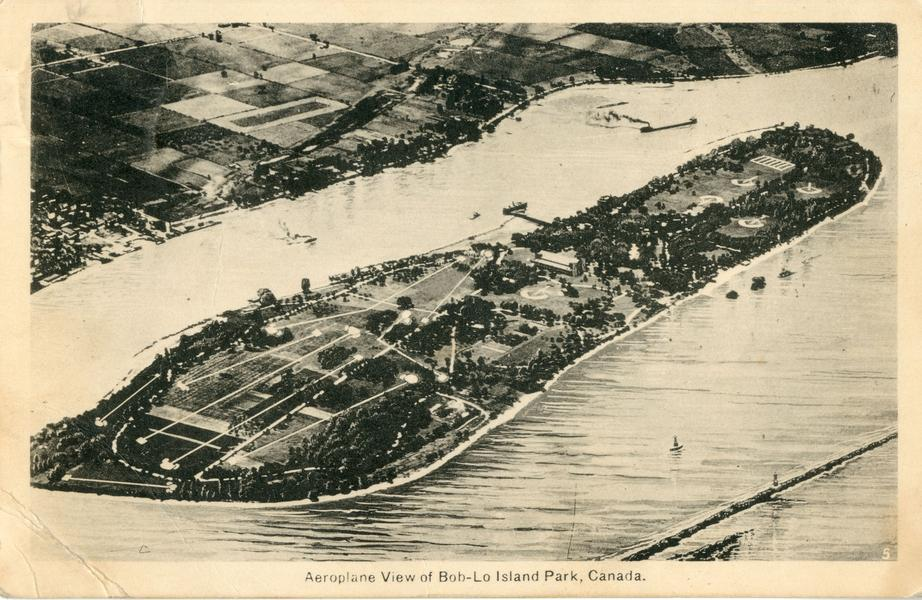
Boblo Island in 1941

In 1898, the Detroit, Windsor, and Belle Isle Ferry Company established a recreation park on the Detroit River, about 18 miles southwest of Windsor, Ontario. The park became known as Boblo Island and its first amusement park rides were in operation by 1910. The Whip ride was installed in 1920. In 1949, the island was threatened with bankruptcy and was later purchased by the Browning family.

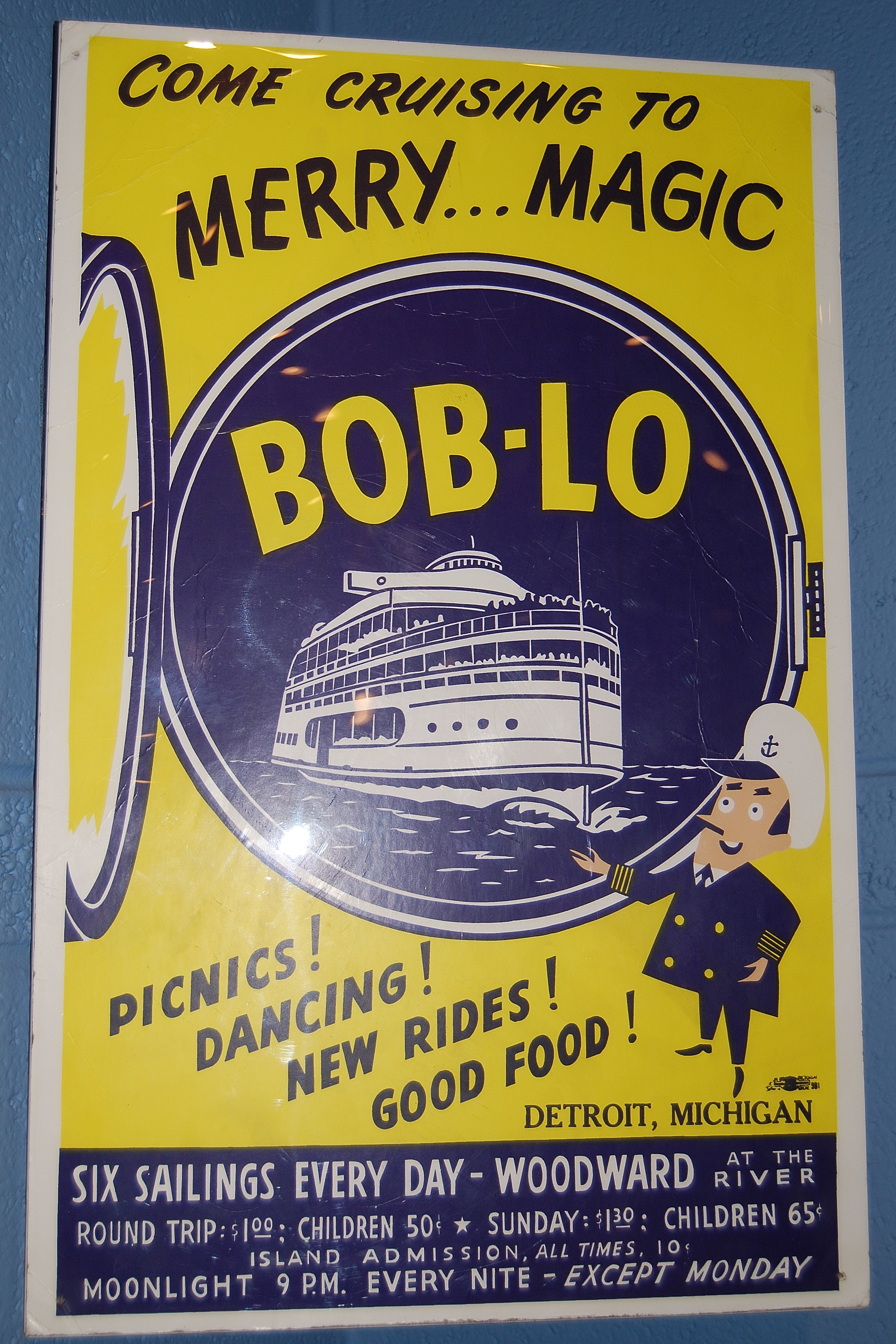
An ad for Boblo Island

The Browning family added more attractions in the following years, including a roller coaster, Ferris wheel, fun house, and more. A miniature railroad was built around the island in the 1960s. The swan paddle boat ride was added in 1970, along with the Thunder Bolt roller coaster in 1973. The Browning Family sold the island to Cambridge Properties of Kentucky in 1979, which led to several owners in the years that followed. Boblo Island enjoyed a resurgence under the Automobile Club of Michigan, which paid $6.5 million for the island in 1983.

=== Final years ===
Though it was not looking for a buyer, the Michigan AAA sold Boblo Island in 1988 to the International Broadcasting Corporation, a Minneapolis-based concern that owned the Harlem Globetrotters and Ice Capades.

IBC declared bankruptcy in 1991. The boats were sold off as a result of a decision to shutter operations at the Detroit dock. In February 1992, the park was put up for sale for US$9 million, half of its 1988 purchase price, though it committed to opening it for that summer. Though one expert felt that Boblo was too big to fail outright and could be turned around, by that June, no firm offers had been made for the park. The loss of the Detroit ferry service dented attendance severely in the 1992 season, which along with poor weather caused the park to miss its attendance goal.

With no buyers materializing, Norton Auctioneers of Coldwater, Michigan, was retained to sell the property at auction on February 10, 1993. A Michigan-based group of investors made the winning bid of $3.8 million. The group had plans to close the park in 1994 and redevelop the land into a golf course, hotel, expanded marina, residential housing and condominiums. Two days later the bid was rejected by Boblo's creditors due to their $250,000 deposit check bouncing. Following the rejection, Michael Moodenbaugh, a contractor, commercial developer and part-owner of a Seattle amusement and water park was declared the winner with the second highest bid of $3.7 million.

The 1993 season proved bumpy and was marred by miscues including disputes with island residents and the Canadian Coast Guard, compounded by the leader of Enchanted Parks, Michael Moodenbaugh, being seriously injured and breaking his spine in a car accident in Toledo, Ohio, in September. Moodenbaugh had hired Liberal MPP Remo Mancini to help market the park. Larry Benaroya, his associate, and his Northern Capital took control of the property; Mancini was fired, and the ownership group put it back on the market in January 1994. Moodenbaugh later sued Benaroya and others for attempting to sell the park while he lay in a "virtual coma".

In March 1994, the rides were dismantled and sold off piecemeal to the Pacific National Exhibition and a series of U.S. theme parks, a moment that confirmed the "worst fears" of Malden Township officials; the amusement park paid 25 percent of its taxes. The Sky Streak roller coaster was relocated to the theme park Selva Mágica in Mexico and renamed Titán.

=== Reuse of the property ===
In 1994, John Oram, an Iraqi immigrant to the United States who owned car stereo businesses, purchased the Boblo Island site. He vaguely proposed a casino, hotel, and other development. Oram then leased and shut down the White Sands boater's hangout adjacent to the park site, citing trespassers but infuriating boaters; as a result, the lease was dropped within weeks.

In late 1995, the site began to be marketed for residential development. Townhouses and condominiums were proposed in 1997. The island was off limits to non-residents until 2002.

American investors were scared away after the September 11 attacks, which hurt the financial outlook for the development. Not a single lot was sold between 9/11 and May 2004. $19 million in debt, John's brother Randy forced Boblo Island into court-appointed receivership in 2004. KPMG found there was no money left to continue supplying basic services. Dominic Amicone became the new owner in 2005. However, a local housing slump meant little was developed.

The tower for the Space Needle ride was demolished in 2021, with Amicone citing "health and safety concerns". Today, the island has been transformed into a residential community, occupied by luxury homes, condos and a marina. Some remnants of its past as an amusement park still exist, such as the ruins of some of the rides and buildings.

== Attractions ==
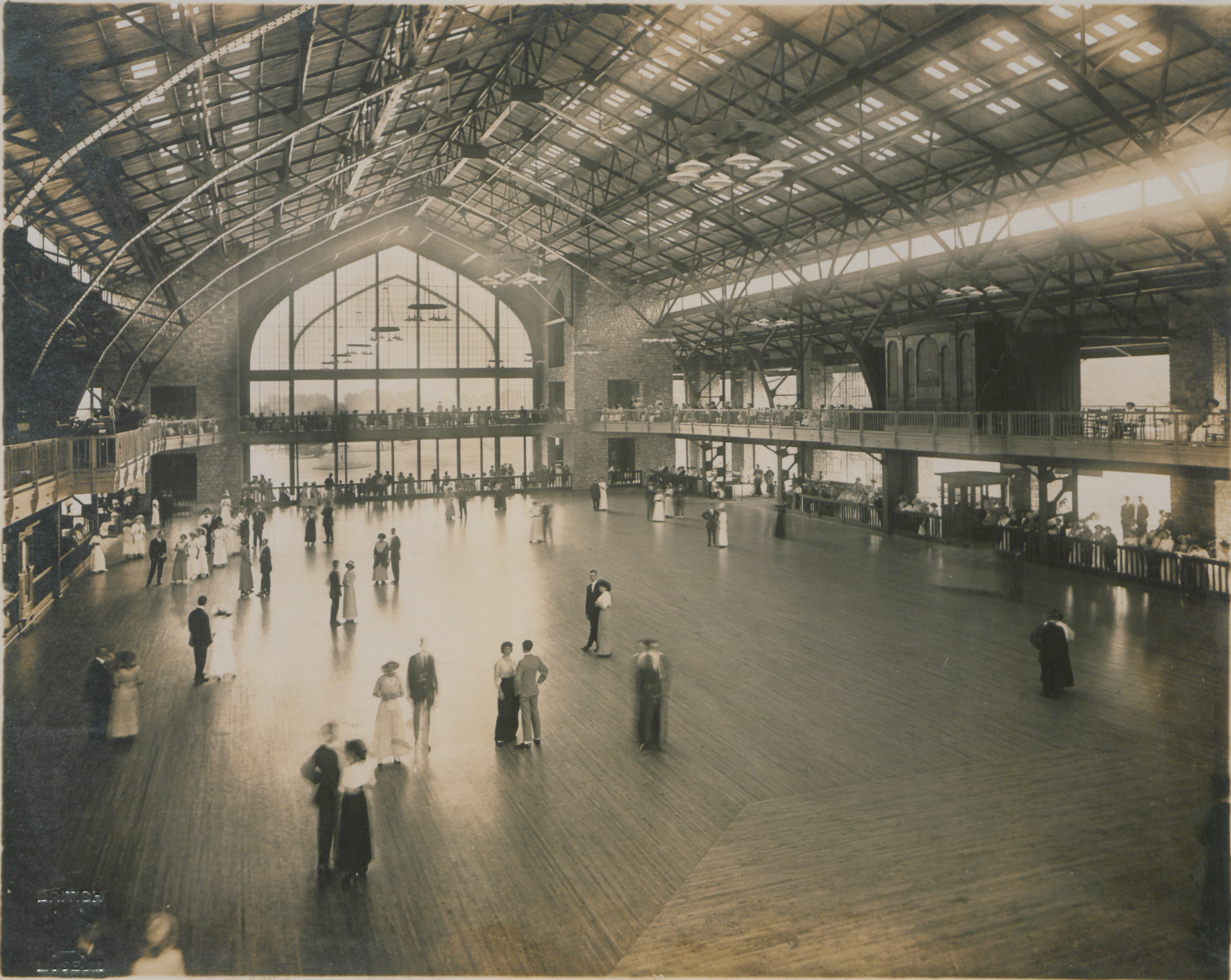
The dance hall in its heyday, 1914

In its early years, Henry Ford financed a dance hall that was rumored to have been designed and built by famed Detroit architect Albert Kahn, but was later determined to have been designed by John Scott. The dance hall was the second largest in the world, holding 5,000 dancers at full capacity and featured one of the world's largest orchestrions from the Welte company: a 16 foot tall, 14 foot wide, self-playing Wotan-model orchestrion with 419 pipes and percussion section.

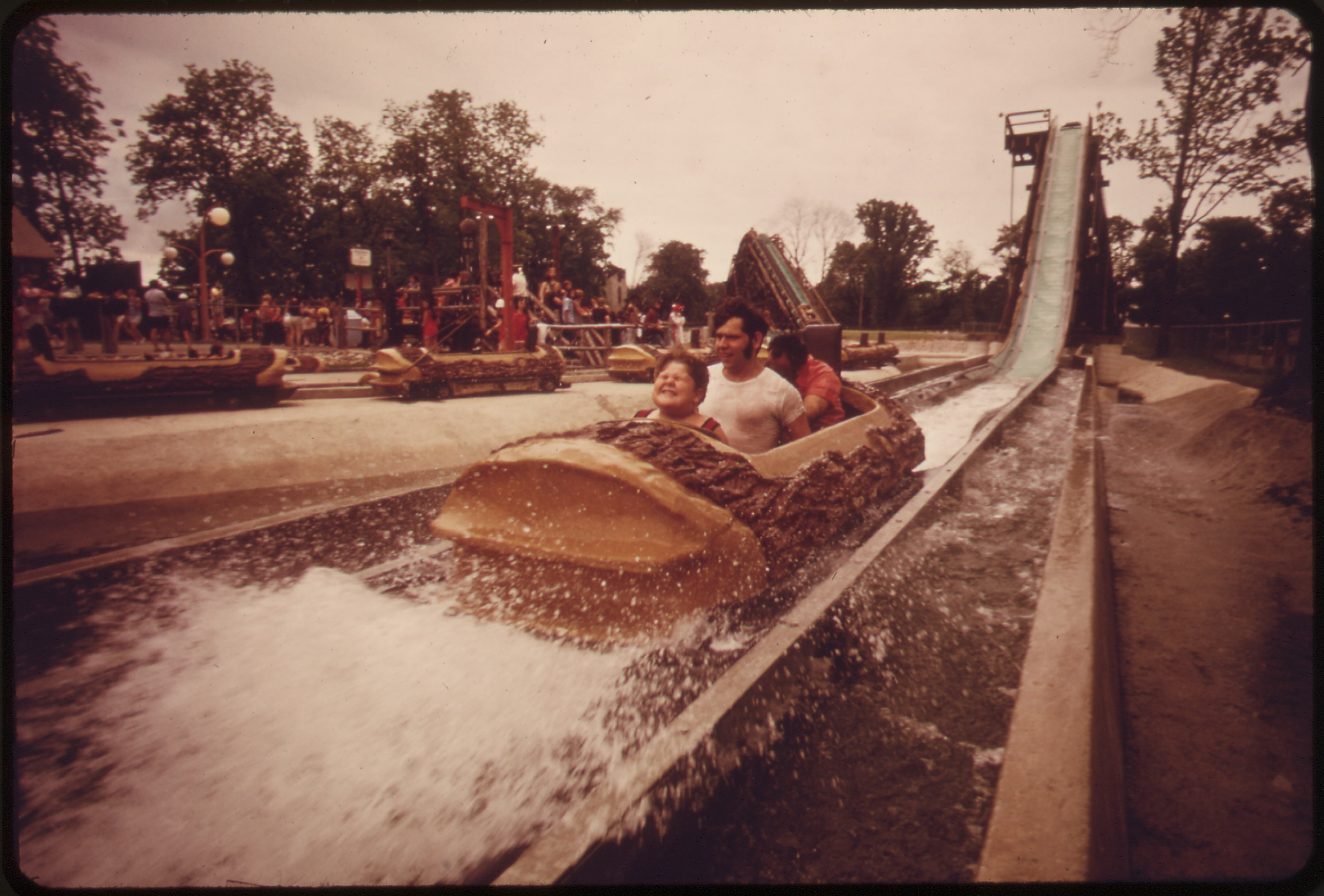
The Log Flume, 1973

The Falling Star, Log Flume, Enterprise, Sky Tower (Space Needle), Ferris wheel, a zoo, and a carousel were the signature attractions. Screamer, a double corkscrew; Nightmare, an indoor all-dark ride; and Sky Streak (previously named Thunder Bolt), a steel out-and-back design, were its three roller coasters. To move visitors around the island, the park had a small railroad.

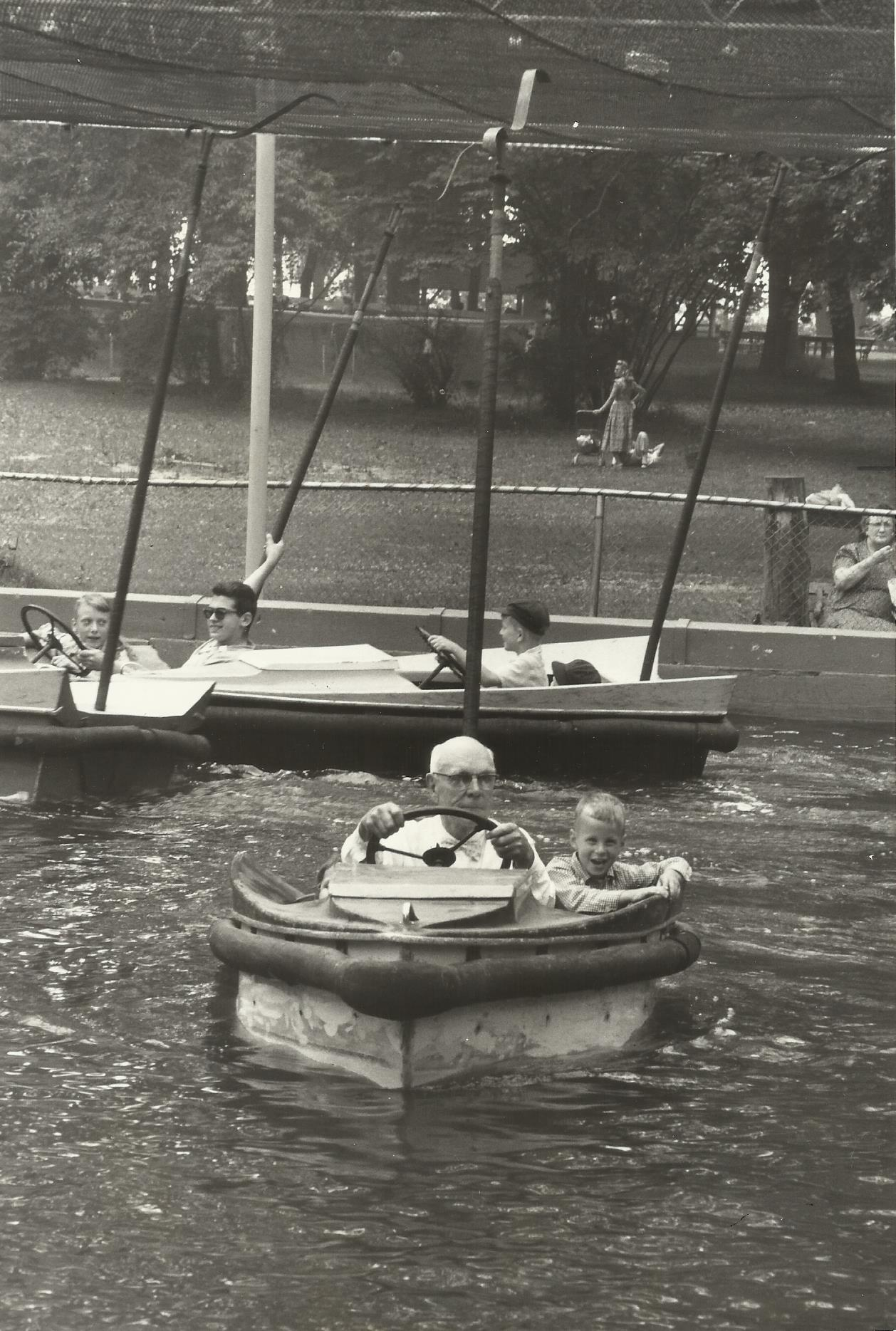
Detroit Judge Ira W. Jayne piloting a Scootaboat on Boblo Island in 1958

Boblo's Scootaboats, which were very similar to well known Bumper Cars, were a popular ride. The cars operated by drawing power from an overhead electric grid unlike the Bumper Boats in use today. The Super-Satellite Jet Ride was also popular among visitors. Other rides included the Swan Boats, the Whip, Wild Mouse, Tilt-a-Whirl, and Dodge'em Cars.

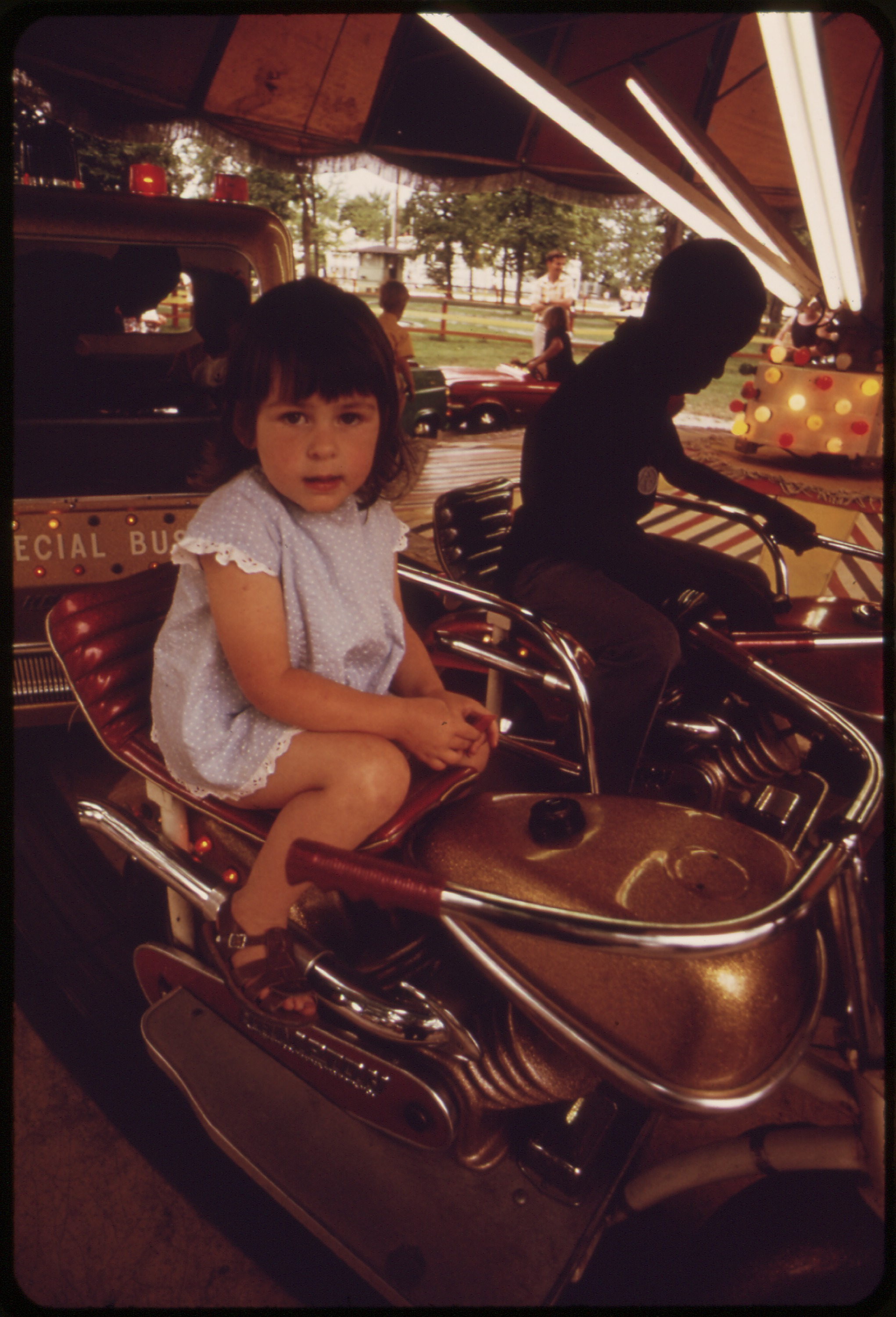
A ride at Boblo Island, 1973

Beginning in 1952, Joe Short, a man of diminutive physical stature, was employed as 'Captain Boblo', and traveled on the boats entertaining passengers of all ages. He wore a variety of colorful clothing, including a large hat with 'Captain Bob Lo' on the peak, and was typically equipped with binoculars for navigation purposes. He previously worked for Ringling Brothers Circus and captivated children with adventurous tales and knock-knock jokes until his retirement in 1974, at the age of 90. After the boats docked at night back in Detroit, Mr. Short continued entertaining at the local bars and taverns he frequented.

== Boblo Boats ==
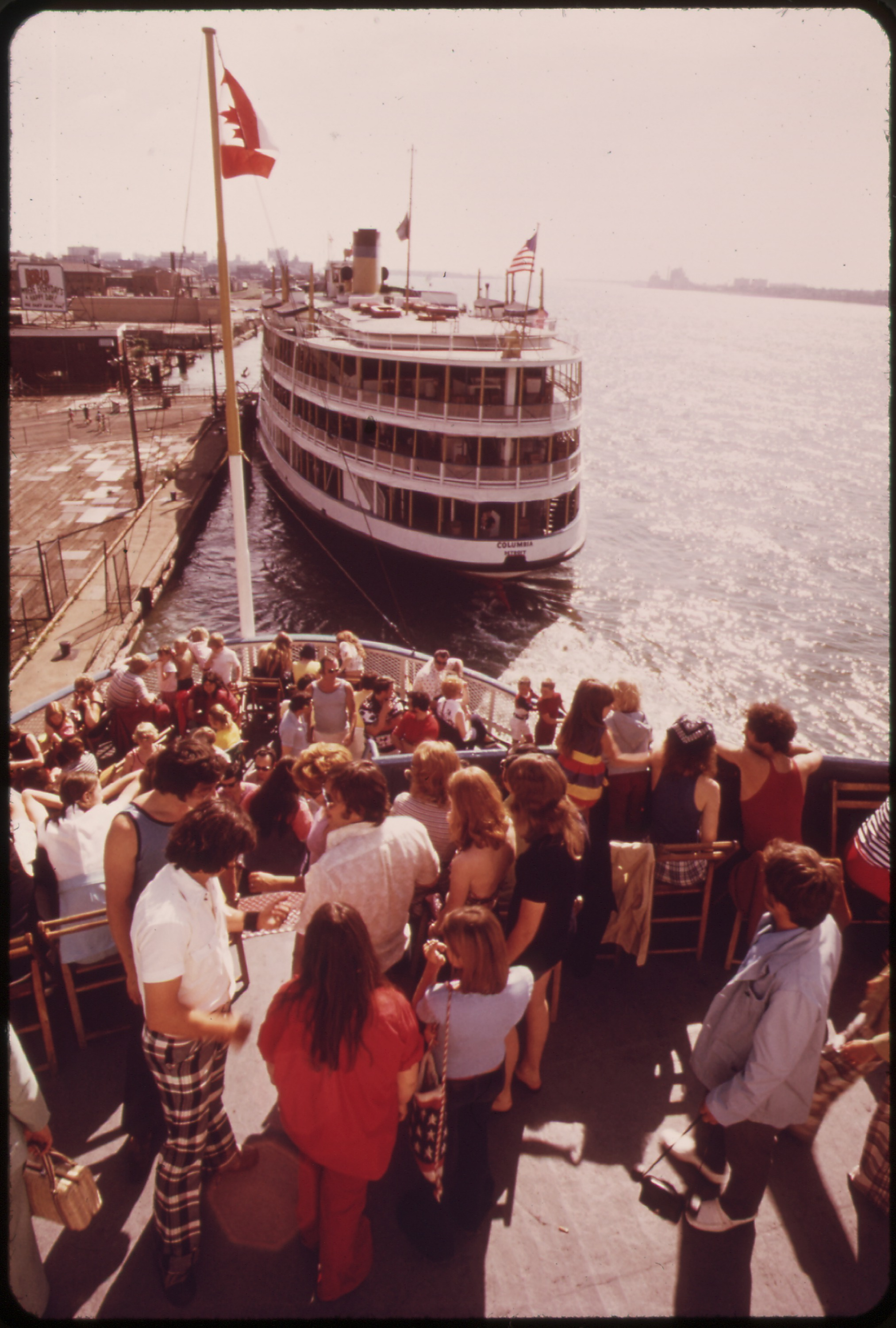
From the top deck of the SS St. Claire, passengers watch the SS Columbia circa 1973. Both vessels are bound for Boblo Island.

The island is a five-minute ferry ride from Amherstburg, Ontario, and 18 miles (29 km) from Detroit. For more than 85 years, the Boblo Island Amusement Park was famous for being served by the Steamer Ste Claire and the Steamer Columbia excursion boats that could hold about 2,500 passengers each. The "Boblo Boats" were sold in November 1991. Other smaller ferries served the park from Amherstburg and Gibraltar, Michigan, which were located closer to the park on the Detroit River.

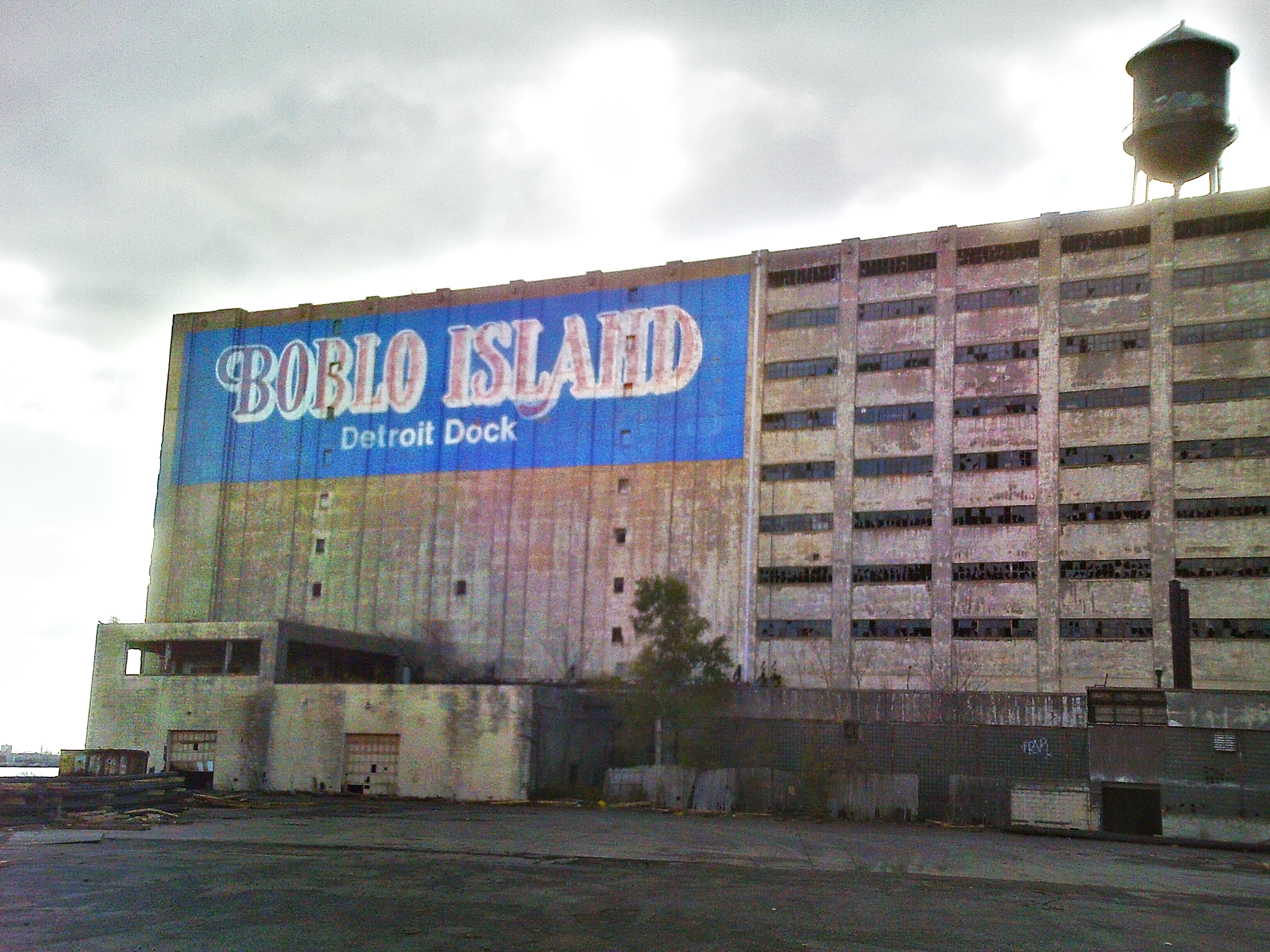
The abandoned Boblo Island Detroit Dock Building in Detroit in 2010. It was demolished in 2023.

The SS Ste. Claire was engulfed in an accidental fire while docked on the Detroit River on July 6, 2018. The fire could not be contained and destroyed the historic mahogany woodwork and upper decks. "Yeah, she's 110 years old, but she's well-built and she survived," said boat co-owner, Ron Kattoo. "We are at the point in restoration to where it was a steel skeleton structure ready to be rebuilt." Two years later, very little had been done.

== Lawsuit ==
=== Bob-Lo Excursion Co. v. Michigan ===
The State of Michigan brought a racial discrimination case against the operators of the ferry service. After Michigan found Bob-Lo Excursion guilty and fined the company, Bob-Lo Excursion filed a lawsuit against the state, Bob-Lo Excursion Co. v. Michigan, 333 U.S. 28 (1948). The case reached the U.S. Supreme Court and resulted in a notable 1948 decision construing the scope of the Commerce Clause. In June 1945, Sarah Elizabeth Ray and 12 other female workers involved in the war effort (and referred to as "girls" during the legal proceedings) took part in a sponsored trip to Boblo Island. Ray was removed from the boat because she was not white, enforced according to a Bob-Lo Excursion policy "excluding so-called 'zoot-suiters', the rowdyish, the rough, and the boisterous, and it also adopted the policy of excluding colored." The Michigan Supreme Court fined the company $25 for the discrimination they presented towards Ray. The company had claimed it could exclude her because it was a private concern operating in another country and that neither Michigan nor any other state had authority to regulate commerce with Canada (a foreign country); the U.S. Supreme Court affirmed the Michigan Supreme Court, which had upheld the jurisdiction of the state's anti-discrimination provisions and found against the company.

== See also ==
- List of defunct amusement parks
- Sarah Elizabeth Ray
