= Bois Blanc Lighthouse =

Bois Blanc Lighthouse may refer to

- Bois Blanc Island Lighthouse and Blockhouse, a National Historic Site of Canada, on Bois Blanc Island, Ontario
- Bois Blanc Light, on Bois Blanc Island, Michigan, United States
