= Transformers: Age of Extinction =

2014 film by Michael Bay

- Theatrical release poster
- Directed by: Michael Bay
- Written by: Ehren Kruger
- Based on: Hasbro's Transformers action figures
- Produced by: Lorenzo di Bonaventura; Tom DeSanto; Don Murphy; Ian Bryce
- Starring: Mark Wahlberg; Stanley Tucci
- Cinematography: Amir Mokri
- Edited by: William Goldenberg; Roger Barton; Paul Rubell
- Music by: Steve Jablonsky
- Production companies: Paramount Pictures; Hasbro Studios; di Bonaventura Pictures; China Movie Channel; Jiaflix Enterprises
- Distributed by: Paramount Pictures
- Release dates: June 19, 2014 (Hong Kong); June 27, 2014 (United States)
- Running time: 165 minutes
- Countries: United States; China
- Language: English
- Budget: $210 million
- Box office: $1.105 billion

Transformers: Age of Extinction is a 2014 science fiction action film based on Hasbro's Transformers toy line. It is the sequel to Transformers: Dark of the Moon (2011) and the fourth installment in the Transformers film series. Like its predecessor, the film was directed by Michael Bay and written by Ehren Kruger. It stars Mark Wahlberg and Stanley Tucci, with Kelsey Grammer, Nicola Peltz, Jack Reynor, Sophia Myles, Bingbing Li, Titus Welliver, and T.J. Miller in supporting roles. It does not feature the original human cast from the previous three films, instead introducing a new human cast as well as new Transformers, including the Dinobots. In the film, inventor Cade Yeager teams up with Optimus Prime and the surviving Autobots to investigate a manhunt involving Transformers for their hostility.

The film was released in the United States on June 27, 2014, by Paramount Pictures. It received negative reviews from critics, criticizing its pacing, runtime, direction, plot, and dialogue. The film was a box office success, grossing $1.105 billion worldwide against a $210 million production budget, making it the highest-grossing film of 2014, the only film in 2014 to gross over $1 billion, and the tenth-highest-grossing film of all time at the time of its release. It was followed by a sequel, Transformers: The Last Knight in 2017.

== Plot ==
Sixty-five million years ago, an alien race known as the "Creators" used devices called Seeds to cover Earth with a metallic alloy called "Transformium", wiping out the dinosaurs in the process. In the present day, K.S.I. Industries is using Transformium to build Transformer drones.

Five years after the Battle of Chicago, (Note: As depicted in Transformers: Dark of the Moon (2011)) humans view Transformers as hostile and terminate all joint operations with them. Though the public believes the Autobots were granted sanctuary, they are hunted down by Cemetery Wind, a rogue CIA black-ops division led by opportunistic rogue intelligence operative Harold Attinger, who believes all Transformers are dangerous and must be destroyed. Lockdown, a Cybertronian assassin and bounty hunter working for the Creators, is tasked with finding Optimus Prime. In exchange, he gives Attinger a Seed if his division captures Optimus. Lockdown locates and kills Ratchet when he refuses to give up Optimus's location.

Badly damaged in Mexico City, Optimus hides in Texas and is found by Cade Yeager, a financially struggling inventor and single father. While his teenage daughter Tessa and business partner Lucas Flannery urge him to turn Optimus in, Cade instead fixes him. Hoping to collect an advertised reward, Lucas alerts the authorities, and James Savoy, Attinger's field commanding operative, attacks the Yeager farm. Still, Optimus, and Tessa's secret boyfriend, Irish rally car driver Shane Dyson, rescue the family. During the pursuit, Lucas is killed by one of Lockdown's grenades. Optimus summons the surviving Autobots – Bumblebee, Hound, Drift, and Crosshairs. Using a stolen CIA drone, Cade discovers K.S.I.'s involvement with Cemetery Wind and the attacks on the Autobots.

Infiltrating K.S.I.'s headquarters in Chicago, Cade discovers the dead Autobots and Decepticons being melted down to make Transformer drones—the K.S.I. CEO Joshua Joyce is in league with Attinger to revolutionize global defenses and improve human society using the Seed to make more Transformium. He has also used the captured Brains and Megatron's head to create prototype Transformer soldiers, Galvatron and Stinger. The Autobots storm the building and destroy the laboratory, but they soon leave after Joshua declares they no longer need them. Attinger forces Joshua to deploy Galvatron and Stinger to capture the Autobots. As Galvatron battles Optimus, he gets autonomously freed from control. Suddenly, Lockdown arrives and abducts both Optimus and Tessa while Galvatron retreats.

While Lockdown's large prison spacecraft hovers over Chicago to hand over the Seed, Cade, Shane, and the Autobots sneak on board to rescue Optimus and Tessa. They hijack a smaller ship carrying other Transformers called the Dinobots just before Lockdown leaves Earth. The Autobots learn that Galvatron is Megatron reincarnated, plotting to use the Seed and the Transformer drones to conquer the world, and that KSI plans to use the Seed in the Mongolian desert to create vast amounts of usable Transformium. Cade informs Joshua, who agrees to hand over the Seed. Galvatron reactivates himself and takes control of the drones, organizing them into a new Decepticon army. A battle follows in Hong Kong between the Autobots, Cemetery Wind, and the Decepticons. During the fight, Cade sends Savoy plummeting to his death while Optimus frees the Dinobots and wins their allegiance through trial by combat, becoming essential to the Autobots' victory.

Lockdown returns to recapture Optimus and the Dinobots, using a large magnet to cause destruction. After disabling the magnet, Optimus fights Lockdown. In the ensuing duel, Optimus kills Attinger to save Cade, but the distraction allows Lockdown to pin Optimus down with his sword. Cade ends up fighting Lockdown one-on-one while Tessa and Shane use a tow truck to free Optimus, who kills Lockdown before destroying the remaining Decepticons with Lockdown's grenade. Galvatron retreats, vowing to return. Optimus asks the Autobots to protect the Yeagers, then flies away into space with the Seed, sending the Creators a message that he is coming for them.

== Cast ==
=== Humans ===
- Mark Wahlberg as Cade Yeager:
  A single father and struggling inventor.
- Stanley Tucci as Joshua Joyce:
  An ambitious, arrogant businessman and the head of KSI who wants to build his own Transformers.
- Kelsey Grammer as Harold Attinger:
  A former Navy SEAL and rogue government official who created the CIA black-ops unit, Cemetery Wind to eliminate all Transformers, Autobot or Decepticon, from Earth.
- Nicola Peltz as Tessa Yeager:
  Cade's daughter who is secretly dating Shane.
- Jack Reynor as Shane Dyson:
  Tessa's boyfriend and an Irish rally car driver.
- Sophia Myles as Darcy Tyril:
  Joshua's geologist assistant and ex-girlfriend.
- Li Bingbing as Su Yueming: (苏月明, Sū Yuèmíng)
  The owner of the Chinese factory used by KSI to build their artificial Transformers.
- Titus Welliver as James Savoy:
  A ruthless, corrupt CIA officer and second in-command of the Cemetery Wind working for Attinger.
- T.J. Miller as Lucas Flannery:
  Cade's employee and best friend mechanic.

Greg Anderson, Ethan Graves, Melanie Specht and Victoria Summer play Joshua's assistants. Han Geng portrays himself, playing the guitar and singing in a parked car that is magnetized by Lockdown's ship. Ed Welburn plays a KSI executive. Kevin Covais and Ray Lui play motorists, while Cleo King appears as a realtor.

=== Voices ===
- Peter Cullen as Optimus Prime: The leader of the Autobots who transforms into a rusty 1977 Marmon 97 semi truck and later, a blue and red 2014 Western Star 5700 XE semi-trailer truck with flame decals.
- John Goodman as Hound: An Autobot commando who is a member of the Autobot special forces branch called the Wreckers, and is the weapons specialist of the team who transforms into an Oshkosh Defense Medium Tactical Vehicle.
- Ken Watanabe as Drift: A Samurai-motif Autobot, tactician, and a former Decepticon assassin who transforms into a black and blue 2014 Bugatti Veyron 16.4 Grand Sport Vitesse and a Sikorsky S-97 Raider Helicopter.
- Robert Foxworth as Ratchet: The Autobot medical officer who transforms into a white and green 2009 S.A.R. Hummer H2 ambulance.
- John DiMaggio as Crosshairs: An Autobot paratrooper and elite sniper, who is also the weapons tactician and mechanic, who transforms into a black and green 2014 Chevrolet Corvette C7 Stingray.
- Mark Ryan as Lockdown: A ruthless Cybertronian assassin and bounty hunter who transforms into a grey 2014 Lamborghini Aventador LP 700–4 Coupe. He is hired by the "Creators" to bring Optimus Prime back to them and kill any Autobots who refuse to give up his location.
- Reno Wilson as Brains: A former Decepticon drone turned Autobot who survived the Battle of Chicago and has lost his right leg who explains that Galvatron is a reincarnation of Megatron.
- Frank Welker as Galvatron: A human-made KSI Transformer drone modeled after Optimus Prime who transforms into a black and grey 2014 Freightliner Argosy cab over trailer truck that uses data from the remains of the Decepticon leader Megatron; while being possessed by the latter as a new body.
- Ben Schwartz as Bumblebee: An Autobot scout and Optimus Prime's new second-in-command who transforms into a black 1967 Chevrolet Camaro and later into a yellow and black 2014 Chevrolet Camaro. While the character largely uses sound bites to "speak" in the film, Schwartz provides several lines of original dialogue for the character.

==== Non-speaking robots ====
- Grimlock: The leader of the Dinobots captured by Lockdown and later released by Optimus Prime. He transforms into a fire-breathing mechanical Tyrannosaurus.
- Stinger: A human-made KSI drone that works for Galvatron and is a remake of Bumblebee. He transforms into a 2014 Pagani Huayra sports car.
- Strafe: A Dinobot who transforms into a two-headed Pteranodon.
- Slug: A Dinobot who transforms into a mechanical spiked Triceratops.
- Scorn: A Dinobot with the nickname "Spike" who transforms into a mechanical Spinosaurus.
- Junkheap: A human-made KSI prototype that transforms into a Mack TerraPro garbage truck. Unlike other transformers in the series, Junkheap splits into three separate robots.

== Production ==
=== Development ===
During production for Dark of the Moon, Shia LaBeouf and Michael Bay stated that they would not return for a fourth installment of the franchise. Roland Emmerich, Joe Johnston, Jon Turteltaub, Stephen Sommers, Louis Leterrier and David Yates were rumored to replace Bay. Jason Statham was rumored to star in the fourth installment. Hasbro CEO Brian Goldner revealed that he was able to announce the film as he was talking with Steven Spielberg, Bay and Paramount Pictures. There were rumors that the fourth and fifth installment would be shot back-to-back with Statham as the lead role, which he and Bay denied. Spielberg hoped Bay would return for a fourth installment.

After final negotiations with Bay to direct the film, producer Lorenzo di Bonaventura confirmed that there would be a fourth film in the franchise. In February 2012, Paramount and Bay announced that Bay would be producing and directing a fourth Transformers film, scheduled for a June 27, 2014, release. The film was not a reboot but a sequel to Dark of the Moon, taking place four years later. Ehren Kruger and Steve Jablonsky returned to write the script and the score, respectively. In April 2013, it was announced that China Movie Channel and Jiaflix Enterprises would co-produce the film with Paramount.

On September 1, 2013, Fusible revealed three possible subtitles for the film, which were Last Stand, Future Cast, and Apocalypse. On September 2, TFW 2005 revealed one last possible title, Age of Extinction. On September 3, 2013, Paramount released an official teaser poster for the film, revealing the title to be Transformers: Age of Extinction.

=== Casting ===
In November 2012, Mark Wahlberg was cast in the film. Also in November 2012, The Hollywood Reporter reported that casting had begun for two additional leads: the daughter to Wahlberg's character and her boyfriend, a race car driver. Isabelle Cornish, Nicola Peltz, Gabriella Wilde, and Margaret Qualley were all considered for the role of the daughter, while Luke Grimes, Landon Liboiron, Brenton Thwaites, Jack Reynor, and Hunter Parrish were all considered for the boyfriend. The leads are contracted for three films. In January 2013, Reynor was cast as the boyfriend, and in March 2013, Nicola Peltz was cast as Wahlberg's daughter.

Peter Cullen reprises his role as the voice of Optimus Prime. Glenn Morshower stated in September 2012 that he would appear in the next two films, reprising his role of General Morshower, but Morshower announced in May 2013 that he would not be able to appear in the new films due to a scheduling conflict. In April 2013, Bay revealed that actor Stanley Tucci had joined the cast. On May 1, 2013, actor Kelsey Grammer was cast as the lead human villain named Harold Attinger. On May 6, 2013, actress Sophia Myles was cast in a major role. That same month, Chinese actress Bingbing Li and comedian T. J. Miller joined the cast. On July 14, 2013, Bay announced that Han Geng had joined the cast. That same month, Titus Welliver also joined the cast.

Ahead of the film's release in May 2014, the film's voice cast for the Transformers was announced with actors John Goodman and Ken Watanabe voicing the Autobots, Hound and Drift. Alongside Robert Foxworth and Reno Wilson returning to voice Ratchet and Brains from Dark of the Moon, while Frank Welker reprises his role of Galvatron from The Transformers television series, who was previously voiced by Leonard Nimoy in The Transformers: The Movie, and John DiMaggio, and Mark Ryan in new roles with DiMaggio voicing Crosshairs and Ryan voicing the film's antagonist Lockdown. Nearly nine years since the film's release in May 2023, comedian Ben Schwartz revealed he originally voiced several of Bumblebee's radio clips for the film. He was hired by Bay to come up with some of the radio dialogue for Bumblebee but was changed into radio sounds in the final cut, with the exception that some of his lines were left.

=== Filming ===
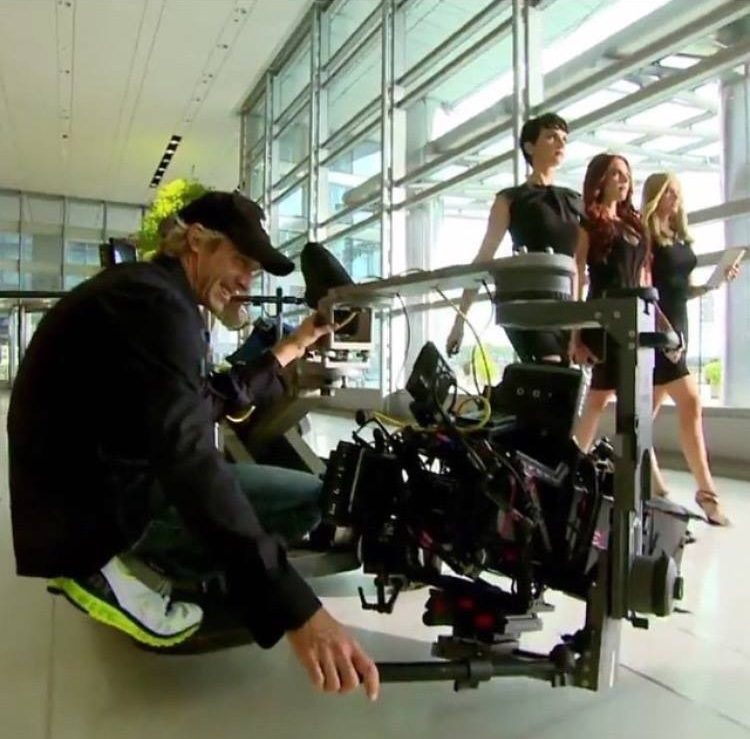
Michael Bay filming Transformers: Age of Extinction; actresses Abigail Klein, Melanie Specht and Victoria Summer are walking in a corridor.

Bay announced that filming had begun on May 28, 2013, in Monument Valley, Utah. Detroit, was used as a stand-in for Hong Kong while McCormick Place in Chicago, was re-dressed to portray a city in China. The movie was the first feature film to be shot using smaller digital IMAX 3D cameras. It also was shot in various other formats, including IMAX 70mm film cameras, digital stereo 3-D, and anamorphic and spherical 35 mm film. From May 28 to June 24, 2013, Michael Bay uploaded photographs of several cars featured in the film, all apparently Autobots, to social networks including Facebook and Flickr. The film featured two unknown Autobots that transformed into a black and blue 2013 Bugatti Veyron Grand Sport Vitesse (going by production name "Drift"), and a green 2014 C7 Corvette Stingray concept (going by production name "Slingshot"). Also revealed was a truck from Western Star Trucks as Optimus Prime's new alternate mode. The Dinobots and Lockdown were confirmed to appear. On October 29, Michael Bay's Official Twitter Account tweeted that principal photography of Transformers 4 had been completed in Hong Kong, and the cast and crew were heading to mainland China. (According to previous reports, crews would be filming there for one week.) Additional filming in Detroit began in early 2014; a pair of steamships (Columbia and Ste. Claire) which had once traveled between Detroit and Bois Blanc Island's amusement park were partially restored and used as props for the film. General Motors allowed film crews access to two of their facilities to be used during filming. Several scenes were filmed at the General Motors Technical Center with scenes being filmed at the Design Center and the Wind Tunnel Facility at the complex. Film crews also were given access to the Milford Proving Grounds where highway chase scenes were filmed.

=== Incidents ===
On October 17, 2013, while filming in Hong Kong, director Michael Bay was assaulted by two brothers surnamed Mak, who demanded a payment of HK$100,000 (12,900 U.S. dollars). The elder brother also attacked three police officers during the incident. Both brothers and a third man surnamed Chan were arrested on suspicion of assault, with the younger Mak also charged on suspicion of blackmail. The Mak brothers pleaded guilty to both charges in February 2014 and were incarcerated, with the prosecutor noting that the case had attracted a great deal of media attention and affected Hong Kong's image.

=== Post-production ===
Industrial Light & Magic's VFX supervisor Scott Farrar, who had also supervised the three prior films in the Transformers franchise, rendered the visual effects. He said the film contains about ninety minutes of visual effects (out of the movie's 165-minute length). Farrer said it was the biggest project, using the largest crew, of his career, and noted that over five hundred people had worked on it, using various facilities.

The nine different formats used in the film included IMAX film, IMAX digital, single-frame anamorphic film, GoPros, crash cams, Red cameras on 3Ality stereo 3D gigs, and red cameras for 3D.

=== Music ===
Steve Jablonsky composed the film's score, marking his sixth film collaboration with director Michael Bay, four of which are Transformers films. The soundtrack album sold more than 15,000 units worldwide. It is also the first Transformers film for which rock band Linkin Park did not contribute an original song, though their single "Until It's Gone" is included in the soundtrack of the video game based on the movie.

Skrillex worked on sound design for the film, having said that he was creating "the craziest Skrillex sounds I could ever make" and mentioned working on sounds for the Dinobots.

Imagine Dragons wrote a single specifically for the film itself, titled "Battle Cry" was featured in both the final battle scene and the credits as well as an unreleased single called "All For You". The track "Leave Planet Earth Alone" samples the drum beat of Battle Cry so that the former serves as an intro to the latter as the credits start, though this version is only present in the film; Battle Cry is not featured on the soundtrack album, and Leave Planet Earth Alone has a unique outro. No mashup version or otherwise is available for purchase. Imagine Dragons also worked with Steve Jablonsky and Hans Zimmer to contribute additional music to the film's score.

On June 30, 2014, an extended play was digitally released on iTunes, featuring four tracks as a teaser for the full official score, which features variations of the four themes. On July 4, 2014, the long play was released digitally on iTunes containing the full score of the film. The soundtrack album was released on CD by record label La-La Land Records on October 7, 2014.

On November 20, 2014, Steve Jablonsky released a statement via Facebook saying that the score would no longer be available on iTunes and other digital music stores after it had reached its limit of 15,000 units before re-use fees would have to be paid. Jablonsky personally expressed his own disappointment in the turn of events, hoping there would be a way to eventually re-release the score, along with the score to Transformers: Dark of the Moon, which had also been removed from iTunes and other digital music stores several months prior when it too reached the 15,000 unit limit.

== Release ==
The film had its world premiere in Hong Kong on June 19, with a live concert by Imagine Dragons.

=== Marketing ===
The first televised advertisement for Transformers: Age of Extinction aired during Super Bowl XLVIII. In a poll by Fandango, the spot was determined to be the most anticipated film trailer to be shown, receiving 48% of the vote in the poll. The first official teaser trailer was released on March 4, 2014. A viral marketing campaign was started for the film upon the teaser trailer's release. On March 30, 2014, a shortened version of the teaser trailer was aired during the season 4 finale of The Walking Dead. Another shortened version of the teaser trailer was aired during the 2014 MTV Movie Awards.

Chevrolet aired a commercial at the New York International Auto Show featuring General Motors vehicles with clips from the film, along with putting them on display.

Hasbro released an app on May 8 surrounding the film available for iOS and Android devices, allowing users to access exclusive material such as character biographies, images, and the interviews with the stars, among other things. A clip featuring never-before-seen scenes from the film and an interview with Imagine Dragons aired during The Voice on May 12, 2014.

DeNA and Hasbro teamed up to construct an official mobile video game for the film. The game was first announced on May 13, 2014, though, the title is still in active development. Also on this date, Oreo launched a marketing campaign to promote the film. This included a television commercial where a boy gives a wounded Optimus Prime an Oreo cookie to continue the fight.

An exclusive theatrical trailer debuted on May 15 on iTunes Movie Trailers at 12:01 am Pacific Standard Time. On May 21, 2014, two television spots appeared online, both containing new footage from the film. The film's viral campaign updated on May 22, showcasing all-new posters and realistic news reports of the damage done to Chicago from the third film. Three more television spots, all sporting new footage, appeared online on May 30, 2014.

Imagine Dragons's single for the film officially released online on June 2, 2014.

Jack Reynor and Nicola Peltz made multiple appearances in the Twin Cities on June 8, 2014. During an appearance on the Canadian version of The Morning Show, both Reynor and Peltz promised big things that would please fans. Kelsey Grammer made an appearance on The Late Show with David Letterman on June 9, 2014. During his visit, the very first clip from the film debuted, showcasing Grammer's character and Wahlberg's in a heated argument. During the first commercial break for the show, a brand new television spot aired. On June 10, 2014, two television spots appeared online, both containing extensive new footage from the film.

At the Nickelodeon Kids' Choice Awards on March 29, 2014, Mark Wahlberg, who stars in the film, hosted the event. There was also a transmission from Peter Cullen as Optimus Prime, and Nicola Peltz and Jack Reynor assembled with Wahlberg to take out cannons that fired slime.

Three more television spots appeared online on June 14, 2014, containing new footage of the Dinobots transforming and of Lockdown speaking. On June 17, a brand-new television spot aired on Comedy Central containing new footage. Another television spot appeared online on June 18, sporting new footage as well.

The film's unusual marketing strategy of letting people video the shooting of the film in select locations was the subject of film critic Kevin B. Lee's critical video essay Transformers: The Premake.

=== Video games ===
In February 2014, Transformers: Rise of the Dark Spark, developed by Edge of Reality, published by Activision was announced as a companion to the film. It was released in June 2014 for Microsoft Windows, Nintendo 3DS, PlayStation 3, PlayStation 4, Wii U, Xbox 360, and Xbox One.

In summer 2014, Rovio and Hasbro announced Angry Birds Transformers. The game has Transformers movie designs on multiple characters.

=== Home media ===
Transformers: Age of Extinction was released on Blu-ray, DVD, and Blu-ray 3D formats on September 30, 2014, in North America. The film's Blu-ray release was the first to feature a Dolby Atmos home theater soundtrack encoded with Dolby TrueHD. The film was also released on digital download through iTunes and Google Play on September 16, 2014. An Ultra HD Blu-ray release followed on December 5, 2017. The film grossed $65.3 million in home sales.

== Reception ==
=== Box office ===
==== Worldwide ====
Transformers: Age of Extinction grossed $245.4 million in the United States and Canada and $859.8 million in other countries for a worldwide total of $1.105 billion, against a budget of $210 million. On August 3, 2014, the film crossed the $1 billion mark, and is the only film of 2014 to do so at the box office worldwide. Deadline Hollywood calculated the net profit of the film to be $250.2 million, when factoring together all expenses and revenues for the film, making it the most profitable film of 2014. Worldwide, in its opening weekend, the film earned $302.1 million, which is the 28th-highest ever, the highest in 2014, and the second-largest for Paramount behind Transformers: Dark of the Moon ($382.4 million). It was the 10th-highest-grossing film worldwide and the highest-grossing film of 2014 during its theatrical run.

==== North America ====
Transformers: Age of Extinction is the seventh-highest-grossing film of 2014 in the U.S. and Canada. It was released on June 27, 2014, in across 4,233 theaters in North America. It earned $8.75 million from Thursday late-night run, which was the fifth-biggest of 2014. On Friday, the film grossed an additional $31.25 million bringing its total day gross to $41.6 million, including $10.7 million from IMAX 3D theaters. In its opening weekend, the film earned $100,038,390 (Note: The $100 million opening for Transformers: Age of Extinction is disputed within the industry. According to Rentrak—which has a direct line into the vast majority of theaters in the United States and Canada to track actual ticket sales—about 4,100 of the 4,233 theaters playing the film generated $95.9 million. The projected total from the Rentrak sales data would put the opening three-day weekend gross at around $97.5 million. For Transformers to have crossed the $100 million threshold, it would have needed to gross more than the nation-wide average in the theaters not tracked by Rentrak. Some media outlets have elected to go with the Rentrak figure.) setting an opening record of 2014 (overtaken by The Hunger Games: Mockingjay – Part 1 with $121.9 million), which is the fourth-highest opening for Paramount, and the fifth-highest for a film released in June. The opening-weekend audience was evenly split among those under and over the age of 25 (with 58%), male (64%), and under 18 (27%). The film remained at the summit for two consecutive weekends before being overtaken by Dawn of the Planet of the Apes in its third weekend. It also crossed the $200 million mark in its third weekend, becoming the fifth film of 2014 to do so. The film closed its theatrical run on October 9, 2014 and earned a total of $245,439,076, making it the fifth-highest-grossing film of 2014 in the U.S.

==== Outside North America ====
Outside North America, it is the highest-grossing film of 2014, and the sixth-highest-grossing film. Transformers: Age of Extinction earned $202.1 million in its opening weekend from 37 countries in 10,152 screens, which is 35% bigger than Dark of the Moon and marking the biggest international opening of 2014 (breaking X-Men: Days of Future Past's record set one month prior). It scored the biggest IMAX international opening weekend with $16.6 million from 266 theaters (overtaken by Jurassic World). The film topped the box office outside North America for four consecutive weekends despite coinciding with the 2014 FIFA World Cup before being overtaken by Dawn of the Planet of the Apes in its fifth weekend.

International openings of over $5 million occurred in South Korea ($21.7 million), Brazil ($16.5 million), Germany ($11.2 million), Australia ($9.6 million), France ($8.8 million), Taiwan ($8.1 million), Malaysia ($6.7 million), Japan ($6.4 million), the Philippines ($5.7 million), India ($5.35 million), Hong Kong ($5.1 million), and Italy ($5 million). In Russia, the film opened to number one with $21.7 million from 1,100 screens, which is the second-largest in the territory for which 3D accounted for 80% of the total gross. IMAX comprised $2.6 million of the total gross from 34 IMAX screens. Its biggest opener outside the U.S. was in China, where it scored one of the biggest non-North American openings of all time with $91.2 million from 4,400 screens, which was once the second-biggest opening of all time there. The film set an all-time IMAX opening record with $9.7 million. After five days of its release, Age of Extinction surpassed its North American run with $134.5 million. In China, the film earned an additional $50.9 million in its second weekend for a total of $212.8 million. In only 10 days of its release, it became the highest-grossing film in China with $222.74 million, thus overtaking Avatar's previous record. Adding to the film's revenue and popularity were product placements of Chinese brands edited into the movie specifically for Chinese audiences.

It became the highest-grossing film in China, with $301–$320 million (Note: A final number on Transformers: Age of Extinction tends to vary between the Paramount reported $301 million and local data that reported $320 million.) in revenue surpassing 2009's record set by Avatar ($204 million), until it was surpassed by Furious 7 in 2015 over $390 million. It is also the first movie in China to gross more than $300 million at the box office. A large part of the success in China has been attributed to the large fan base there and because of its accompanying animated TV series—which ran during the 1980s and 1990—was one of the highest-quality TV programs at that time which resulted in many children getting attached to it. Transformers toy merchandising was one of the first successful cases by a foreign company in China at its time, its line of transforming robot toys was highly sought-after, especially by boys.

At the end of its theatrical run outside North America, the film earned $858,600,000 which is 77.8% of its total gross. In total earnings, the highest revenue came from China ($301 million), Russia ($45.2 million), South Korea ($43.3 million), Germany ($38.2 million), Mexico ($33.5 million), the UK ($33.1 million) and Australia ($24.9 million).

==== Authenticity of North American box office opening weekend ====
The $100 million opening announced by Paramount for Transformers: Age of Extinction received skepticism within the film industry. According to Rentrak—which has a direct line into the vast majority of theaters in the United States and Canada to track actual ticket sales—about 4,100 of the 4,233 theaters playing the film generated $95.9 million. The projected total from the Rentrak sales data would put the opening three-day weekend gross at around $97.5 million. For Transformers to have crossed the $100 million threshold, it would have needed to gross more than the nationwide average in the theaters not tracked by Rentrak. Some media outlets elected to go with the Rentrak figure over Paramount's.

=== Critical response ===
On Rotten Tomatoes, Transformers: Age of Extinction has an approval rating of 18% based on 212 reviews and an average rating of 4/10. The site's critical consensus reads, "With the fourth installment in Michael Bay's blockbuster Transformers franchise, nothing is in disguise: Fans of loud, effects-driven action will find satisfaction, and all others need not apply." On Metacritic, the film has a score of 32 out of 100 based on 38 critics, indicating "generally unfavorable reviews". Audiences polled by CinemaScore gave the film an average grade of "A−" on an A+ to F scale.

Richard Roeper gave the film a "D", saying that "the longer the movie goes on, the less interesting it becomes; it just wears you down. As we were finally reaching the 165-minute mark, all that noise and fury was about as exciting as the special effects in an Ed Wood movie." Peter Travers of Rolling Stone gave the film zero out of four stars, calling it "the worst and most worthless Transformers movie yet." A. O. Scott of The New York Times said in his review that "The story is scaffolding for the action and like every other standing structure, it is wrecked in a thunderous shower of metal, glass, masonry, and earth."

Clarence Tsui of The Hollywood Reporter commented on his review that it "barely skirts the idea that humankind and planet Earth are about to be totally annihilated. What is extinguished is the audience's consciousness after being bombarded for nearly three hours with overwrought emotions ('There's a missile in the living room!' Tessa hollers — twice), bad one-liners, and battles that rarely rise above the banal. A trio of editors make a technical marvel out of the fight scenes, but can do little to link the story's multiple threads into something coherent." Roth Cornet of IGN gave the film a score of 6.3 out of 10, praising the "slightly darker/surprising tone and Lockdown" and his ship while criticizing the "logic/script issues and long running time." Joe Neumaier of the New York Daily News gave the film one out of five stars, commenting that "If the 'human scenes' all reek of adolescent dialogue and dopey snark masquerading as character development, it's a toss-up if that's better or worse than seeing clattering collections of caliginous junk."

Variety called the movie "a splendidly patriotic film, if you happen to be Chinese." They lamented the film's slipshod production and said that Michael Bay "crossed the line into self-parody".

=== Accolades ===
Award	Category	Recipients	Result	Ref.
2014 Teen Choice Awards	Choice Movie: Villain	Kelsey Grammer	Nominated	
2014 Teen Choice Awards	Choice Movie: Breakout Star	Nicola Peltz	Nominated	
2014 Teen Choice Awards	Choice Summer Movie	Transformers: Age of Extinction	Nominated	
2014 Teen Choice Awards	Choice Summer Movie Star	Mark Wahlberg	Nominated	
2014 Golden Trailer Awards	Best Summer 2014 Blockbuster Trailer	Paramount Pictures and Creative Buzz Industries	Nominated	
2014 Hollywood Film Awards	Best Visual Effects of the Year	Scott Farrar	Won	
2014 Houston Film Critics Society Awards	Worst Film	Transformers: Age of Extinction	Nominated	
2015 Annie Awards	Outstanding Achievement, Animated Effects in a Live Action Production	Michael Balog, Jim Van Allen, Rick Hankins, and John Hansen	Nominated	
2015 Satellite Awards	Best Visual Effects	John Frazier, Patrick Tubach, Scott Benza, and Scott Farrar	Nominated	
2015 Satellite Awards	Best Sound (Editing & Mixing)	Erik Aadahl, Ethan Van Der Ryn, and Peter J. Devlin	Nominated	
2015 Visual Effects Society Awards	Outstanding Models in any Motion Media Project	Landis Fields, John Goodson, Anthony Rispoli, Dae Han for "Knightship"	Nominated	
2015 Golden Raspberry Awards	Worst Picture	Transformers: Age of Extinction	Nominated	
2015 Golden Raspberry Awards	Worst Director	Michael Bay	Won	
2015 Golden Raspberry Awards	Worst Supporting Actor	Kelsey Grammer (also for The Expendables 3, Legends of Oz: Dorothy's Return, and Think Like a Man Too)	Won	
2015 Golden Raspberry Awards	Worst Supporting Actress	Nicola Peltz	Nominated	
2015 Golden Raspberry Awards	Worst Screenplay	Ehren Kruger	Nominated	
2015 Golden Raspberry Awards	Worst Prequel, Remake, Rip-off or Sequel	Transformers: Age of Extinction	Nominated	
2015 Golden Raspberry Awards	Worst Screen Combo	Transformers: Age of Extinction	Nominated	

== Sequel ==
The sequel, titled The Last Knight, was released on June 21, 2017, to both critical and commercial failure, with Bay stating it was his final entry of the series.
