= Sarah Elizabeth Ray =

American civil rights activist

Sarah Elizabeth Ray (also known as Lizz Haskell; 1921–2006) was an African American civil rights activist who in 1945 was denied entry on SS Columbia, a ferry operated by the Bob-Lo Excursion Company. She initiated a legal battle against the company via the NAACP which eventually ended up being processed by the United States Supreme Court. The court ruled in Ray's favor, setting her case as a precursor to Brown v. Board of Education. After the Bob-Lo Co. Vs. Michigan court case, she went on to create the Action House in Detroit which helped to empower Black youth in the city and offered spaces for recreational activities. She was posthumously inducted into the Michigan Women's Hall of Fame in 2021.

== Early life and education ==
Ray was born in 1921 in Wauhatchie, Tennessee, to a family of thirteen. She moved to Detroit shortly after her marriage at the age of twenty. Growing up outside of Chattanooga, Ray became passionate about extending educational opportunities to Black youth from a young age, having seen the ways Black families within her own community were underserved. After moving to Detroit, Ray worked tirelessly on pursuing her education. She attended night school, allowing her to gain admission to Wayne University (now Wayne State University). After spending a year at Wayne, she went on to work for the Detroit Ordinance Department, through which she was able to attend secretarial school, graduating in 1945 from Commerce High School in a class of 40 students where she was the only Black woman.

== Boblo boat incident ==
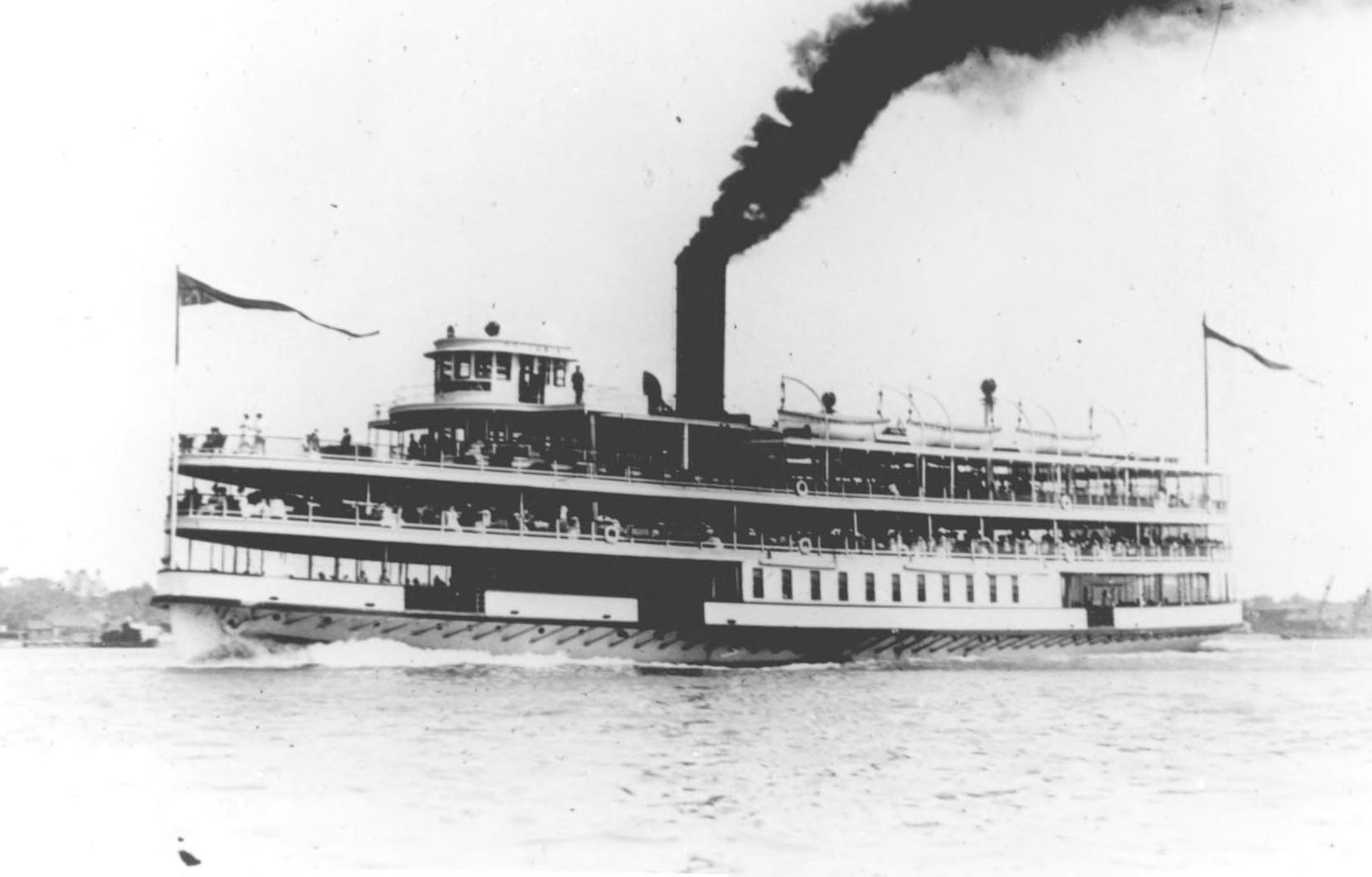
SS Columbia in 1905

In June 1945 after her graduation from secretarial school, Ray along with her peers planned a trip to Bois Blanc Island using ferries employed by the Bob-Lo Excursion Company. Ray had purchased tickets prior to the trip, but after boarding the ferry, she was denied admittance due to her race. The company had an explicit policy of not allowing "colored-people" to board their ferries. Initially, Ray refused to deboard the SS Columbia but when faced with the option of being forcibly removed from the ferry, she decided to leave by her own free will. Although she was offered a refund of the value of her ticket, she decided to seek legal counsel from the NAACP instead.

The company was then charged by the Recorder's Court of Detroit for wrongful discrimination against Ray and for violation of the Michigan Civil Rights Act. The court fined the company a total of $25 and the company appealed. This allowed the case to be carried over to the Michigan Supreme Court and then later on the United States Supreme Court, with both courts reaffirming the decision of the local court. Ray's case went on to set a precedent that both defined legalities in the regulation of foreign commerce along with prohibiting discrimination in the usage of transport vessels.

== Community activism ==
Following the 1967 Detroit riot, Ray went on to create Action House, a community center created out of the growing need of interracial solidarity amidst a growing racially charged society. Ray noted the rising tensions left behind by the riots and hence felt the need to create a youth center to promote recreational activities that would also maintain racial harmony within her neighborhood. Action House went to spearhead numerous initiatives that allowed Black youth to gain educational counselling, access to food and recreation spaces to name a few. Ray went on to become the director of teaching, communications and problem solving for Action House, spearheading numerous fundraisers to allow the center to stay afloat. Ray was also avidly engaged in political discourse, often writing small columns in local newspapers to call to attention various political and social issues affecting her community.

== Attention in media ==
In 2020, filmmaker Aaron Schllinger, in collaboration with author Desiree Cooper, memorialized Ray's legacy as a civil rights activist through the creation of a documentary titled Detroit's Other Rosa Parks. Schllinger highlighted Ray's role in integrating the ferry system for Bob-Lo rides along with setting a legal precedent that went on to shape the decisions that happened in Brown vs. Board of Education. The documentary helped spark conversations regarding Ray's role in civil rights along with showcasing the role Black women have played in the fight for racial equality.

== Personal life ==
After divorcing her first husband, Ray went on to marry Raphael Haskell, a Jewish activist with whom she opened Action House, a community center that provided community-based aid to Black youth within Detroit. Shortly after marrying her husband, Ray changed her name to Elizabeth Haskell, later being known as simply "Lizz Haskell" as she continued her work as a community activist with Action House. She died in her home in 2006, seven years after her husband died in a hit-and-run case.
