= SS Columbia (1902 steamboat) =

Excursion steamer

Steamer Columbia
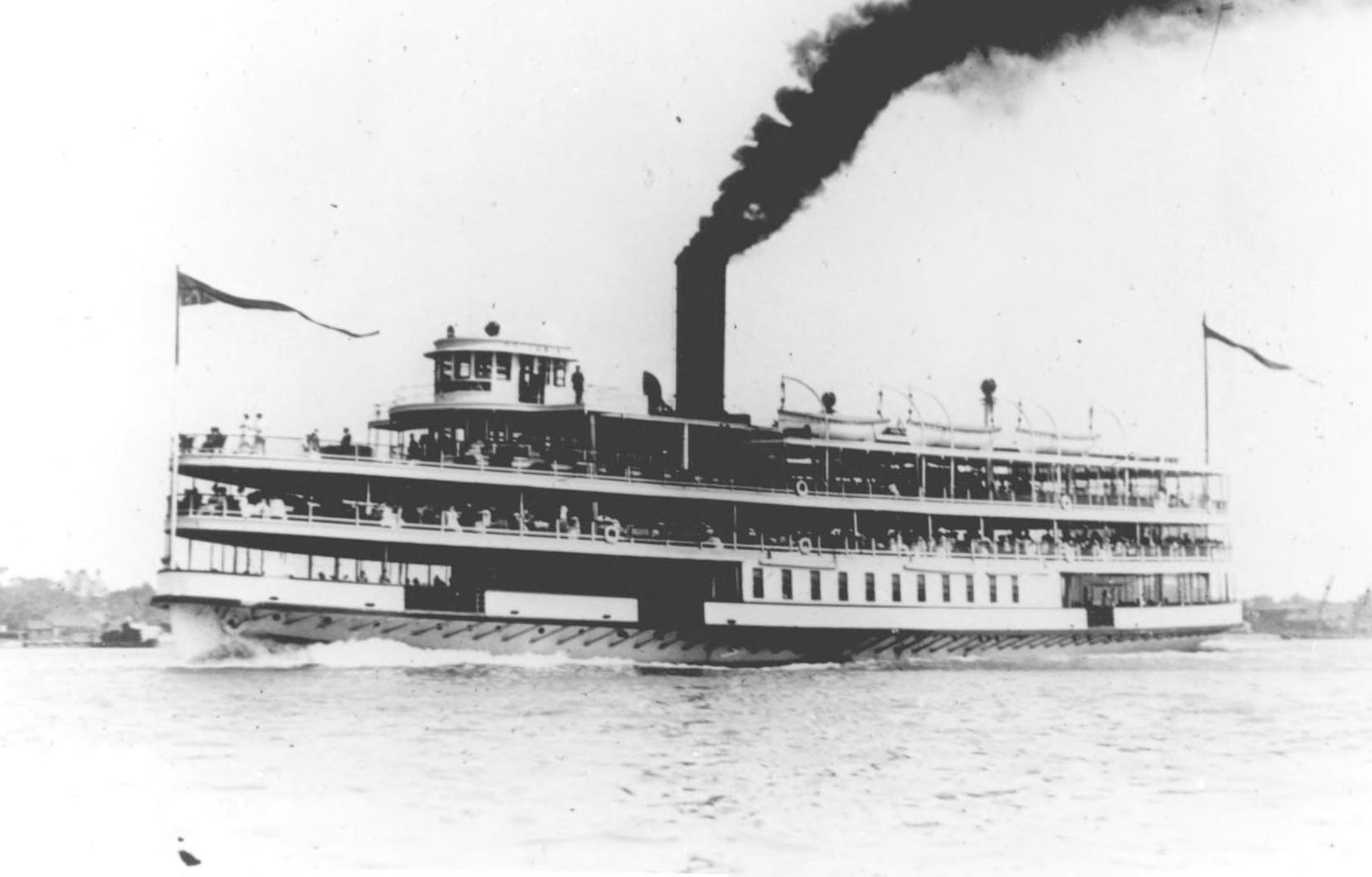
- Columbia c.1910. From Columbia's nomination to the National Register.

History
- Name: Columbia
- Port of registry: USA
- Route: Detroit–Bob-Lo Island
- Ordered: January, 1902
- Builder: Detroit Shipbuilding Co.
- Yard number: 148
- Launched: 1902
- In service: May 10, 1902
- Out of service: 1991
- Status: under restoration

General characteristics
- Type: excursion steamer
- Tonnage: 968 (gross) 549 (net)
- Length: 207.67 ft (63.30 m)
- Beam: 45 ft (14 m)
- Draft: 12.5 ft (3.8 m)
- Depth: 17.79 ft (5.42 m)
- Installed power: Bunker C in Scotch boilers
- Propulsion: Triple-expansion reciprocating steam engine
- Speed: Originally up to 21 mph
- Columbia (Excursion Steamer)
- U.S. National Register of Historic Places
- U.S. National Historic Landmark
- Location within New York Location within the United States
- Location: Buffalo, New York
- Coordinates: 42.860878°N 78.862312°W
- Area: less than one acre
- Built: 1902
- Architect: Frank E. Kirby
- NRHP reference No.: 79001171

Significant dates
- Added to NRHP: 2 November 1979
- Designated NHL: 6 July 1992

SS Columbia is one of the last remaining excursion steamships from the turn of the 20th century in existence, the other being her running mate and sister ship SS Ste. Claire which was badly damaged in a fire in 2018. Both were designed by Frank E. Kirby and Louis O. Keil, interior designer. Columbia was listed on the National Register of Historic Places in 1979, and was designated a National Historic Landmark in 1992. As of 2019, the vessel is docked at Silo City in Buffalo, New York while work is being done to rehabilitate it. However as of February 2024 the restoration group's website was offline and archived images showed no updates since 2021. In March 2024 a local news and events site described the vessel as "at risk" and their social media pages were offline.

== History ==
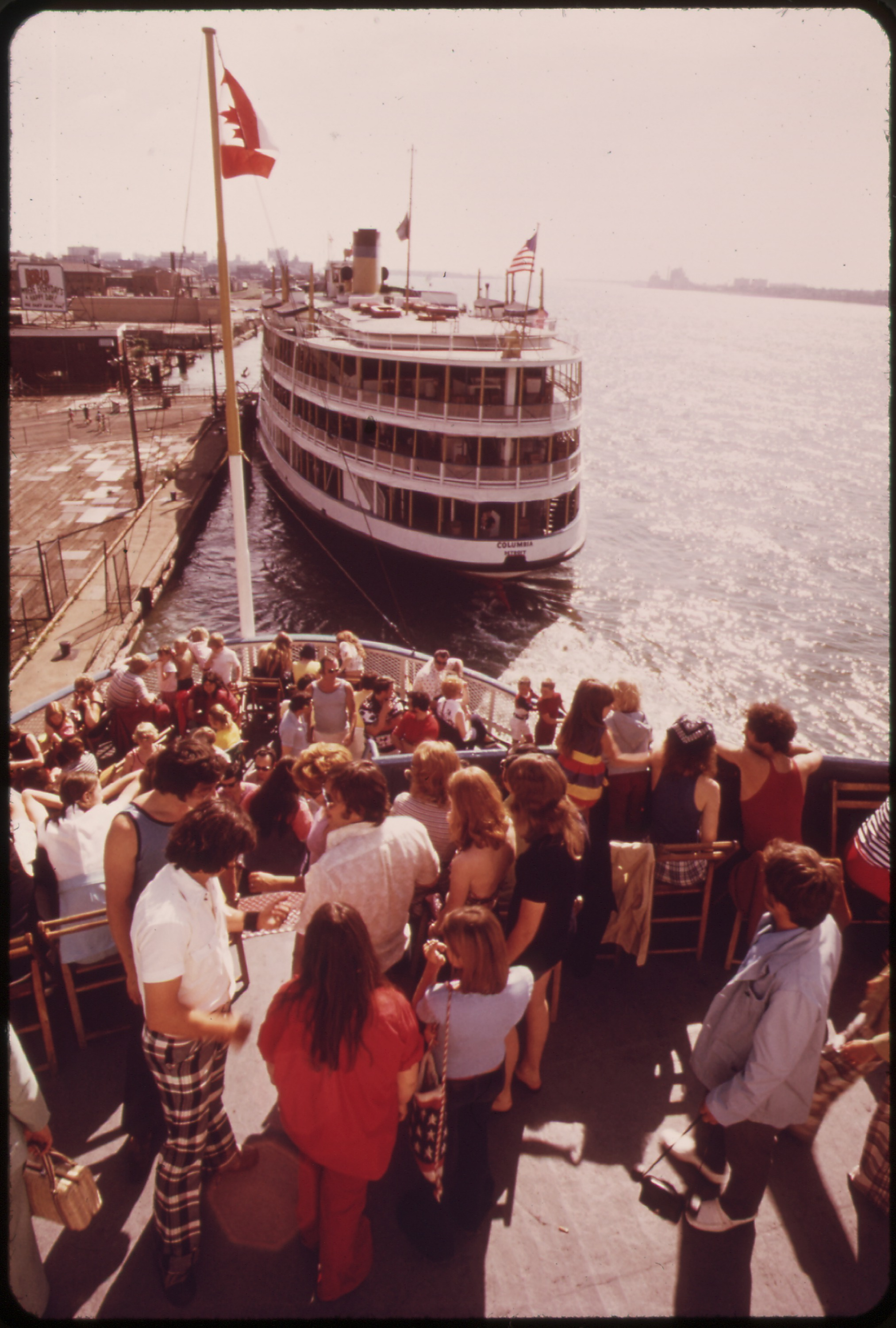
Columbia at Detroit in 1973, taken from deck of sister ship, Ste. Claire

Columbia was built in Wyandotte, Michigan, in 1902, and Ste. Claire was built in Toledo, Ohio, in 1910. The naval architect Frank Kirby designed a new steel support system for Columbia that allowed for the spans needed for a dance floor, thus Columbia was the first steamboat in the US with a proper ballroom. Columbia influenced the design of later excursion steamers including Americana, Canadiana, Ste. Claire, Put-in-bay, and Peter Stuyvesant, throughout the US. Columbia and Ste. Claire were originally joined by a third, SS Britannia, built in 1906. During their heyday, Columbia and Ste. Claire sailed down the Detroit River from downtown Detroit to Bois Blanc Island, an Ontario island that was home to an amusement park built as a destination for the steamers. During the summer, the ship's triple decks would be filled with passengers enjoying the 90-minute, 18-mile (29 km) boat ride to the Boblo Island Amusement Park. Both ships featured music and dancing, and snack bars. The ships became icons on the Detroit River and were greatly loved by the people of Detroit and Windsor, Ontario, Canada.

Columbia became the setting for an historic Civil Rights battle in 1945 when a young African American woman named Sarah Elizabeth Ray joined her classmates for a celebratory graduation cruise aboard the ship. Officers of the Boblo Excursion company then approached Ray and told her she had to leave due to her race. When they threatened her with physical removal, she agreed to leave but not before throwing the proffered fare refund back at them and getting their names. Ray enlisted the help of the NAACP in filing a complaint, and the State of Michigan charged the company with violating its civil rights law. The company claimed due to their routes crossing the Canada–US border that they were engaged in international commerce and were not subject to state regulations. Michigan won in the local courts and then in state court and ultimately in the US Supreme court.

== Deterioration and restoration ==
Due to competition from nearby Cedar Point, attendance at Bob-lo Island declined. In 1990, the company then operating Bob-lo Island said the steamers were too much to handle and were becoming a burden on the company's finances. The summer of 1991 was the last for Columbia and Ste. Claire and they were sold as a pair in the federal bankruptcy court in Minneapolis in November, 1991. In 1993, Bob-lo Island was closed and sold to real estate developers. The vessels were docked near the Great Lakes Steel Company in Ecorse, Michigan, where they sat unprotected from the harsh Michigan winters. They were auctioned in foreclosure in 1996 and by 2000, both steamers were showing deterioration with chipped paint, rotting wood, and holes in the decks.

In 2004 a team led by the Detroit Riverfront Conservancy had Columbia "shrink-wrapped" to reduce further deterioration while they considered purchase and restoration. However, in early 2006, given budgetary constraints they removed themselves from consideration. Later that year, with the assistance of National Trust for Historic Preservation Columbia was awarded to a New York-based non-profit group, "The S.S. Columbia Project", for restoration to active service as an educational, cultural, and Heritage tourism resource for use on the Hudson River.

The plan for the ship's restoration and re-use was based on the European model of maritime preservation where the ship's restoration is funded through a non profit capital campaign and then the ship's operations are funded through earned revenues. Plans for the restored ship included daily excursions from the west side of Manhattan to the communities of the Hudson Valley.

Temporary alterations on both steamers, Columbia and Ste. Clair, were made for the 2014 feature film Transformers: Age of Extinction.

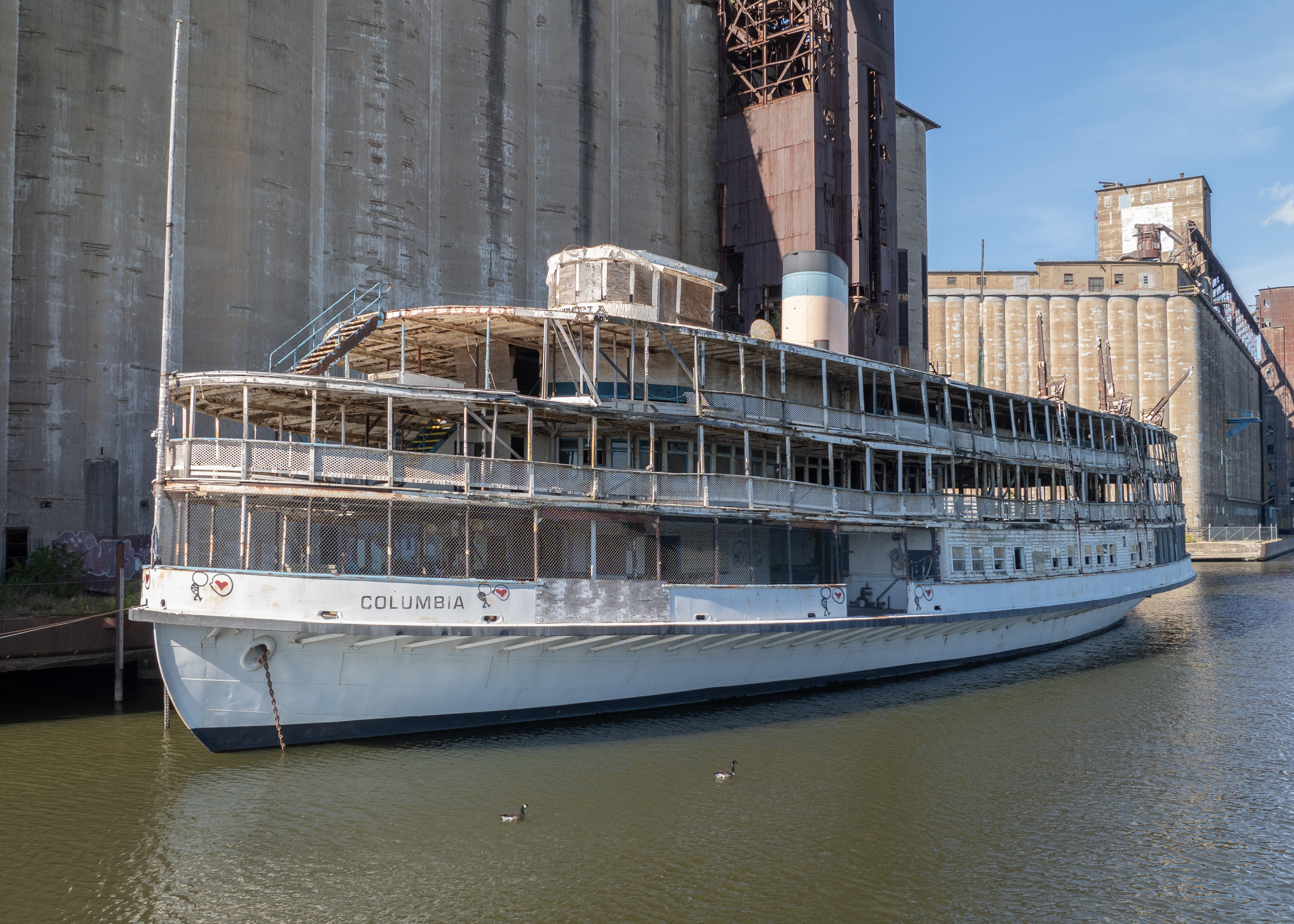
The Columbia on the Buffalo River in October, 2024.

In September 2014, Columbia was towed from Detroit to Toledo, Ohio, for dry docking in preparation for moving to New York. In September 2015, she was moved to Buffalo, New York, where she is being prepared for an eventual move to the Hudson River.

The video for the 2017 single "Score The Sky" by the UK band Lost Horizons was filmed at locations including the SS Columbia.

As of December 2024 the official web site was off-line to public viewing.

== See also ==
- Boblo Island Amusement Park
- Sarah Elizabeth Ray
