= SS Ste. Claire =

Steamship

Ste. Claire
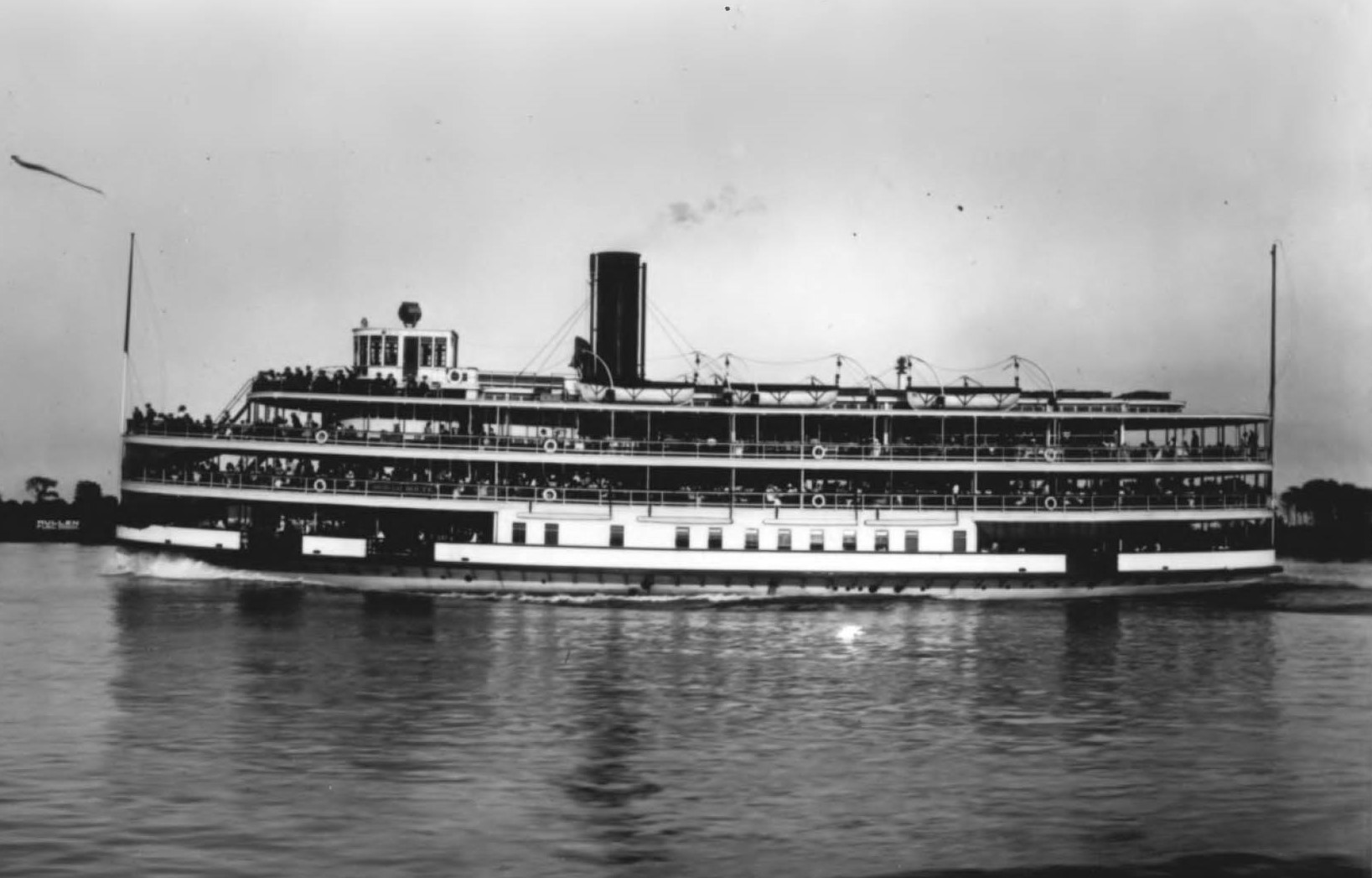

History
- Name: Ste. Claire
- Operator: Detroit & Windsor Ferry Company
- Builder: Toledo Shipbuilding Company
- Yard number: Hull 116
- Launched: 7 May 1910
- Fate: Damaged by fire on 6 July 2018, Under restoration
- Status: Under restoration

General characteristics
- Tonnage: 870 (gross), 507 (net)
- Length: 190 ft (58 m)
- Beam: 50 ft (15 m)
- Draft: 14.5 ft (4.4 m)
- Depth: 17.3 ft (5.3 m)
- Installed power: Triple expansion reciprocating steam engine
- Ste. Claire (steamer)
- Formerly listed on the U.S. National Register of Historic Places
- Former U.S. National Historic Landmark
- Interactive map
- Location: Riverside Marina, 11000 Freud St., Detroit
- Coordinates: 42°21′18″N 82°57′54″W
- Built: 1910
- Architect: Frank E. Kirby, Toledo Shipbuilding Co.
- NRHP reference No.: 79001177

Significant dates
- Added to NRHP: November 2, 1979
- Designated NHL: July 6, 1992
- Removed from NRHP: December 20, 2023
- Delisted NHL: December 11, 2023

SS Ste. Claire is a steamer located in Detroit, Michigan. Built in 1910, she was one of the last propeller-driven excursion steamers to be operated on the Great Lakes. She was declared a US National Historic Landmark in 1992. In 2018, a devastating fire destroyed the upper decks, leaving only the steel structure. The ship was delisted as a National Historic Landmark and from the National Register of Historic Places in 2023.

== History ==
The Detroit, Belle Isle, & Windsor Ferry Company was incorporated in 1881 to provide ferry service between Detroit, Windsor, Ontario, and Detroit's Belle Isle Park. In 1898, the company began leasing Bois Blanc Island (later known as "Bob-Lo") and began offering ferry service to the island. Bois Blanc became a popular day trip destination, with picnic grounds, a small amusement area, dancing and other services. In 1901, the company purchased a large part of the island. Service to Bob-Lo became so popular that in 1902, the company hired Frank E. Kirby to design a passenger excursion steamer, SS Columbia. However, passenger volume continued to increase, and soon the Detroit, Belle Isle, & Windsor Ferry Company commissioned another, slightly smaller steamer. This ship was again designed by Frank E. Kirby, and constructed at the Toledo Shipbuilding Company.

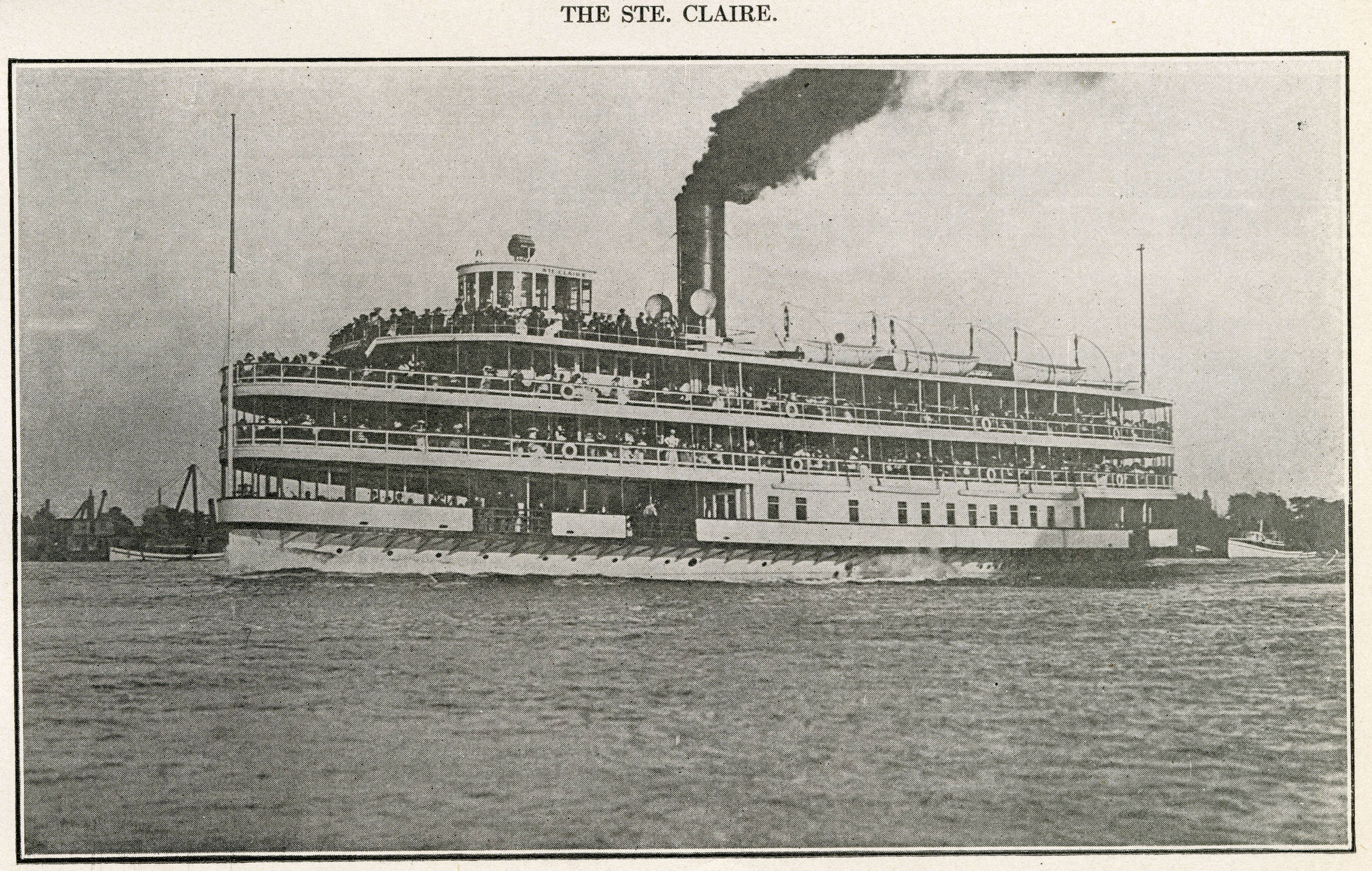
The Ste. Claire in a 1912 advertisement for the Toledo Shipbuilding Company

The Ste. Claire was launched at Toledo Shipbuilding Company in 1910, and entered service later that year between Detroit and Bob-Lo Island. In 1911, the Detroit, Belle Isle, & Windsor Ferry Company was reorganized as the Detroit and Windsor Ferry Company. However, the construction in the 1920s of the Ambassador Bridge and the Detroit–Windsor Tunnel between Detroit and Windsor, and the MacArthur Bridge to Belle Isle drastically reduced the company's service, and by the late 1930s their only activity was the Detroit-Bob-Lo Island line. In the early 1940s, the company was renamed simply the "Bob-Lo Excursion Company."

The excursion service and Boblo Island Amusement Park were sold in the 1940s, and again in 1979. However, the Ste. Claire continued operating between Detroit and Bob-Lo Island until 1991, a run of 81 years. She was declared a US National Historic Landmark in 1992. After the island park closed, she was sold to a commercial firm and fell into disrepair.

In 2003 she was towed to Toledo, Ohio for restoration. In 2015, the vessel was towed to the former Detroit Lime Dock on the Rouge River, while her restoration remained in limbo.

Temporary alterations to both Columbia and Ste. Claire were made for the 2014 feature film Transformers: Age of Extinction.

The Saint Claire was engulfed in an accidental fire while docked on the Detroit River on July 6, 2018. The fire could not be contained and destroyed the historic mahogany woodwork and upper decks. "Yeah, she's 110 years old, but she's well-built and she survived," said boat co-owner, Ron Kattoo. "We are at the point in restoration to where it was a steel skeleton structure ready to be rebuilt." As of 2019, the vessel is docked at Riverside Marina in Detroit. As a result of the fire, the ship was delisted as a National Historic Landmark and the National Register of Historic Places in 2023.

== Description ==
The Ste. Claire is a propeller-driven excursion steamer with a riveted steel hull and a wooden superstructure strengthened with steel members. The hull is 190 feet (58 m) long, 50 feet (15 m) wide, and 17.3 feet (5.3 m) in molded depth. She is powered by a triple expansion reciprocating steam engine with Scotch boilers. The main deck overhangs the hull, and the open decks above are rounded at the bow, a characteristic of the Bob-Lo fleet.

Before the fire that destroyed any original wood that had not been removed, it had a main staircase in the center of the main deck that led to the upper decks. A second stair underneath led down to the crew spaces in the hull. On either side of the main stair were gangplank openings for loading passengers. Forward of the stair was a large open deck space. Aft of the stair, a passageway ran across the vessel, aft of which is the stack casing and a well that opened down into the engine room, where the main engine could be seen by passengers on the main deck. Food service counters were placed at the aft end of the main deck, surrounded by open spaces, and a pair of stairs leading to decks above. Amidships, public restrooms and crews quarters were placed on either side of the ship.

The main staircase led upward to the main cabin on the second deck. The cabin was finished in mahogany with a cream-painted beamed ceiling. Aft of the cabin was a dance floor. The main cabin had doors out to open spaces forward and aft. The main stair led upward to another, smaller cabin on the third deck. Doors here led to the open deck and to a "beer garden" located above the dance floor. A final stair on the open deck led to the top deck. Public access to the top deck was limited; the area also included the pilot house and lifeboat storage.

== See also ==
- SS Columbia
- List of National Historic Landmarks in Michigan
