= Hornet (roller coaster) =

Steel roller coaster in Texas

- Previously known as Nightmare at Boblo Island Amusement Park (1988-1993); Mayan Mindbender at Six Flags AstroWorld (1995-2005)
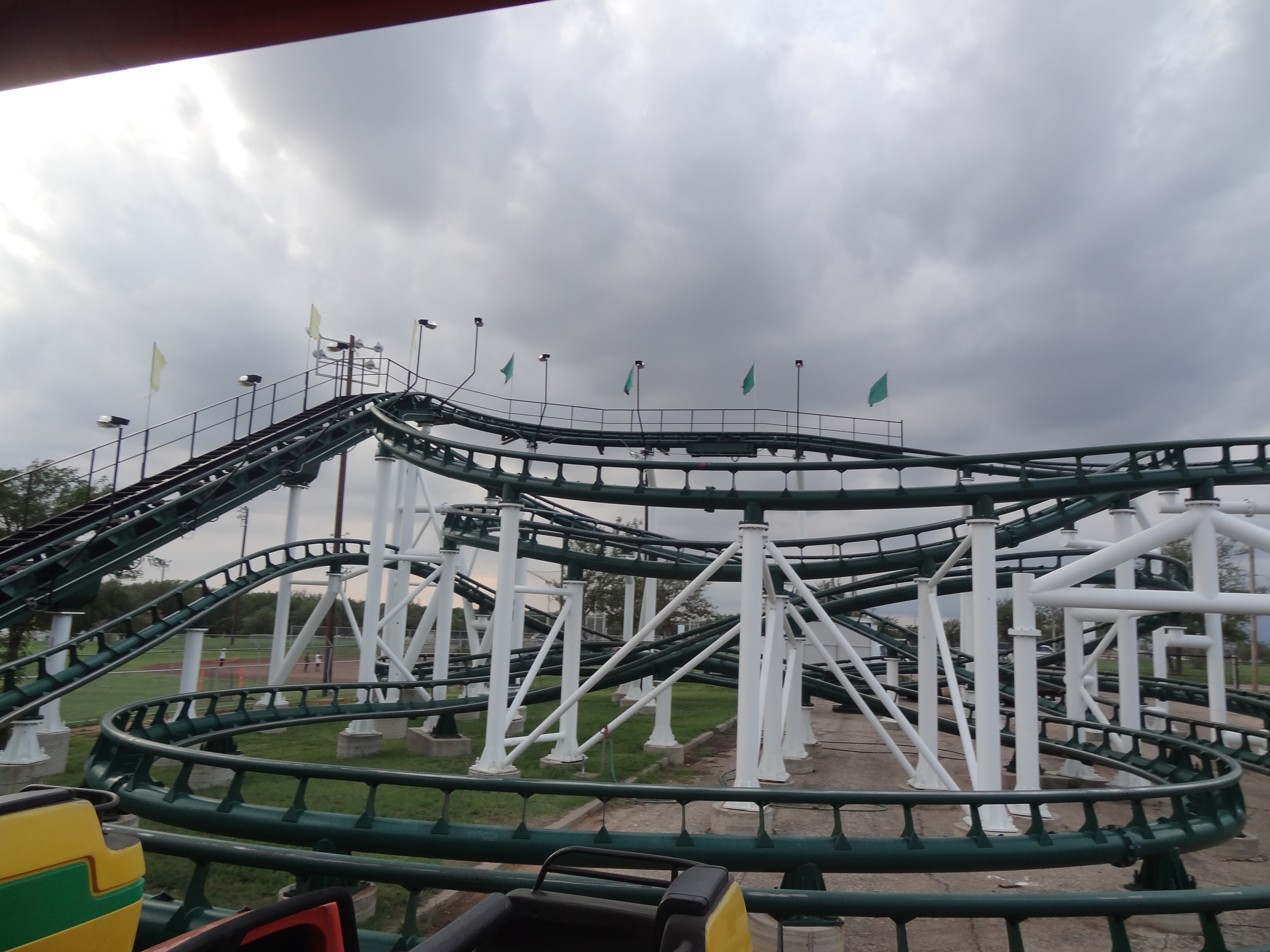

Wonderland Park
- Coordinates: 35.2442°N 101.8330°W
- Status: Operating
- Opening date: June 3, 2009

Six Flags AstroWorld
- Park section: Oriental Corner
- Coordinates: 29.6763°N 95.4047°W
- Status: Removed
- Opening date: May 13, 1995
- Closing date: October 30, 2005

Boblo Island
- Coordinates: 42.096°N 83.121°W
- Status: Removed
- Opening date: 1988
- Closing date: 1993

General statistics
- Type: Steel – Enclosed
- Manufacturer: Vekoma
- Model: Twister roller coaster
- Lift/launch system: Chain lift hill
- Height: 28 ft (8.5 m)
- Length: 1,148 ft (350 m)
- Inversions: 0
- Duration: 1:30
- Height restriction: 42 in (107 cm)
- Hornet at RCDB

Hornet is a family twister roller coaster located at Wonderland Park in Amarillo, Texas. It was previously enclosed and located at Six Flags AstroWorld, as well as at Boblo Island Amusement Park.

== History ==
The ride originally debuted at Boblo Island Amusement Park as an indoor all dark roller coaster named Nightmare. When that park closed, it was relocated to Six Flags AstroWorld and renamed Mayan Mindbender. The Mayan Mindbender was an indoor ride themed to a pyramid structure. After AstroWorld closed at the end of the 2005 season, the ride moved again to Wonderland Park in Amarillo, Texas, where it reopened in 2009, as Hornet.
