= Bois Blanc Island (Ontario) =

Island in Ontario, Canada

Nickname: Boblo Island
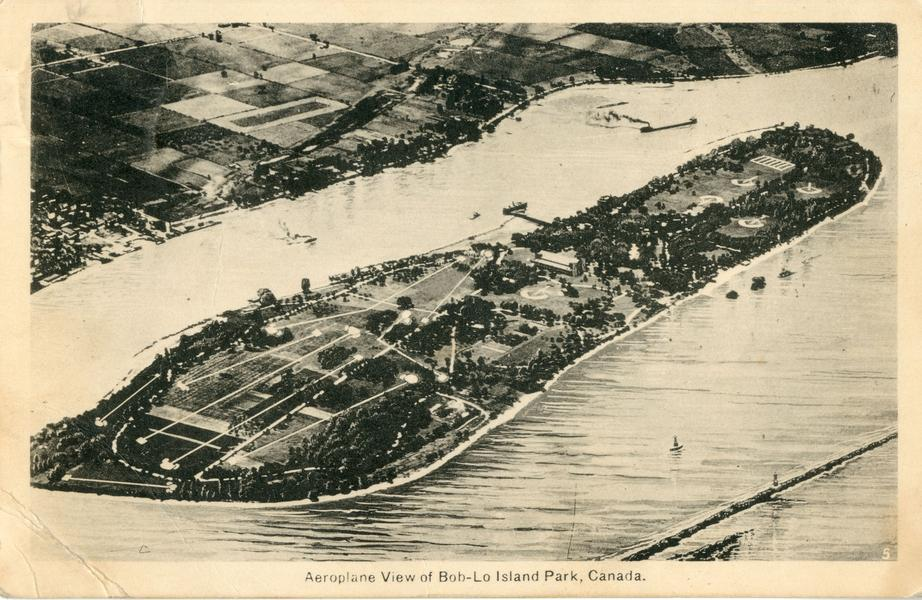
- Aerial view of Boblo Island (1941)

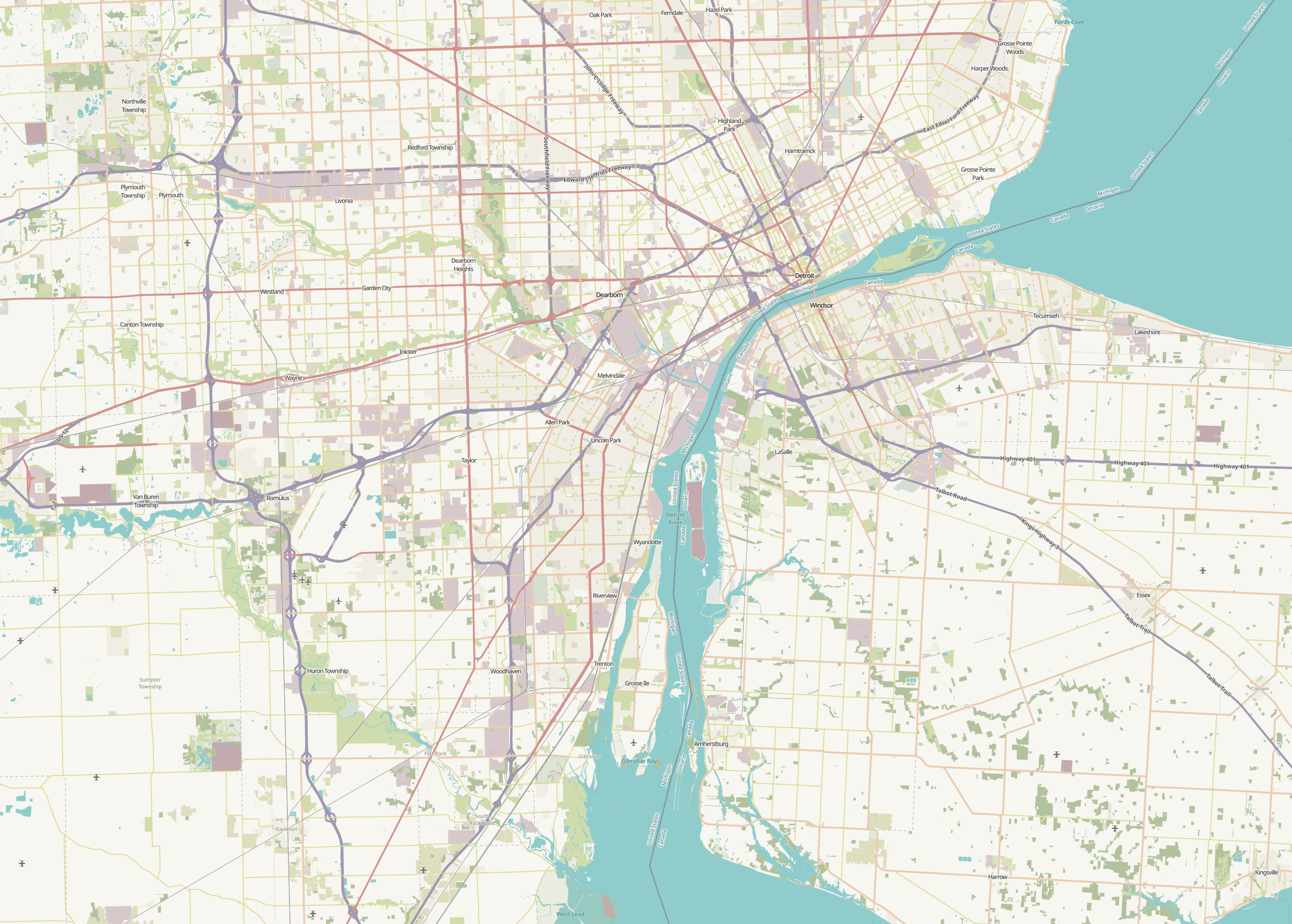
- Location within the province of Ontario Bois Blanc Island (Ontario) (Ontario)

Geography
- Location: Detroit River
- Coordinates: 42°05′44″N 83°07′14″W
- Area: 1.10 km^{2} (0.42 sq mi)

Administration
- Canada
- Province: Ontario
- County: Essex
- City: Amherstburg

Additional information
- Time zone: EST (UTC-5)
  - Summer (DST): EDT (UTC-4)

Bois Blanc Island, commonly referred to as Boblo Island, is an island in the Detroit River on the Canadian side of the border and is part of Amherstburg, Ontario. The island is about 4.0 kilometres (2.5 mi) long, 0.80 km (0.5 mi) wide and 110 hectares (272 acres) in size.

The main northbound shipping channel of the Detroit River currently lies between Boblo Island and the Amherstburg mainland. A stone lighthouse was built in 1836 on the southern tip of Boblo Island which marks the historical beginning of the Detroit River navigation channel for ships travelling upriver from Lake Erie in more modern times. It is now part of the Bois Blanc Island Lighthouse and Blockhouse.

== History ==
The island had strategic importance when Fort Amherstburg (now Fort Malden) was built in 1796 to guard passage along the Detroit River after Detroit, Michigan, was turned over to the Americans. Guns from the fort could reach the island across the navigable waters and hence secured the river.

Its association with the ancient Sauk Trail, the earliest European reference made about the island in 1718, which describes 70 First Nation families peacefully farming the fertile land, later it became the place where French Catholics had a mission for the Wyandot (Wendat) First Nation (also known as "the Huron Indians") in the 18th century, the location of the site of the headquarters for the Shawnee Chief Tecumseh ("Shooting Star") the leader of a large tribal confederacy (known as Tecumseh's Confederacy), during the War of 1812, and it was the location of the invasion point for 60 Canadian "Patriots" on January 8, 1838 during the Upper Canada Rebellion. It also served as the stepping stone for numerous individuals on the Underground Railroad to Canada. One estimate puts 30,000 people as having had crossed over between 1834 and 1860. In 1875, a set of range lights were constructed on the island by the Canadian government. By 1879, it was used as a summer home by McKee Rankin and Kitty Blanchard.

== Boblo Island Amusement Park ==
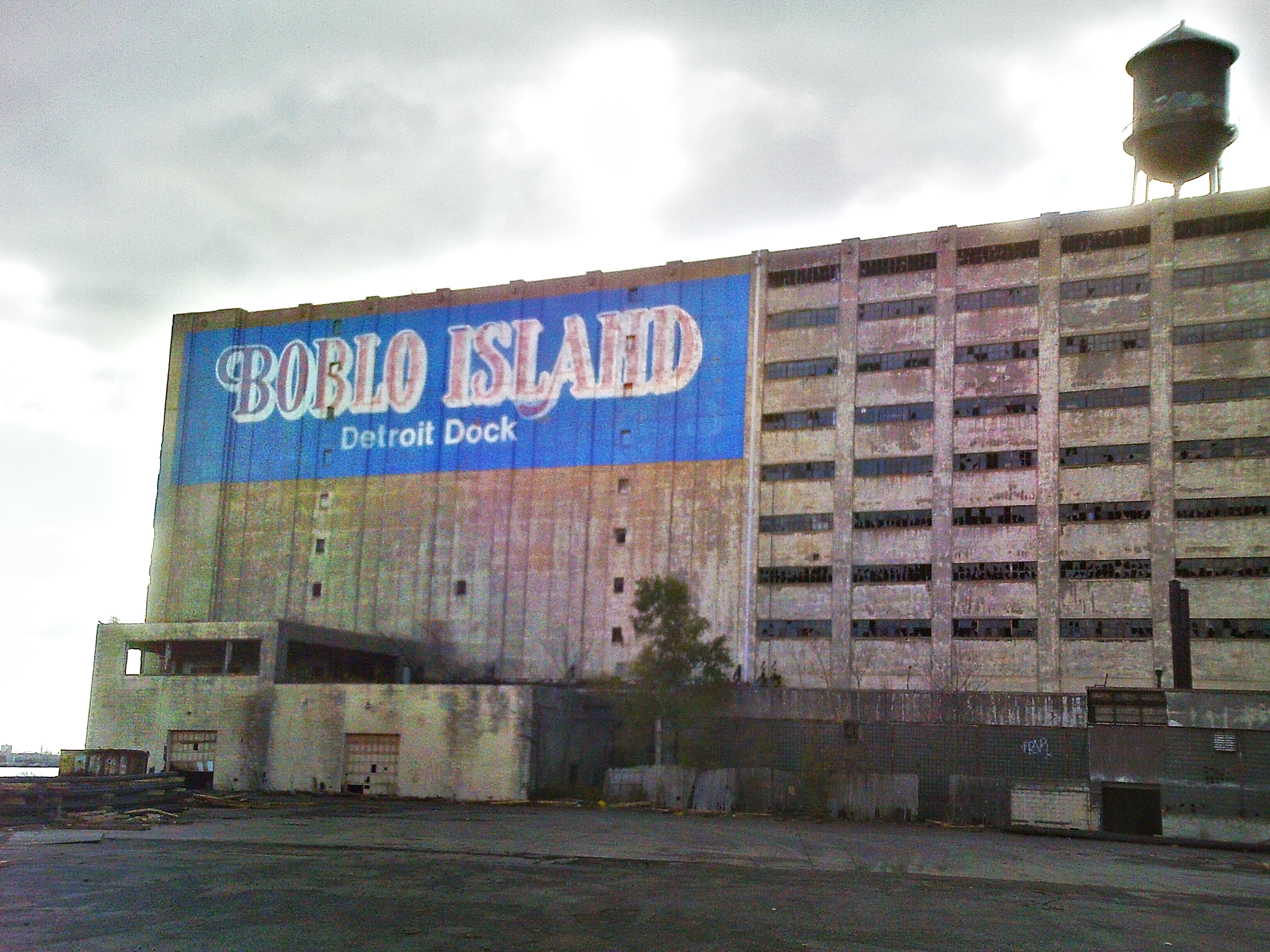
The abandoned Boblo Island Detroit Dock building in Detroit in 2010

Boblo is known regionally as the former home of the Boblo Island Amusement Park, which began operation in 1898 and closed in 1993. The Nightmare, Falling Star, Wild Mouse, Sky Streak and Screamer were the signature rides.

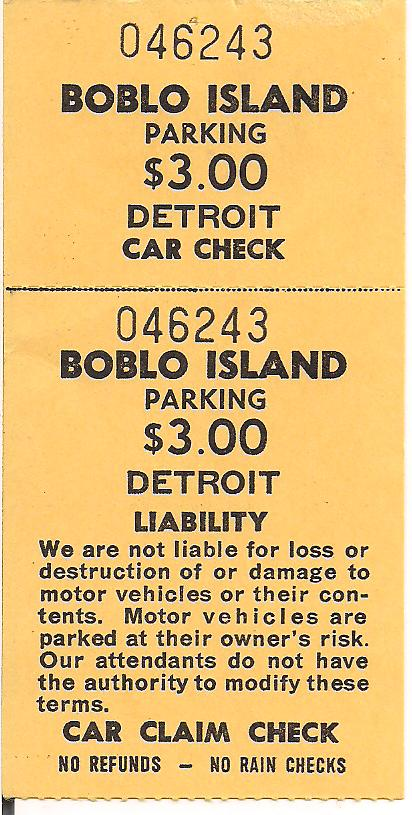
A parking stub from Boblo Island, 1988

For more than 85 years, the park was serviced by SS Ste. Clair and SS Columbia. A 1910 advertisement in the Detroit Free Press offered a trip to Boblo Island.

The Boblo Island Amusement Park was famous for those two steamers, which went between Detroit and the island. A lawsuit concerning the power of the state of Michigan to prohibit racial discrimination on the ferries, Bob-Lo Excursion Co. v. Michigan, 333 U.S. 28 (1948), reached the U.S. Supreme Court and resulted in a notable decision construing the Commerce Clause.

During the Vietnam War, when Canada had become a safe haven for those who refused to be drafted into the U.S. Army, Boblo Island became an efficient transit point for Americans who sought refuge from prosecution. Those seeking to pass into Canada would take the boat from Detroit to Boblo and, upon arrival, would trade their return tickets with persons who had arrived on the island from Amherstburg. Those who had come from Canada took the return trip to Detroit, and those who had come from Detroit took the return trip to Amherstburg, thus arriving in Canada without having to pass through customs at the border.

== Today ==
The island is currently being developed as Boblo Island and Marina Resort Community by Amico Properties Limited. Boblo Island now has a community of homes and condominiums. The island is served by a private ferry.

Temporary alterations of both of the steamers, Columbia and Ste. Clair, was made for the 2014 feature film Transformers: Age of Extinction.

The Ste. Claire was engulfed in an accidental fire while docked on the Detroit River on July 6, 2018. The fire could not be contained and destroyed the historic mahogany woodwork and upper decks. "Yeah, she's 110 years old, but she's well-built and she survived," said boat co-owner, Ron Kattoo. "We are at the point in restoration to where it was a steel skeleton structure ready to be rebuilt." As of 2019, the vessel is docked at Riverside Marina in Detroit.

== See also ==
- Jesuit missions in North America
