= Bois Blanc Island Lighthouse and Blockhouse =

Historic site in Ontario, Canada

Bois Blanc Island Lighthouse
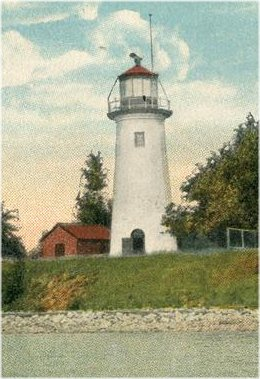
- Circa 1919
- Location: Amherstburg, Canada
- Coordinates: 42°05′13″N 83°7′10″W

Tower
- Constructed: 1836
- Construction: Limestone and rubble tower
- Height: 40 feet (12 m)
- Shape: tapered cylindrical tower
- Heritage: heritage lighthouse, recognized federal heritage building of Canada

Light
- Deactivated: 1950s

National Historic Site of Canada
- Official name: Bois Blanc Island Lighthouse and Blockhouse National Historic Site of Canada
- Designated: 10 May 1955

Bois Blanc Blockhouse
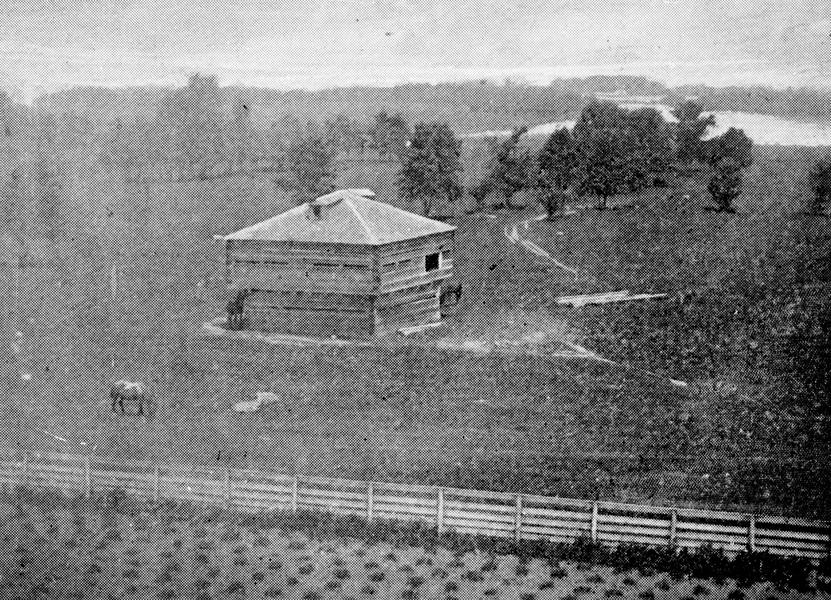
- One of three blockhouses in 1893
- Interactive map of the Bois Blanc Blockhouse area

General information
- Type: Blockhouse
- Location: Bois Blanc Island, Amherstburg, Canada
- Renovated: 2012–2014
- Owner: Dominic Amicone

Technical details
- Floor count: 2

The Bois Blanc Island Lighthouse and Blockhouse is a National Historic Site of Canada located in Ontario on Bois Blanc Island, (Note: Commonly called Boblo Island. "Boblo" is an English corruption of the French "Bois Blanc" (white wood), stemming from the island's birch trees) one of the islands in the Detroit River. It consists of a lighthouse, owned by Parks Canada, and a blockhouse, which is privately owned.

== Lighthouse ==
The lighthouse is a white stone tower, located at the south end of Bois Blanc Island near the mouth of the Detroit River where it opens into Lake Erie. It was built by the government of Upper Canada in 1836, in the style of an imperial tower common from the 1830s to the 1860s. Its purpose was to improve naval safety in Lake Erie, on which greater navigation was occurring because of the 1829 completion of the Welland Canal. The Legislative Assembly of Upper Canada appointed a group of commissioners, to whom a design with specifications were submitted. Although it is not known who designed the lighthouse, a local legend holds that it was Amherstburg engineer Andrew Kemp, a member of the civil branch of the Royal Engineers. The construction contract was awarded to John Cook of Detroit.

The limestone tower was built consistent with imperial tower designs of its era as a tapered circular tower with a rubble-stone core and rubble-stone finish. The diameter at its base is 18 feet (5.5 m), and it reaches a height of 40 feet (12 m). The cornice consists of stepped corbelling, and three windows are installed at varying heights of the building. The limestone used in the tower's construction may have come from Kingston aboard a ship, on which it was used as ballast.

== Blockhouse ==
The blockhouse was the last of three built on the island, erected in 1838 as part of a defensive system for Fort Malden. It is located near the lighthouse, on the south side of Bois Blanc Island. The original structure was built of square-cut logs from white oak, with gun slits on each wall. The upper floor housed the sleeping quarters, and had machicolations in the floor. Storage shelters were built underground, one for gun powder and the other for food.

In Blockhouses in Canada, 1749–1841: A Comparative Report and Catalogue, Richard J. Young states that the blockhouse and battery on Bois Blanc Island is "ridiculous in the extreme" since it would not prevent or mitigate enemy incursions.

On display in the building are artefacts recovered during excavations in and near the building.

=== Renovation ===
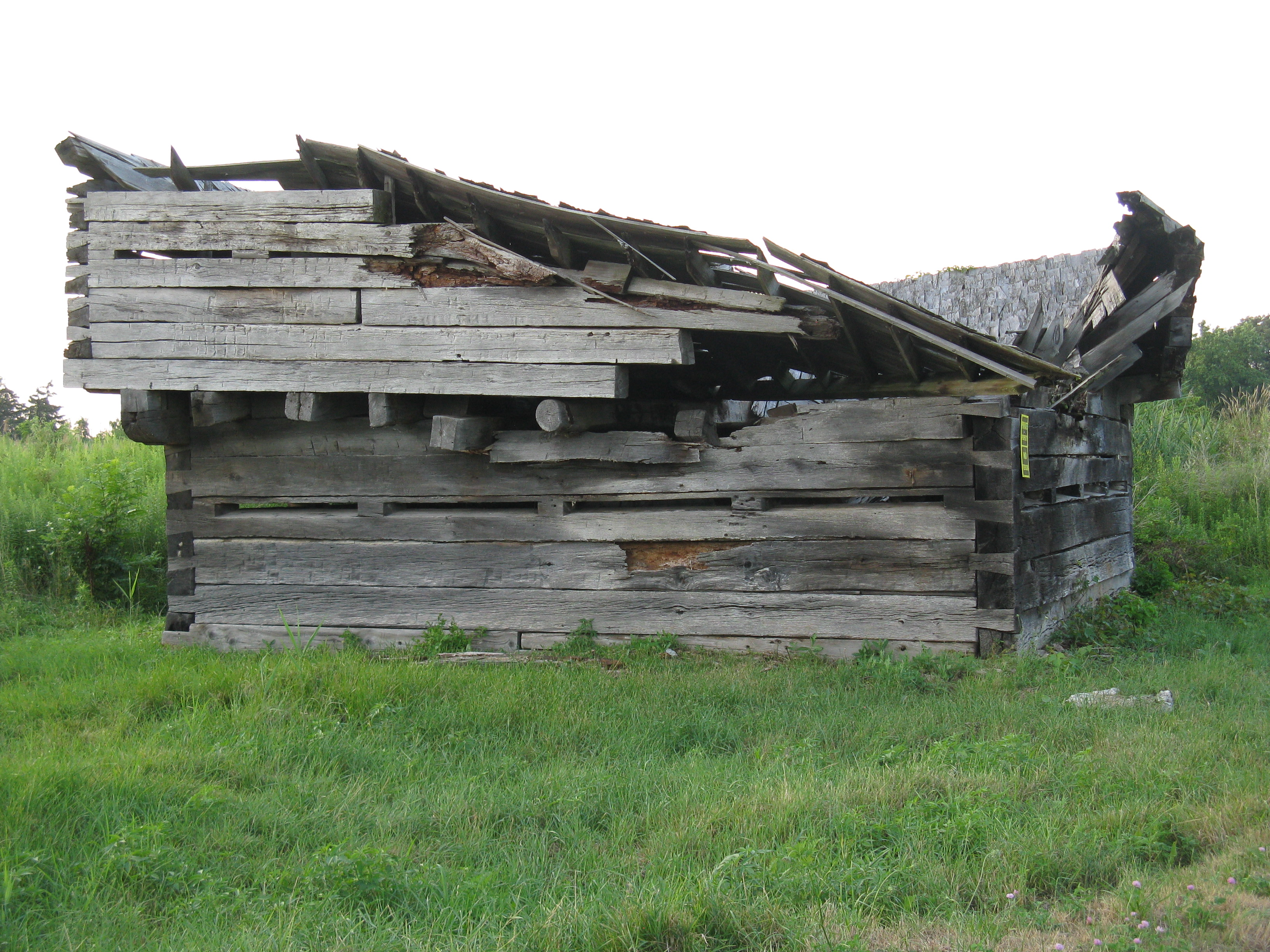
The blockhouse in 2010, before restoration work was started.

By 2010, the derelict building was missing the upper floor and staircase, the walls were on the verge of collapsing, and the roof was caving in. The private owner of the building has stated he intends to turn it over to Parks Canada once a restoration is complete. With his permission, several volunteers began restoring the building.

The structure was raised about 18 inches (46 cm) with the construction of a concrete foundation. A log floor was built under the structure, and was covered with rough-cut pine floors. A thick door with iron fittings was installed.

In 2013, residents of the island raised $5,000 that, along with other private donations, paid for the cost to install a cedar shake roof.

== Twentieth and twenty-first century ==
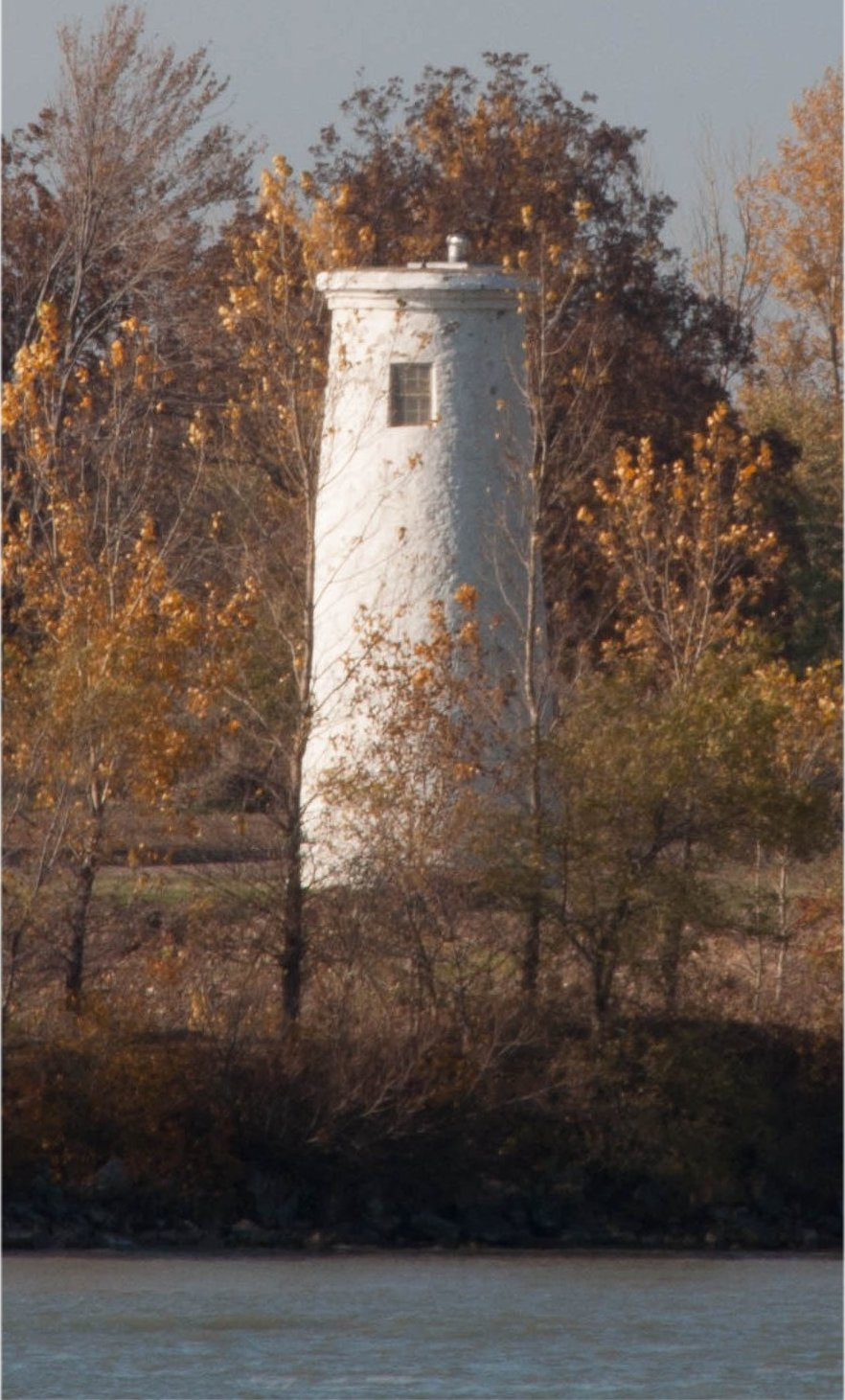
Circa 2009

The original lantern was a catoptric device, and was upgraded a number of times until the 1950s. It was destroyed by fire in 1954, and the lantern room was replaced by a steel frame. The lighthouse was decommissioned in the late 1950s, and in 1961, it became property of Parks Canada, which removed the steel frame in the 1970s, and also restored the door and fan light. These were destroyed by vandals, so the entrance was blocked with stone rubble.

For almost 90 years, the head Lighthouse keeper was a member of the Hackett family: James (1836–1870), Andrew (1870–1901), Agnes (1901–1910), and Charles R. Hackett (1910–1924). (Note: "Lieutenant-Governor Francis Bond Head officially appointed Hackett keeper shortly after he began taking care of the light, and two stories persist about how this appointment came about. In one, Mary Hackett, with twin babes in arms, visited the Lieutenant-Governor and successfully petitioned for the position. According to another legend, Mary Hackett passed the Lieutenant-Governor with the family's Newfoundland dog Sailor, and so taken was Bond Head with the dog that he asked to buy it. Mary refused to sell the family pet but said she would trade it in exchange for the position of lighthouse keeper for her husband. These stories may not be true, but the Hacketts did name a son, born at the lighthouse in 1842, Francis Bond Head Hackett in honor of the Lieutenant-Governor.") In 2015, it was among 74 lighthouses to be protected under the Heritage Lighthouse Protection Act, and among 42 lighthouses owned by Parks Canada.

=== National Historic Site of Canada ===
In 1955, Bois Blanc Island Lighthouse and Blockhouse was designated a National Historic Site of Canada. The factors that led to its designation include its proximity to the National Historic Site of Fort Malden, for which the blockhouses formed part of its defence, and for being site of a failed attack by "Canadian rebels and their American sympathizers" in January 1838. Although the tower is closed, the site is open.

== See also ==
- Imperial Towers
- List of lighthouses in Canada
