= Detroit Harbor Terminal Building =

Warehouse in Michigan, United States

Detroit Harbor Terminals Inc. Building
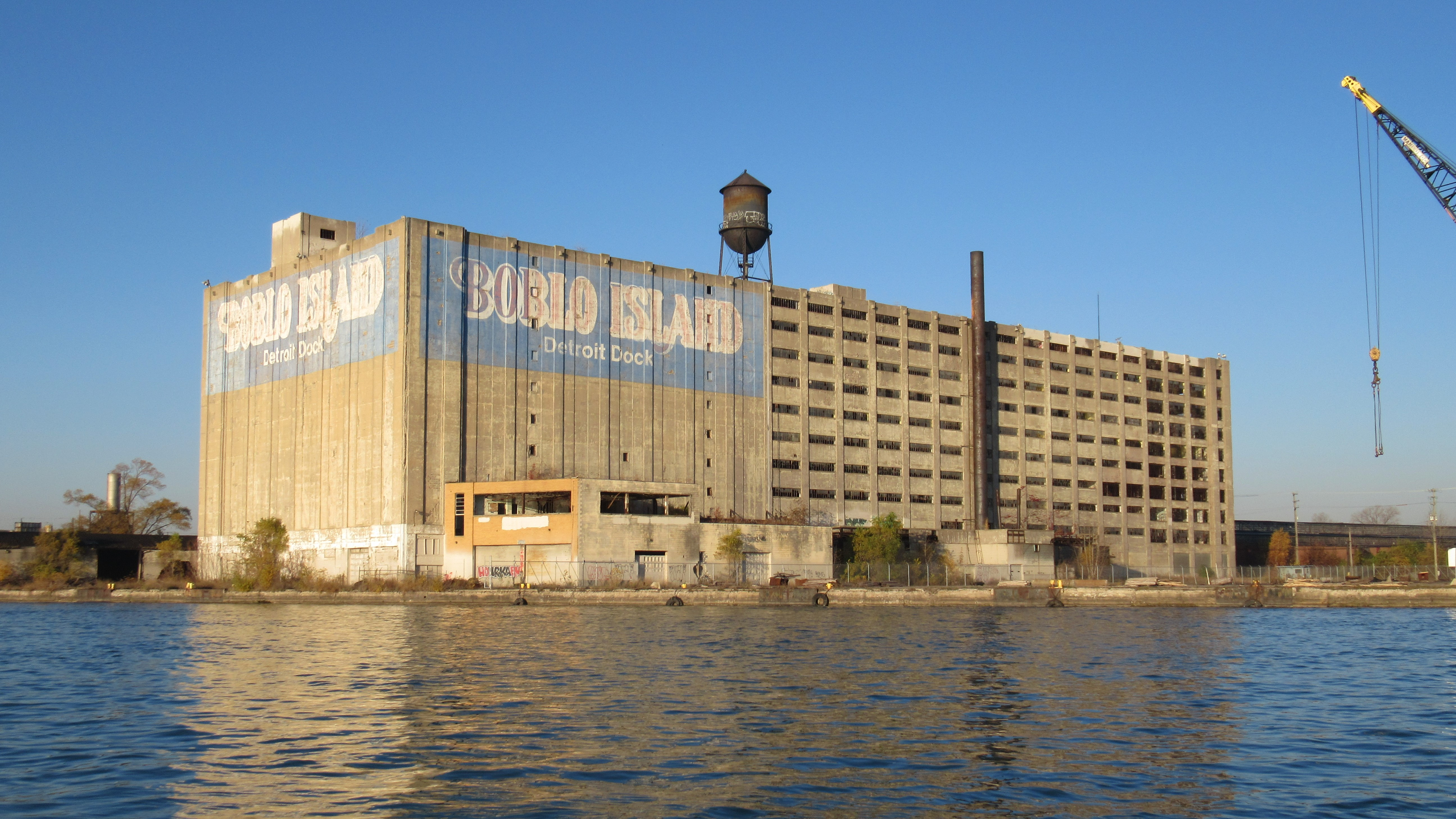
- Boblo Building as seen from the Detroit River
- Interactive map of the Detroit Harbor Terminals Inc. Building area
- Alternative names: Boblo Island Detroit Dock Building, Detroit Marine Terminal Building

General information
- Status: Demolished
- Location: Detroit, US
- Coordinates: 42°18′23.47″N 83°05′12.2″W
- Completed: March 15, 1926
- Destroyed: 2023
- Demolished: 2023
- Owner: Moroun Company

Technical details
- Floor count: 10
- Floor area: 900,000 sq ft (83,613 m^{2})

Design and construction
- Architecture firm: Albert Kahn Inc.

The Detroit Harbor Terminal Building, also known as the Detroit Marine Terminal Building, was a ten-story warehouse in Detroit, Michigan. The warehouse was located on the Detroit River just downriver from the Ambassador Bridge between S. McKinstry and Clark Streets on West Jefferson Avenue.

On 1 May 1925, the Detroit Railway and Harbor Terminals Company issued $3.75 million in bonds towards the construction of a 12-acre terminal warehouse and related facilities. The large warehouse that would be built was intended to relieve shortage of storage space for the growing city. Construction of a ten-story, 900,000 square feet building, of reinforced concrete, was the largest on the Great Lakes when it opened on 15 March 1926. The new building was designed by Albert Kahn and his firm.

== Current status ==
The former warehouse was acquired by Boblo Island Amusement Co., and used up until 2003 when the site was foreclosed; the Boblo Island Amusement Park had already been long abandoned since 1993. This structure quickly became a hot-spot for explorers, photographers, and vandals; due to the building's immense size, there was plenty of space to partake in these activities.

In 2016, a fire was sparked in the fourth-floor offices of the building, and the blaze was fought throughout the night.

By 2021, the former warehouse was purchased by the Moroun Company, which had plans to demolish the vacant building. In 2022, work on the building began but unexpectedly halted. It was suspected that the Detroit-Wayne County Port Authority may have been the reason why the Moroun Company hadn't proceeded with the demolition, as the authority stated its objection to the plan. In late March 2023, demolition resumed, with demolition crews demolishing the Jefferson facade and a large portion of the main warehouse. In September of 2023, demolition of the building finished, and debris was being removed from the site in November of 2023. As of August 2024, all debris is gone and new buildings take up the site.

== Gallery ==
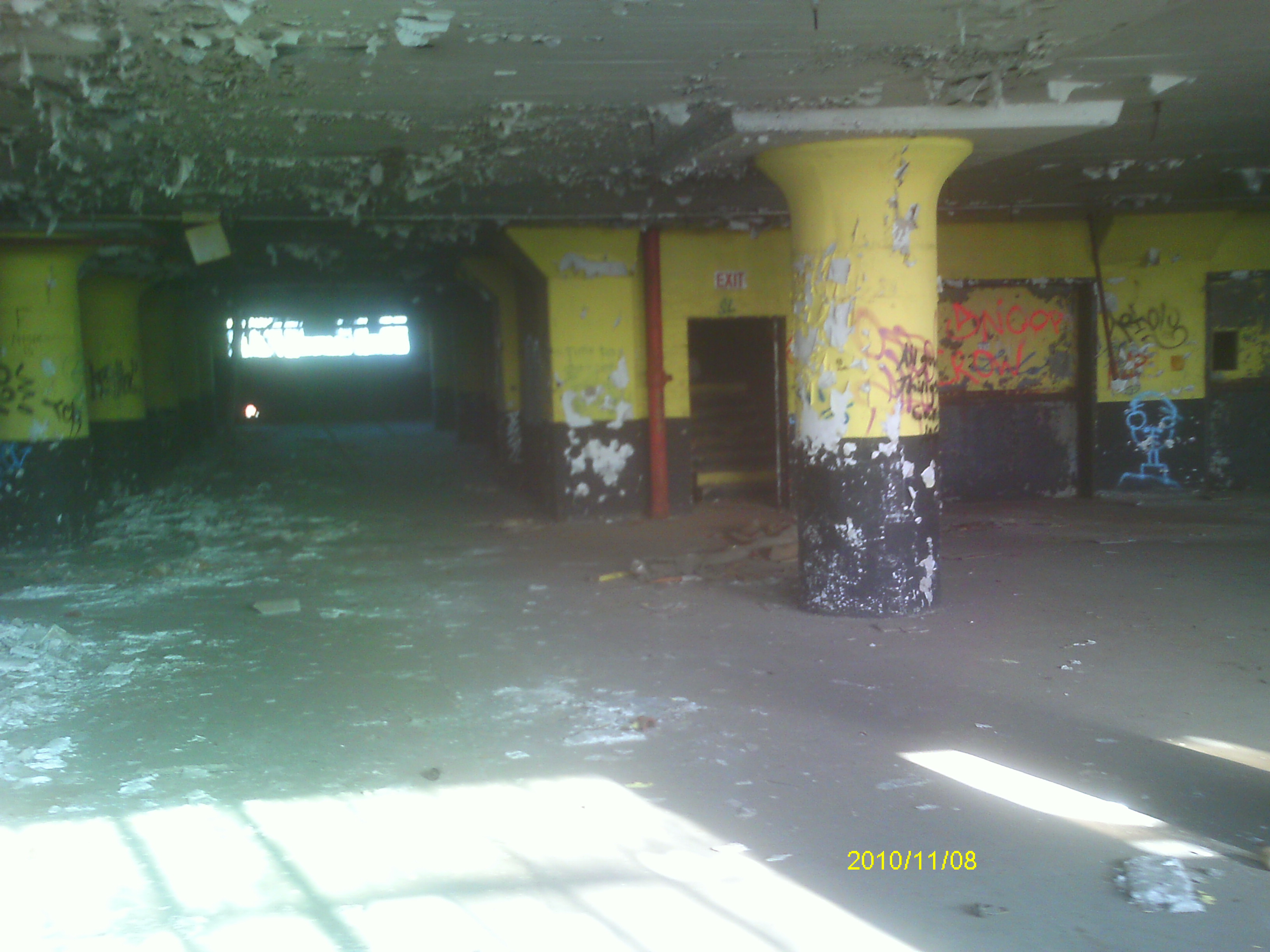
Inside the vacant building which has been stripped of much of its metal by thieves and vandalized.

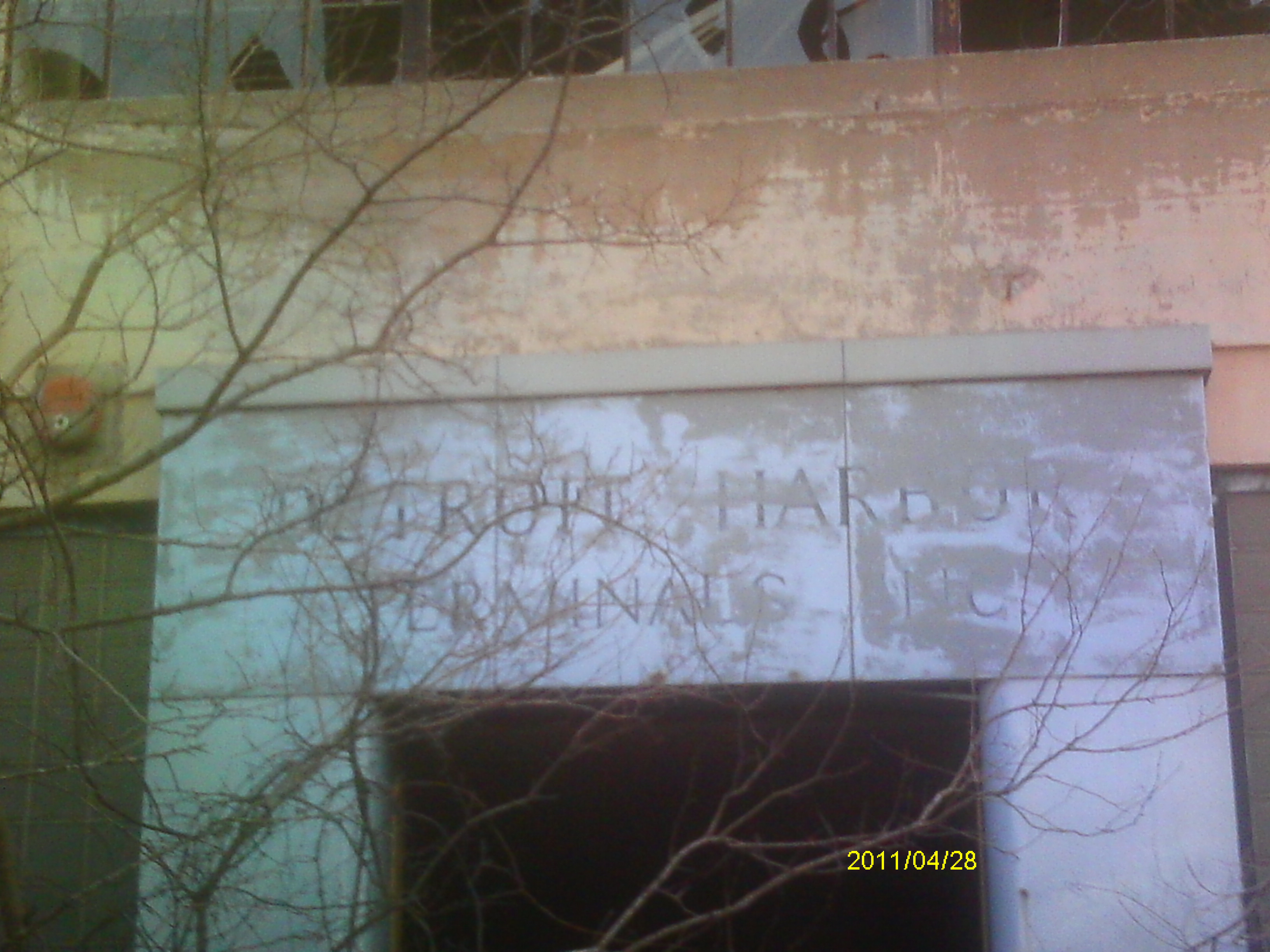
The main entrance on Jefferson Ave. W.

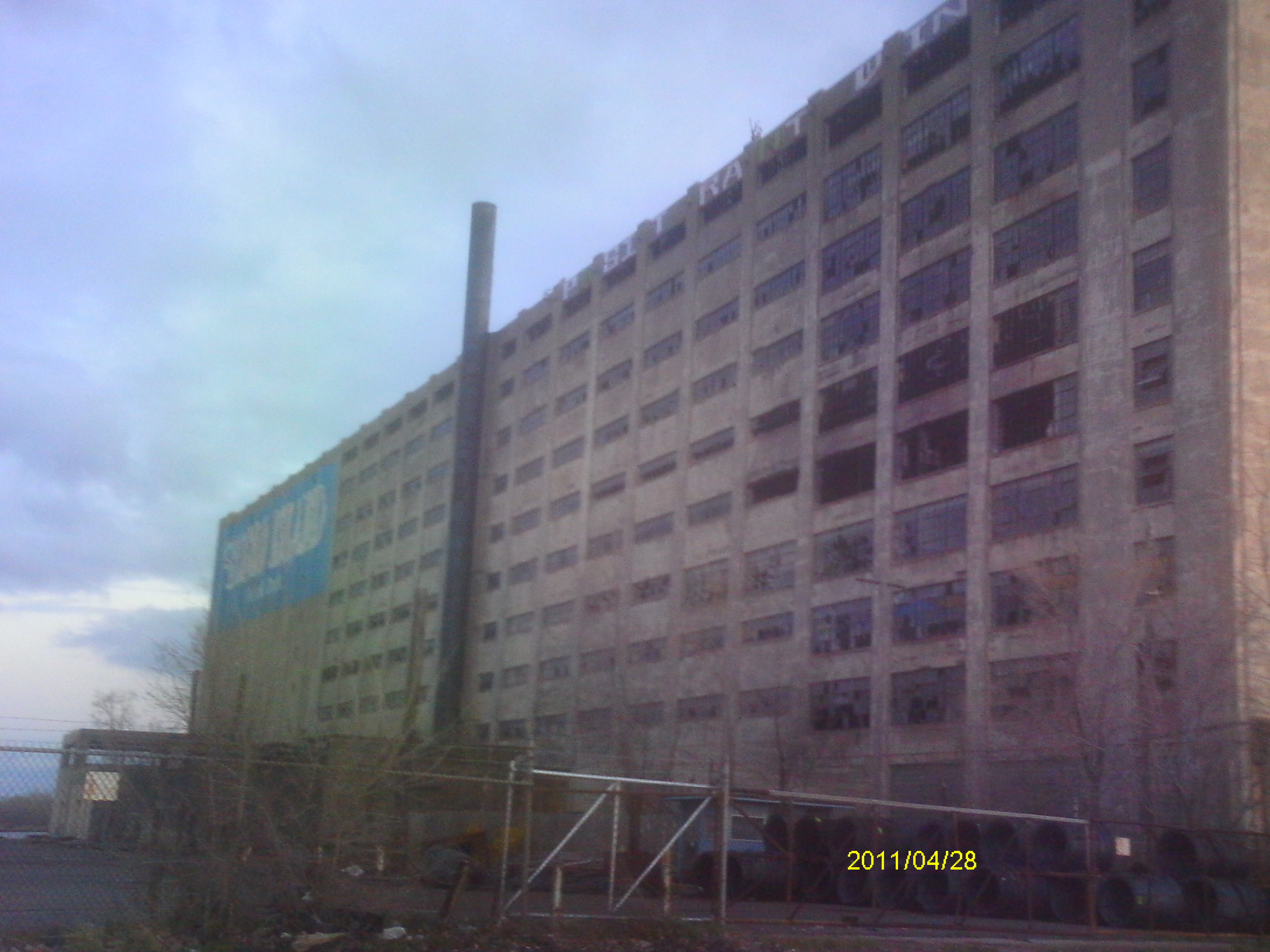
View of the east-northeast (upriver) side of the building from Clark St. and Jefferson Ave. W. The graffiti was new as of April 2011.

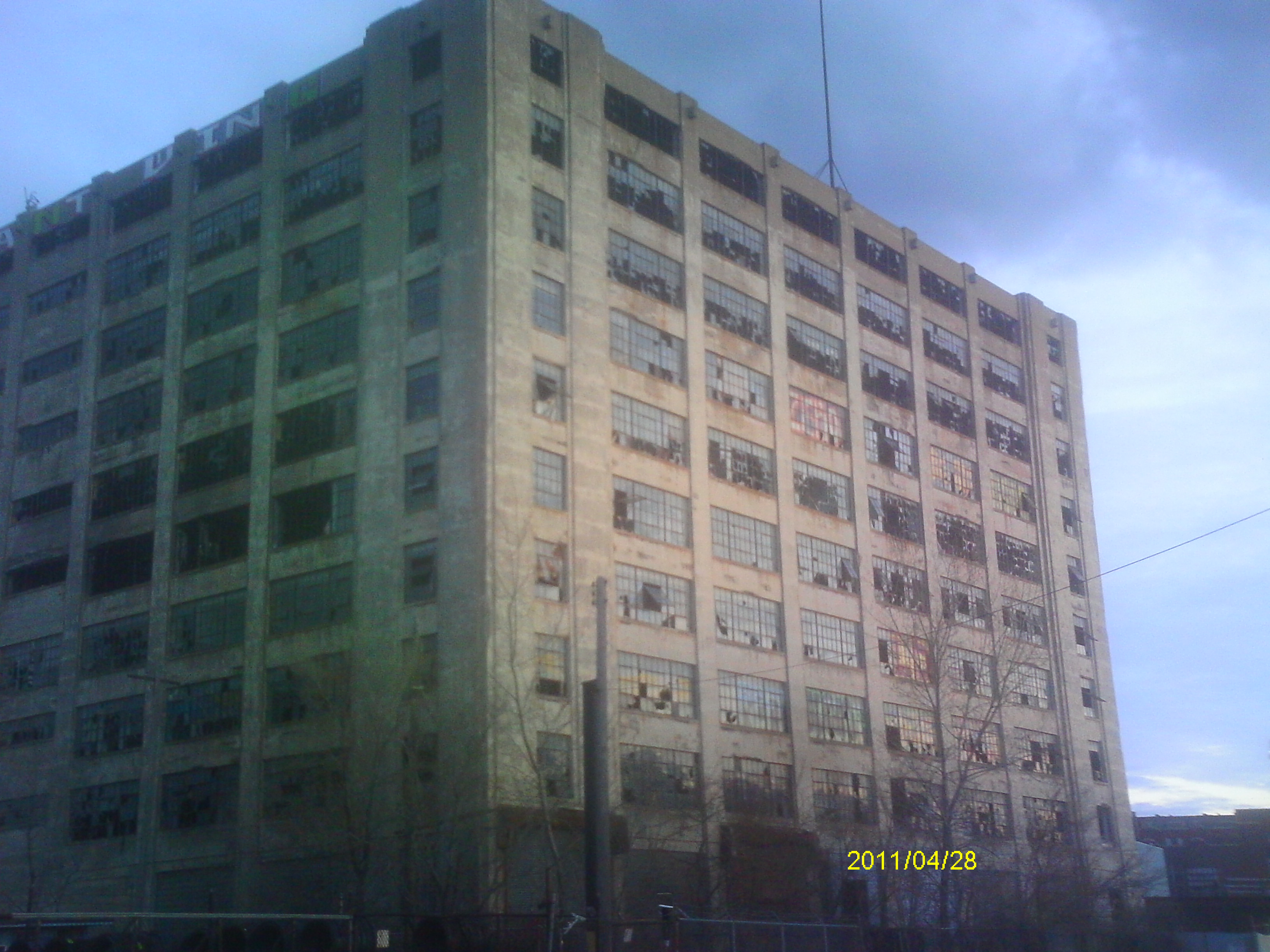
View of the north side of the building from Clark St. and Jefferson Ave. W. The graffiti was new as of April 2011.

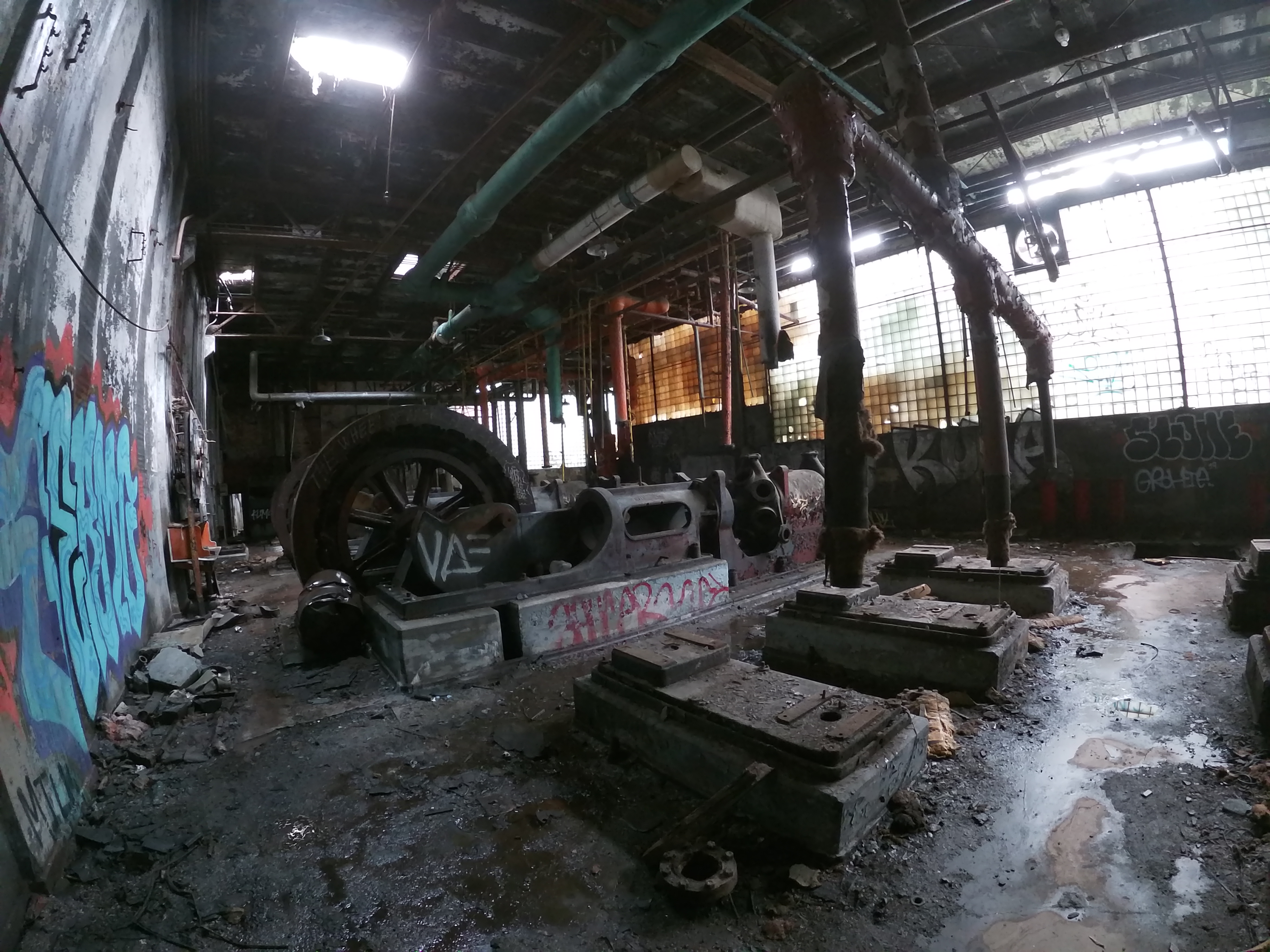
Pump-house and boiler-room, that provided refrigerant and heat to the warehouse building, 2021

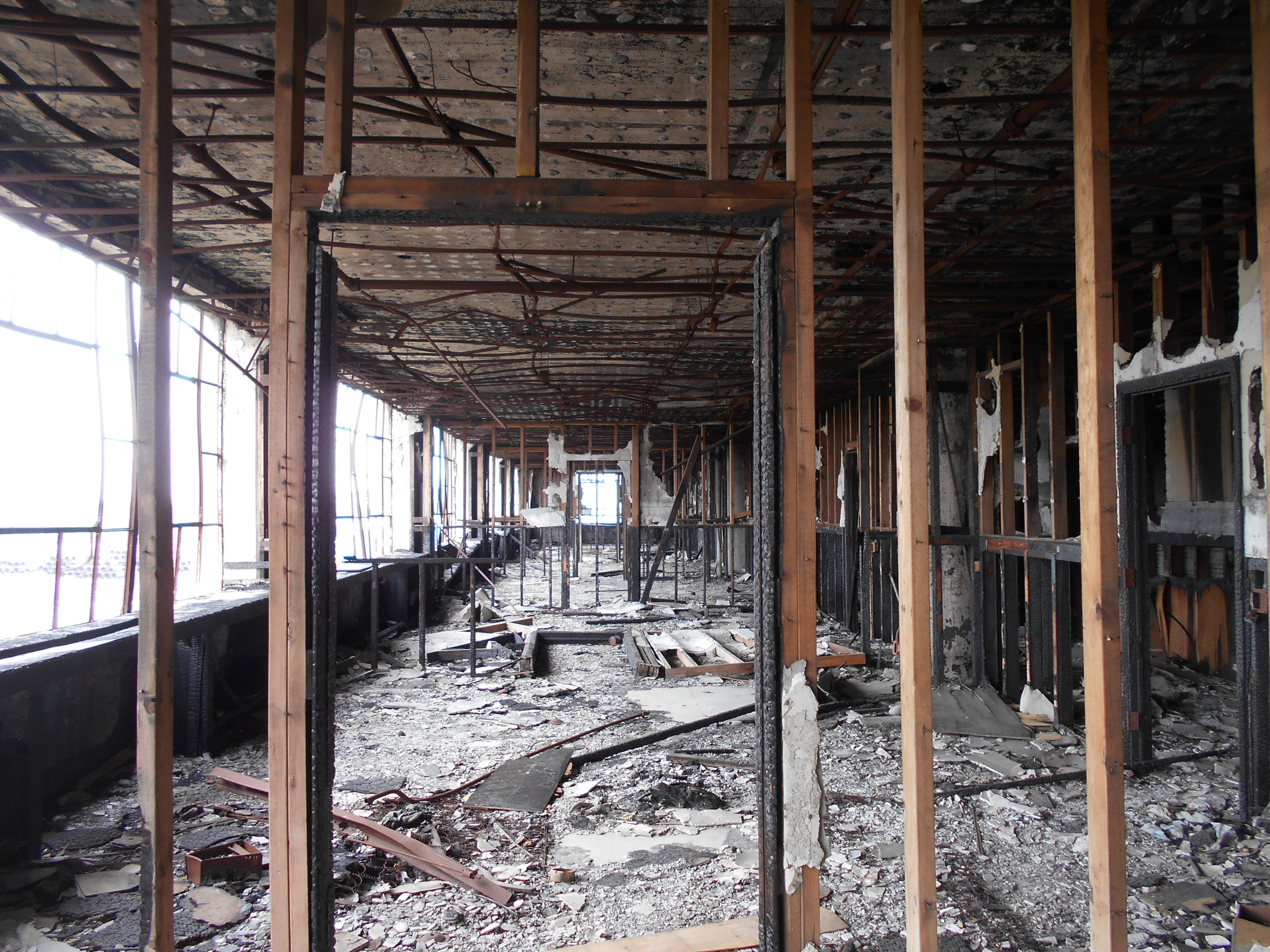
What remains of the fourth-floor office space, 2021

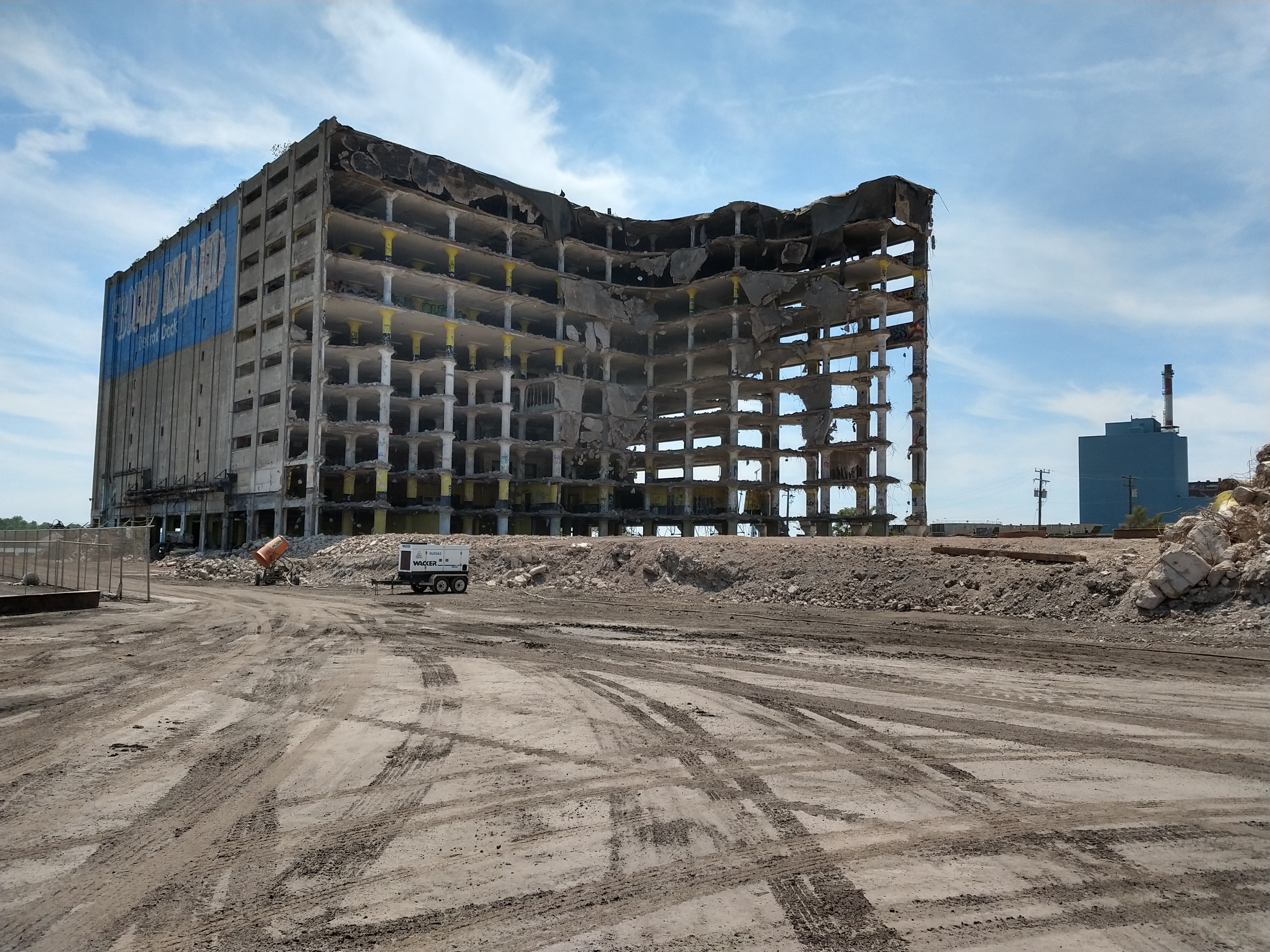
Detroit Harbor Terminal undergoes demolition, 2023

== See also ==
- Boblo Island Amusement Park (1898-1993) on Bois Blanc Island (Ontario), formerly a destination of ferry service from this terminal.
